= 2007 Iowa Hawkeyes football team =

American college football season

2007 Iowa Hawkeyes football
- Conference: Big Ten Conference
- Record: 6–6 (4–4 Big Ten)
- Head coach: Kirk Ferentz (9th season)
- Offensive coordinator: Ken O'Keefe (9th season)
- Offensive scheme: Pro-style
- Defensive coordinator: Norm Parker (9th season)
- Base defense: 4–3
- MVPs: Mike Humpal; Albert Young
- Captain: 5: Tom Busch; Mike Humpal; Bryan Mattison; Daniel Olszta; Albert Young
- Home stadium: Kinnick Stadium (Capacity: 70,585)

Uniform

2007 Big Ten Conference football standings
	Conf.			Overall
Team	W		L	W		L
No. 5 Ohio State $	7	–	1	11	–	2
No. 18 Michigan	6	–	2	9	–	4
No. 20 Illinois %	6	–	2	9	–	4
No. 24 Wisconsin	5	–	3	9	–	4
Penn State	4	–	4	9	–	4
Iowa	4	–	4	6	–	6
Purdue	3	–	5	8	–	5
Indiana	3	–	5	7	–	6
Michigan State	3	–	5	7	–	6
Northwestern	3	–	5	6	–	6
Minnesota	0	–	8	1	–	11
$ – BCS representative as conference champion; % – BCS at-large representative; Rankings from AP Poll

The 2007 Iowa Hawkeyes football team represented the University of Iowa during the 2007 NCAA Division I FBS football season. Heading into the season, several players left the team while several other players ran into criminal allegations. Following a disappointing 2006 season that included losses to Indiana, Northwestern and Minnesota, the team was coached by Kirk Ferentz and played their six home games at Kinnick Stadium in Iowa City, Iowa.

== Previous season ==
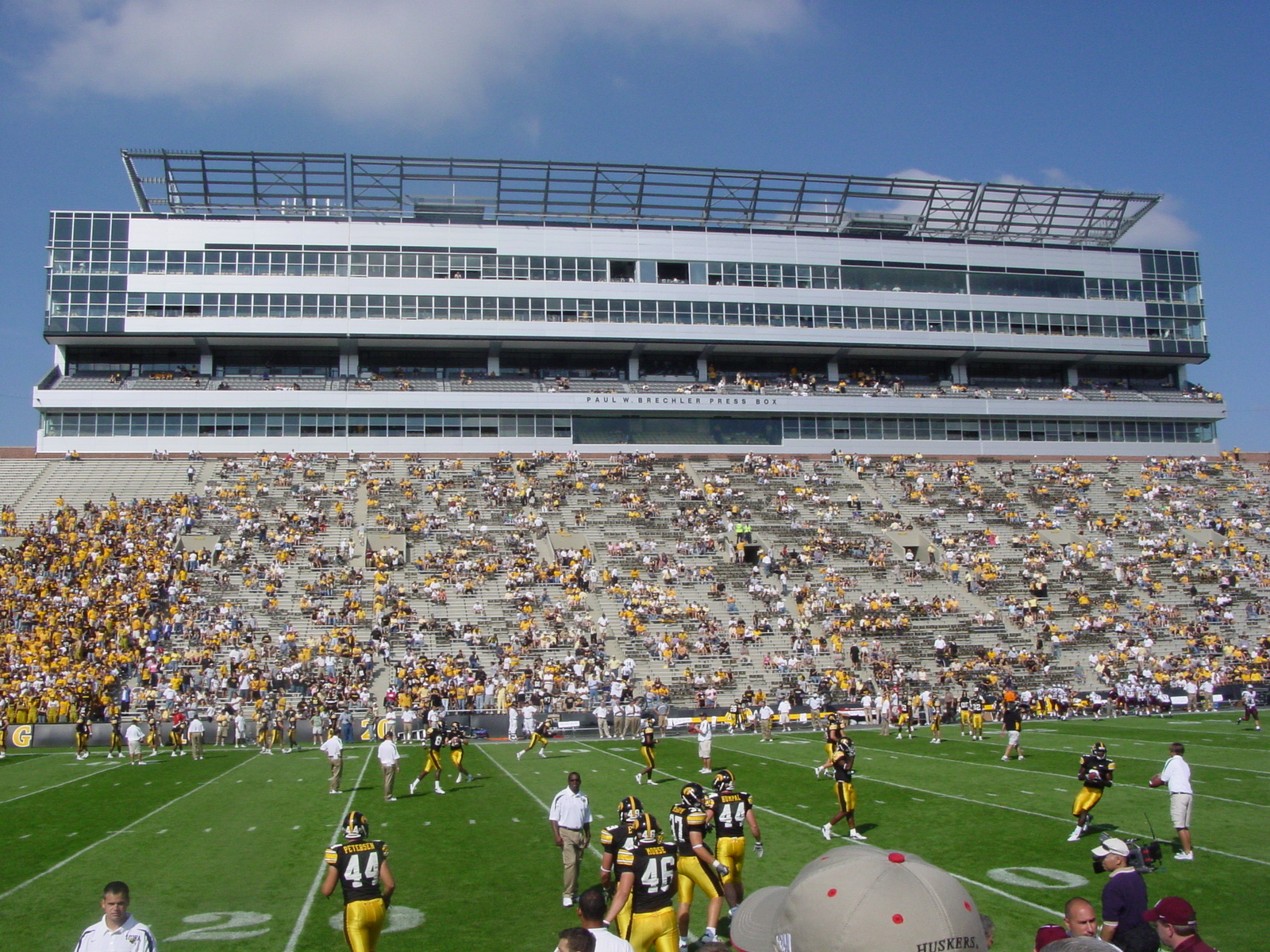
Players prepare to play Montana on September 2, 2006.

Entering 2006 ranked 16th in the AP Poll and 17th in the Coaches Poll, the Hawkeyes had high hopes for the season. Following victories over Montana, Syracuse, Iowa State and Illinois, the Hawkeyes were 4–0 heading into their game with top-ranked Ohio State. With tickets for the game going for US$500 on eBay, the game was hyped as one of the biggest in Kinnick Stadium history. But quarterback Drew Tate threw 3 interceptions, and the Hawkeyes lost 38–17. In total, Iowa had 4 turnovers while Ohio State had zero.

Following the loss to Ohio State, Iowa proceeded to score a season-high 47 points in a victory over Purdue. But the most notable score came during the 4th quarter, when Adam Shada intercepted a Curtis Painter pass and returned it a school record 98-yards for the touchdown. However, Iowa's joy would not last long, as the Hawkeyes were upset by Indiana only a week later. The 31–28 win was Indiana's biggest win since a victory over 9th-ranked Ohio State in 1987.

From there, the season unraveled, and the Hawkeyes lost four of their remaining five games en route to a 6–6 record. The Hawkeyes were not invited to a bowl game following the conclusion of the 2007 season.

== Before the season ==
On April 20, 2007, it was announced by Ferentz that two players, Ryan Bain and Justin Edwards, were leaving the team. Both are planning on transferring to other schools. Bain, who had 56 career tackles, was later found guilty on charges of disorderly conduct. About two months later, it was announced that Shonn Greene and Amari Spievey were no longer on the team. Greene, a junior running back, had 378 rushing yards and two touchdowns in his career. Another month later, and it was announced that Lucas Cox and Marcus Wilson were leaving the team. Wilson, a sophomore defensive back, played in all 13 games in 2006 and recorded 21 tackles and one interception. Earlier in July, senior defensive back Devan Moylan was given an additional year of eligibility. After suffering a leg injury in the fourth game of 2006 against Illinois, he applied for a medical hardship. Prior to the 2007 season, he had 28 tackles and one interception in his career.

=== Criminal charges ===
On August 20, 2007, two Hawkeye wide receivers were arrested and charged with the unauthorized use of a credit card. Dominique Douglas and Anthony Bowman, both sophomores, were suspended indefinitely by Ferentz following allegations that they bought more than $2,000 in merchandise with stolen credit cards. The crime is a felony, and if convicted, the two players can face up to five years in prison along with a $7,500 fine. Another player, Arvell Nelson, also experienced trouble with the law. Nelson posted a $545 bond for failure to appear in court after being charged with driving with a suspended license. He also paid a $390 fine for not having insurance. 1 in every 10 Iowa football players during the 2007 season had off-field arrests, the highest among any year in Kirk Ferentz's tenure at Iowa.

=== Recruiting class ===
The Hawkeyes received 22 letters of intent on National Signing Day, February 7, 2007.

College recruiting (2007)
Name	Hometown	School	Height	Weight	40^{‡}	Commit date
Christian Ballard; DE	Lawrence, KS	Lawrence Free State HS	6 ft 4 in (1.93 m)	277 lb (126 kg)	4.75	Sep 26, 2006
Christian Ballard; DE	Recruit ratings: Scout: Rivals: (79)					
Jordan Bernstine; S	Des Moines, IA	Lincoln HS	5 ft 11 in (1.80 m)	200 lb (91 kg)	4.42	Dec 23, 2006
Jordan Bernstine; S	Recruit ratings: Scout: Rivals: (78)					
Broderick Binns; LB	St. Paul, MN	Cretin Durham Hall	6 ft 2 in (1.88 m)	235 lb (107 kg)	4.70	Nov 6, 2006
Broderick Binns; LB	Recruit ratings: Scout: Rivals: (78)					
Bryan Bulaga; OG	Woodstock, IL	Marian Central Catholic HS	6 ft 6 in (1.98 m)	273 lb (124 kg)	4.79	May 20, 2006
Bryan Bulaga; OG	Recruit ratings: Scout: Rivals: (80)					
Jacody Coleman; LB	Beaumont, TX	West Brook Senior HS	6 ft 2 in (1.88 m)	232 lb (105 kg)	4.63	Dec 17, 2006
Jacody Coleman; LB	Recruit ratings: Scout: Rivals: (73)					
Lebron Daniel; LB	Cleveland, OH	Glenville HS	6 ft 2 in (1.88 m)	223 lb (101 kg)	4.84	Dec 30, 2006
Lebron Daniel; LB	Recruit ratings: Scout: Rivals: (40)					
Mike Daniels; DE	Blackwood, NJ	Highland HS	6 ft 1 in (1.85 m)	230 lb (100 kg)	4.60	Jan 29, 2007
Mike Daniels; DE	Recruit ratings: Scout: Rivals: (40)					
Bruce Davis; LB	Cleveland, OH	Glenville HS	5 ft 11 in (1.80 m)	230 lb (100 kg)	4.70	Jan 30, 2007
Bruce Davis; LB	Recruit ratings: Scout: Rivals: (65)					
Cedric Everson; CB	Detroit, MI	Mumford HS	6 ft 1 in (1.85 m)	178 lb (81 kg)	4.35	Feb 7, 2007
Cedric Everson; CB	Recruit ratings: Scout: Rivals: (79)					
Zach Furlong; TE	Xenia, OH	Xenia HS	6 ft 5 in (1.96 m)	214 lb (97 kg)	4.72	Dec 11, 2006
Zach Furlong; TE	Recruit ratings: Scout: Rivals: (73)					
Adam Gettis; DE	Frankfort, IL	Lincoln-Way East HS	6 ft 3 in (1.91 m)	233 lb (106 kg)	4.90	Nov 27, 2006
Adam Gettis; DE	Recruit ratings: Scout: Rivals: (71)					
Cody Hundertmark; DT	Humboldt, IA	Humboldt HS	6 ft 4 in (1.93 m)	266 lb (121 kg)	4.78	May 6, 2007
Cody Hundertmark; DT	Recruit ratings: Scout: Rivals: (71)					
Marvin McNutt; QB	Florissant, MO	Hazelwood Central HS	6 ft 3 in (1.91 m)	183 lb (83 kg)	4.60	Jul 9, 2006
Marvin McNutt; QB	Recruit ratings: Scout: Rivals: (77)					
Diaunate Morrow; S	Lakewood, OH	St. Edward HS	6 ft 0 in (1.83 m)	182 lb (83 kg)	4.65	Dec 13, 2006
Diaunate Morrow; S	Recruit ratings: Scout: Rivals: (65)					
Dezman Moses; LB	Willingboro, NJ	Willingboro HS	6 ft 2 in (1.88 m)	214 lb (97 kg)	4.60	Nov 22, 2006
Dezman Moses; LB	Recruit ratings: Scout: Rivals: (40)					
Tyler Nielsen; LB	Humboldt, IA	Humboldt HS	6 ft 4 in (1.93 m)	213 lb (97 kg)	4.50	May 10, 2006
Tyler Nielsen; LB	Recruit ratings: Scout: Rivals: (78)					
Jevon Pugh; RB	Naples, FL	Naples HS	5 ft 10 in (1.78 m)	210 lb (95 kg)	4.60	Jan 30, 2007
Jevon Pugh; RB	Recruit ratings: Scout: Rivals: (68)					
Allen Reisner; TE	Marion, IA	Marion HS	6 ft 3 in (1.91 m)	215 lb (98 kg)	4.70	Feb 3, 2007
Allen Reisner; TE	Recruit ratings: Scout: Rivals: (40)					
Colin Sandeman; WR	Bettendorf, IA	Bettendort HS	6 ft 1 in (1.85 m)	188 lb (85 kg)	4.52	May 6, 2006
Colin Sandeman; WR	Recruit ratings: Scout: Rivals: (76)					
Tyler Sash; S	Oskaloosa, IA	Oskaloosa HS	6 ft 1 in (1.85 m)	191 lb (87 kg)	4.56	Aug 3, 2006
Tyler Sash; S	Recruit ratings: Scout: Rivals: (69)					
Abe Satterfield; CB	Erie, PA	Cathedral Preparatory School	6 ft 1 in (1.85 m)	283 lb (128 kg)	4.40	Aug 14, 2006
Abe Satterfield; CB	Recruit ratings: Scout: Rivals: (67)					
Markus Zusevics; OT	Arlington Heights, IL	Prospect HS	6 ft 5 in (1.96 m)	258 lb (117 kg)	4.80	Jan 4, 2007
Markus Zusevics; OT	Recruit ratings: Scout: Rivals: (78)					
Overall recruit ranking: Scout: 37 Rivals: 22
‡ Refers to 40-yard dash; Note: In many cases, Scout, Rivals, 247Sports, On3, and ESPN may conflict in their listings of height, weight and 40 time.; In these cases, the average was taken. ESPN grades are on a 100-point scale.; Sources: "Iowa Commit List for 2007". Rivals.; "Scout.com: Football Recruiting". Scout.; "Recruit Tracker 2007". ESPN.; "Scout.com Team Recruiting Rankings". Scout.; "2007 Team Ranking". Rivals.com.

=== Awards ===
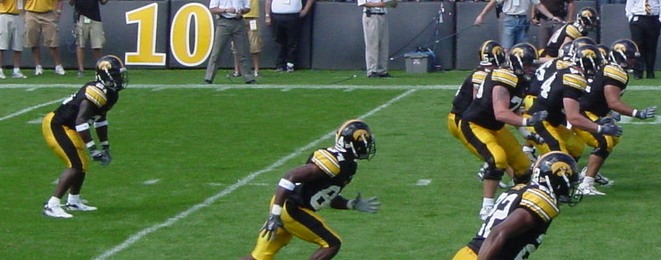
Albert Young lines up for a play against Montana in 2006.

- Kenny Iwebema
  First-team all-Big Ten – Rivals.com
  First-team all-Big Ten – CFN.com
- Mitch King
  First-team all-Big Ten – Rivals.com
  Second-team all-Big Ten – Athlon Sports
- Bryan Mattison
  First-team all-Big Ten – Athlon Sports
  Second-team all-Big Ten – Rivals.com
  Second-team all-Big Ten – CFN.com
- Mike Klinkenborg
  Lott Trophy watch list
  Bednarik Award watch list
  Second-team all-Big Ten – Rivals.com
  Second-team all-Big Ten – CFN.com
  Second-team all-Big Ten – Athlon Sports
- Tony Moeaki
  Mackey Award watch list
- Albert Young
  Second-team all-Big Ten – CFN.com
  Second-team all-Big Ten – Athlon Sports
- Dace Richardson
  Second-team all-Big Ten – Rivals.com
  Second-team all-Big Ten – Athlon Sports
- Matt Kroul
  Second-team all-Big Ten – Athlon Sports
- Adam Shada
  Third-team all-Big Ten – Athlon Sports
- Rafael Eubanks
  Rimington Trophy watch list
  Second-team all-Big Ten – Athlon Sports
- Seth Olsen
  Third-team all-Big Ten – Athlon Sports

== Schedule ==
Date	Time	Opponent	Site	TV	Result	Attendance
September 1	2:30 p.m.	vs. Northern Illinois*	Soldier Field; Chicago, IL	ESPNU	W 16–3	61,500
September 8	7:00 p.m.	Syracuse*	Kinnick Stadium; Iowa City, IA	BTN	W 35–0	70,585
September 15	12:30 p.m.	at Iowa State*	Jack Trice Stadium; Ames, IA (Battle for the Cy-Hawk Trophy)	Versus	L 13–15	49,516
September 22	7:00 p.m.	at No. 9 Wisconsin	Camp Randall Stadium; Madison, WI (Battle for the Heartland Trophy)	ABC	L 13–17	82,630
September 29	11:00 a.m.	Indiana^{†}	Kinnick Stadium; Iowa City, IA	BTN	L 20–38	70,585
October 6	2:30 p.m.	at Penn State	Beaver Stadium; State College, PA	ABC	L 7–27	108,951
October 13	11:00 a.m.	No. 18 Illinois	Kinnick Stadium; Iowa City, IA	ESPN2	W 10–6	70,585
October 20	11:00 a.m.	at Purdue	Ross–Ade Stadium; West Lafayette, IN	ESPN2	L 6–31	58,123
October 27	11:00 a.m.	Michigan State	Kinnick Stadium; Iowa City, IA	ESPN2	W 34–27 ^{2OT}	70,585
November 3	11:00 a.m.	at Northwestern	Ryan Field; Evanston, IL	ESPN2	W 28–17	30,173
November 10	11:00 a.m.	Minnesota	Kinnick Stadium; Iowa City, IA (Battle for the Floyd of Rosedale)	BTN	W 21–16	70,585
November 17	2:30 p.m.	Western Michigan*	Kinnick Stadium; Iowa City, IA	BTN	L 19–28	70,585
*Non-conference game; ^{†}Homecoming; Rankings from AP Poll released prior to the game; All times are in Central time

=== Schedule notes ===
Due to the Big Ten's rotating schedule, Iowa did not play either Michigan or Ohio State in 2007. Instead, Iowa played Michigan State and Penn State, two teams that the Hawkeyes had not played since 2004.

Iowa's schedule was ranked as the 9th toughest (or 3rd easiest) in the Big Ten by SI.com.

== Roster ==
2007 Iowa Hawkeyes football roster
Quarterbacks: 6 Christensen, Jake – sophomore; 7 McNutt, Marvin – freshman; 8 Nelson, Arvell – (redshirt) freshman; 11 Farnsworth, Adam – junior; 12 Stanzi, Ricky – (redshirt) freshman; Running backs: 19 O'Meara, Paki – (redshirt) freshman; 21 Young, Albert – senior; 27 Pugh, Jevon – freshman; 28 Sims, Damian – senior; 29 Williams, Eddie – junior; 31 Brown, Dana – sophomore; 33 Mongongo, Brian – (redshirt) freshman; 35 Busch, Tom – senior; 36 Morse, Brett – (redshirt) freshman; 38 McLaughlin, Jordan – junior; Wide receivers: 10 Evans, Ben – (redshirt) freshman; 15 Johnson-Koulianos, Derrell – (redshirt) freshman; 22 Sandeman, Colin – freshman; 26 Chaney Jr, Paul – (redshirt) freshman; 32 Nordmann, Don – (redshirt) freshman; 80 Brodell, Andy – junior; 84 Bowman, Anthony – sophomore; 86 Stross, Trey – sophomore; 88 Douglas, Dominique – sophomore; 89 Cleveland, James – (redshirt) freshman; Tight ends: 30 Spading, Kyle – sophomore; 81 Moeaki, Tony – junior; 82 Reisner, Allen – freshman; 83 Myers, Brandon – junior; 85 Sabers, Michael – junior; 87 Furlong, Zach – freshman; 90 Gerstandt, Tyler – sophomore; Offensive line: 51 Blum, Tyler – sophomore; 52 Eubanks, Rafael – sophomore; 54 Amendola, Richie – sophomore; 55 Aumaitre, Nyere – junior; 56 Zusevics, Markus – freshman; 58 Bruggeman, Rob – junior; 59 Thilges, Ben – freshman; 60 Detweiler, Tyrel – freshman; 60 Calloway, Kyle – sophomore; 61 Meade, Travis – sophomore; 63 Vandervelde, Julian – (redshirt) freshman; 68 Kuempel, Andy – sophomore; 69 Haganman, Kyle – (redshirt) freshman; 70 Postler, Austin – junior; 71 Olsen, Seth – junior; 73 Gettis, Adam – freshman; 74 Doering, Dan – sophomore; 75 Aeschliman, Wesley – junior; 76 Kanellis, Alex – junior; 78 Richardson, Dace – junior; 79 Bulaga, Bryan – freshman	Defensive line: 46 Ballard, Christian – freshman; 47 King, Mitch – junior; 53 Kroul, Matt – junior; 56 Rashad, Dunn – junior; 58 Oberland, Jared – junior; 59 Narinskiy, Anton – junior; 64 Hundertmark, Cody – freshman; 72 Mahmens, Mark – sophomore; 74 Brayton, Nick – freshman; 87 Nardo, Thomas – freshman; 90 McCracken, Grant – junior; 91 Binns, Broderick – freshman; 92 Iwebema, Kenny – senior; 93 Daniels, Mike – freshman; 94 Clayborn, Adrian – (redshirt) freshman; 95 Klug, Karl – (redshirt) freshman; 96 Daniel, Lebron – freshman; 98 Geary, Chad – sophomore; 99 Mattison, Bryan – senior; Linebackers: 33 Tarpinian, Jeff – (redshirt) freshman; 37 McGrath, Gavin – junior; 40 Klinkenborg, Mike – senior; 41 Gattas, Bryon – sophomore; 42 Hunter, Jeremiha – (redshirt) freshman; 43 Angerer, Pat – sophomore; 44 Anderson, Mike – junior; 45 Nielsen, Tyler – freshman; 48 Johnson, Troy – (redshirt) freshman; 49 Edds, A.J. – sophomore; 50 Petersen, Ross – (redshirt) freshman; 51 Moses, Dezman – freshman; 55 Coleman, Jacody – freshman; 57 Morio, Mike – (redshirt) freshman; 57 Davis, Bruce – freshman; Defensive backs: 1 Greiner, Justin – (redshirt) freshman; 2 Dalton, Harold – junior; 3 Morrow, Diauntae – freshman; 4 Bernstine, Jordan – freshman; 9 Sash, Tyler – freshman; 13 Godfrey, Charles – senior; 14 Moylan, Devan – senior; 16 Gardner, Drew – junior; 17 Murphy, Jayme – (redshirt) freshman; 17 Satterfield, Abe – freshman; 18 Tillison, Lance – (redshirt) freshman; 19 Shada, Adam – senior; 20 Everson, Cedric – freshman; 20 Kuchel, Nick – (redshirt) freshman; 29 Fletcher, Bradley – junior; 30 Greenwood, Brett – (redshirt) freshman; 32 Smith Derrick – (redshirt) freshman; 34 Rowell, Chris – sophomore; 36 Herbst, Taylor – sophomore	Kickers: 1 Murray, Daniel – (redshirt) freshman; 39 Signor, Austin – sophomore; Punters: 2 Guthrie, Eric – freshman; 5 Donahue, Ryan – (redshirt) freshman; Long snappers: 42 Murphy, Nick – freshman; 65 Schulze, Andrew – (redshirt) freshman; 65 Olszta, Daniel – senior; 67 Koeppel, Josh – (redshirt) freshman; 77 Huntrods, Clint – senior; – indicates redshirt (second-year freshman)

== Coaches ==
Name	Position	Year at Iowa
Kirk Ferentz	Head coach	9th
Ken O'Keefe	Offensive coordinator and Quarterbacks	9th
Norm Parker	Defensive coordinator and Linebackers	9th
Chris Doyle	Strength and conditioning	9th
Lester Erb	Receivers and Special Teams	8th
Carl Jackson	Running backs	22nd
Eric Johnson	Recruiting Coordinator and Tight Ends	9th
Reese Morgan	Offensive line	8th
Rick Kaczenski	Defensive line	3rd
Phil Parker	Defensive backs	9th
Darrell Wilson	Outside linebackers and Special Teams	6th
Bill Dervrich	Director of football operations	28th
James Dobson	Strength and conditioning Assistant	9th
Seth Wallace	Defensive Graduate Assistant Coach	2nd
Ned Amendola	Director, UI Sports Medicine Center	6th
Matthew Engelbert	Video Coordinator	19th
Paul Federici	Director of Athletic Training Services	4th
Bob Rahfeldt	Assistant Video Coordinator	11th
Scott Southmayd	Quality control Director	6th
John Streif	Assistant Athletic Trainer	35th

== Game summaries ==
=== Northern Illinois ===
Team	1	2	3	4	Total
• Iowa	0	13	3	0	16
Northern Illinois	0	3	0	0	3

- Date: Saturday, September 1
- Location: Soldier Field, Chicago, Illinois
- Game start: 3:30
- TV announcers (ESPNU): Doug Bell, Charles Arbuckle

Playing in Soldier Field in Chicago, the Hawkeyes defeated the Northern Illinois Huskies 16–3. Albert Young ran for 144 yards and a touchdown as Iowa's defense kept the Huskies from scoring a touchdown. Damian Sims also made his mark by running for 110 yards. The Hawkeyes held Northern Illinois to 21 yards rushing, and Charles Godfrey intercepted two Dan Nicholson passes. Sophomore quarterback Jake Christensen opened the season with 133 yards and one touchdown.

=== Syracuse ===
Team	1	2	3	4	Total
Syracuse	0	0	0	0	0
• Iowa	14	14	7	0	35

- Date: Saturday, September 8
- Location: Kinnick Stadium, Iowa City, Iowa
- Game start: 8:00
- TV announcers (BTN): Mark Neely, Glen Mason, Marshall Harris

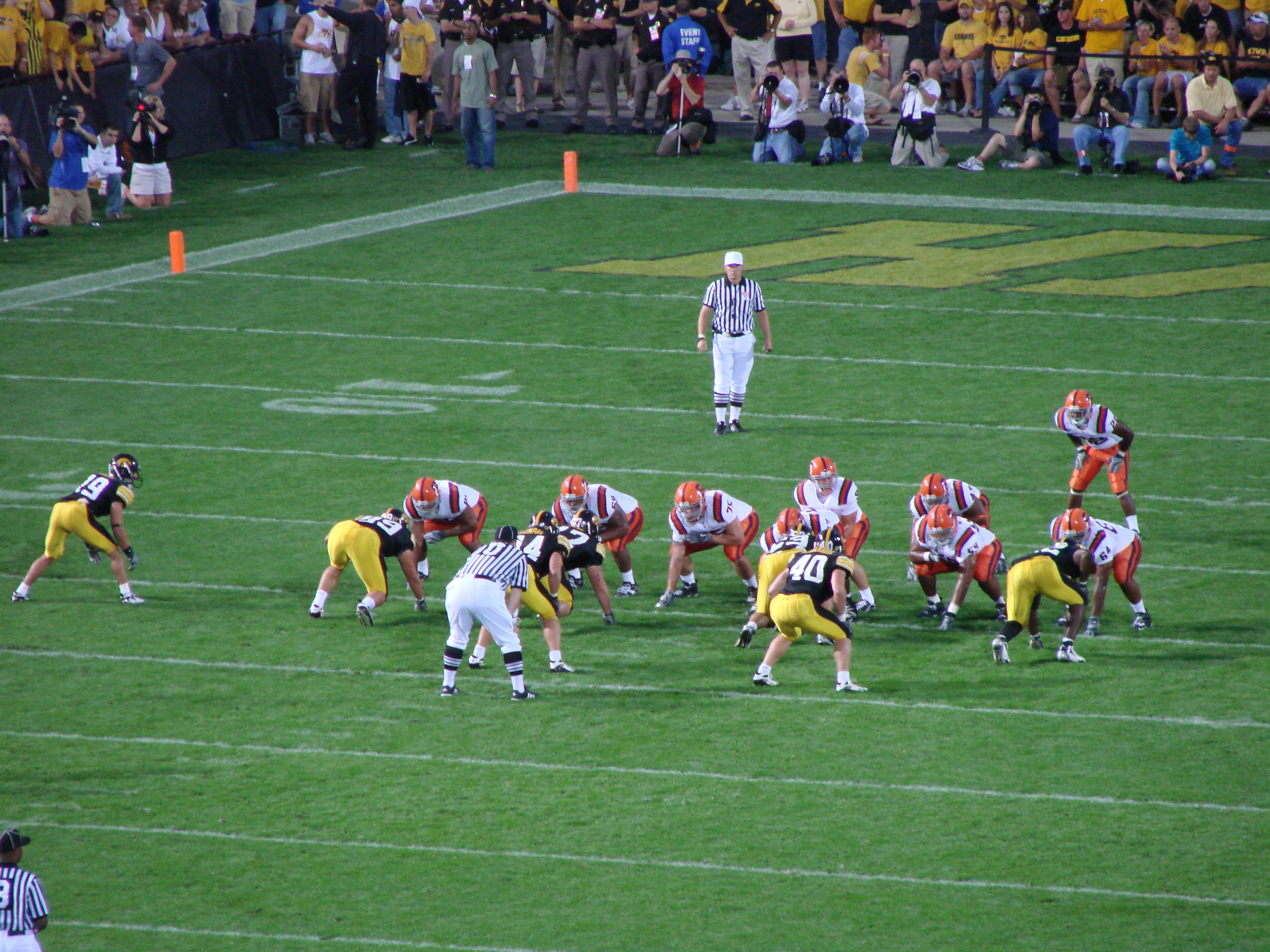
Iowa's defense lines up against Syracuse on September 9, 2007.

Behind a strong defensive performance, the Hawkeyes shut out the Syracuse Orange at Kinnick Stadium. Rebounding from a shaky performance against Northern Illinois, Christensen threw for 278 yards and four touchdowns, three of them to tight end Tony Moeaki. On special teams, Kenny Iwebema blocked two field goals to help preserve the worst loss for Syracuse coach Greg Robinson in his tenure with the Orange. After the game, Syracuse running back Curtis Brinkley said:

We need to be a lot more fundamentally sound, there were a lot of missed assignments and there were a lot of people not hitting their targets. There's a little bit of everything we need to fix up.

The 35-point loss was Syracuse's most-lopsided since a 51–14 loss to Georgia Tech in the 2004 Champs Sports Bowl.

=== Iowa State ===
Team	1	2	3	4	Total
Iowa	0	0	10	3	13
• Iowa St	6	6	0	3	15

- Date: Saturday, September 15
- Location: Jack Trice Stadium, Ames, Iowa
- Game start: 1:30 p.m. EST
- TV announcers (Versus): Ron Thulin, Kelly Stouffer, Lewis Johnson
- Source: ESPN

Scoring summary
1	10:02	ISU	Bret Culbertson 21-yard field goal	ISU 3-0
1	3:44	ISU	Bret Culbertson 33-yard field goal	ISU 6-0
2	11:48	ISU	Bret Culbertson 42-yard field goal	ISU 9-0
2	4:35	ISU	Bret Culbertson 40-yard field goal	ISU 12-0
3	9:50	IOWA	Jake Christensen 11-yard run (Austin Signor kick)	ISU 12-7
3	5:35	IOWA	Austin Signor 36-yard field goal	ISU 12-10
4	3:38	IOWA	Austin Signor 41-yard field goal	IOWA 13-12
4	0:01	ISU	Bret Culbertson 28-yard field goal	ISU 15-13

Iowa State kicked its way to a 15–13 victory in Ames.

=== Wisconsin ===
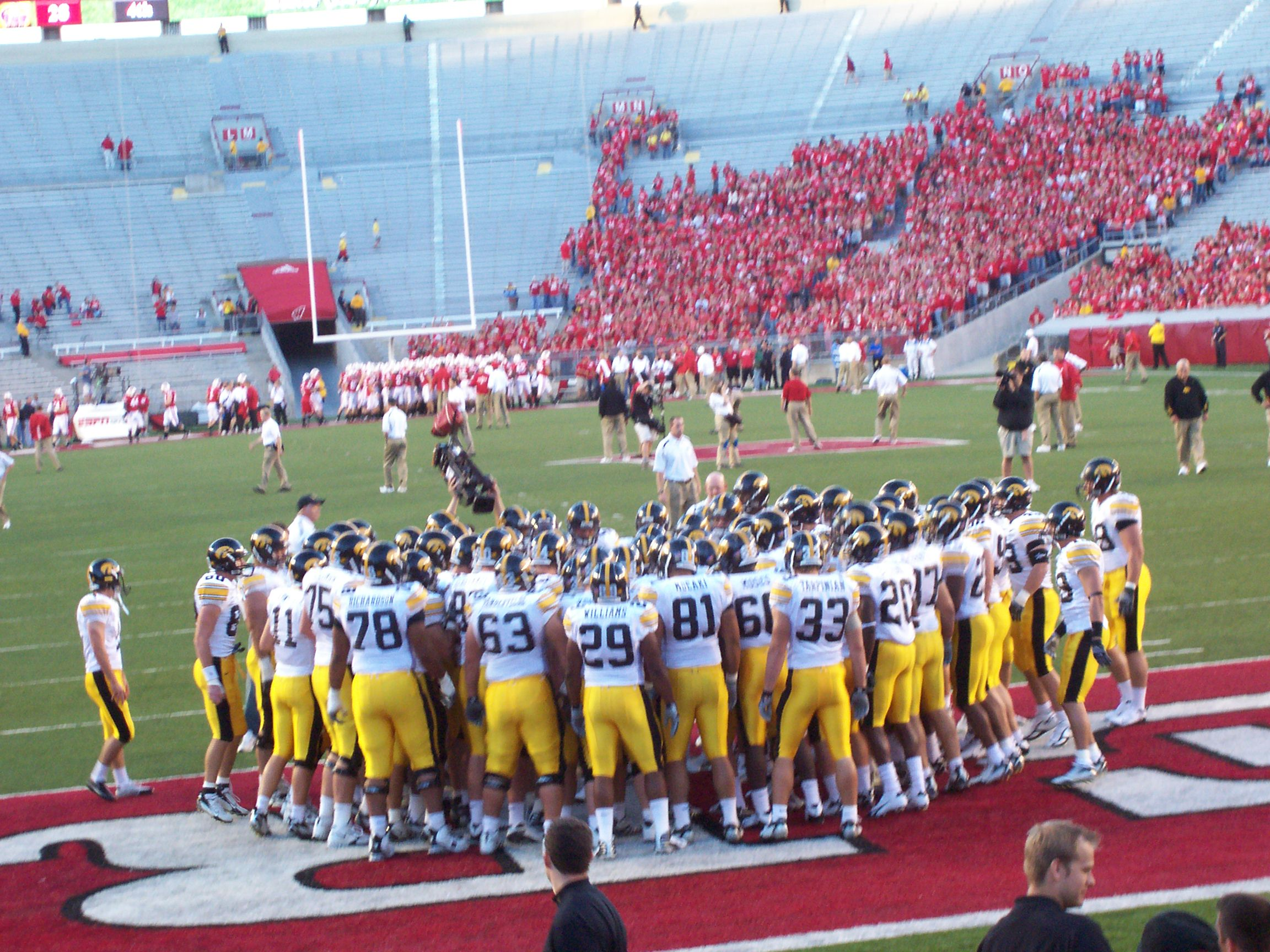
Huddle before Wisconsin game

Team	1	2	3	4	Total
Iowa	0	10	0	3	13
• Wisconsin	0	7	0	10	17

- Date: Saturday, September 22
- Location: Camp Randall Stadium, Madison, Wisconsin
- Game start: 8:00
- TV announcers (ABC): Brent Musburger, Kirk Herbstreit, Lisa Salters

Iowa's defense forced three Wisconsin turnovers, but could not hold off the Badgers' 4th quarter rally, losing 17–13.

=== Indiana ===
Team	1	2	3	4	Total
• Indiana	7	14	7	10	38
Iowa	0	7	6	7	20

- Date: Saturday, September 29
- Location: Kinnick Stadium, Iowa City, Iowa
- Game start: Noon
- TV announcers (BTN): Mark Neely, Glen Mason, Marshall Harris

Iowa was unable to contain a scoring explosion from Indiana, including three early touchdowns by Hoosier quarterback Kellen Lewis. Iowa added to its difficulties with penalties and breakdowns in pass protection. Although quarterback Jake Christensen passed for 308 yards and three touchdowns, he was sacked nine times, including four by Jammie Kirlew. The Hawkeyes also missed two field goals and an extra point.

=== Penn State ===
Team	1	2	3	4	Total
Iowa	0	0	0	7	7
• Penn St	0	13	7	7	27

- Date: Saturday, October 6
- Location: Beaver Stadium, University Park, Pennsylvania
- Game start: 3:30
- TV announcers (ABC/ESPN2): Bob Wischusen, David Norrie, Jimmy Dykes

Quarterback Jake Christensen was sacked twice, and the Hawkeyes were held scoreless until an interception near the Penn State end zone set up Trey Stross' 4th-quarter touchdown reception in a 27–7 blowout loss on the road at Penn State. Iowa was held to eight first downs while Penn State had 26.

=== Illinois ===
Team	1	2	3	4	Total
Illinois	3	0	3	0	6
• Iowa	0	3	7	0	10

- Date: Saturday, October 13
- Location: Kinnick Stadium, Iowa City, Iowa
- Game start: Noon
- TV announcers (ESPN2): Pam Ward, Ray Bentley, Quint Kessenich

Entering the game, Iowa had lost eight straight Big Ten games, with their last win a 47–17 decision over Purdue on October 7, 2006. Illinois, however, entered the game ranked 18th in the country, and was looking to become bowl eligible with a win over the Hawkeyes.

From the very beginning, the game was a defensive one. The Hawkeyes held Illinois running back Rashard Mendenhall to 67 yards, and slowed the nation's fifth-best rushing offense to 137 yards total. But the Illinois defense remained strong against the run, and held the Hawkeyes to a three yards per rush average.

Illinois did not trail until late in the third quarter, when Iowa quarterback Jake Christensen found tight end Brandon Myers down the middle for the touchdown. With the score at 10–6 in favor of the Hawkeyes, the Illini made a switch to Eddie McGee at quarterback, after starter Isiah Williams had a fumble recovered by Iowa. With McGee in, the Illini appeared to have stunned the Kinnick Stadium crowd with an 83-yard touchdown pass, but it was called back due to an Illinois penalty.

Despite the penalty, Illinois was not done. On Illinois' final drive, McGee drove the Illini down to the Iowa 12 with passes of 28 and 24 yards to Arrelious Benn. But with 1:12 left in the game, a McGee pass was intercepted at the goal line by Iowa's Brett Greenwood. The win was Iowa's first over a ranked team since 2005.

=== Purdue ===
Team	1	2	3	4	Total
Iowa	3	0	3	0	6
• Purdue	7	7	7	10	31

- Date: October 20
- Location: Ross–Ade Stadium, West Lafayette, Indiana
- Game start: Noon
- TV announcers (ESPN2): Pam Ward, Ray Bentley, Joe Schad

=== Michigan State ===
Team	1	2	3	4	OT	2OT	Total
Michigan St	7	10	0	3	7	0	27
• Iowa	0	3	14	3	7	7	34

- Date: Saturday, October 27
- Location: Kinnick Stadium, Iowa City, Iowa
- Game start: Noon
- TV announcers (ESPN2): Dave Pasch, Andre Ware, & Rob Simmelkjaer

Scoring summary
1	5:10	MSU	Jehuu Caulcrick 1-yard run (Brett Swenson kick)	MSU 7-0
2	14:10	MSU	Brett Swenson 46-yard field goal	MSU 10-0
2	6:40	IOWA	Daniel Murray 43-yard field goal	MSU 10-3
2	2:12	MSU	Jehuu Caulcrick 1-yard run (Brett Swenson kick)	MSU 17-3
3	10:07	IOWA	Albert Young 26-yard run (Daniel Murray kick)	MSU 17-10
3	3:57	IOWA	Albert Young 3-yard run (Daniel Murray kick)	Tied 17-17
4	10:05	IOWA	Daniel Murray 47-yard field goal	IOWA 20-17
4	0:04	MSU	Brett Swenson 29-yard field goal	Tied 20-20
OT		MSU	Jehuu Caulcrick 3-yard run (Brett Swenson kick)	MSU 27-20
OT		IOWA	Paul Chaney 23-yard pass from Jake Christensen (Daniel Murray kick)	Tied 27-27
2OT		IOWA	Jevon Pugh 1-yard run (Daniel Murray kick)	IOWA 34-27

Iowa escaped with an overtime win.

=== Northwestern ===
Team	1	2	3	4	Total
• Iowa	0	7	7	14	28
Northwestern	14	0	3	0	17

- Date: Saturday, November 3
- Location: Ryan Field, Evanston, Illinois
- Game start: Noon
- TV announcers (ESPN2): Pam Ward, Ray Bentley, Rob Simmelkjaer

The Hawkeyes were largely outplayed in the first half but benefited from an Adrian Clayborn field goal block that kept it a one possession game going into the locker room. A motivational halftime speech by Kirk Ferentz propelled them to dominate the second in which they forced four turnovers and outscored the Wildcats 21–3.

=== Minnesota ===
Team	1	2	3	4	Total
Minnesota	0	10	0	6	16
• Iowa	14	7	0	0	21

- Date: November 10
- Location: Kinnick Stadium
- Game start: 12:00 p.m. EST
- TV announcers (BTN): Wayne Larrivee, Chris Martin, Marshall Harris

Scoring summary
Q1	3:51	IOWA	Myers 8 yard pass from Christensen (Murray kick)	IOWA 7–0
Q1	:13	IOWA	Young 1 yard run (Murray kick)	IOWA 14–0
Q2	4:33	MINN	Valentine 1 yard run (Monroe kick)	IOWA 14–7
Q2	:50	IOWA	Young 12 yard run (Murray kick)	IOWA 21–7
Q2	:00	MINN	Monroe 54 yard field goal	IOWA 21–10
Q4	1:38	MINN	Decker 22 yard pass from Weber (pass failed)	IOWA 21–16

Iowa recaptured the bronze pig in Iowa City.

=== Western Michigan ===
Team	1	2	3	4	Total
• Western Michigan	12	7	6	3	28
Iowa	0	6	7	6	19

- Date: Saturday, November 17
- Location: Kinnick Stadium, Iowa City, Iowa
- Game start: 3:30
- TV announcers (BTN): Mark Neely, Glen Mason, Marshall Harris

Mid-American Conference member Western Michigan surprised the Hawkeyes, 28–19, in Iowa City.

== Team players in the 2008 NFL draft ==
Player	Position	Round	Pick	NFL club
Charles Godfrey	CB	3	67	Carolina Panthers
Kenny Iwebema	DE	4	116	Arizona Cardinals
Mike Humpal	LB	6	188	Pittsburgh Steelers
