= 2007 Syracuse Orange football team =

American college football season

2007 Syracuse Orange football
- Conference: Big East Conference
- Record: 2–10 (1–6 Big East)
- Head coach: Greg Robinson (3rd season)
- Offensive coordinator: Brian White (2nd season)
- Offensive scheme: Multiple
- Defensive coordinator: Steve Russ (1st season)
- Base defense: 4–3
- Home stadium: Carrier Dome

2007 Big East Conference football standings
	Conf.			Overall
Team	W		L	W		L
No. 6 West Virginia $+	5	–	2	11	–	2
Connecticut +	5	–	2	9	–	4
No. 17 Cincinnati	4	–	3	10	–	3
South Florida	4	–	3	9	–	4
Rutgers	3	–	4	8	–	5
Louisville	3	–	4	6	–	6
Pittsburgh	3	–	4	5	–	7
Syracuse	1	–	6	2	–	10
$ – BCS representative as conference champion; + – Conference co-champions; Rankings from AP Poll

The 2007 Syracuse Orange football team competed in football on behalf of Syracuse University during the 2007 NCAA Division I FBS football season. The Orange were coached by Greg Robinson and played their home games at the Carrier Dome in Syracuse, New York.

== Schedule ==
Date	Time	Opponent	Site	TV	Result	Attendance
August 31	8:00 pm	Washington*	Carrier Dome; Syracuse, New York	ESPN	L 12-42	40,329
September 8	8:00 pm	at Iowa*	Kinnick Stadium; Iowa City, Iowa	BTN	L 0-35	70,585
September 15	12:00 pm	Illinois*	Carrier Dome; Syracuse, NY	ESPNU	L 20-41	34,188
September 22	12:00 pm	at No. 18 Louisville	Papa John's Cardinal Stadium; Louisville, Kentucky	ESPN+	W 38-35	40,922
September 29	3:00 pm	at Miami (OH)*	Yager Stadium; Oxford, Ohio	ONN	L 14–17	16,800
October 6	12:00 pm	No. 13 West Virginia	Carrier Dome; Syracuse, NY (rivalry)	ESPN+	L 14-55	35,345
October 13	12:00 pm	Rutgers	Carrier Dome; Syracuse, NY	ESPN+	L 14-38	36,226
October 20	4:00 pm	Buffalo*	Carrier Dome; Syracuse, NY	ESPNU	W 20-12	30,897
November 3	12:00 pm	at Pittsburgh	Heinz Field; Pittsburgh, Pennsylvania (rivalry)	ESPN+	L 17-20	31,374
November 10	12:00 pm	South Florida	Carrier Dome; Syracuse, NY	ESPN+	L 10-41	38,039
November 17	12:00 pm	at No. 25 Connecticut	Rentschler Field; East Hartford, Connecticut (rivalry)	ESPN2	L 7-30	40,000
November 24	7:15 pm	No. 24 Cincinnati	Carrier Dome; Syracuse, NY	ESPNU	L 31-52	30,040
*Non-conference game; Rankings from AP Poll released prior to the game; All times are in Eastern time

== Game summaries ==
=== Washington ===
	1	2	3	4	Total
Huskies	0	14	21	7	42
Orange	3	3	0	6	12

Syracuse opened the 2007 season with a 42-14 loss to Washington in the Carrier Dome. The Orange began the game with a field goal and managed to hold the Huskies at bay for their first two drives. However, after back-to-back three-and-outs, Washington responded with two touchdown drives of 80 yards apiece. The Huskies scored on each of their three drives in the third quarter to take a 35-6 lead into the fourth quarter.

Freshman quarterback Andrew Robinson registered 199 yards in his first career start on 20-of-32 passing. Robinson was also sacked seven times. Washington was led on the ground by Louis Rankin. The senior ran for 152 yards on 17 carries. Rankin scored three touchdowns, including a 47-yard run on the opening drive of the third quarter. Huskies quarterback Jake Locker completed 14-of-19 passes for 142 yards. He also ran for two touchdowns in the win. Washington outgained Syracuse 302-8 on the ground.

"We went on defense and had a chance to make a four or five-yard loss on a run and we missed the tackle," said Orange head coach Greg Robinson after the game. "We had the tackle, but we didn't secure it and let the guy out the backside and that's just the discipline of the defense not having backside containment to let that guy out the backdoor. Really I thought for a period of time we kept shooting ourselves in the foot on both sides of the ball. I give credit to Washington. They did a good job."

=== Iowa ===
	1	2	3	4	Total
Orange	0	0	0	0	0
Hawkeyes	14	14	7	0	35

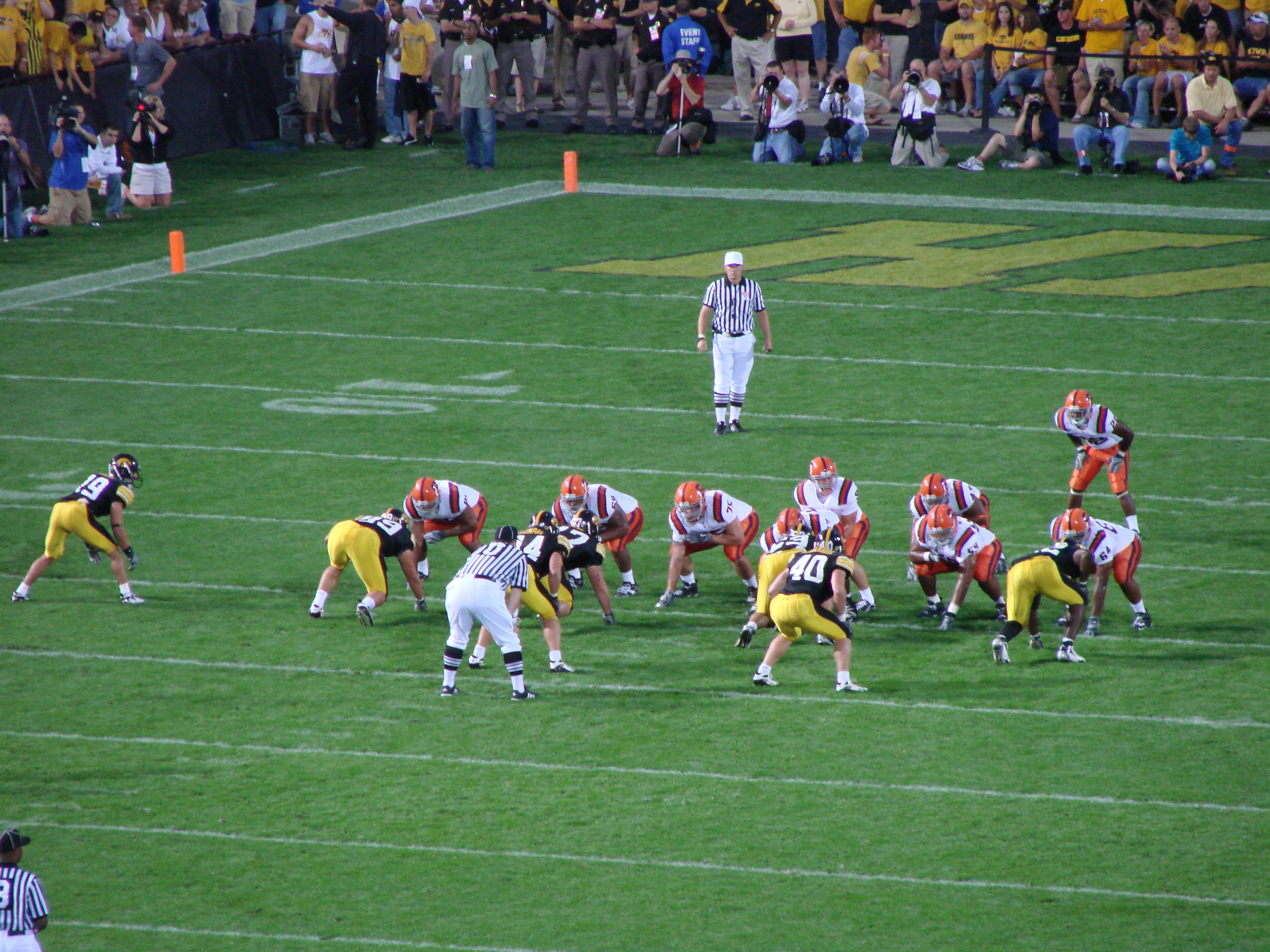
Iowa's defense lines up against Syracuse on September 9, 2007.

Syracuse and Iowa met in a rematch of the 2006 thriller in the Carrier Dome. The Orange fell 20-13 in double overtime to the Hawkeyes, after the 'Cuse couldn't score on seven attempts from inside the two-yard line.

The 2007 meeting between the two teams was the exact opposite of the 2006 matchup. Behind a strong defensive performance, the Hawkeyes shut out the Syracuse Orange 35-0 at Kinnick Stadium. Rebounding from a shaky performance against Northern Illinois, Christensen threw for 278 yards and four touchdowns, three of them to tight end Tony Moeaki. After a punt on their opening drive, the Hawkeyes scored three consecutive touchdowns, two on passes of more than 30 yards. Iowa quarterback Jake Christensen connected with Tony Moeaki on a 52-yard touchdown pass to give the Hawkeyes a 7-0 lead. Christensen found running back Albert Young for a 36-yard touchdown reception a drive later, after Iowa picked off Syracuse in its own half of the field.

The one bright spot for the 'Cuse came on the defensive end. Despite giving up 35 points in the defeat, Syracuse caught two interceptions and forced on fumble. The first interception came late in the first half off a pass from Christensen. Syracuse's scoring chances were limited to two field goal attempts. Orange kicker Patrick Shadle had a 38 and a 39 yard attempt blocked in the loss. On special teams, Kenny Iwebema blocked two field goals to help preserve the worst loss for Syracuse coach Greg Robinson in his tenure with the Orange. The 35-point loss was Syracuse's most-lopsided since a 51–14 loss to Georgia Tech in the 2004 Champs Sports Bowl. After the game, Syracuse running back Curtis Brinkley said:

We need to be a lot more fundamentally sound, there were a lot of missed assignments and there were a lot of people not hitting their targets. There's a little bit of everything we need to fix up.

=== Illinois ===
	1	2	3	4	Total
Fighting Illini	14	3	17	7	41
Orange	0	0	10	10	20

Syracuse's second straight Big Ten opponent came when the 'Cuse met Illinois. The Orange had defeated the Illini a year before, 31-21 in Champaign. Much like the previous week in Iowa, Syracuse struggled to stop the Illinois offense. The Illini opened the game with a 70-yard drive for a touchdown. Illinois scored after six plays, the last a 22-yard touchdown pass from Juice Williams to tight end Jeff Cumberland. The Illini scored later in the first quarter on a 2-yard run by Rashard Mendenhall.

Mendenhall wasn't through there. He ran for two more touchdowns in the win, including a 50-yard run late in the third quarter. Mendenhall totaled 150 yards on 16 carries and finished with 3 touchdowns.

Offensively for Syracuse, the Orange started out slow. Syracuse didn't record a first down until the second quarter and didn't break through until the third quarter when kicker Patrick Shadle kicked for a 44-yard field goal. Syracuse scored a touchdown later in the third off a 2-yard run by Jeremy Sellers.

The offensive improvements were outdone by Iowa. The Hawkeyes finished the game with scores of their last five possessions. Three of those drive resulted in touchdowns.

"Obviously, I’m frustrated and I want to keep working and getting better," said Syracuse head coach Greg Robinson after the game. "There were some things in that game that we can still grow from and obviously we’re a team that is a work-in-progress, big time. I thought there were some things that were encouraging – especially on offensive side of the ball. I saw a couple of things on defense from a couple of young players and we’ll see what happens."

=== Louisville ===
	1	2	3	4	Total
Orange	7	14	10	7	38
Cardinals	0	7	7	21	35

Syracuse delivered its first win of the 2007 season on the road in Louisville. The Orange upset the #18/19 Cardinals 38-35, thanks to an incredible offensive performance. Freshman quarterback Andrew Robinson set the pace of the game early when he connected with wide receiver Taj Smith for a 79-yard touchdown reception on the first play.

The scoring halted until the second quarter when Louisville quarterback Brian Brohm completed a 4-yard touchdown pass to Scott Kuhn. On the ensuing kickoff, Syracuse's Max Suter broke a tackle and sprinted for a 93-yard touchdown return, the first since Kevin Johnson returned a kick for 100 yards against Miami in 1998.

=== Miami (OH) ===
	1	2	3	4	Total
Orange	0	0	7	7	14
RedHawks	0	14	0	3	17

=== West Virginia ===
	1	2	3	4	Total
Mountaineers	14	17	10	14	55
Orange	7	0	7	0	14

=== Rutgers ===
	1	2	3	4	Total
Scarlet Knights	7	17	0	14	38
Orange	14	0	0	0	14

=== Buffalo ===
	1	2	3	4	Total
Bulls	3	0	3	6	12
Orange	3	14	0	3	20

=== Pittsburgh ===
	1	2	3	4	Total
Orange	0	3	7	7	17
Panthers	0	10	0	10	20

=== South Florida ===
	1	2	3	4	Total
Bulls	7	13	21	0	41
Orange	0	3	7	0	10

=== Connecticut ===
	1	2	3	4	Total
Orange	0	0	0	7	7
Huskies	14	7	3	6	30

=== Cincinnati ===
	1	2	3	4	Total
Bearcats	14	14	14	10	52
Orange	3	14	14	0	31

== Rankings ==
Ranking movements Legend: — = Not ranked
	Week															
Poll	Pre	1	2	3	4	5	6	7	8	9	10	11	12	13	14	Final
AP	—	—	—	—	—	—	—	—	—	—	—	—	—	—	—	—
Coaches	—	—	—	—	—	—	—	—	—	—	—	—	—	—	—	—
Harris	Not released				—	—	—	—	—	—	—	—	—	—	—	Not released
BCS	Not released							—	—	—	—	—	—	—	—	Not released

== Coaching staff ==
- Greg Robinson - Head Coach/Co-Defensive Coordinator
- Mitch Browning - Offensive Coordinator/Tight Ends & Offensive Tackles
- Derrick Jackson - Co-Defensive Coordinator/Defensive Line
- Phil Earley - Quarterbacks
- Dan Conley - Linebackers
- Jim Salgado - Cornerbacks/Secondary
- Scott Spencer - Safeties
- Randy Trivers - Running Backs
- Chris White - Wide Receivers
- Chris Wiesehan - Offensive Line

== Statistics ==
=== Team ===
	Team	Opp
Scoring	197	418
Points per game	16.4	34.8
First downs	181	287
Rushing	58	122
Passing	112	146
Penalty	11	19
Total offense	3503	5625
Avg per play	4.6	6.2
Avg per game	291.9	468.8
Fumbles-Lost	24-10	11-5
Penalties-Yards	85-707	109-885
Avg per game	58.9	73.8

	Team	Opp
Punts-Yards	80-3356	52-2025
Avg per punt	42.0	38.9
Time of possession/Game	27:31	32:29
3rd down conversions	46/164 28%	82/174 47%
4th down conversions	7/18 39%	6/13 46%
Touchdowns scored	24	53
Field goals-Attempts	10-14 71%	16-22 73%
PAT-Attempts	23-24 96%	52-53 98%
Attendance	245,064	199,681
Games/Avg per Game	7/35,009	5/39,936

==== Scores by quarter ====
	1	2	3	4	Total
Syracuse	37	51	62	47	197
Opponents	87	130	103	98	418

=== Offense ===
==== Rushing ====
Name	GP-GS	Att	Gain	Loss	Net	Avg	TD	Long	Avg/G
Curtis Brinkley	8-8	111	416	45	371	3.3	2	29	46.4
Doug Hogue	9-4	77	275	24	251	3.3	1	20	27.9
Paul Chiara	12-0	21	97	2	95	4.5	1	22	7.9
Jeremy Sellers	12-0	21	50	1	49	2.3	1	9	4.1
Max Suter	12-1	9	42	4	38	4.2	0	12	3.2
Derrell Smith	12-0	10	28	6	22	2.2	0	8	1.8
Taj Smith	12-12	5	16	0	16	3.2	0	7	1.3
Tony Fiammetta	11-8	3	8	0	8	2.7	0	4	0.7
John Barker	12-0	1	3	0	3	3.0	0	3	0.2
Cameron Dantley	8-1	13	12	35	-23	-1.8	0	6	-2.9
TEAM	9-0	9	0	38	-38	-4.2	0	0	-4.2
Andrew Robinson	11-11	95	273	312	-39	-0.4	0	18	-3.5
Total	12	375	1220	467	753	2.0	5	29	62.8
Opponents	12	515	2687	193	2494	4.8	30	75	207.8

==== Passing ====
Name	GP-GS	Effic	Att-Cmp-Int	Pct	Yds	TD	Lng	Avg/G
Andrew Robinson	11-11	125.69	154-292-7	52.7	2192	13	79	199.3
Cameron Dantley	8-1	117.08	48-90-3	53.3	558	5	56	69.8
TEAM	9-0	0.00	0-1-0	0.0	0	0	0	0.0
Total	12	123.34	202-383-10	52.7	2750	18	79	229.2
Opponents	12	147.07	267-393-9	67.9	3131	20	63	260.9

==== Receiving ====
Name	GP-GS	No.	Yds	Avg	TD	Long	Avg/G
Mike Williams	12-12	60	837	13.9	10	61	69.8
Taj Smith	12-12	44	822	18.7	5	79	68.5
Jawad Nesheiwat	12-10	17	270	15.9	2	48	22.5
Rice Moss	12-1	13	150	11.5	0	20	12.5
Paul Chiara	12-0	12	93	7.8	0	20	7.8
Tony Fiammetta	11-8	12	75	6.2	0	15	6.8
Curtis Brinkley	8-8	9	149	16.6	0	62	18.6
Da'Mon Merkerson	10-1	8	101	12.6	1	42	10.1
Lavar Lobdell	12-0	8	86	10.8	0	14	7.2
Mike Owen	12-3	5	51	10.2	0	18	4.2
Dan Sheeran	12-1	4	24	6.0	0	13	2.0
Doug Hogue	9-4	3	31	10.3	0	19	3.4
Jeremy Sellers	12-0	2	31	15.5	0	27	2.6
Arthur Kapalanga	11-0	2	15	7.5	0	10	1.4
Derrell Smith	12-0	2	8	4.0	0	9	0.7
Kyle Bell	2-0	1	7	7.0	0	7	3.5
Total	12	202	2750	13.6	18	79	229.2
Opponents	12	267	3131	11.7	20	63	260.9

=== Defense Leaders ===
Note: This list includes only a select number of defensive leaders. For the complete list, click

Name	GP-GS	Tackles				Sacks	Pass defense		Interceptions				Fumbles		Blkd Kick
Name	GP-GS	Solo	Ast	Total	TFL-Yds	No-Yds	BrUp	QBH	No.-Yds	Avg	TD	Long	Rcv-Yds	FF	Blkd Kick
Joe Fields	12-12	53	44	97	2.5-4	0.0-0	2	1	4-62	15.5	0	35	1-0	0	0
Jake Flaherty	12-12	45	50	95	6.5-26	1.0-6	0	0	0-0	0.0	0	0	0-0	0	0
Jameel McClain	12-12	39	38	77	6.0-24	1.5-12	3	4	1-38	38.0	0	38	1-0	2	1
Mike Holmes	12-8	40	24	64	2.0-3	0.0-0	2	0	0-0	0.0	0	0	0-0	0	0
Arthur Jones	11-11	32	19	51	17.5-43	1.0-4	0	0	0-0	0.0	0	0	0-0	0	1
Total	12	556	387	943	63-197	9-65	21	8	9-213	23.7	0	52	5-2	8	4
Opponents	12	458	282	740	87-411	54-324	41	25	10-114	11.4	2	49	10-16	12	3

=== Special teams ===
Name	Punting								Kickoffs				
Name	No.	Yds	Avg	Long	TB	FC	I20	Blkd	No.	Yds	Avg	TB	OB
Rob Long	75	3139	41.9	73	8	22	21	0	--	--	--	--	--
John Barker	4	217	54.2	71	1	0	3	0	--	--	--	--	--
TEAM	1	0	0.0	0	0	0	0	1	--	--	--	--	--
Patrick Shadle	--	--	--	--	--	--	--	--	44	2484	56.5	0	1
Total	80	3356	42.0	73	9	22	24	1	44	2484	56.5	0	1
Opponents	52	2025	38.9	63	3	20	22	0	78	4835	62.0	5	1

Name	Punt returns					Kick returns				
Name	No.	Yds	Avg	TD	Long	No.	Yds	Avg	TD	Long
Max Suter	--	--	--	--	--	51	1299	25.5	1	93
Mike Holmes	--	--	--	--	--	14	352	25.1	0	64
Bruce Williams	5	13	2.6	0	11	--	--	--	--	--
Randy McKinnon	--	--	--	--	--	3	54	18.0	0	23
Ryan Howard	3	32	10.7	0	13	1	4	4.0	0	4
Paul Chiara	2	1	0.5	0	1	--	--	--	--	--
Total	10	46	4.6	0	13	69	1709	24.8	1	93
Opponents	33	430	13.0	0	53	41	906	22.1	0	64
