= 2007 Big Ten Conference football season =

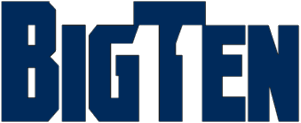
- League: NCAA Division I FBS (Football Bowl Subdivision)
- Sport: football
- Duration: August, 2007 through January, 2008
- Teams: 11
- TV partner(s): ABC, ESPN, ESPN2, Big Ten Network

2008 NFL Draft
- Top draft pick: Jake Long (Michigan)
- Picked by: Miami Dolphins, first round (1st overall)

Regular Season
- Season Champions: Ohio State
- Season MVP: Rashard Mendenhall (Offensive) and James Laurinaitis (Defensive)

Football seasons
- 2006 2008

2007 Big Ten Conference football standings
	Conf.			Overall
Team	W		L	W		L
No. 5 Ohio State $	7	–	1	11	–	2
No. 18 Michigan	6	–	2	9	–	4
No. 20 Illinois %	6	–	2	9	–	4
No. 24 Wisconsin	5	–	3	9	–	4
Penn State	4	–	4	9	–	4
Iowa	4	–	4	6	–	6
Purdue	3	–	5	8	–	5
Indiana	3	–	5	7	–	6
Michigan State	3	–	5	7	–	6
Northwestern	3	–	5	6	–	6
Minnesota	0	–	8	1	–	11
$ – BCS representative as conference champion; % – BCS at-large representative; Rankings from AP Poll

The 2007 season was the Big Ten Conference's 112th overall. For the second straight year, Ohio State won the conference title and advanced to the national championship game.

== Bowl games ==
Date	Bowl Game	Big Ten Team	Opp. Team	Score
Dec. 26, 2007	Motor City Bowl	Purdue	Central Michigan	51-48
Dec. 28, 2007	Champs Sports Bowl	Michigan State	Boston College	21-24
Dec. 29, 2007	Alamo Bowl	Penn State	Texas A&M	24-17
Dec. 31, 2007	Insight Bowl	Indiana	Oklahoma State	33-49
Jan. 1, 2008	Outback Bowl	Wisconsin	Tennessee	17-21
Jan. 1, 2008	Capital One Bowl	Michigan	Florida	41-35
Jan. 1, 2008	Rose Bowl	Illinois	USC	17-49
Jan. 7, 2008	BCS National Championship	Ohio State	LSU	24-38
Bowl scores sourced from Sports-Reference.com

== All-Big Ten selections ==
=== Offense ===
Pos.	First Team		Second Team	
Pos.	Player	School	Player	School
QB	Chad Henne	Michigan	Kellen Lewis	Indiana
RB	Rashard Mendenhall	Illinois	Mike Hart	Michigan
RB	Chris Wells	Ohio State	Javon Ringer	Michigan State
WR	James Hardy	Indiana	Devin Thomas	Michigan State
WR	Mario Manningham	Michigan	Dorien Bryant	Purdue
C	A. Q. Shipley	Penn State	Ryan McDonald	Illinois
G	Martin O'Donnell	Illinois	Rich Ohrnberger	Penn State
G	Adam Kraus	Michigan	Kraig Urbik	Wisconsin
T	Jake Long	Michigan	Xavier Fulton	Illinois
T	Kirk Barton	Ohio State	Alex Boone	Ohio State
TE	Travis Beckum	Wisconsin	Dustin Keller	Purdue
K	Taylor Mehlhaff	Wisconsin	Austin Starr	Indiana

Pos.	First Team		Second Team	
Pos.	Player	School	Player	School
DL	Greg Middleton	Indiana	Terrance Taylor	Michigan
DL	Mitch King	Iowa	Jonal Saint-Dic	Michigan State
DL	Vernon Gholston	Ohio State	Cliff Avril	Purdue
DL	Maurice Evans	Penn State	Matt Shaughnessy	Wisconsin
LB	Jeremy Leman	Illinois	Shawn Crable	Michigan
LB	James Laurinaitis	Ohio State	Marcus Freeman	Ohio State
LB	Dan Connor	Penn State	Sean Lee	Penn State
DB	Vontae Davis	Illinois	Tracy Porter	Indiana
DB	Malcolm Jenkins	Ohio State	Charles Godfrey	Iowa
DB	Justin King	Penn State	Jamar Adams	Michigan
DB	Jack Ikegwuonu	Wisconsin	Dominique Barber	Minnesota
P	Jeremy Boone	Penn State	Ken DeBauche	Wisconsin

== Statistical leaders ==
Passing
Player	School	COMP	ATT	YDS	TD	INT
Curtis Painter	Purdue	356	569	3846	29	11
C. J. Bachér	Northwestern	318	521	3656	19	19
Kellen Lewis	Indiana	265	442	3043	28	10

Rushing
Player	School	ATT	YDS	YPC	TD
Rashard Mendenhall	Illinois	262	1681	6.4	17
Chris Wells	Ohio State	274	1609	5.9	15
Javon Ringer	Michigan State	245	1447	5.9	6
Mike Hart	Michigan	265	1361	5.1	14
Rodney Kinlaw	Penn State	243	1329	5.5	10

Receiving
Player	School	REC	YDS	YPR	TD
Devin Thomas	Michigan State	79	1260	15.9	8
Mario Manningham	Michigan	72	1174	16.3	12
James Hardy	Indiana	79	1125	14.2	16
Travis Beckum	Wisconsin	75	982	13.1	6

Tackles
Player	School	SOLO	AST	TOTAL
Dan Connor	Penn State	69	76	145
Sean Lee	Penn State	54	84	138
J Leman	Illinois	71	61	132
Adam Kadela	Northwestern	53	72	125

Sacks
Player	School	SACKS
Greg Middleton	Indiana	16.0
Vernon Gholston	Ohio State	14.0
Maurice Evans	Penn State	12.5

Interceptions
Player	School	INT
Shane Carter	Wisconsin	7
Tracy Porter	Indiana	6

== Awards ==
Bednarik Award

- LB Dan Connor, Penn State

Butkus Award

- LB James Laurinaitis, Ohio State

Bobby Dodd Coach of the Year Award

- Coach Lloyd Carr, Michigan

Liberty Mutual Coach of the Year Award

- Coach Ron Zook, Illinois

Broyles Award

- Assistant coach Jim Heacock, Ohio State
