= 2007 Minnesota Golden Gophers football team =

American college football season

2007 Minnesota Golden Gophers football
- Conference: Big Ten Conference
- Record: 1–11 (0–8 Big Ten)
- Head coach: Tim Brewster (1st season)
- Offensive coordinator: Mike Dunbar (1st season)
- Offensive scheme: Spread
- Defensive coordinator: Everett Withers (1st season)
- Base defense: 4–3
- Captains: Tony Brinkhaus; Amir Pinnix; Mike Sherels; John Shevlin; Steve Shidell; William VanDeSteeg
- Home stadium: Hubert H. Humphrey Metrodome

2007 Big Ten Conference football standings
	Conf.			Overall
Team	W		L	W		L
No. 5 Ohio State $	7	–	1	11	–	2
No. 18 Michigan	6	–	2	9	–	4
No. 20 Illinois %	6	–	2	9	–	4
No. 24 Wisconsin	5	–	3	9	–	4
Penn State	4	–	4	9	–	4
Iowa	4	–	4	6	–	6
Purdue	3	–	5	8	–	5
Indiana	3	–	5	7	–	6
Michigan State	3	–	5	7	–	6
Northwestern	3	–	5	6	–	6
Minnesota	0	–	8	1	–	11
$ – BCS representative as conference champion; % – BCS at-large representative; Rankings from AP Poll

The 2007 Minnesota Golden Gophers football team represented the University of Minnesota as a member of the Big Ten Conference during the 2007 NCAA Division I FBS football season. Led by first-year head coach Tim Brewster, the Golden Gophers compiled an overall record of 1–11 with a mark of 0–8 in conference play, placing last out of 11 teams in the Big Ten. Minnesota played home games at the Hubert H. Humphrey Metrodome in Minneapolis.

== Schedule ==
Date	Time	Opponent	Site	TV	Result	Attendance	Source
September 1	7:00 p.m.	Bowling Green*	Hubert H. Humphrey Metrodome; Minneapolis, MN	BTN	L 31–32 ^{OT}	49,253	
September 8	11:00 a.m.	Miami (Ohio)*	Hubert H. Humphrey Metrodome; Minneapolis, MN	BTN	W 41–35 ^{3OT}	45,383	
September 15	12:00 p.m.	at Florida Atlantic*	Dolphin Stadium; Miami Gardens, FL	ESPN360	L 39–42	10,759	
September 22	8:00 p.m.	Purdue	Hubert H. Humphrey Metrodome; Minneapolis, MN	ESPN2	L 31–45	47,483	
September 29	7:00 p.m.	No. 8 Ohio State	Hubert H. Humphrey Metrodome; Minneapolis, MN	ESPN2	L 7–30	51,611	
October 6	11:00 a.m.	at Indiana	Memorial Stadium; Bloomington, IN	BTN	L 20–40	32,009	
October 13	11:00 a.m.	at Northwestern	Ryan Field; Evanston, IL	BTN	L 48–49 ^{2OT}	23,314	
October 20	11:00 a.m.	North Dakota State*	Hubert H. Humphrey Metrodome; Minneapolis, MN	BTN	L 21–27	63,088	
October 27	2:30 p.m.	at No. 19 Michigan	Michigan Stadium; Ann Arbor, MI (Little Brown Jug)	ESPN Classic/ABC	L 10–34	109,432	
November 3	7:00 p.m.	Illinois^{†}	Hubert H. Humphrey Metrodome; Minneapolis, MN	BTN	L 17–44	46,604	
November 10	11:00 a.m.	at Iowa	Kinnick Stadium; Iowa City, IA (rivalry)	BTN	L 16–21	70,585	
November 17	2:30 p.m.	No. 24 Wisconsin	Hubert H. Humphrey Metrodome; Minneapolis, MN (rivalry)	BTN	L 34–41	59,116	
*Non-conference game; ^{†}Homecoming; Rankings from AP Poll released prior to the game; All times are in Central time

== Preseason ==
On January 15, 2007, it was reported on ESPN.com that Tim Brewster was the choice of University of Minnesota athletic director Joel Maturi to replace Glen Mason as the Gophers head coach. The following day, January 16, Minnesota associate athletic director Tom Wistrcill confirmed that Brewster was indeed the university's choice, with the contract signed in the early morning. Brewster was officially presented as the new head coach on Wednesday, January 17 at the McNamara Alumni Center on the University of Minnesota campus. At his first press conference, Brewster stated that his immediate goals for the program were to "win the Big Ten championship" and "take the Gopher Nation to Pasadena.". Shortly thereafter, while addressing Gopher fans during a basketball game at Williams Arena, Brewster reiterated these goals, along with a vow to "Recruit, recruit, recruit."

=== Off-field incidents ===
On April 6, 2007, Gopher players Alex Daniels, Keith Massey, and E.J. Jones were arrested on suspicion of rape of an 18-year-old Minneapolis woman at the University Village apartment complex. On April 9, 2007, they were released without being charged pending further investigation. On July 16, 2007, Dominic Jones was arrested and charged in Hennepin County District Court with criminal sexual conduct after video of the incident was discovered. All four players involved were kicked off the team.

== Game summaries ==
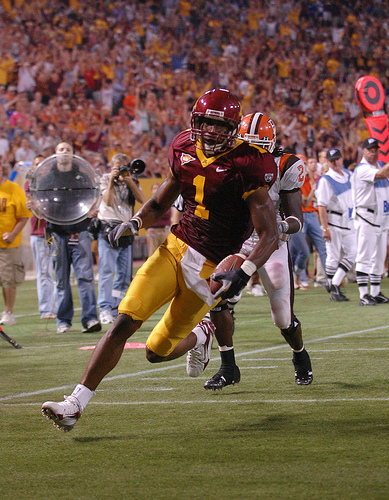
Ernie Wheelwright scored a touchdown against Bowling Green.

=== Bowling Green ===
	1	2	3	4	OT	Total
Falcons	14	7	0	3	8	32
Gophers	0	0	7	17	7	31

In Tim Brewster's first game as Gopher head coach, Bowling Green flew out to a 21–0 first half lead. The Gophers finally got in gear midway through the third quarter, and proceeded to score four straight times, the final score being a 33-yard Jason Giannini field goal to give Minnesota a 24–21 lead with 2:12 remaining. Bowling Green then drove down the field and kicked a 35-yard field goal with 0:03 left in the game to tie the score at 24–24 and send the game to overtime. In the overtime session, the Gophers took the ball first and scored a touchdown, scoring on a 22-yard Amir Pinnix run, and converting the extra point to go up 31–24. Bowling Green followed that up with a touchdown of their own, but instead of trying to tie the game with an extra point, the Falcons went for two. They converted it on a Marques Parks reception to win the game, 32–31.

=== Miami (OH) ===
	1	2	3	4	OT	2OT	3OT	Total
RedHawks	3	6	3	16	7	0	0	35
Gophers	7	7	0	14	7	0	6	41

Tim Brewster got his first win as a college head coach in a 41–35, three overtime victory. After the Gophers pulled out to a 28–12 lead midway through the 4th quarter, Miami started a furious comeback, tying the game on a 36-yard Trevor Cook field goal with 11 seconds left in regulation. In the first overtime both teams traded touchdowns. In the second overtime both teams missed potentially game winning field goals. In the third overtime, Gopher cornerback Jamal Harris intercepted a Daniel Raudabaugh pass in the endzone. The Gophers then took the ball and scored the game-winning touchdown on an Amir Pinnix 2-yard touchdown run. Going back to Insight Bowl last season, it was the third consecutive overtime game for the Gophers.

=== Florida Atlantic ===
	1	2	3	4	Total
Gophers	14	0	10	15	39
Owls	14	21	0	7	42

The Golden Gophers took their first regular season trip to Florida. Their only previous game in Florida was in the 2000 MicronPC.com Bowl. A back and forth first quarter left the score tied at 14. FAU then scored 21 unanswered points in the second quarter, giving a 35–14 margin at the half. A field goal and touchdown from the Gophers in the third quarter brought the Gophers eleven points away from tying the score. The Owls scored the deciding touchdown with under 12 minutes left in the game. Minnesota scored two more touchdowns, but the lead eventually proved insurmountable. The Gophers turned over the ball seven times (four interceptions and three fumbles).

=== Purdue ===
	1	2	3	4	Total
Boilermakers	17	7	14	7	45
Gophers	3	0	14	14	31

Purdue scored early and often against the Golden Gophers. On the first play of the game, Purdue scored a special teams touchdown when Dorien Bryant returned the opening kickoff the distance. Later in the first quarter Purdue scored an offensive touchdown on a Curtis Painter pass, and on the first play of the second quarter the Boilermakers scored a defensive touchdown on an interception return off an Adam Weber pass. Four first half turnovers made the Gophers comeback attempts difficult. Right before the half, Gophers cornerback Jamal Harris returned a blocked field goal and dropped the ball at about the 15 yard-line. Minnesota finally got in gear in the second half, scoring 28 points, but the Gopher defense could not stop Purdue, as the Boilermakers tacked on three more touchdowns to win the game 45–31.

=== Ohio State ===
	1	2	3	4	Total
#8 Buckeyes	14	6	3	7	30
Gophers	0	7	0	0	7

The Golden Gophers entered their second Big 10 game of the season against the No. 8 Ohio State Buckeyes with nothing to lose. In an attempt to gain an element of surprise, the Gophers warmed up on the field in their standard maroon home jerseys, but switched to new gold jerseys before taking the field for the game (alternatively described by the media as "mustard" or "garish"). Although Minnesota played better than it had previously in the season, the outmanned team fell victim to numerous mistakes that cost the Gophers several opportunities. With the construction of the new TCF Bank Stadium scheduled to be finished by the 2009 season, the Buckeyes are assured of never losing in the Metrodome, finishing with an 11–0 record since the Gophers moved to the Dome in 1982.

=== Indiana ===
	1	2	3	4	Total
Gophers	14	0	0	6	20
Hoosiers	14	13	6	7	40

Minnesota entered their first Big Ten road game of the season looking for their first conference victory. The Gophers gathered 392 yards of offense in a losing effort. Gophers quarterback Adam Weber passed for 280 yards, but also had two interceptions. Indiana connected on four field goal tries, ranging from 25 to 47 yards in length. Two of Minnesota's drives into Indiana territory were turned over on downs. Six of Minnesota's 12 drives started at or behind their own 20-yard line.

=== Northwestern ===
	1	2	3	4	OT	2OT	Total
Gophers	0	21	14	0	7	6	48
Wildcats	7	7	7	14	7	7	49

The Gophers continued Big 10 play by visiting the Northwestern Wildcats at Ryan Field. Before a crowd of 23,314, the Gophers took a 21-point lead in the 2nd half, ahead 35–14 with 6 minutes, 18 seconds left in the third quarter. However, the Wildcats were able to tie the game by taking advantage of two interceptions and making the tying score with a 4-yard touchdown pass on fourth-and-goal with 8 seconds remaining. Going into the second overtime, Tim Brewster, who turned 47 that day, elected to for a two-point conversion and the win, but the conversion failed and Northwestern pulled out the victory. The decision to gamble and go for two-points and the win instead of one-point and the next overtime period drew criticism for Brewster; as Northwestern defense appeared unable to stop the Minnesota offense.

The Gophers finished with 580 total yards while Northwestern had 589; they combined for 169 plays. Gopher quarterback Adam Weber finished with 25 of 38 passes for 341 yards and five touchdowns, with two interceptions, while also rushing for 89 yards and one touchdown on 13 carries; his total yards and 5 TD passes were the second most in school history. Receiver Ernie Wheelwright had a career best seven catches for 116 yards and three touchdowns. Jay Thomas rushed for 100 yards on 22 carries.

=== North Dakota State ===
	1	2	3	4	Total
(I-AA) Bison	14	3	0	10	27
Gophers	7	7	7	0	21

The North Dakota State Bison of the Football Championship Subdivision (formerly Division I-AA), led by head coach Craig Bohl, visited the Gophers for the second year in a row after nearly upsetting them in a 10–9 decision the previous season. NDSU entered the game ranked No. 1 in I-AA (but ineligible for the playoffs due to its transition period from Division II) and undefeated at 5–0, including a 44–14 win over FBS (D-IA) Central Michigan. The Bison were previously 0-6 all-time against the Gophers. Coach Tim Brewster stated in the week before the game that he did not see the recruiting value in the Gophers playing the match-up, and referred to the Bison as "the little guys in green."

The Bison defeated the Gophers 27–21 in front of 63,088, the most people to attend a Gopher game to that point in the season. The Gophers were dominated in every facet of the game, by a team with 22 fewer scholarship players and none with scholarship offers by Minnesota. The game was considered a low point for the program as a whole. NDSU rushed for 394 yards and totaled 585 yards with an edge in time of possession of nearly 14 minutes. Bison running back Tyler Roehl had a school-record 263 yards on 22 carries with one touchdown. The defeat put the Gophers at 1–7 and official out of contention for a bowl game bid. The victory extended NDSU's winning streak to 11-games, then the longest in all of Division I football.

Approximately 30,000 of those in attendance were NDSU fans. In addition, the North Dakota State received $300,000 from the University of Minnesota for appearing in the game.

=== Michigan ===
	1	2	3	4	Total
Gophers	3	7	0	0	10
#19 Wolverines	0	13	7	14	34

In the battle for the Little Brown Jug, the Gophers held Michigan scoreless in the first quarter while building a 10–0 lead twelve seconds into the second quarter after a 46-yard fumble return for a touchdown by senior safety Dominique Barber. That would be the last time the Gophers would score however, and Michigan responded by reeling off 34 unanswered points to win the game 34–10. Ryan Mallett had 233 yards passing for Michigan. 162 of those yards went to Mario Manningham, who also hauled in a touchdown pass. The Wolverine running back duo of Carlos Brown and Brandon Minor combined for 289 yards on the ground. Duane Bennett had 106 yards rushing for the Gophers while Adam Weber was limited to just 99 yards through the air. Minnesota was just 2 of 13 in converting third down opportunities.

=== Illinois ===
	1	2	3	4	Total
Fighting Illini	14	20	3	7	44
Gophers	0	10	0	7	17

Illinois found success on offense early and often in defeating Minnesota in their homecoming game, 44–10. The Illini led 14–0 after the first quarter, and expanded their lead to 34–10 at halftime. The Illini rolled up 655 yards of total offense, which included a season high 448 yards rushing. Rashard Mendenhall led the Illini attack with 201 yards on the ground, with quarterback Juice Williams adding 133 yards. Ernie Wheelwright led the Gopher attack with 9 catches for 133 yards and one touchdown.

=== Iowa ===
	1	2	3	4	Total
Gophers	0	10	0	6	16
Hawkeyes	14	7	0	0	21

The Hawkeyes won a defensive battle, claiming the Floyd of Rosedale and dropping Minnesota to 0–7 in the Big Ten. Albert Young rushed for 92 yards and two touchdowns to lead the Hawkeyes, while Jake Christensen threw a TD pass to Brandon Myers for the other score. Eric Decker caught a 22-yard touchdown pass from Adam Weber with 1:38 left in the fourth quarter to make the game close, but the two-point conversion failed and Iowa ran out the clock for the victory.

=== Wisconsin ===
	1	2	3	4	Total
Badgers	3	7	10	21	41
Golden Gophers	3	10	7	14	34

The Wisconsin Badgers won the battle for Paul Bunyan's Axe in a game featuring a lot of offense. Minnesota led the game 13–10 at halftime, but after the break Wisconsin outscored Minnesota 31–21 to win the game by 7. Freshman David Gilreath had two punt returns for 106 yards to spark Wisconsin. Running back Zach Brown led the Badger attack on the ground, rushing for 250 yards and two touchdowns. Led by Adam Weber's 352 yards passing and 87 yards rushing, Minnesota rolled up 501 ones yards in total offense in defeat. The loss completed Minnesota's first winless Big Ten campaign since 1983.

== Roster ==
Quarterbacks: 4 Clint Brewster – freshman; 8 Adam Weber – (redshirt) freshman; 11 Mike Frankberg – senior; 13 Ben Gaither – freshman; 17 Tony Mortenson – junior; 19 Mike Maciejowski – junior; Running backs: 5 R.J. Buckner – (redshirt) freshman; 22 Duane Bennett – freshman; 25 Jay Thomas – sophomore; 28 Damola Ogundipe – (redshirt) freshman; 29 Amir Pinnix – senior; 34 Tyler Johnson – sophomore; Fullbacks: 18 Justin Valentine – senior; Wide receivers: 1 Ernie Wheelwright – senior; 6 Tray Herndon – freshman; 7 Eric Decker – sophomore; 11 Michael Kasten – junior; 14 Damien White – freshman; 30 Marcus Sherels – sophomore; 38 Andy Metz – (redshirt) freshman; 81 Ralph Spry – freshman; 82 Marc Cheatham – junior; 84 Jimmy Thompson – freshman; 87 Kyle Moore – freshman; Tight ends: 48 Nick Tow-Arnett – sophomore; 80 Jack Simmons – junior; 86 Troy Reilly – sophomore; 88 Collin McGarry – freshman; 96 Curtis Hughes – (redshirt) freshman	Centers: 53 D.J. Burris – (redshirt) freshman; 77 Tony Brinkhaus – senior; Offensive guards: 52 Jeff Tow-Arnett – sophomore; 65 Jimmy Snyder – (redshirt) freshman; 66 Nedward Tavale – sophomore; 67 Nick Weber – junior; 69 John Jakel – senior; 74 Ryan Ruckdashel – sophomore; Offensive tackles: 62 Erik Kottom – freshman; 63 Andy Brinkhaus – (redshirt) freshman; 64 Steve Shidell – senior; 73 Jason Meinke – sophomore; 76 Dominic Alford – (redshirt) freshman; 79 Matt DeGeest – junior; Offensive line: 60 Ryan Wynn – freshman; 61 Trey Davis – freshman; 68 Chris Bunders – freshman; 71 Chris Mensen – sophomore; 78 Ryan Orton – freshman; Defensive tackles: 51 Eric Small – sophomore; 55 Tony Strouth – freshman; 57 Steve Herold – freshman; 70 Todd Meisel – senior; 75 Otis Hudson – sophomore; 79 Barrett Moen – sophomore; 90 Eric Clark – senior; 96 Matt Stommes – sophomore; 98 Neel Allen – senior; 99 Garrett Brown – sophomore	Defensive ends: 30 Lee Campbell – sophomore; 83 Joey Hiben – sophomore; 90 Raymond Henderson – sophomore; 91 William Van DeSteeg – junior; 93 Derrick Onwuachi – sophomore; 95 William Brody – junior; 97 Anthony Jacobs – freshman; Linebackers: 16 John Carlson – junior; 28 Kevin Mannion – junior; 32 Nathan Triplett – sophomore; 34 Andre Tate' – freshman; 35 Jon Hoese – freshman; 42 Logan U'u – junior; 44 Deon Hightower – junior; 45 Thomas Hennessey – sophomore; 46 John Shevlin – senior; 56 Steve Davis – junior; 58 Mike Sherels – senior; 59 Steve Moore – junior; 94 Willie Dyson – sophomore; Cornerbacks: 11 Desi Steib – senior; 21 Daron Love – (redshirt) freshman; Strong safeties: 9 Curtis Thomas – freshman; 26 Duran Cooley – senior; Free safeties: 15 Jamal Harris – senior; 17 T.J. Wentzel – sophomore; 23 Dominique Barber – senior; 49 Scott Jilek – sophomore	Defensive backs: 2 Ryan Collado – freshman; 13 Michael McKelton – sophomore; 27 Kyle Theret – freshman; 40 Shane Potter – freshman; 48 Bryan Klitzke – freshman; Punters: 38 Blake Haudan – sophomore; 41 Justin Kucek – junior; Kickers: 31 Jason Giannini – junior; 36 Joel Monroe – junior; 37 Eric Ellestad – (redshirt) freshman; Long snappers: 43 Robert McGarry – senior; 47 Ryan Coleman – (redshirt) freshman; Athletes: 3 Harold Howell – freshman; 20 Justin Chatman – freshman

== Awards and honors ==
=== All-Big Ten ===
- Dominique barber – 2nd Team All-Big Ten (Coaches & Media)
- Justin kucek – 2nd Team All-Big Ten (Media)

=== Team awards ===
Bronko Nagurski Award (Team Most Valuable Player)

- Dominique Barber

Bruce Smith Award (Outstanding Offensive Player)

- Eric Decker

Carl Eller Award (Outstanding Defensive Player)

- Dominique Barber

Bobby Bell Award (Outstanding Special Teams Player)

- Justin Kucek
- Nathan Triplett

Butch Nash Award (Competitive on the field and in the classroom)

- John Shevlin (Defense)
- Steve Shidell (Offense)

Paul Giel Award (Unselfishness and most concern about the U of M)

- Todd Meisel (Defense)
- Tony Brinkhaus (Offense)

Neil Fredenburg Award (Courage and Love of the Game)

- Mike Sherels (Defense)
- Justin Valentine (Offense)

Outstanding First Year Player

- Kyle Theret (Defense)
- Adam Weber (Offense)

Outstanding Scout Team Players

- Kyle Moore (Offense)
- Andre Tate’ (Defense)

Coaches Award for Career Achievement

- Ernie Wheelwright

Tony Dungy Character and Community Service Award

- Amir Pinnix Sr.
