= 2007 Illinois Fighting Illini football team =

American college football season

2007 Illinois Fighting Illini football

Rose Bowl, L 17–49 vs. USC
- Conference: Big Ten Conference

Ranking
- Coaches: No. 18
- AP: No. 20
- Record: 9–4 (6–2 Big Ten)
- Head coach: Ron Zook (3rd season)
- Offensive coordinator: Mike Locksley (3rd season)
- Offensive scheme: Spread option
- Co-defensive coordinators: Dan Disch (1st season); Curt Mallory (1st season)
- Base defense: 4–3
- Captains: J Leman; Rashard Mendenhall; Kevin Mitchell; Martin O'Donnell
- Home stadium: Memorial Stadium

2007 Big Ten Conference football standings
	Conf.			Overall
Team	W		L	W		L
No. 5 Ohio State $	7	–	1	11	–	2
No. 18 Michigan	6	–	2	9	–	4
No. 20 Illinois %	6	–	2	9	–	4
No. 24 Wisconsin	5	–	3	9	–	4
Penn State	4	–	4	9	–	4
Iowa	4	–	4	6	–	6
Purdue	3	–	5	8	–	5
Indiana	3	–	5	7	–	6
Michigan State	3	–	5	7	–	6
Northwestern	3	–	5	6	–	6
Minnesota	0	–	8	1	–	11
$ – BCS representative as conference champion; % – BCS at-large representative; Rankings from AP Poll

The 2007 Illinois Fighting Illini football team was an American football team that represented the University of Illinois at Urbana–Champaign as a member of the Big Ten Conference during the 2007 NCAA Division I FBS football season. In their third season under head coach Ron Zook, the Illini compiled a 9–4 record (6–2 in conference games), tied for second place in the Big Ten, and outscored opponents by a total of 362 to 283. On November 10, the Fighting Illini upset the then No. 1 ranked Ohio State Buckeyes at Ohio Stadium in Columbus, Ohio. The Illini concluded the season representing the Big Ten in the 2008 Rose Bowl, where they lost to USC by a 49–17 score. The Illini were ranked No. 13 in the AP poll at the end of the regular season but dropped to No. 20 after losing the Rose Bowl. It was Illinois' first winning season since 2001.

Running back Rashard Mendenhall tallied 1,681 rushing yards on 262 carries (6.4 yards per carry), caught 34 passes for 318 yards, and scored 19 touchdowns. He won the Chicago Tribune Silver Football as the most valuable player in the Big Ten. The team's other statistical leaders included quarterback Juice Williams (1,743 passing yards) and wide receiver Arrelious Benn (54 receptions, 676 receiving yards). Senior linebacker Jeremy Leman was a consensus first-team pick on the 2007 All-America team.

The team played its home games at Memorial Stadium in Champaign, Illinois.

== Schedule ==
Date	Time	Opponent	Rank	Site	TV	Result	Attendance
September 1	2:30 pm	vs. Missouri*		Edward Jones Dome; St. Louis, MO (Arch Rivalry)	ESPN2	L 34–40	62,352
September 8	6:00 pm	No. 24 (FCS) Western Illinois*		Memorial Stadium; Champaign, IL	BTN	W 21–0	48,301
September 15	11:00 am	at Syracuse*		Carrier Dome; Syracuse, NY	ESPNU	W 41–20	34,188
September 22	11:00 am	at Indiana		Memorial Stadium; Bloomington, IN (rivalry)	BTN	W 27–14	34,707
September 29	11:00 am	No. 21 Penn State		Memorial Stadium; Champaign, IL	BTN	W 27–20	57,078
October 6	11:00 am	No. 5 Wisconsin		Memorial Stadium; Champaign, IL	ESPN	W 31–26	57,078
October 13	11:00 am	at Iowa	No. 18	Kinnick Stadium; Iowa City, IA	ESPN2	L 6–10	70,585
October 20	7:00 pm	No. 24 Michigan		Memorial Stadium; Champaign, IL (rivalry)	ABC	L 17–27	57,078
October 27	11:00 am	Ball State*^{†}		Memorial Stadium; Champaign, IL	BTN	W 28–17	55,578
November 3	7:00 pm	at Minnesota		Hubert H. Humphrey Metrodome; Minneapolis, MN	BTN	W 44–17	46,604
November 10	2:30 pm	at No. 1 Ohio State		Ohio Stadium; Columbus, OH (Illibuck Trophy)	ABC	W 28–21	105,453
November 17	11:00 am	Northwestern	No. 20	Memorial Stadium; Champaign, IL (Sweet Sioux Tomahawk)	ESPN	W 41–22	54,516
January 1	3:30 pm	vs. No. 6 USC*	No. 13	Rose Bowl; Pasadena, CA (Rose Bowl) (College GameDay)	ABC	L 17–49	93,923
*Non-conference game; ^{†}Homecoming; Rankings from AP Poll released prior to the game; All times are in Central time

== Rankings ==
Ranking movements Legend: ██ Increase in ranking ██ Decrease in ranking — = Not ranked RV = Received votes
	Week															
Poll	Pre	1	2	3	4	5	6	7	8	9	10	11	12	13	14	Final
AP	—	—	—	—	—	RV	18	RV	—	RV	RV	20	18	15	13	20
Coaches Poll	—	—	—	—	—	RV	19	RV	RV	RV	RV	21	18	14	13	18
Harris	Not released				RV	RV	19	RV	RV	RV	RV	20	18	14	13	Not released
BCS	Not released							—	—	—	—	19	17	15	13	Not released

== Game summaries ==
=== Vs. Missouri ===
	1	2	3	4	Total
Tigers	7	16	14	3	40
Fighting Illini	6	0	21	7	34

The Illini scored first off a Vontae Davis blocked-punt return. Quarterback Juice Williams looked sharp in the first quarter before leaving due to injury in the second. Mizzou jumped out to a 37–13 lead late in the third quarter, before backup quarterback Eddie McGee led the Illini to 21 straight points. A late fourth-quarter interception sealed the game for the Tigers. McGee ended the day 17–31 for 257 yards with a TD, but lost 2 fumbles and threw 2 interceptions. The loss increased Illinois' losing streak to 8 games.

=== No. 24 (FCS) Western Illinois ===
	1	2	3	4	Total
No. 24 (FCS) Leathernecks	0	0	0	0	0
Fighting Illini	0	7	7	7	21

The Illini returned to Memorial Stadium to face FCS Western Illinois in the home opener. Illinois built upon a 7–0 halftime lead with a Juice Williams touchdown run in the third quarter and a Rashard Mendenhall touchdown run in the fourth. Mendenhall finished the day with 142 yards.

=== At Syracuse ===
	1	2	3	4	Total
Fighting Illini	14	3	17	7	41
Orange	0	0	10	10	20

Illinois looked to secure its first road win at the Carrier Dome. After one quarter, the Illini led 14–0 off a Juice Williams touchdown pass and a Rashard Mendenhall touchdown run. Syracuse got on the board in the third quarter with a field goal, and eventually cut the deficit to 20–10. But big plays hurt the Orange in the second half. Arrelious Benn ran for 23 yards on one play, and one drive later, Rashard Mendenhall ran for 50. He finished the day with 150 rush yards and 3 TD's. 378 of Illinois' total yards came on the ground, and they outgained Syracuse 508–286 overall.

=== At Indiana ===
	1	2	3	4	Total
Fighting Illini	6	14	0	7	27
Hoosiers	0	7	0	7	14

Illinois opened their Big Ten season at Indiana. Two Jason Reda field goals put the Illini on the board before Juice Williams found Michael Hoomanawanui in the endzone. They led 20–7 at the half. After a Rashard Mendenhall touchdown put Illinois up 27–7 in the fourth quarter, Indiana QB Kellen Lewis drove down the field to find James Bailey for a 30-yd touchdown, Lewis' second TD on the day. But with a minute left, Vontae Davis picked off Lewis in the endzone, securing a 27–14 Illinois victory, their first in a Big Ten opener since 1993 and their first in Bloomington since 2001. Mendenhall finished the day with a career-high 214 rush yards. Tracy Porter picked off two Juice Williams passes, and Williams finished a disappointing passing effort 13–28 with a TD.

=== No. 21 Penn State ===
	1	2	3	4	Total
No. 21 Nittany Lions	10	7	3	0	20
Fighting Illini	14	7	3	3	27

The Illini faced ranked opposition for the first time in 2007 when the #19 Nittany Lions came to Memorial Stadium. Penn State scored first with a field goal, but Arrelious Benn returned the ensuing kick-off 90 yards for a touchdown, putting Illinois up 7–3. They did not relinquish the lead. Their defense intercepted Penn State quarterback Anthony Morelli 3 times, and allowed the Nittany Lions to score only 3 times out of 6 red zone possessions. A Kevin Mitchell interception with 9 seconds on the clock ended Penn State's comeback hopes. Illinois' victory marked their first over a ranked opponent since the 2001 season and gives the Illini a 4-game win streak, also their longest since 2001.

=== No. 5 Wisconsin ===
	1	2	3	4	Total
No. 5 Badgers	0	6	13	7	26
Fighting Illini	7	10	7	7	31

Going into the game, the unranked Fighting Illini were actually favored by oddsmakers to beat the #5 Badgers, who entered the game undefeated but having had numerous close games against unranked opponents, including a close game against The Citadel. The Illini won in a game not as close as the score.

=== At Iowa ===
	1	2	3	4	Total
No. 18 Fighting Illini	3	0	3	0	6
Hawkeyes	0	3	7	0	10

The #18 Fighting Illini suffered their first Big Ten loss of the season at Kinnick Stadium. In the fourth quarter, trailing 10–6, Eddie McGee appeared to complete an 82-yard pass for a touchdown, but an ineligible receiver downfield penalty negated the would-be go-ahead score. With two minutes left, Eddie McGee drove the Illini to the Iowa 11-yard line, but threw an interception to seal the win for the Hawkeyes.

=== No. 24 Michigan ===
	1	2	3	4	Total
No. 24 Wolverines	3	14	0	10	27
Fighting Illini	7	7	3	0	17

Illinois fumbled a punt late in the fourth quarter and ultimately lost the game.

=== Ball State ===
	1	2	3	4	Total
Cardinals	0	3	14	0	17
Fighting Illini	0	7	14	7	28

=== At Minnesota ===
	1	2	3	4	Total
Fighting Illini	14	20	3	7	44
Golden Gophers	0	10	0	7	17

=== At No. 1 Ohio State ===
	1	2	3	4	Total
Fighting Illini	14	7	7	0	28
No. 1 Buckeyes	14	0	7	0	21

With their win over the Buckeyes, the Illini defeated a No. 1 ranked team for the first time since 1956, and for the first time ever on the road. Juice Williams completed 12 out of 22 passes for only 140 yards, but four receptions were caught for touchdowns. With the win, the Illini damaged the Buckeyes' national title hopes, though Ohio State eventually reached the national championship game due to insufficient winning by other teams. The Illibuck was returned to Champaign in 2008. This was arguably one of the greatest victories in the history of Illinois football. As of 2018, this is the last time Illinois has beaten Ohio State, as the Buckeyes have won the last 9 games in the series, including the last 4 in Columbus.

=== Northwestern ===
	1	2	3	4	Total
Wildcats	0	7	7	8	22
No. 20 Fighting Illini	14	7	14	6	41

Coming off the Ohio State upset, the Illini faced the Northwestern Wildcats. After jumping out to a 14–0 lead, the Illini played redshirt freshmen for the remainder of the game cruising to a 44–22 victory.

=== Vs. No. 6 USC (Rose Bowl) ===
	1	2	3	4	Total
No. 13 Fighting Illini	0	3	7	7	17
No. 6 Trojans	14	7	14	14	49

The Illini ended the 2007 season by participating in the 2008 Rose Bowl, held on New Year's Day in the Rose Bowl stadium in Pasadena, California. Although it traditionally hosts the champions of the Big Ten and Pac-10 conferences, the 2007 Big Ten Champion, Ohio State, was ranked #1 in the final BCS poll and instead participated in the 2008 BCS National Championship Game. The rules governing BCS bowl selections allowed the Rose Bowl to select a BCS "at-large" team from the top fourteen teams ranked in the BCS Standings that have at least nine wins. Keeping with its traditional bowl ties, the Rose Bowl selected #13-ranked Illinois Fighting Illini (9–3), under third-year head coach Ron Zook.

The Illini entered the Rose Bowl after a Cinderella season where they won nine games, including an upset victory over at-the-time #1 Ohio State, after winning a total of four games the previous two seasons. It was Illinois' first bowl game since winning the 2001 Big Ten Championship and playing in the 2002 Sugar Bowl. The Illini offense was led by sophomore quarterback "Juice" Williams, who in the regular season passed for 13 touchdowns and ran for seven, junior running back Rashard Mendenhall, who averaged 127 yards rushing per game and scored 18 touchdowns, and freshman receiver Arrelious Benn, who caught 49 passes and had 158 yards in 32 carries. For taking Illinois to the Rose Bowl a year after going 2–10, Zook won both national and Big Ten coach of the year honors. The Illini entered the game 13.5-point underdogs, the biggest of any of the season's 32 bowl games.

The Trojans defeated the Illini 49–17 before a sold out Rose Bowl crowd.

== Roster ==
(as of 8/30/2007)
Quarterbacks: 14 Ryan Baise – freshman; 12 Billy Garza – junior; 19 Phil Haig – freshman; 10 Eddie McGee – freshman; 7 Isiah Williams – sophomore; Running backs: 22 Daniel Dufrene – sophomore; 36 Maurice Haney – junior; 5 Rashard Mendenhall – junior; 34 Walter Mendenhall – junior; 49 Tyler Pacha – junior; 29 Troy Pollard – freshman; 30 Rahkeem Smith – sophomore; 41 Russ Weil – senior; Wide receivers: 18 Kevin Bailey – freshman; 9 Arrelious Benn – freshman; 17 Jeff Cumberland – sophomore; 23 Jack Eastman – sophomore; 21 Kyle Hudson – junior; 6 Chris James – sophomore; 82 Frank Lenti Jr. – senior; 86 Greg McClendon – junior; 11 Joe Morgan – sophomore; 8 DaJuan Warren – senior; 3 Marques Wilkins – sophomore; 83 Jacob Willis – senior; Tight ends: 16 Michael Hoomanawanui – sophomore; 85 C.J. Jackson – sophomore; 87 John Stock – freshman; 89 Tom Sullivan – sophomore; Offensive line: 52 Jon Asamoah – sophomore; 63 Will Bergen – sophomore; 62 Eric Block – junior	73 Jack Cornell – freshman; 68 Xavier Fulton – junior; 57 Mike Garrity – freshman; 66 Randall Hunt – freshman; 75 Mark Jackson – freshman; 74 Brandon Jordan – freshman; 39 Tad Keely – freshman; 49 Kyle Knezetic – senior; 61 Cole Knuth – freshman; 60 Ryan McDonald – junior; 69 Akim Millington – senior; 58 Dan Motuliak – junior; 76 Charles Myles – senior; 65 Mike Nabolotny – junior; 64 Martin O'Donnell – senior; 78 Ryan Palmer – freshman; 79 Craig Wilson – freshman; Defensive line: 98 Daryle Ballew – freshman; 92 Josh Brent – freshman; 99 Jerry Brown – freshman; 81 Will Davis – junior; 90 Antonio James – sophomore; 94 David Lindquist – junior; 93 D'Angelo McCray – freshman; 96 Chris Norwell – senior; 97 Clay Nurse – freshman; 95 Doug Pilcher – sophomore; 91 Derek Walker – junior; 76 Mike Ware – senior; 58 Bryson Whalen – sophomore; 56 Sirod Williams – junior; Linebackers: 43 Sam Carson III – junior; 39 Conor Gillen – sophomore; 55 Anterio Jackson – freshman; 53 Dustin Jefferson – freshman	47 J Leman – senior; 44 Brit Miller – junior; 45 Rodney Pittman – junior; 48 Erique Roberts – freshman; 40 Antonio Steele – senior; 38 Ian Thomas – freshman; 51 Anthony Thornhill – senior; 2 Martez Wilson – freshman; Defensive backs: 31 Travon Bellamy – sophomore; 18 Nate Bussey – freshman; 1 Vontae Davis – sophomore; 15 Chris Duvalt – sophomore; 20 Garrett Edwards – freshman; 24 Bo Flowers – freshman; 26 Brian Gamble – freshman; 27 Antonio Gully – freshman; 32 Justin Harrison – senior; 28 Dere Hicks – sophomore; 13 Will Judson – junior; 30 Mike Locksley Jr. – freshman; 23 Drew McMahon – senior; 22 Drew Harweger − Sophomore; 42 Kevin Mitchell – senior; 33 Mike Mucha – sophomore; 19 Tony Petruzzello – freshman; 35 Darius Purcell – freshman; 46 Tyler Rouse – junior; 25 Justin Sanders – senior; 14 Marcus Thomas – freshman; Kickers: 36 Jared Bosch – sophomore; 38 Matt Brandabur – freshman; 35 Mike Cklamovski – sophomore; 84 Matt Eller – freshman; 13 Jason Reda – senior; 87 Anthony Santella – freshman; 37 Kyle Yelton – sophomore

== Awards and honors ==
- Rashard Mendenhall (Running back)
  - Chicago Tribune Silver Football
  - All-American, (running back)
- Martin O'Donnell (Offensive Guard)
  - All-American, (offensive guard)
- Jeremy Leman (Linebacker)
  - All-American, (linebacker)

Four Illinois players received first-team honors on the 2007 All-Big Ten Conference football team: Mendenhall at running back (Coaches-1, Media-1); guard Martin O'Donnell (Coaches-1, Media-1); linebacker Jeremy Leman (Coaches-1, Media-1); and defensive back Vontae Davis (Coaches-1, Media-2).
