= 2007 Northwestern Wildcats football team =

American college football season

2007 Northwestern Wildcats football
- Conference: Big Ten Conference
- Record: 6–6 (3–5 Big Ten)
- Head coach: Pat Fitzgerald (2nd season)
- Offensive coordinator: Garrick McGee (2nd season)
- Offensive scheme: Multiple
- Defensive coordinator: Greg Colby (6th season)
- Base defense: 4–3
- Captains: Tonjua Jones; Adam Kadela; Reggie McPherson; Trevor Rees
- Home stadium: Ryan Field

2007 Big Ten Conference football standings
	Conf.			Overall
Team	W		L	W		L
No. 5 Ohio State $	7	–	1	11	–	2
No. 18 Michigan	6	–	2	9	–	4
No. 20 Illinois %	6	–	2	9	–	4
No. 24 Wisconsin	5	–	3	9	–	4
Penn State	4	–	4	9	–	4
Iowa	4	–	4	6	–	6
Purdue	3	–	5	8	–	5
Indiana	3	–	5	7	–	6
Michigan State	3	–	5	7	–	6
Northwestern	3	–	5	6	–	6
Minnesota	0	–	8	1	–	11
$ – BCS representative as conference champion; % – BCS at-large representative; Rankings from AP Poll

The 2007 Northwestern Wildcats football team represented Northwestern University in the Big Ten Conference during the 2007 NCAA Division I FBS football season. Pat Fitzgerald, in his second season at Northwestern, was the team's head coach. The Wildcats played their homes games at Ryan Field in Evanston, Illinois.

Before the beginning of the 2007 season, Northwestern showed potential for improvement upon the previous year's record. ESPN.com's Mark Schlabach stated that Northwestern has the seventh easiest schedule in college football, and SI.com's Steve Megargee claimed that Indiana was the only Big Ten school with an easier schedule. Running back Tyrell Sutton was one of 64 players in college football to be put on the Maxwell Award watch list for the nation's best college football player.

The Wildcats began the season with their first shutout since 1997 in a 27–0 win against the Northeastern Huskies. On October 7, quarterback C. J. Bachér broke Brett Basanez's school record for single-game passing yards by throwing for 520 yards in a victory over Michigan State. Bachér went on to be named the Walter Camp National Offensive Player of the Week and the Big Ten Conference Offensive Player of the Week. Another strong performance in a win against Minnesota earned Bachér Big Ten Conference Offensive Player of the Week honors for the second week in a row.

== Schedule ==
Date	Time	Opponent	Site	TV	Result	Attendance
September 1	11:00 am	Northeastern*	Ryan Field; Evanston, IL	BTN	W 27–0	16,199
September 8	11:00 am	Nevada*	Ryan Field; Evanston, IL	BTN	W 36–31	17,653
September 15	7:00 pm	Duke*	Ryan Field; Evanston, IL	BTN	L 14–20	23,716
September 22	2:30 pm	at No. 8 Ohio State	Ohio Stadium; Columbus, OH	ABC/ESPN	L 7–58	105,178
September 29	11:00 am	Michigan	Ryan Field; Evanston, IL (rivalry)	BTN	L 16–28	40,604
October 6	11:00 am	at Michigan State	Spartan Stadium; East Lansing, MI	BTN	W 48–41 ^{OT}	67,378
October 13	11:00 am	Minnesota	Ryan Field; Evanston, IL	BTN	W 49–48 ^{2OT}	23,314
October 19	6:00 pm	at Eastern Michigan*	Ford Field; Detroit, MI	ESPNU	W 26–14	10,000
October 27	11:00 am	at Purdue	Ross–Ade Stadium; West Lafayette, IN	BTN	L 17–35	58,237
November 3	11:00 am	Iowa	Ryan Field; Evanston, IL	ESPN2	L 17–28	30,173
November 10	11:00 am	Indiana	Ryan Field; Evanston, IL	ESPNC	W 31–28	20,466
November 17	11:00 am	at No. 20 Illinois	Memorial Stadium; Champaign, IL (Sweet Sioux Tomahawk)	ESPN	L 22–41	54,116
*Non-conference game; Rankings from AP Poll released prior to the game; All times are in Central time
