= Seth Wallace =

American football coach (born 1979)

Current position
- Title: Assistant head coach
- Team: Iowa
- Conference: Big Ten

Biographical details
- Born: January 8, 1979 (age 47); Danville, Kentucky, U.S.
- Education: Coe College

Playing career
- 1997–2000: Coe
- Position: Wide receiver

Coaching career (HC unless noted)
- 2001–2002: Coe (ST/WR/TE)
- 2003: Lake Forest (ST/DB)
- 2004–2005: Lake Forest (OC/ST)
- 2006–2008: Iowa (GA)
- 2009–2012: Valdosta State (DBs)
- 2013: Valdosta State (DL)
- 2011–2013: Valdosta State (DC)
- 2014: Iowa (assistant DL)
- 2015: Iowa (CB)
- 2016: Iowa (LB)
- 2017–2023: Iowa (assistant DC/LB)
- 2024–present: Iowa (AHC/ADC/LBs)

Accomplishments and honors

Championships
- NCAA Division II National Champion (2012)

Seth Wallace (born January 8, 1979) is an American college football coach. He is the assistant head coach for the University of Iowa. He played college football at Coe College as a wide receiver.

== Playing career ==
Wallace grew up on the Centre College, Danville, Kentucky campus where his father was associate dean of students, assistant football coach (offensive coordinator and recruiting coordinator) and head baseball coach, and also Grinnell, Iowa, where his father was head football coach and later director of athletics at Grinnell College He played wide receiver at Grinnell High School. Wallace attended Coe College in Cedar Rapids, Iowa, playing football and earning a bachelor's degree in physical education. Wallace was a team captain and twice earned all-conference honors as a wide receiver while leading the nation in punt returns in 1997.

== Coaching career ==
Wallace began coaching at his alma mater Coe as a wide receivers, tight ends, and special teams coach in 2001 and 2002. Wallace moved to Lake Forest College, coaching for three seasons as defensive backs, special teams coach, and offensive coordinator. Wallace joined Kirk Ferentz's staff at Iowa as graduate assistant from 2006 to 2008, working with Phil Parker and the Iowa defensive backs. Wallace earned his master's degree in sports management from the University of Iowa in 2008.

Wallace joined the Valdosta State football staff, coaching in various defensive roles from 2009 until 2013. Wallace was Blazers' defensive coordinator from 2011 to 2013, working under head coach David Dean.

Wallace returned to Iowa in 2014, working in various defensive and recruiting roles before settling in as the Hawkeyes linebackers coach after Jim Reid joined Boston College as defensive coordinator. Wallace has coached several future NFL players at linebacker for the Hawkeyes, including Josey Jewell, Nick Niemann, Ben Niemann, Kristian Welch and Jack Campbell. Wallace became assistant defensive coordinator for the Hawkeyes in 2017, working with defensive coordinator Phil Parker. After the conclusion of the 2022 season, Wallace was named the national FootballScoop Linebackers Coach of the Year.

Wallace’s name was brought into the case in April 2022 by the attorneys for eight Black former Hawkeye players who are seeking damages for what they allege was a demeaning and retaliatory culture run by head coach Kirk Ferentz and former strength and conditioning coach Chris Doyle. The lawsuit was initiated in November 2020. Seth Wallace was dismissed with prejudice as a defendant from the racial discrimination federal lawsuit, 10 months after he was added.
