= Greg Robinson (American football coach) =

American football player and coach (1951–2022)

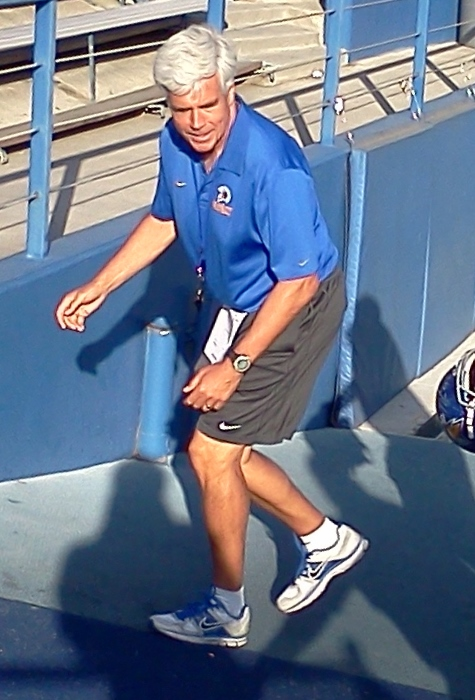
- Robinson after San Jose State's 2014 Spring Game

Biographical details
- Born: October 9, 1951; Los Angeles, California, U.S.
- Died: January 5, 2022 (aged 70); Carpinteria, California, U.S.

Playing career
- 1970–1971: Bakersfield
- 1972–1974: Pacific (CA)
- Positions: Linebacker, center, tight end

Coaching career (HC unless noted)
- 1975–1976: Pacific (CA) (assistant)
- 1977–1979: Cal State Fullerton (assistant)
- 1980–1981: NC State (LB)
- 1982–1988: UCLA (DL)
- 1989: UCLA (OC)
- 1990–1993: New York Jets (DL)
- 1994: New York Jets (DC)
- 1995–2000: Denver Broncos (DC)
- 2001–2003: Kansas City Chiefs (DC)
- 2004: Texas (co-DC)
- 2005–2008: Syracuse
- 2009–2010: Michigan (DC/LB)
- 2012: Saint Francis HS (CA) (assistant)
- 2013: Texas (DC)
- 2014–2015: San Jose State (DC/LB)

Head coaching record
- Overall: 5–37

Accomplishments and honors

Championships
- 2× Super Bowl champion (XXXII, XXXIII)

Gregory McIntosh Robinson (October 9, 1951 – January 5, 2022) was an American college and professional football coach. Robinson served as the head football coach at Syracuse University from 2005 to 2008. He served as an assistant coach with several other college football programs and for three teams in the National Football League (NFL): the New York Jets from 1990 to 1994, the Denver Broncos from 1995 to 2000, and the Kansas City Chiefs from 2001 to 2003. With the Broncos, Robinson was a member of two Super Bowl championship teams. In later years, he served as the defensive coordinator at the University of Texas at Austin, in 2004 and for part of the 2013 season, and at the University of Michigan, from 2009 to 2010.

== Early years and education ==
Robinson graduated from Garces Memorial High School in Bakersfield, California; then attended and played at Bakersfield College, a junior college, before transferring to University of the Pacific.

During his collegiate coaching career, Robinson was an assistant coach at North Carolina State University, Cal State Fullerton, UCLA and his alma mater, University of the Pacific, in addition to his roles at both the University of Texas and Syracuse University.

== Coaching career ==
=== NFL ===
Robinson's tenure as defensive coordinator with the Denver Broncos occurred during their Super Bowl (XXXII & XXXIII) seasons in 1997 and 1998. Robinson's Bronco defense played superbly during the 1998 playoff run. The Broncos defense held the Miami Dolphins scoreless in the divisional playoffs, allowed only a touchdown as a result of a fumble on the one yard line against the New York Jets in the AFC Championship Game, and then allowed a single touchdown to the Atlanta Falcons in the fourth quarter of the Super Bowl after the outcome was secure. In 2001, he was hired by Dick Vermeil to be the defensive coordinator of the Kansas City Chiefs. He would coach the team until the end of the 2003 season. The Chiefs defense struggled under Robinson finishing in the bottom 10 in yards allowed each season and finishing last in 2002.

=== Texas (first stint) ===
In 2004, Robinson was hired to be the co-defensive coordinator at Texas. He coached at Texas for one season.

=== Syracuse ===
Robinson installed a new West Coast offense scheme, replacing the option run style of offense previously run by Pasqualoni, as well as new defensive schemes. Robinson had a 5–37 overall record, and a 2–25 record in the Big East, which is the lowest winning percentage for a non-interim coach in school history. In two of those four years, Syracuse suffered the only double-digit losing seasons in program history. By contrast, Pasqualoni only had one losing season on the field in his entire 14-year career at Syracuse, and only two in his head coaching career (a 2–7 season at Western Connecticut his rookie year). Additionally, after Syracuse vacated all of its wins in 2005 and 2006 due to ineligible players, Robinson also "officially" owns two of Syracuse's only three winless seasons in school history.

In his final press conference as Syracuse coach, after the Orange had concluded a fourth straight losing campaign (3–9), Robinson likened his relentless positivity to the famous children's story The Little Engine That Could, even pausing to read a description of the story directly from its Wikipedia page. Robinson, in the words of one reporter "defiant as always and perhaps in a bit of denial", told the assembled press that in spite of his shortcomings at Syracuse, "I still think I can."

Early in the 2008 campaign, the decline of Syracuse football was the subject of an ESPN College GameDay piece in which Syracuse athletic director Daryl Gross and Syracuse greats Floyd Little and Jim Brown registered their disgust with Robinson. Robinson was fired November 17, 2008, two games before the end of the season. He had one year left on a contract that paid him $1.1 million per season. In 2012, Athlon Sports named Robinson as the sixth worst college football head coach of the last 50 years.

=== Michigan ===
Robinson was hired by Michigan on January 20, 2009, as their defensive coordinator, replacing Scott Shafer. (Coincidentally, Shafer would be hired as Syracuse's defensive coordinator before the 2009 season, and would later succeed Doug Marrone as head coach when Marrone departed before the 2013 season for the NFL to coach the Buffalo Bills.) In 2009, Michigan ranked 82nd of 120 teams in the Football Bowl Subdivision and ninth of 11 teams in the Big Ten Conference in total defense. In 2010, the Wolverines ranked 110th of 120 teams in FBS and 11th of 11 teams in the Big Ten in total defense. Robinson was fired with head coach Rich Rodriguez and the majority of his staff on January 5, 2011.

Robinson served as an assistant coach at Saint Francis High School (La Cañada Flintridge) in 2012. Saint Francis was coached by Jim Bonds who was a quarterback at UCLA when Robinson was an assistant coach.

=== Texas (second stint) ===
Robinson was hired by Texas on July 17, 2013, as a football analyst to "handle quality control evaluation for the team, provide team video review, oversee the Longhorns self-scouting and provide assistance in opponent scouting." Less than two months later, the Longhorns' defense allowed Brigham Young University to rush for a record-setting 550 yards in the second game of the 2013 season. The following day, Texas head coach Mack Brown described the defensive performance as "unacceptable" and removed Manny Diaz from the position of defensive coordinator. Robinson was promoted to take his place.

As defensive coordinator, Robinson was able to turn one of the worst defenses in the Big 12 to one of the best in a shockingly short amount of time, especially considering his 2-year absence from coaching preceded by high-profile failures at Syracuse and Michigan. By the end of the season, Texas led the conference in sacks. The turnaround was clearly evident in the 2013 Alamo Bowl, in which Texas took on the Oregon Ducks and their elite offense. Oregon's offense was #2 in the country and averaged over 45 points scored per game. Robinson's Texas defense held the Oregon offense to one touchdown and 3 field goals for a total of 16 points. No defense gave up fewer points to Oregon in 2013. However, poor offensive play by the Longhorns only yielded one touchdown and allowed Oregon's defense to score two additional touchdowns by returning intercepted passes. Oregon went on to win the game 30–7 despite the excellent performance by Robinson's defensive unit.

Following the end of the 2013 season and the departure of head coach Mack Brown, new head coach Charlie Strong announced that Vance Bedford (Strong's defensive coordinator from his previous job at the University of Louisville and a former star player on the Texas defense) would take over as the defensive coordinator at Texas. Robinson was not announced as part of the new staff.

=== San Jose State ===
Robinson became the San Jose State defensive coordinator for the 2014 and 2015 seasons. On December 18, 2015, San Jose State announced Robinson would be retiring following the Spartans' bowl game.

== Death ==
Robinson died in Carpinteria, California from a form of Alzheimer's disease on January 5, 2022, at the age of 70.

== Head coaching record ==
Year	Team	Overall	Conference	Standing	Bowl/playoffs
Syracuse Orange (Big East Conference) (2005–2008)
2005	Syracuse	0–10 (Note: Due to NCAA sanctions, Syracuse had all wins from the 2005 and 2006 seasons vacated, one from 2005 and four from 2006. Originally, Syracuse was 1–10 (0–8 Big East) in 2005 and 4–8 (1–7 Big East) in 2006.)	0–7	8th	
2006	Syracuse	0–8	0–6	T–7th	
2007	Syracuse	2–10	1–6	8th	
2008	Syracuse	3–9	1–6	T–7th	
Syracuse:		5–37	2–25		
Total:		5–37			
