= Mitch King =

American football player (born 1986)

No. 75
- Position: Defensive end

Personal information
- Born: May 5, 1986 (age 40); Burlington, Iowa, U.S.
- Listed height: 6 ft 1 in (1.85 m)
- Listed weight: 280 lb (127 kg)

Career information
- College: Iowa
- NFL draft: 2009: undrafted

Career history
- Tennessee Titans (2009)*; Indianapolis Colts (2010); St. Louis Rams (2010)*; New Orleans Saints (2010–2011); Houston Texans (2012)*
- * Offseason or practice squad member only

Awards and highlights
- Second-team All-American (2008); Big Ten Defensive Lineman of the Year (2008); 2× First-team All-Big Ten (2007, 2008); Freshman All-American (2005)

Career NFL statistics
- Total tackles: 6
- Stats at Pro Football Reference

Mitch King (born May 5, 1986) is an American former professional football player who was a defensive end in the National Football League (NFL). He played college football for the Iowa Hawkeyes and was signed by the Tennessee Titans as an undrafted free agent in 2009.

== Early life ==
King attended Burlington Community High School in Burlington, Iowa. He was a Class 4A first-team All-State selection as a senior and a member of the SuperPrep all-Region team . He was also named First-team All-Conference as both a linebacker and running back as a senior, and Second-team All-Conference linebacker as a junior. He finished his career with 1,400 rushing yards, including 850 as a senior. He was a two-year letterman in football and swimming, and also lettered in baseball and track.

== College career ==
King was selected to play in the 2009 Senior Bowl after becoming the 60th player in Iowa football history to record over 200 career tackles. He ranks 41st in career tackles with 228 career stops. In 2008, he was named Big Ten Conference Defensive Lineman of the Year, a First-team All-American by ESPN.com, a Second-team All-American by the Walter Camp Football Foundation, the Associated Press and SI.Com, and a Third-team All-American by Rivals.com. He was also a consensus First-team All-Big Ten selection. That season he started all 13 games at defensive tackle, recording 27 solo tackles and 27 assists, including 15.5 tackles for loss and four sacks. In 2007, he was named First-team All-Big Ten, including by Rivals.com. That season he made 58 tackles (25 solo, 14.5 for loss), 4.5 sacks and 7 pass deflections, and forced a fumble. In 2006, King made 56 tackles (21 solo), four of which went for losses. He also made 7 sacks, deflected 4 passes and forced three fumbles. In 2005, he was named to the 2005 First-team Freshman All-America team after totaling 60 tackles (36 solo), 60 11 tackles for loss, two sacks, 3 pass deflections and 3 forced fumbles. In 2004, he redshirted.

== Professional career ==
=== 2009 NFL draft ===
Pre-draft measurables
Height	Weight	Arm length	Hand span	40-yard dash	10-yard split	20-yard split	20-yard shuttle	Three-cone drill	Vertical jump	Broad jump	Bench press
6 ft 1 1/2 in (1.87 m)	280 lb (127 kg)	31 1/2 in (0.80 m)	10 in (0.25 m)	4.92 s	1.73 s	2.86 s	4.58 s	7.60 s	33 1/2 in (0.85 m)	9 ft 1 in (2.77 m)	23 reps
Arm and hand spans from Pro Day, all other values from NFL Combine.

King was projected to be selected in the 5th to 7th round of the 2009 NFL draft, but went undrafted.

=== Tennessee Titans ===
King was signed by the Tennessee Titans as an undrafted free agent in 2009. He chose to go to Tennessee to learn under Kyle Vanden Bosch and defensive line coach Jim Washburn even though he had many offers from other teams. He was waived on September 4, 2009. He was re-signed to the practice squad the next day.

=== Indianapolis Colts ===
King signed a future contract with the Indianapolis Colts on January 23, 2010, after his contract with the Titans expired. He was released by the Colts on October 5, 2010.

=== St. Louis Rams ===
Shortly after his release from the Colts, King was signed to the Rams practice squad. The Rams released him on December 14.

=== New Orleans Saints ===
After being released by the Rams, King was signed to the Saints practice squad. He was re-signed on January 18, 2012. King was waived on June 2, 2012.

=== Houston Texans ===
The Houston Texans signed King on July 30, 2012, and released him in final cuts in August.
