= Kenny Iwebema =

American football player (born 1985)

No. 91
- Position: Defensive end

Personal information
- Born: February 6, 1985 (age 41); Minneapolis, Minnesota, U.S.
- Listed height: 6 ft 4 in (1.93 m)
- Listed weight: 268 lb (122 kg)

Career information
- High school: Bowie (Arlington, Texas)
- College: Iowa
- NFL draft: 2008: 4th round, 116th overall pick

Career history
- Arizona Cardinals (2008–2010)

Awards and highlights
- First-team All-Big Ten (2005)

Career NFL statistics
- Total tackles: 14
- Sacks: 2
- Stats at Pro Football Reference

Kenneth Ogwugwa Iwebema (born February 6, 1985) is an American former professional football player who was a defensive end in the National Football League (NFL). He was selected by the Arizona Cardinals in the fourth round of the 2008 NFL draft. He played college football for the Iowa Hawkeyes.

== Early life ==
While at Bowie High School in the Dallas suburb of Arlington, Texas, Iwebema collected a total of 89 tackles and 15 sacks. During his senior season, he collected 48 tackles, 10 sacks and 18 tackles for loss as he earned first-team all-conference and honorable mention all-state honors. He was a three-year letterman in football and also earned two letters in track playing discus. He was also named second-team all-conference as a junior and was team captain as a senior.

== College career ==
=== 2004 ===
After redshirting in 2003, Iwebema saw action in all 12 games. However, his playing time was limited as he only recorded three tackles. Two of those were against Minnesota and the other was in the season-opener against Kent State.

=== 2005 ===
2005 was Iwebema's breakout season, as he recorded 47 tackles, seven sacks and 10 tackles for loss. His play was so dominant that he was named first-team all-Big Ten by league media and honorable mention all-Big Ten by league coaches. In the game against Iowa State, he recorded a season-high nine tackles. Three weeks later, against Illinois, he tied an Iowa record with two field goal blocks. Against Wisconsin, Iwebema recorded a season-high in sacks with two as the Hawkeyes became bowl eligible.

=== 2006 ===
Despite being named to numerous pre-season All America teams, Iwebema took a step back in 2006. Injuries plagued him late in the season and he did not see action in the season-opener against Montana due to violating team rules. Against Syracuse, Iwebema recorded a career-high 11 tackles. He also recorded two tackles for loss, two quarterback sacks and a forced fumble as the Hawkeyes won the game in double overtime. In total, he recorded 27 tackles, four sacks and five tackles for loss on the season.

=== College statistics ===
Iowa		Defense
Season	Games	Tackles	T/Loss	Sacks	Forced Fumbles	Pass Breakups
2004	12	3	0	0	0	0
2005	12	47	10	7	1	0
2006	8	27	5	4	1	2
2007	11	28	5	3.5	1	2
Total	43	106	20	14.5	3	4

== Professional career ==
Pre-draft measurables
Height	Weight	Arm length	Hand span	40-yard dash	10-yard split	20-yard split	20-yard shuttle	Three-cone drill	Vertical jump	Broad jump	Bench press
6 ft 4 in (1.93 m)	274 lb (124 kg)	33 1/4 in (0.84 m)	9 in (0.23 m)	4.77 s	1.68 s	2.77 s	4.67 s	7.53 s	35.5 in (0.90 m)	9 ft 8 in (2.95 m)	26 reps
All values from NFL Combine/Pro Day

On April 27, 2008 in the 2008 NFL draft the Arizona Cardinals selected him in the fourth round with the 17th pick (116th overall). After becoming a free agent following the 2010 season, he re-signed with Arizona on August 22, 2011. He was released on September 2.

== Medical scare ==
On April 30, Iwebema had a chest x-ray as part of a normal team physical. The x-ray revealed a shadow that doctors were worried might be an aortic aneurysm. Subsequently, Iwebema had both a CT scan and PET scan done. They found a mass the size of a baseball which had metastasized at an advanced rate since Iwebema's rookie physical which had shown nothing amiss. The tumor was diagnosed as being a non-malignant Teratoma. Iwebema had surgery on May 18 to remove the mass. So as to avoid possibly sidelining him for the upcoming season, a robotic laparoscope was used to remove the mass.
