= Jake Christensen =

American football player (born 1986)

No. 6
- Position: Quarterback

Personal information
- Born: August 15, 1986 (age 40); Lockport, Illinois, U.S.
- Listed height: 6 ft 1 in (1.85 m)
- Listed weight: 215 lb (98 kg)

Career information
- High school: Lockport (IL) Township
- College: Iowa
- NFL draft: 2010: undrafted

Career history
- Dresden Monarchs (2010)

Jake Christensen (born August 15, 1986) is an American former professional football quarterback for the Dresden Monarchs football team in the German Football League (GFL). His father is former National Football League (NFL) veteran Jeff Christensen, who played for the Cincinnati Bengals, Philadelphia Eagles, and Cleveland Browns during his career. Before his playing days at Iowa Hawkeyes, Jake played his high school football at Lockport Township High School.

== Early life ==
As a junior at Lockport Township, Christensen gathered first-team all-area, all-conference, and all-state en route to leading his prep team to their second straight Class 8A state title, the first of the 10 year state title streak. As a senior, Christensen earned first-team all-state and all-conference honors and garnered all-American support from USA Today, SuperPrep, Rivals.com, and Parade Magazine. He was also named Illinois Player of the Year by the Champaign News-Gazette. Christensen played in the 2005 U.S. Army All-American Bowl.

== College career ==
=== 2008 ===
Christensen had started the 2008 season as the starter, completing 17 out of 27 passes for 221 yards, two touchdowns with one interception in his first two starts. He eventually lost the job to sophomore Ricky Stanzi. Christensen finished the year completing 36 out of 63 passes, for 369 yards, two touchdowns, and one interception. The Hawkeyes finished the year with nine wins and four losses, defeating the South Carolina Gamecocks 31-10 in the Outback bowl.

=== Statistics ===
Iowa		Passing
Season	Games	Comp-Att	Yds	Avg	TD	INT
2006	4	23-35	285	8.1	2	2
2007	12	198-370	2,269	6.0	17	6
2008	7	36-63	396	6.3	2	1
Total	23	257-468	2,950	6.8	21	9

== Professional career ==
In 2010, Christensen played for the Dresden Monarchs of the German Football League. In 6 games played, Christensen threw for 1685 yards and 14 passing touchdowns against 9 interceptions.
