= Albert Young (American football) =

American football player and coach (born 1985)

No. 34, 39, 41
- Position: Running back

Personal information
- Born: February 25, 1985 (age 41); Moorestown, New Jersey, U.S.
- Listed height: 5 ft 10 in (1.78 m)
- Listed weight: 209 lb (95 kg)

Career information
- High school: Moorestown
- College: Iowa (2003–2007)
- NFL draft: 2008: undrafted

Career history

Playing
- Minnesota Vikings (2008–2010); Jacksonville Jaguars (2011)*; Pittsburgh Steelers (2011)*
- * Offseason or practice squad member only

Coaching
- Paul VI High School, NJ (2011); Colorado (2012) Assistant running backs coach; Pittsburgh (2013) Assistant strength & conditioning coach; Wilkes (2021) Running backs coach

Awards and highlights
- Second-team All-Big Ten (2005); Led Big Ten in rushing (2005)

Career NFL statistics
- Rushing yards: 82
- Rushing average: 3.3
- Receptions: 2
- Receiving yards: 11
- Stats at Pro Football Reference

Albert Young (born February 25, 1985) is an American former professional football player who was a running back for two seasons with the Minnesota Vikings of the National Football League (NFL). After playing college football for the Iowa Hawkeyes, he was signed by the Vikings as an undrafted free agent in 2008. He played for the Vikings in 2009 and 2010.

== Early life ==
A resident of Moorestown, New Jersey, Young played high school football at Moorestown High School. He remains the all-time leading rusher in South Jersey (5,411 yards) and after originally committing to University of Wisconsin-Madison to play football for Barry Alvarez's Badgers, he decommitted for the Iowa Hawkeyes in 2003.

Albert Young was selected by The Philadelphia Inquirer as the top South Jersey offensive player of the past decade.

== Professional career ==
=== Minnesota Vikings ===
Young was signed to the Minnesota Vikings' practice squad in 2008 and to the active roster prior to the 2009 season. When Chester Taylor left the Vikings to join the Chicago Bears following the 2009 season, Young was promoted to second-string running back. However, during the beginning of 2010 season Young was replaced by Toby Gerhart as the third down back and second-string running back. On December 7, Young was placed on injured reserve. On March 2, 2011, Albert Young was not tendered a contract offer by the Vikings, making him an unrestricted free agent.

=== Jacksonville Jaguars ===
On August 23, 2011, Young signed with the Jacksonville Jaguars.

=== Pittsburgh Steelers ===
On January 4, 2012, Young was signed to the practice squad of the Pittsburgh Steelers.

== Coaching career ==
Young became an assistant coach for the University of Colorado Buffaloes football team in 2012.
