= Rashard Mendenhall =

American football player (born 1987)

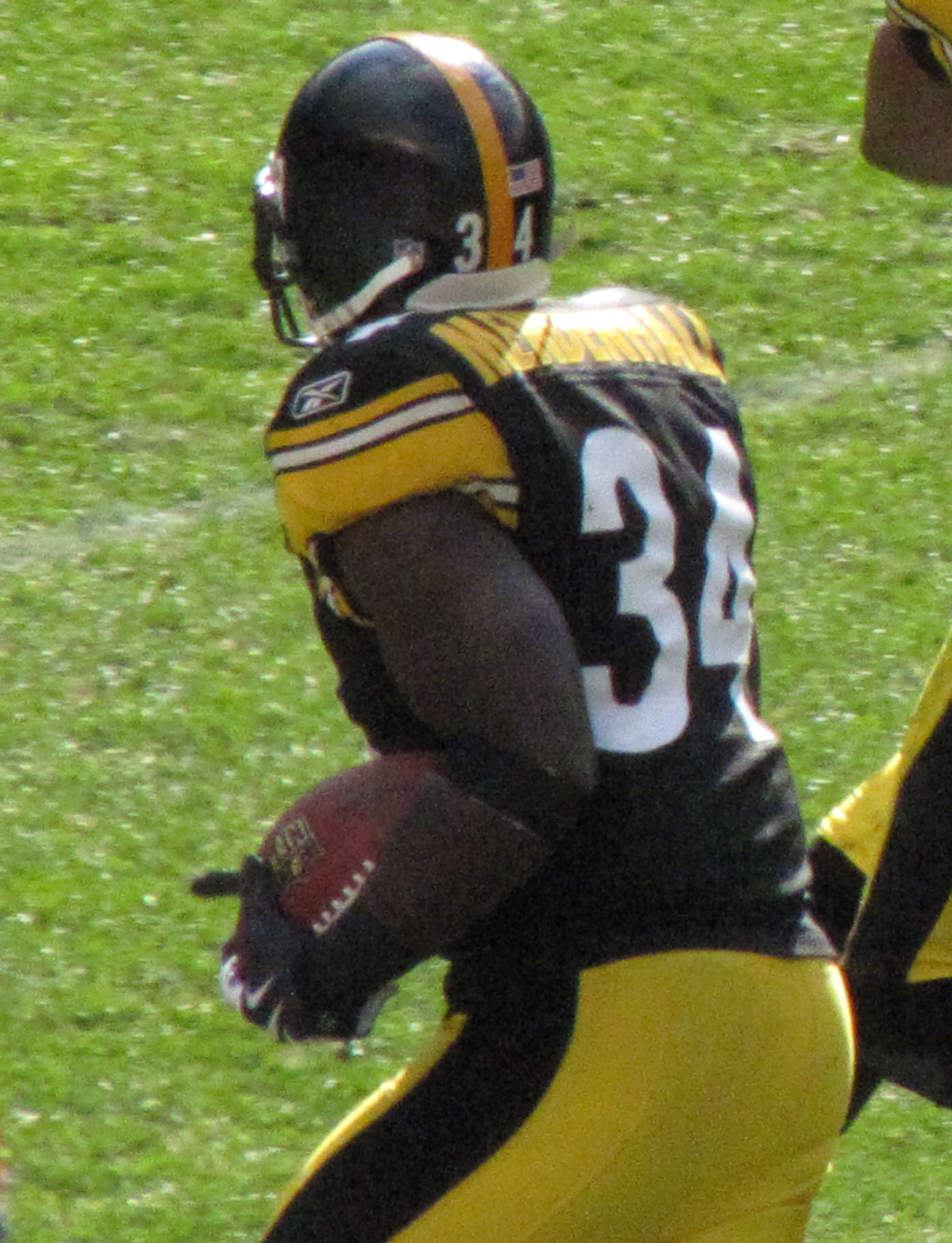
- Mendenhall with the Pittsburgh Steelers in 2009

No. 34, 28
- Position: Running back

Personal information
- Born: June 19, 1987 (age 39); Skokie, Illinois, U.S.
- Listed height: 5 ft 10 in (1.78 m)
- Listed weight: 225 lb (102 kg)

Career information
- High school: Niles West (Skokie)
- College: Illinois (2005–2007)
- NFL draft: 2008: 1st round, 23rd overall pick

Career history
- Pittsburgh Steelers (2008–2012); Arizona Cardinals (2013)

Awards and highlights
- Super Bowl champion (XLIII); Big Ten Most Valuable Player (2007); Big Ten Offensive Player of the Year (2007); First-team All-Big Ten (2007)

Career NFL statistics
- Rushing yards: 4,236
- Rushing average: 3.9
- Rushing touchdowns: 37
- Receptions: 95
- Receiving yards: 795
- Receiving touchdowns: 2
- Stats at Pro Football Reference

Rashard Jamal Mendenhall (born June 19, 1987) is an American former professional football player who was a running back for six seasons in the National Football League (NFL). He played college football for the Illinois Fighting Illini and was selected by the Pittsburgh Steelers in the first round of the 2008 NFL draft. He won Super Bowl XLIII with the Steelers. He also played for the Arizona Cardinals.

After his career, he became a writer for the television series Ballers.

== Early life ==
Mendenhall attended Niles West High School and Lincoln Jr. High School in Skokie, Illinois. As a five-star prospect, he was also rated the best recruit in the state of Illinois by Scout.com. He recorded 1,300 yards and 21 touchdowns as a sophomore. As a junior, he rushed for 1,832 yards and 19 touchdowns, while averaging 11.6 yards per carry. In his last year, he averaged 9.1 yards per carry, rushing for 1,453 yards on 160 attempts and 14 touchdowns. Following his high school career, Mendenhall played in the 2005 U.S. Army All-American Bowl.

On September 22, 2023, Niles West officially retired Mendenhall's #5 jersey from the football program.

== College career ==
Mendenhall played at the University of Illinois Urbana-Champaign. His first season with the Fighting Illini was in 2005, during which he rushed for 218 yards on 48 carries, adding 82 yards receiving and two touchdowns. In 2006, Mendenhall nearly tripled his rushing total, gaining 640 yards and scoring five touchdowns. He added 164 yards receiving and a touchdown, with 12 receptions. Throughout his final season with the Illini, Mendenhall rushed for a then school record 1,681 yards and 17 touchdowns. Throughout the 13 game season, he also had 318 yards receiving and two touchdowns on 34 receptions. He majored in Community Recreation.

Mendenhall was on the cover of Sporting News' High School Football Magazine. On April 24, 2008, Mendenhall made a guest appearance on The Best Damn Sports Show Period in a segment called Best Damn Rookie Hazing, along with former Oklahoma wide receiver Malcolm Kelly.

On May 8, 2023, Mendenhall was named as an inductee into the Illini Hall of Fame.

== Professional career ==
Pre-draft measurables
Height	Weight	Arm length	Hand span	40-yard dash	10-yard split	20-yard split	20-yard shuttle	Vertical jump	Broad jump	Bench press
5 ft 10 1/8 in (1.78 m)	225 lb (102 kg)	31 3/8 in (0.80 m)	10 7/8 in (0.28 m)	4.45 s	1.57 s	2.59 s	4.18 s	33.5 in (0.85 m)	9 ft 9 in (2.97 m)	26 reps
All values from NFL Combine

=== Pittsburgh Steelers ===
Mendenhall was selected in the first round with the 23rd overall pick by the Pittsburgh Steelers in the 2008 NFL draft. Prior to his rookie season Mendenhall was ranked by ESPN as the 30th best running back in the league. On July 25, 2008, Mendenhall agreed to a five-year contract worth $12.55 million with the Steelers, of which $7.125 million was guaranteed. He was expected to be a complement to Pro-Bowl running back Willie Parker, in addition to returning kicks. Mendenhall fumbled twice in Pittsburgh's third pre-season game against Minnesota; they were attributed to adjusting to the faster pace of the NFL. Days after the game, teammate Hines Ward placed a ball in Mendenhall's locker with a note stating, "Take Mendenhall's ball away and get $100 from him." Mendenhall was required to carry the ball everywhere he went until the team's next game. Mendenhall fumbled once more in the Steelers final pre-season game, but worked with running backs coach Kirby Wilson to fix the problem.

Mendenhall entered the 2008 regular season as the Steelers' youngest player. He took on return duties in addition to his running back position. Entering the fourth week of the 2008 season, Willie Parker suffered an injury which allowed Mendenhall to make his first NFL start. Mendenhall rushed for 30 yards on 9 carries, but was forced to leave the game with a fractured shoulder in the third quarter after a hit by Baltimore Ravens linebacker Ray Lewis. Mendenhall was placed on injured reserve for the remainder of the season. Mendenhall finished his rookie season with 58 rushing yards on 19 carries and 115 yards on six kick returns.

In week 4 of the 2009 season, Mendenhall started in place of an injured Willie Parker. Against the San Diego Chargers, he jump-started his NFL career by rushing for 165 yards and two touchdowns.

After a 2009 season where Mendenhall ran for 1,108 yards and 7 touchdowns, his 2010 season proved to be even more impressive. In 2010 Mendenhall ran for 1,273 yards and 13 touchdowns, helping lead the Steelers back to the Super Bowl where they lost Super Bowl XLV against the Green Bay Packers. The loss was aided by a 4th quarter fumble by Mendenhall that led to a Packers scoring drive.

The 2011 season was a difficult season for Mendenhall, who only rushed for over 100 yards two times in 15 games. However, Mendenhall scored 9 touchdowns and had a 4.0 yards per carry average. On January 1, 2012, Mendenhall left the last regular season game against the Cleveland Browns with a knee injury on the final play of the 1st quarter. It was soon discovered that he had torn his ACL and was placed on the IR list. Mendenhall finished the year with 928 yards rushing.

On December 12, 2012, Mendenhall was suspended by the Steelers organization for a game against the Dallas Cowboys for not showing up to a game against the San Diego Chargers because he was deactivated due to inconsistent play.

=== Arizona Cardinals ===
Mendenhall signed a one-year contract worth up to $2.5 million with the Arizona Cardinals on March 13, 2013. Mendenhall would end up scoring eight rushing touchdowns for the Cardinals

=== Retirement ===
In March 2014, at the age of 26, Mendenhall retired from the NFL, saying, "Football was pretty cool, but I don't want to play anymore. I want to travel the world and write!"

On July 25, 2026, Mendenhall was inducted into the Illinois Sports Hall of Fame.

== Career statistics ==
Legend
**Bold**	Career high

=== NFL ===
Year	Team	GP	Rushing					Receiving				
Year	Team	GP	Att	Yds	Avg	Lng	TD	Rec	Yds	Avg	Lng	TD
2008	PIT	4	19	58	3.1	12	0	2	17	8.5	11	0
2009	PIT	16	242	1,108	**4.6**	60	7	**25**	**261**	**10.4**	26	**1**
2010	PIT	16	**324**	**1,273**	3.9	50T	**13**	23	167	7.3	24	0
2011	PIT	15	228	928	4.1	**68**	9	18	154	8.6	**35**	0
2012	PIT	6	51	182	3.6	20	0	9	62	6.9	15	**1**
2013	ARI	15	217	687	3.2	28	8	18	134	7.4	24	0
Career		72	1,081	4,236	3.9	68	37	95	795	8.4	35	2

=== College ===
Year	Team	GP	Rushing					Receiving				
Year	Team	GP	Att	Yds	Avg	Lng	TD	Rec	Yds	Avg	Lng	TD
2005	Illinois	10	48	218	4.5	18	0	13	82	6.3	16	**2**
2006	Illinois	12	78	640	**8.2**	**86**	5	12	164	**13.7**	**76**	1
2007	Illinois	13	**262**	**1,681**	6.4	79	**17**	**34**	**318**	9.4	55	**2**
Career		35	388	2,539	6.5	86	22	59	564	9.6	76	5

== Writing career ==
Mendenhall was a writer and producer for the HBO sports comedy Ballers. A number of scenes from the show were inspired by his own career.

== Controversies ==
Reacting to the death of Osama bin Laden and the American reaction to the death of Osama bin Laden on May 2, 2011, Mendenhall posted comments on his Twitter account criticizing the celebrations; one tweet seemed to support 9/11 conspiracy theories.

On April 11, 2019, during the public fallout between Mendenhall's former teammates Steelers quarterback Ben Roethlisberger and former Steelers wide receiver Antonio Brown, Mendenhall took to Twitter stating that the situation between Roethlisberger and Brown occurred because Roethlisberger is racist. Mendenhall tweeted, "Alright, I'll end the mystery...B's racist and @AB84 (Brown) is black. He had to catch balls from a racist quarterback. Every honest player knows it, it's not a big deal. He was just supposed to take his lickings and move on, like a slave for real." Mendenhall later attempted to back pedal on his remarks, saying that Roethlisberger was "not racist" just like Brown is "not a dirtbag" and "Clearly it's no fun, when EVERYONE's the accused."

On December 18, 2023, Mendenhall posted on X, "I'm sick of average white guys commenting on football. Y'all not even good at football. Can we please replace the Pro Bowl with an All-Black vs. All-White bowl so these cats can stop trying to teach me who’s good at football. I’m better than ur [sic] goat." The post drew widespread mockery and criticism, including from Robert Griffin III, who posted a video in which he said, "This is the tweet of a dumbass. Don't be a dumbass. These are prejudice, discriminatory, racial ideologies which set us back centuries. We don't want to go back to the old times. I don't want to participate in the segregation bowl." Mendenhall followed up on the post five days later, saying "Did not intend to lessen my white football brothers. But honestly, they know that..".
