= 2007 Eastern Michigan Eagles football team =

American college football season

2007 Eastern Michigan Eagles football
- Conference: Mid-American Conference
- West
- Record: 4–8 (3–4 MAC)
- Head coach: Jeff Genyk (4th season)
- Offensive coordinator: Scott Isphording (1st season)
- Home stadium: Rynearson Stadium

2007 Mid-American Conference football standings
	Div			Conf.			Overall
Team	W		L	W		L	W		L
East Division
Miami (OH) xy	4	–	2	5	–	2	6	–	7
Bowling Green x	4	–	2	6	–	2	8	–	5
Buffalo x	4	–	2	5	–	3	5	–	7
Ohio	3	–	3	4	–	4	6	–	6
Temple	3	–	3	4	–	4	4	–	8
Akron	2	–	4	3	–	5	4	–	8
Kent State	1	–	5	1	–	7	3	–	9
West Division
Central Michigan xy$	4	–	1	6	–	1	8	–	6
Ball State x	4	–	1	5	–	2	7	–	6
Eastern Michigan	3	–	2	3	–	4	4	–	8
Western Michigan	2	–	3	3	–	4	5	–	7
Toledo	2	–	3	3	–	5	5	–	7
Northern Illinois	0	–	5	1	–	6	2	–	10
Championship: Central Michigan 35, Miami 10
$ – Conference champion; x – Division champion/co-champions; Due to an unbalanced conference schedule, the team with best division record within each division was awarded that division's championship game berth.

The 2007 Eastern Michigan Eagles football team represented Eastern Michigan University during the 2007 NCAA Division I FBS football season. Eastern Michigan competed as a member of the Mid-American Conference (MAC) West Division. The team was coached by Jeff Genyk and played their homes game in Rynearson Stadium. The Eagles finished the season 4–8, tied with the 2004 and 2005 seasons for the most wins in Genyk's career.

== Schedule ==
Date	Time	Opponent	Site	TV	Result	Attendance	Source
September 1	6:00 pm	at Pittsburgh*	Heinz Field; Pittsburgh, PA		L 3–27	36,183	
September 8	12:00 pm	Ball State	Rynearson Stadium; Ypsilanti, MI	CL	L 16–38	5,794	
September 15	12:00 pm	at Northern Illinois	Huskie Stadium; DeKalb, IL		W 21–19	20,012	
September 22	3:30 pm	Howard*	Rynearson Stadium; Ypsilanti, MI		W 38–15	10,141	
September 29	7:00 pm	at Vanderbilt*	Vanderbilt Stadium; Nashville, TN		L 7–30	37,220	
October 6	12:00 pm	at Michigan*	Michigan Stadium; Ann Arbor, MI	BTN	L 22–33	108,415	
October 13	12:00 pm	at Ohio	Peden Stadium; Athens, OH		L 42–48	17,031	
October 19	7:00 pm	Northwestern*	Ford Field; Detroit, MI	ESPNU	L 14–26	10,000	
October 27	3:30 pm	Western Michigan	Rynearson Stadium; Ypsilanti, MI (Michigan MAC Trophy)	CL	W 19–2	7,002	
November 3	7:00 pm	at Toledo	Glass Bowl; Toledo, OH		L 28–52	17,270	
November 9	7:30 pm	Bowling Green	Rynearson Stadium; Ypsilanti, MI	ESPNU	L 32–39	4,304	
November 16	7:00 pm	at Central Michigan	Kelly/Shorts Stadium; Mount Pleasant, MI (rivalry)		W 48–45	15,822	
*Non-conference game; All times are in Eastern time

== Game summaries ==
=== Pittsburgh ===
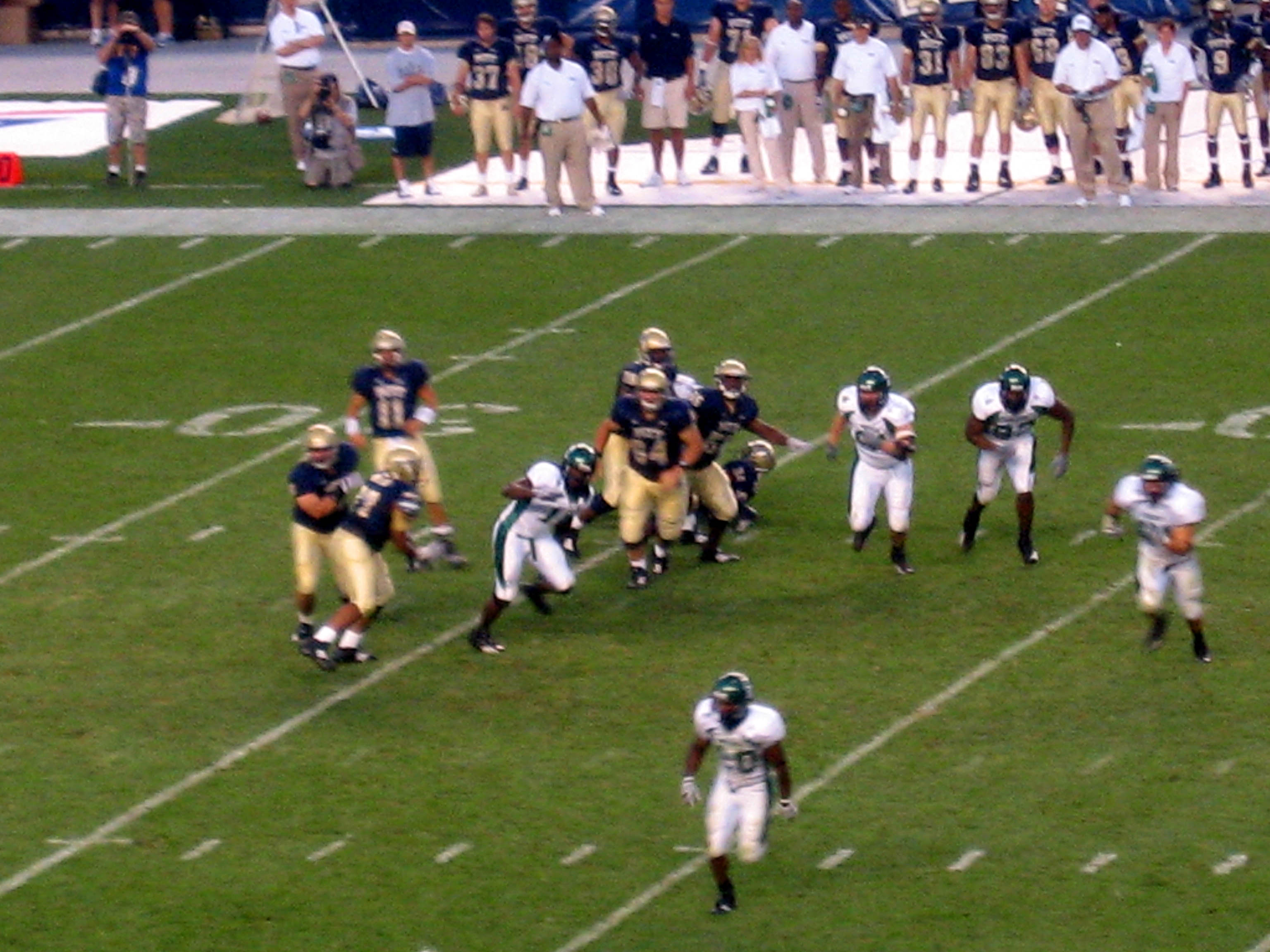
Eastern Michigan playing at Pittsburgh

=== Northern Illinois ===
After falling behind 13–0, the Eagles came back, and won 21–19 by blocking a Northern Illinois field goal attempt at the end of the game.

=== Michigan ===
	1	2	3	4	Total
Eastern Michigan	3	5	6	8	22
Michigan	10	6	17	0	33

The Eagles registered their best showing ever against the Michigan Wolverines. In this 33–22 loss, EMU largely stifled Michigan's all-time leading quarterback, Chad Henne, and returned a blocked kick for a touchdown.

=== Western Michigan ===
	1	2	3	4	Total
Broncos	2	0	0	0	2
Eagles	0	3	6	10	19

This game was the first of three games that would determine the 2007 Michigan MAC Trophy winner (Central Michigan vs. WMU November 17 and CMU vs. EMU November 17). Prior to this game, Western led the all-time series 26-14-2 and had not lost in Rynearson Stadium since 1991 (7 wins).

Only a first quarter safety kept the Eagles from registering their first shutout since 1997.

Recap | Boxscore | WMU pregame notes

=== Central Michigan ===
This was the final game in determining the 2007 Michigan MAC Trophy winner. With their win in this game, the Eagles captured the trophy for the first time.

== Personnel ==
=== Coaching staff ===
Name	Position	Year at school
Jeff Genyk	Head coach	4th

=== Recruits ===
College recruiting information
Name	Hometown	School	Height	Weight	40^{‡}	Commit date
Overall recruit ranking:
‡ Refers to 40-yard dash; Note: In many cases, Scout, Rivals, 247Sports, On3, and ESPN may conflict in their listings of height, weight and 40 time.; In these cases, the average was taken. ESPN grades are on a 100-point scale.; Sources: "Eastern Michigan Football Recruiting 2007". ESPN.; "2007 Team Ranking". Rivals.com.

== 2008 NFL draft ==
The following Eagle was selected in the 2008 NFL draft after the season.

Round	Pick	Player	Position	NFL club
2	54	Jason Jones	Defensive end	Tennessee Titans
