= 2007 Buffalo Bulls football team =

American college football season

2007 Buffalo Bulls football

MAC East Division co-champion
- Conference: Mid-American Conference
- East Division
- Record: 5–7 (5–3 MAC)
- Head coach: Turner Gill (2nd season)
- Offensive coordinator: Gerald Carr (2nd season)
- Captains: Kareem Byrom; Jamey Richard; Trevor Scott; Drew Willy
- Home stadium: University at Buffalo Stadium

2007 Mid-American Conference football standings
	Div			Conf.			Overall
Team	W		L	W		L	W		L
East Division
Miami (OH) xy	4	–	2	5	–	2	6	–	7
Bowling Green x	4	–	2	6	–	2	8	–	5
Buffalo x	4	–	2	5	–	3	5	–	7
Ohio	3	–	3	4	–	4	6	–	6
Temple	3	–	3	4	–	4	4	–	8
Akron	2	–	4	3	–	5	4	–	8
Kent State	1	–	5	1	–	7	3	–	9
West Division
Central Michigan xy$	4	–	1	6	–	1	8	–	6
Ball State x	4	–	1	5	–	2	7	–	6
Eastern Michigan	3	–	2	3	–	4	4	–	8
Western Michigan	2	–	3	3	–	4	5	–	7
Toledo	2	–	3	3	–	5	5	–	7
Northern Illinois	0	–	5	1	–	6	2	–	10
Championship: Central Michigan 35, Miami 10
$ – Conference champion; x – Division champion/co-champions; Due to an unbalanced conference schedule, the team with best division record within each division was awarded that division's championship game berth.

The 2007 Buffalo Bulls football team represented the University at Buffalo as a member of the Mid-American Conference (MAC) during the 2007 NCAA Division I FBS football season. Led by second-year head coach Turner Gill, the Bulls compiled an overall record of 5–7 with a mark of 5–3 in conference play, sharing MAC's East Division title with the Bowling Green Falcons and the Miami RedHawks. Based on tiebreakers, Miami advanced to the MAC Championship Game. The team played home games at the University at Buffalo Stadium in Amherst, New York.

== Schedule ==
Date	Time	Opponent	Site	TV	Result	Attendance	Source
August 30	7:00 p.m.	at No. 16 Rutgers*	Rutgers Stadium; Piscataway, NJ	MSG	L 3–38	43,091	
September 8	1:00 p.m.	at Temple	Lincoln Financial Field; Philadelphia, PA		W 42–7	15,629	
September 15	12:00 p.m.	at No. 12 Penn State*	Beaver Stadium; University Park, PA	BTN	L 24–45	107,506	
September 22	6:00 p.m.	Baylor*	University at Buffalo Stadium; Buffalo, NY		L 21–34	22,676	
September 29	1:00 p.m.	at Ball State	Scheumann Stadium; Muncie, IN		L 14–49	14,333	
October 6	1:00 p.m.	Ohio^{†}	University at Buffalo Stadium; Buffalo, NY		W 31–10	10,755	
October 13	1:00 p.m.	Toledo	University at Buffalo Stadium; Buffalo, NY		W 43–33	12,529	
October 20	4:00 p.m.	at Syracuse*	Carrier Dome; Syracuse, NY	ESPNU	L 12–20	30,897	
October 27	1:00 p.m.	Akron	University at Buffalo Stadium; Buffalo, NY		W 26–10	10,142	
November 3	3:00 p.m.	at Miami (OH)	Yager Stadium; Oxford, OH		L 28–31	12,288	
November 17	1:00 p.m.	Bowling Green	University at Buffalo Stadium; Buffalo, NY		L 17–31	11,740	
November 24	1:00 p.m.	at Kent State	Dix Stadium; Kent, OH		W 30–23 ^{OT}	2,687	
*Non-conference game; ^{†}Homecoming; Rankings from AP Poll released prior to the game; All times are in Eastern time

== After the season ==
=== NFL draft ===
For the first time in the history of the program, three players were signed by National Football League (NFL) teams. Trevor Scott and Jamey Richard were selected in the 2008 NFL draft by the Oakland Raiders and Indianapolis Colts respectively, while punter Ben Woods signed a free agent contract with the Cleveland Browns.

The following Bulls were selected in the NFL draft following the season.

Round	Pick	Player	Position	NFL club
6	169	Trevor Scott	Defensive end	Oakland Raiders
7	236	Jamey Richard	Center	Indianapolis Colts
