= 2007 Kent State Golden Flashes football team =

American college football season

2007 Kent State Golden Flashes football
- Conference: Mid-American Conference
- East
- Record: 3–9 (1–7 MAC)
- Head coach: Doug Martin (4th season)
- Offensive scheme: Air raid
- Defensive coordinator: Pete Rekstis (4th season)
- Base defense: 4–3
- Home stadium: Dix Stadium

2007 Mid-American Conference football standings
	Div			Conf.			Overall
Team	W		L	W		L	W		L
East Division
Miami (OH) xy	4	–	2	5	–	2	6	–	7
Bowling Green x	4	–	2	6	–	2	8	–	5
Buffalo x	4	–	2	5	–	3	5	–	7
Ohio	3	–	3	4	–	4	6	–	6
Temple	3	–	3	4	–	4	4	–	8
Akron	2	–	4	3	–	5	4	–	8
Kent State	1	–	5	1	–	7	3	–	9
West Division
Central Michigan xy$	4	–	1	6	–	1	8	–	6
Ball State x	4	–	1	5	–	2	7	–	6
Eastern Michigan	3	–	2	3	–	4	4	–	8
Western Michigan	2	–	3	3	–	4	5	–	7
Toledo	2	–	3	3	–	5	5	–	7
Northern Illinois	0	–	5	1	–	6	2	–	10
Championship: Central Michigan 35, Miami 10
$ – Conference champion; x – Division champion/co-champions; Due to an unbalanced conference schedule, the team with best division record within each division was awarded that division's championship game berth.

The 2007 Kent State Golden Flashes football team represented Kent State University during the 2007 NCAA Division I FBS football season. Kent State competed as a member of the Mid-American Conference (MAC), and played their home games at Dix Stadium. The Golden Flashes were led by fourth-year head coach Doug Martin.

== Schedule ==
Date	Time	Opponent	Site	TV	Result	Attendance
August 30	8:00 pm	at Iowa State*	Jack Trice Stadium; Ames, IA		W 23–14	47,313
September 8	6:00 pm	at Kentucky*	Commonwealth Stadium; Lexington, KY	ESPNGP	L 20–56	67,380
September 15	4:00 pm	Delaware State (FCS)*	Dix Stadium; Kent, OH		W 38–7	8,455
September 22	12:00 pm	at Akron	Rubber Bowl; Akron, OH (Battle for the Wagon Wheel)	ESPN+	L 20–27	21,867
September 29	3:00 pm	at Ohio	Peden Stadium; Athens, OH	FSN	W 33–25	18,297
October 6	3:00 pm	Miami (OH)^{†}	Dix Stadium; Kent, OH	FSN	L 13–20	17,165
October 13	12:00 pm	at No. 3 Ohio State*	Ohio Stadium; Columbus, OH	BTN	L 3–48	105,051
October 20	4:00 pm	Bowling Green	Dix Stadium; Kent, OH (Battle for the Anniversary Award)		L 20–31	10,248
October 27	1:00 pm	Central Michigan	Dix Stadium; Kent, OH		L 32–41	6,439
November 10	4:00 pm	at Northern Illinois	Huskie Stadium; DeKalb, IL	CSNC	L 20–27	13,831
November 17	12:00 pm	at Temple	Lincoln Financial Field; Philadelphia, PA		L 14–24	16,019
November 24	1:00 pm	Buffalo	Dix Stadium; Kent, OH		L 23–30 ^{OT}	2,687
*Non-conference game; ^{†}Homecoming; Rankings from AP Poll released prior to the game; All times are in Eastern time
