= 2007 Insight Bowl =

- 19th Insight Bowl
- Insight Bowl logo
Indiana Hoosiers	Oklahoma State Cowboys
(7–5)	(6–6)
Big Ten	Big 12
33	49
Head coach: Bill Lynch	Head coach: Mike Gundy
	1	2	3	4	Total
Indiana	3	7	7	16	33
Oklahoma State	21	14	7	7	49
- Date: December 31, 2007
- Season: 2007
- Stadium: Sun Devil Stadium
- Location: Tempe, Arizona
- MVP: Offensive: OSU QB Zac Robinson; Defensive: OSU S Donovan Woods
- Favorite: Oklahoma State by 4
- Referee: Jack Folliard (Pac-10)
- Payout: US$1.2 million per team

United States TV coverage
- Network: NFL Network
- Announcers: Bob Papa, Sterling Sharpe, Mike Mayock, and Kim Jones

The 2007 Insight Bowl was the 19th edition of the Insight Bowl. Part of the 2007–08 NCAA football bowl games season, it was played on December 31, 2007, at Sun Devil Stadium on the Arizona State University campus in Tempe, Arizona.

The opponents were the Indiana Hoosiers of the Big Ten Conference and the Oklahoma State Cowboys of the Big 12 Conference. This marked the third consecutive year of Big 10 and Big 12 tie-ins for this bowl game.

Both teams had tumultuous seasons. The Hoosiers' previous head coach, Terry Hoeppner, died in June 2007 and Bill Lynch took over the program. The team's season-long mantra was "Play 13," referring to the goal of earning a bowl game after the 12-game regular season. This was Indiana's first bowl appearance since 1993. Meanwhile, Cowboys head coach Mike Gundy gained widespread attention across North America for a tirade against a sportswriter for The Daily Oklahoman. The outburst was frequently displayed on TV sportscasts and online. The Cowboys were 6–6 on the season and unranked nationally, a generally disappointing outcome for a team with a highly touted pre-season offense. Zac Robinson, who replaced Bobby Reid as the starting quarterback early in the year, led the offense.
