= 2007 Toledo Rockets football team =

American college football season

2007 Toledo Rockets football
- Conference: Mid-American Conference
- West Division
- Record: 5–7 (3–5 MAC)
- Head coach: Tom Amstutz (7th season)
- Offensive coordinator: John Shannon (3rd season)
- Offensive scheme: Spread
- Defensive coordinator: Tim Rose (3rd season)
- Base defense: 3–4
- Home stadium: Glass Bowl

2007 Mid-American Conference football standings
	Div			Conf.			Overall
Team	W		L	W		L	W		L
East Division
Miami (OH) xy	4	–	2	5	–	2	6	–	7
Bowling Green x	4	–	2	6	–	2	8	–	5
Buffalo x	4	–	2	5	–	3	5	–	7
Ohio	3	–	3	4	–	4	6	–	6
Temple	3	–	3	4	–	4	4	–	8
Akron	2	–	4	3	–	5	4	–	8
Kent State	1	–	5	1	–	7	3	–	9
West Division
Central Michigan xy$	4	–	1	6	–	1	8	–	6
Ball State x	4	–	1	5	–	2	7	–	6
Eastern Michigan	3	–	2	3	–	4	4	–	8
Western Michigan	2	–	3	3	–	4	5	–	7
Toledo	2	–	3	3	–	5	5	–	7
Northern Illinois	0	–	5	1	–	6	2	–	10
Championship: Central Michigan 35, Miami 10
$ – Conference champion; x – Division champion/co-champions; Due to an unbalanced conference schedule, the team with best division record within each division was awarded that division's championship game berth.

The 2007 Toledo Rockets football team represented the University of Toledo during the 2007 NCAA Division I FBS football season. They competed as a member of the Mid-American Conference (MAC) in the West Division. The Rockets were led by head coach Tom Amstutz.

== Schedule ==
Date	Time	Opponent	Site	TV	Result	Attendance	Source
September 1	7:00 pm	Purdue*	Glass Bowl; Toledo, OH	ESPNU	L 24–52	26,100	
September 8	7:00 pm	at Central Michigan	Kelly/Shorts Stadium; Mount Pleasant, MI		L 31–52	22,031	
September 15	7:00 pm	at Kansas*	Memorial Stadium; Lawrence, KS		L 13–45	48,112	
September 22	7:00 pm	Iowa State*	Glass Bowl; Toledo, OH		W 36–35	15,219	
September 29	7:00 pm	Western Michigan	Glass Bowl; Toledo, OH		L 28–42	18,542	
October 6	7:00 pm	Liberty*^{†}	Glass Bowl; Toledo, OH		W 35–34	16,071	
October 13	1:00 pm	at Buffalo	UB Stadium; Amherst, NY		L 38–43	12,529	
October 20	7:00 pm	Ohio	Glass Bowl; Toledo, OH		W 43–40	18,928	
October 27	7:00 pm	Northern Illinois	Glass Bowl; Toledo, OH		W 70–21	18,545	
November 3	7:00 pm	Eastern Michigan	Glass Bowl; Toledo, OH		W 52–28	17,270	
November 13	7:30 pm	at Ball State	Scheumann Stadium; Muncie, IN	ESPN2	L 20–41	10,162	
November 23	2:30 pm	at Bowling Green	Doyt Perry Stadium; Bowling Green, OH (Battle of I-75)	ESPNU	L 10–37	18,926	
*Non-conference game; ^{†}Homecoming; All times are in Eastern time

== After the season ==
=== NFL draft ===
The following Rockets were selected in the 2008 NFL draft following the season.

Round	Pick	Player	Position	NFL club
3	65	John Greco	Tackle	St. Louis Rams
6	176	Jalen Parmele	Running back	Miami Dolphins
