= 2007 Central Michigan Chippewas football team =

American college football season

2007 Central Michigan Chippewas football

MAC champion MAC West Division co-champion

MAC Championship Game, W 35–10 vs. Miami (OH)

Motor City Bowl, L 48–51 vs. Purdue
- Conference: Mid-American Conference
- West Division
- Record: 8–6 (6–1 MAC)
- Head coach: Butch Jones (1st season)
- Offensive coordinator: Mike Bajakian (1st season)
- Defensive coordinator: Tim Banks (1st season)
- Home stadium: Kelly/Shorts Stadium

2007 Mid-American Conference football standings
	Div			Conf.			Overall
Team	W		L	W		L	W		L
East Division
Miami (OH) xy	4	–	2	5	–	2	6	–	7
Bowling Green x	4	–	2	6	–	2	8	–	5
Buffalo x	4	–	2	5	–	3	5	–	7
Ohio	3	–	3	4	–	4	6	–	6
Temple	3	–	3	4	–	4	4	–	8
Akron	2	–	4	3	–	5	4	–	8
Kent State	1	–	5	1	–	7	3	–	9
West Division
Central Michigan xy$	4	–	1	6	–	1	8	–	6
Ball State x	4	–	1	5	–	2	7	–	6
Eastern Michigan	3	–	2	3	–	4	4	–	8
Western Michigan	2	–	3	3	–	4	5	–	7
Toledo	2	–	3	3	–	5	5	–	7
Northern Illinois	0	–	5	1	–	6	2	–	10
Championship: Central Michigan 35, Miami 10
$ – Conference champion; x – Division champion/co-champions; Due to an unbalanced conference schedule, the team with best division record within each division was awarded that division's championship game berth.

The 2007 Central Michigan Chippewas football team represented Central Michigan University during the 2007 NCAA Division I FBS football season. Central Michigan competed as a member of the West Division of the Mid-American Conference (MAC). The Chippewas were led by first-year head coach Butch Jones.

Central Michigan finished the regular season with a 7–5 record and a 6–1 record in conference play, placing first in the West Division. They qualified for the MAC Championship Game, where they defeated the Miami RedHawks 35–10. Central Michigan competed in the Motor City Bowl for the second straight year, losing to the Purdue Boilermakers 48–51.

== Schedule ==
Date	Time	Opponent	Site	TV	Result	Attendance	Source
September 1	6:00 pm	at Kansas*	Memorial Stadium; Lawrence, KS		L 7–52	46,815	
September 8	7:00 pm	Toledo	Kelly/Shorts Stadium; Mount Pleasant, MI		W 52–31	22,031	
September 15	12:00 pm	at Purdue*	Ross–Ade Stadium; West Lafayette, IN	ESPN2	L 22–45	60,038	
September 22	3:30 pm	North Dakota State*	Kelly/Shorts Stadium; Mount Pleasant, MI		L 14–44	16,522	
September 29	12:00 pm	Northern Illinois^{†}	Kelly/Shorts Stadium; Mount Pleasant, MI	ESPN Plus	W 35–10	18,465	
October 6	12:00 pm	at Ball State	Scheumann Stadium; Muncie, IN	ESPN Plus	W 58–38	9,617	
October 13	3:30 pm	Army*	Kelly/Shorts Stadium; Mount Pleasant, MI	CL	W 47–23	21,013	
October 20	12:00 pm	at Clemson*	Memorial Stadium; Clemson, SC	ESPNU	L 14–70	81,361	
October 27	1:00 pm	at Kent State	Dix Stadium; Kent, OH		W 41–32	6,439	
November 6	7:30 pm	at Western Michigan	Waldo Stadium; Kalamazoo, MI (rivalry)	ESPN2	W 34–31	16,952	
November 16	7:00 pm	Eastern Michigan	Kelly/Shorts Stadium; Mount Pleasant, MI (rivalry)	CL	L 45–48	15,822	
November 23	11:00 am	at Akron	Rubber Bowl; Akron, OH		W 35–32	15,573	
December 1	11:00 am	vs. Miami (OH)	Ford Field; Detroit, MI (MAC Championship Game)	ESPN2	W 35–10	25,013	
December 26	7:30 pm	vs. Purdue*	Ford Field; Detroit, MI (Motor City Bowl)	ESPN	L 48–51	60,624	
*Non-conference game; ^{†}Homecoming; All times are in Eastern time

== Roster ==
2007 Central Michigan Chippewas football team roster
Players
Coaches
Offense

Pos.	#	Name	Class
WR	27	Antonio Brown	Fr
QB	13	Dan LeFevour	So
TE	82	J. J. Watt	Fr

Defense

Pos.	#	Name	Class

Special teams

Pos.	#	Name	Class

Head coach

- Butch Jones

Coordinators/assistant coaches

Legend

- (C) Team captain
- (S) Suspended
- (I) Ineligible
- Injured
- Redshirt

Roster
Last update: 2011-11-03
