= 2007 Akron Zips football team =

American college football season

2007 Akron Zips football
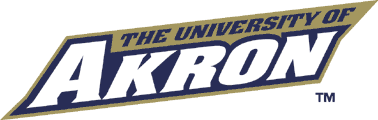
- Conference: Mid-American Conference
- East Division
- Record: 4–8 (3–5 MAC)
- Head coach: J. D. Brookhart (4th season)
- Offensive coordinator: Joe Moorhead (1st season)
- Defensive coordinator: Jim Fleming (4th season)
- Home stadium: Rubber Bowl

2007 Mid-American Conference football standings
	Div			Conf.			Overall
Team	W		L	W		L	W		L
East Division
Miami (OH) xy	4	–	2	5	–	2	6	–	7
Bowling Green x	4	–	2	6	–	2	8	–	5
Buffalo x	4	–	2	5	–	3	5	–	7
Ohio	3	–	3	4	–	4	6	–	6
Temple	3	–	3	4	–	4	4	–	8
Akron	2	–	4	3	–	5	4	–	8
Kent State	1	–	5	1	–	7	3	–	9
West Division
Central Michigan xy$	4	–	1	6	–	1	8	–	6
Ball State x	4	–	1	5	–	2	7	–	6
Eastern Michigan	3	–	2	3	–	4	4	–	8
Western Michigan	2	–	3	3	–	4	5	–	7
Toledo	2	–	3	3	–	5	5	–	7
Northern Illinois	0	–	5	1	–	6	2	–	10
Championship: Central Michigan 35, Miami 10
$ – Conference champion; x – Division champion/co-champions; Due to an unbalanced conference schedule, the team with best division record within each division was awarded that division's championship game berth.

The 2007 Akron Zips football team represented the University of Akron in the 2007 NCAA Division I FBS football season. Akron competed as a member of the East Division of the Mid-American Conference (MAC). The Zips were led by J. D. Brookhart in his fourth year as head coach.

== Schedule ==
Date	Time	Opponent	Site	TV	Result	Attendance
September 1	7:00 p.m.	vs. Army*	Cleveland Browns Stadium; Cleveland, OH (Patriot Bowl)	ESPN Plus	W 22–14	17,865
September 8	12:00 p.m.	at No. 12 Ohio State*	Ohio Stadium; Columbus, OH	BTN	L 2–20	104,317
September 15	12:00 p.m.	at Indiana*	Memorial Stadium; Bloomington, IN	BTN	L 24–41	31,196
September 22	12:00 p.m.	Kent State	Rubber Bowl; Akron, OH (Wagon Wheel)	ESPN Plus	W 27–20	21,867
September 29	12:00 p.m.	at Connecticut*	Rentschler Field; East Hartford, CT	ESPN Plus	L 10–44	38,212
October 6	7:00 p.m.	at Western Michigan	Waldo Stadium; Kalamazoo, MI		W 39–38	25,610
October 13	6:00 p.m.	Temple	Rubber Bowl; Akron, OH		L 20–24	14,017
October 25	1:00 p.m.	at Buffalo	University at Buffalo Stadium; Amherst		L 10–26	10,142
November 2	7:30 p.m.	at Bowling Green	Doyt Perry Stadium; Bowling Green, OH		L 20–44	12,766
November 7	7:30 p.m.	Ohio	Rubber Bowl; Akron, OH	ESPN2	W 48–37	12,453
November 14	7:30 p.m.	at Miami (OH)	Yager Stadium; Oxford, OH	ESPN2	L 0–7	13,274
November 23	11:00 a.m.	Central Michigan	Rubber Bowl; Akron, OH	ESPNU	L 32–35	15,573
*Non-conference game; Rankings from AP Poll released prior to the game; All times are in Eastern time
