= 2007 MAC Championship Game =

2007 Marathon MAC Championship Game
- Conference Championship
- 2007 MAC Championship logo.
Miami RedHawks	Central Michigan Chippewas
(6–6)	(7–5)
10	35
Head coach: Shane Montgomery	Head coach: Butch Jones
	1	2	3	4	Total
Miami	0	0	3	7	10
Central Michigan	7	0	7	21	35
- Date: December 1, 2007
- Season: 2007
- Stadium: Ford Field
- Location: Detroit, Michigan
- MVP: Dan LeFevour (QB, CMU)
- Favorite: Central Michigan by 3
- Referee: Stan Evans, Jim Thomas, Norm Eubank
- Attendance: 25,013

United States TV coverage
- Network: ESPN2

2007 Mid-American Conference football standings
	Div			Conf.			Overall
Team	W		L	W		L	W		L
East Division
Miami (OH) xy	4	–	2	5	–	2	6	–	7
Bowling Green x	4	–	2	6	–	2	8	–	5
Buffalo x	4	–	2	5	–	3	5	–	7
Ohio	3	–	3	4	–	4	6	–	6
Temple	3	–	3	4	–	4	4	–	8
Akron	2	–	4	3	–	5	4	–	8
Kent State	1	–	5	1	–	7	3	–	9
West Division
Central Michigan xy$	4	–	1	6	–	1	8	–	6
Ball State x	4	–	1	5	–	2	7	–	6
Eastern Michigan	3	–	2	3	–	4	4	–	8
Western Michigan	2	–	3	3	–	4	5	–	7
Toledo	2	–	3	3	–	5	5	–	7
Northern Illinois	0	–	5	1	–	6	2	–	10
Championship: Central Michigan 35, Miami 10
$ – Conference champion; x – Division champion/co-champions; Due to an unbalanced conference schedule, the team with best division record within each division was awarded that division's championship game berth.

The 2007 MAC Championship Game was played on December 1, 2007 at Ford Field in Detroit, Michigan. The game featured the winner of each division of the Mid-American Conference. The game featured the Miami RedHawks, of the East Division, and the Central Michigan Chippewas, of the West Division. The Chippewas beat the RedHawks 35–10. This was Central Michigan's second straight Mid-American Conference championship.
