= 2007 Northern Illinois Huskies football team =

American college football season

2007 Northern Illinois Huskies football
- Conference: Mid-American Conference
- West Division
- Record: 2–10 (1–6 MAC)
- Head coach: Joe Novak (12th season)
- Offensive coordinator: Roy Wittke (1st season)
- Defensive coordinator: Denny Doornbos (4th season)
- MVPs: Justin Anderson; Larry English
- Captains: Britt Davis; Larry English; Tim McCarthy; Dan Nicholson
- Home stadium: Huskie Stadium

2007 Mid-American Conference football standings
	Div			Conf.			Overall
Team	W		L	W		L	W		L
East Division
Miami (OH) xy	4	–	2	5	–	2	6	–	7
Bowling Green x	4	–	2	6	–	2	8	–	5
Buffalo x	4	–	2	5	–	3	5	–	7
Ohio	3	–	3	4	–	4	6	–	6
Temple	3	–	3	4	–	4	4	–	8
Akron	2	–	4	3	–	5	4	–	8
Kent State	1	–	5	1	–	7	3	–	9
West Division
Central Michigan xy$	4	–	1	6	–	1	8	–	6
Ball State x	4	–	1	5	–	2	7	–	6
Eastern Michigan	3	–	2	3	–	4	4	–	8
Western Michigan	2	–	3	3	–	4	5	–	7
Toledo	2	–	3	3	–	5	5	–	7
Northern Illinois	0	–	5	1	–	6	2	–	10
Championship: Central Michigan 35, Miami 10
$ – Conference champion; x – Division champion/co-champions; Due to an unbalanced conference schedule, the team with best division record within each division was awarded that division's championship game berth.

The 2007 Northern Illinois Huskies football team represented Northern Illinois University as a member of the West Division of the Mid-American Conference (MAC) during the 2007 NCAA Division I FBS football season. Led by Joe Novak in his 12th and final season as head coach, the Huskies compiled an overall record of 2–10 with a mark of 1–6 in conference play, placing last out of six teams in the MAC's West Division. Northern Illinois played home games at Huskie Stadium in DeKalb, Illinois.

Novak retired after the season.

== Schedule ==
Date	Time	Opponent	Site	TV	Result	Attendance	Source
September 1	2:30 pm	vs. Iowa*	Soldier Field; Chicago, IL	ESPNU	L 3–16	61,500	
September 8	6:30 pm	No. 11 (FCS) Southern Illinois*	Huskie Stadium; DeKalb, IL	CSNC	L 31–34	24,182	
September 15	11:00 am	Eastern Michigan	Huskie Stadium; DeKalb, IL	ESPN+	L 19–21	20,012	
September 22	4:00 pm	at Idaho*	Kibbie Dome; Moscow, ID	ESPNGP	W 42–35	12,461	
September 29	11:00 am	at Central Michigan	Kelly/Shorts Stadium; Mount Pleasant, MI	ESPN+	L 10–35	18,465	
October 6	12:00 pm	at Temple	Lincoln Financial Field; Philadelphia, PA		L 15–16	21,065	
October 13	3:00 pm	Western Michigan^{†}	Huskie Stadium; DeKalb, IL	CSNC	L 13–17	23,057	
October 20	11:00 am	at Wisconsin*	Camp Randall Stadium; Madison, WI	BTN	L 3–44	81,883	
October 27	6:00 pm	at Toledo	Glass Bowl; Toledo, OH		L 21–70	18,545	
November 10	3:00 pm	Kent State	Huskie Stadium; DeKalb, IL	CSNC	W 27–20	13,831	
November 17	2:30 pm	Navy*	Navy–Marine Corps Memorial Stadium; Annapolis, MD	CSTV	L 24–35	34,517	
November 24	3:00 pm	Ball State	Huskie Stadium; DeKalb, IL (rivalry)	CSNC	L 21–27	8,237	
*Non-conference game; ^{†}Homecoming; Rankings from AP Poll released prior to the game; All times are in Central time
