= 2007 Bowling Green Falcons football team =

American college football season

2007 Bowling Green Falcons football

MAC East Division co-champion

GMAC Bowl, L 7–63 vs Tulsa
- Conference: Mid-American Conference
- East
- Record: 8–5 (6–2 MAC)
- Head coach: Gregg Brandon (5th season)
- Offensive coordinator: Mick McCall (1st season)
- Defensive coordinator: Mike Ward (1st as DC, 8th overall season)
- Home stadium: Doyt Perry Stadium

2007 Mid-American Conference football standings
	Div			Conf.			Overall
Team	W		L	W		L	W		L
East Division
Miami (OH) xy	4	–	2	5	–	2	6	–	7
Bowling Green x	4	–	2	6	–	2	8	–	5
Buffalo x	4	–	2	5	–	3	5	–	7
Ohio	3	–	3	4	–	4	6	–	6
Temple	3	–	3	4	–	4	4	–	8
Akron	2	–	4	3	–	5	4	–	8
Kent State	1	–	5	1	–	7	3	–	9
West Division
Central Michigan xy$	4	–	1	6	–	1	8	–	6
Ball State x	4	–	1	5	–	2	7	–	6
Eastern Michigan	3	–	2	3	–	4	4	–	8
Western Michigan	2	–	3	3	–	4	5	–	7
Toledo	2	–	3	3	–	5	5	–	7
Northern Illinois	0	–	5	1	–	6	2	–	10
Championship: Central Michigan 35, Miami 10
$ – Conference champion; x – Division champion/co-champions; Due to an unbalanced conference schedule, the team with best division record within each division was awarded that division's championship game berth.

The 2007 Bowling Green Falcons football team represented Bowling Green State University in the 2007 NCAA Division I FBS football season. The team was coached by Gregg Brandon and played their home games in Doyt Perry Stadium in Bowling Green, Ohio. It was the 89th season of play for the Falcons. Bowling Green finished the season 8–5 overall and has finished 4–2 in the MAC East. They participated in the GMAC Bowl, losing to Tulsa 63–7. They capped the regular season by beating arch rival Toledo for the first time in 3 years.

== Pre-season ==
Bowling Green was picked to finish fifth in the MAC East Division by the MAC News Media Association. Three Falcons, Senior Kory Lichtensteiger and Juniors Erique Dozier and Corey Partridge, garnered preseason honors by being named to All-MAC preseason teams.

=== All-MAC preseason teams ===
- First team
  - Kory Lichtensteiger, C
- Second team
  - Erique Dozier, LB
  - Corey Partridge, WR

== Schedule ==
Date	Time	Opponent	Site	TV	Result	Attendance
September 1	8:00 pm	at Minnesota*	Hubert H. Humphrey Metrodome; Minneapolis, MN	BTN	W 32–31 ^{OT}	49,253
September 8	12:00 pm	at Michigan State*	Spartan Stadium; East Lansing, MI	BTN	L 17–28	67,276
September 22	12:00 pm	Temple	Doyt Perry Stadium; Bowling Green, OH	ESPN+	W 48–35	16,482
September 29	6:00 pm	Western Kentucky*^{†}	Doyt Perry Stadium; Bowling Green, OH		W 42–21	20,622
October 6	12:00 pm	at No. 7 Boston College*	Alumni Stadium; Chestnut Hill, MA	ESPNU	L 24–55	40,117
October 13	3:00 pm	at Miami (OH)	Yager Stadium; Oxford, OH	FSNO	L 14–47	16,148
October 20	4:00 pm	at Kent State	Dix Stadium; Kent, OH (Battle for the Anniversary Award)		W 31–20	10,248
October 27	6:00 pm	Ohio	Doyt Perry Stadium; Bowling Green, OH	ESPNGP	L 27–38	11,602
November 2	7:30 pm	Akron	Doyt Perry Stadium; Bowling Green, OH	ESPNU	W 44–20	12,766
November 9	7:30 pm	at Eastern Michigan	Rynearson Stadium; Ypsilanti, MI	ESPNU	W 39–32	4,304
November 17	1:00 pm	at Buffalo	University at Buffalo Stadium; Buffalo, NY		W 31–17	11,740
November 23	2:30 pm	Toledo	Doyt Perry Stadium; Bowling Green, OH (Peace Pipe Trophy)	ESPNU	W 37–10	18,926
January 6	8:00 pm	vs. Tulsa	Ladd–Peebles Stadium; Mobile, AL (GMAC Bowl)	ESPN	L 7–63	36,932
*Non-conference game; ^{†}Homecoming; Rankings from AP Poll released prior to the game; All times are in Eastern time

== Roster ==
The 2007 Bowling Green Falcons football team consists of 96 total players. The class breakdown of these players is 12 seniors, 21 juniors, 30 sophomores, 12 redshirt freshman, and 19 true freshman. Returning starters from the 2006 team are six offensive starters and eight defensive starters. Overall, 53 lettermen are returning from the 2006 team (25 on offense, 28 on defense and 0 on special teams).

Wide Receivers: 7 Barnes, Freddie – Sophomore; 84 Brighton, Derek – (redshirt) Freshman; 6 Charles, Zach – Sophomore; 80 Cheathem, Keston – Junior; 81 Emans, Matt – Senior; 82 Hodges, Adrian – Freshman; 85 Hutson, Ray – Freshman; 86 Kelley, Jermiah – Junior; 3 Parks, Marques – Junior; 1 Partridge, Corey – Junior; 83 Pronty, Tyrone – Sophomore; 15 Wiley, Calvin – Sophomore; 12 Wright, Chris – Sophomore; Offensive Lineman: 64 Albert, Scott – Sophomore; 61 Bojicic, Ben- Freshman; 60 Buckosh, Jarrett – Sophomore; 55 Curtis, Brandon – Junior; 66 Dodge, Josh – Freshman; 46 Donahue, Tyler – (redshirt) Freshman; 74 Fink, Jeff – Junior; 73 Huelsman, Kevin – Senior; 76 Kent, Aaron – Junior; 78 Lichtensteiger, Kory – Senior; 50 Mack, Brandon – Senior; 70 Minturn, Brady – Sophomore; 71 Nystrom, Drew – Senior; 72 Stanford, Andrew – Senior; 75 Steffy, Shane – Sophomore; 65 Watson, Pat – Senior; Tight End: 91 Rieke, Nick – (redshirt) Freshman; 89 Scheidler, Jimmy – Sophomore; Quarterback: 14 Brown, Nathan – Freshman; 8 Glaud, Anthony – (redshirt) Freshman; 16 Hunter, Tony – Sophomore; 13 Sheehan, Tyler – Sophomore; 17 Turner, Anthony – Junior	Running Back: 33 Bullock, Chris – Sophomore; 28 Geter, Willie – Freshman; 49 Lawrence, Nick – Sophomore; 5 Macon, Dan – Senior; 19 Ransom, Eric – Junior; 34 Van Demark, Curtis – Sophomore; 35 Waldron, Nate – Junior; 11 Winovich, Pete – Senior; Defensive Lineman: 92 Alvarado, Kevin – Freshman; 63 Barrow, Orlando – (redshirt) Freshman; 96 Branch, Darren – Freshman; 99 Briggs, Diyral – Junior; 62 Burrell, Preston – Freshman; 95 Davis, Nick – Junior; 93 Hardwick, Jacob – Sophomore; 98 Johnson, Andrew – Freshman; 88 O'Drobinak, Sean – Senior; 90 Ream, Michael – Sophomore; 40 Schaefer, Joe – Junior; 77 Torresso, Nick – Freshmann; Defensive Tackles: 87 Young, D.J. – Sophomore; Defensive End: 47 Baker, Adrian – Junior; 93 Hartung, Garth – Sophomore; 51 Magnone, Angelo – (redshirt) Freshman; 97 Smith, Darius – (redshirt) Freshman; 94 Tipton, Carlos – (redshirt) Freshman; Cornerbacks: 18 Williams, Derrick – Freshman; 28 Wooldridge, Mark – Freshman; Defensive Backs: 24 Brown, Jahmal – Sophomore; 22 Corner, Vincent – Sophomore; 37 Davis, Aaron – Sophomore; 27 Fillari, Giovanni – Junior; 21 Lewis, Kenny – Junior; 23 Lewis, Tarell – Sophomore; 25 Mahone, P.J. – Sophomore; 10 Marshall, Calvin – (redshirt) Freshman; 32 Mosley, Anthony – Freshman; 4 Sanderson, Jerett – Sophomore; 2 Smith, Antonio – Junior; 32 Tomlinson, Alfred – (redshirt) Freshman; 31 Williams, Roger – Sophomore; 14 Walker, Freddie – Junior	Linebackers: 45 Basler, Cody – Sophomore; 56 Tyler, Jason - Freshman; 57 Dahlman, Neal – Freshman; 53 Davis, Jerrson – Sophomore; 30 Dozier, Erique – Junior; 42 Fells, Eugene – (redshirt) Freshman; 44 Haneline, John – Junior; 9 Hargrove, Loren – Senior; 43 Jackson, Brandon – Sophomore; 36 Parks, Lewis – (redshirt) Freshman; 35 Scheidler, Josh – Sophomore; 52 Stanley, Glen – Freshman; 48 Wright, Gary – Freshman; 38 Young, Chris – Freshman; Long Snappers: 54 Cutler, Kyle – Senior; 46 Rutherford, Craig – Sophomore; Kickers: 39 Norsic, Matthew – Sophomore; 41 Vrvilo, Sinisia – Junior; Punters: 26 Iovinelli, Nick – Junior

== Coaching staff ==
- Gregg Brandon – Head Coach
- Troy Rothenbuhler – Asst. Head Coach/Tight Ends/Recruiting
- Mick McCall – Offensive Coordinator
- Mike Ward – Defensive Coordinator
- Stephen Bird – Special Teams/Outside Receivers
- Matt Campbell – Offensive Line
- Adam Gonzaga – Secondary
- Deion Melvin – Linebackers
- John Hunter – Running Backs
- Doug Phillips – Defensive Line
- Jason Morton – Offensive Assistant
- Brad Wilson – Defensive Assistant
- Aaron Hillmann – Strength and Conditioning
- David Ebersbach – Director of Operations

== Postseason ==
As the 2007 college football season neared the end, many organizations began to announce finalists and winners of various post-season awards. Kory Lichtensteiger was named a finalist for the Rimington Trophy, given to the nation's best center. He was one of 6 athletes recognized. Bowling Green also had eight players make the All-Conference Teams (the fourth most of any school in the MAC).

All-MAC First Team
- Kory Lichtensteiger, Sr., C
- Diyral Briggs, Jr., DL

All-MAC Second Team
- Drew Nystrom, Sr., OL
- P.J. Mahone, So., DB

All-MAC Third Team
- Tyler Sheehan, So., QB
- Freddie Barnes, So., WR
- Sinisa Vrvilo, Jr., PK
- Antonio Smith, Jr., DB

== Statistics ==
=== Team ===
	Team	Opp
Scoring	392	417
Points per game	30.2	32.1
First downs	299	302
Rushing	113	146
Passing	170	126
Penalty	16	30
Total offense	5232	5518
Avg per play	5.6	5.8
Avg per game	402.5	424.5
Fumbles-Lost	19–12	24–12
Penalties-Yards	85–731	75–669
Avg per game	56.2	51.5

	Team	Opp
Punts-Yards	55-2035	54-2066
Avg per punt	37.0	38.3
Time of possession/Game	28:41	31:19
3rd down conversions	74/180 (41%)	83/180 (46%)
4th down conversions	12/21 (57%)	7/17 (41%)
Touchdowns scored	49	55
Field goals-Attempts-Long	15–19	11–16
PAT-Attempts	47–47 (100%)	50–51 (98%)
Attendance	80398	199086
Games/Avg per Game	5/16080	7/28441
Neutral Site		1/36932

==== Scores by quarter ====
	1	2	3	4	Total
Opponents	102	109	77	122	410
Bowling Green	85	110	107	82	384

=== Offense ===
==== Rushing ====
Name	GP-GS	Att	Gain	Loss	Net	Avg	TD	Long	Avg/G
Turner, Anthony	13	106	552	33	519	4.9	9	39	39.9
Geter, Willie	12	71	457	25	432	6.1	1	50	36.0
Bullock, Chris	11	64	314	33	281	4.4	0	24	25.5
Macon, Dan	13	36	186	24	162	4.5	2	26	12.5
Sheehan, Tyler	13	93	366	218	148	1.6	3	23	11.4
Ransom, Eric	2	9	46	0	46	5.1	0	14	23.0
Glaud, Anthony	8	15	56	36	20	1.3	0	13	2.5
Barnes, Freddie	13	3	11	0	11	3.7	0	8	0.8
Partridge, Corey	8	2	9	0	9	4.5	0	7	1.1
Steffy, Shane	12	0	0	0	0	0	1	0	0
TEAM	10	15	0	31	−31	−2.1	0	0	−3.1
Total	13	418	2007	400	1607	3.8	16	50	123.6
Opponents	13	570	2950	248	2702	4.7	25	63	207.8

==== Passing ====
Name	GP-GS	Effic	Cmp-Att-Int	Pct	Yds	TD	Lng	Avg/G
Sheehan, Tyler Murray (the bomb)	13	132.6	303–476–11	63.7	3264	23	83	251.1
Glaud, Anthony	8	133.2	23–36–2	63.9	266	2	32	33.2
Turner, Anthony	13	387.2	4–5–0	80.0	65	3	33	5.0
Barnes, Freddie	13	0.0	0–2–1	0.0	0	0	0	0.0
Partridge, Corey	8	631.6	1–1–0	100.0	24	1	24	3.0
Brighton, Derek	12	150.4	1–1–0	100.0	6	0	6	0.5
TEAM	10	0.0	0–1–0	0.0	0	0	0	0.0
Total	13	134.9	332–522–14	63.6	3625	29	83	278.8
Opponents	13	138.5	230–381–14	60.4	2816	27	76	216.6

==== Receiving ====
Name	GP-GS	No.	Yds	Avg	TD	Long	Avg/G
Barnes, Freddie	13	82	962	11.7	9	44	74.0
Partridge, Corey	8	46	453	9.8	2	28	56.6
Geter, Willie	12	37	296	8.0	0	33	24.7
Parks, Marques	13	28	360	12.9	5	36	27.7
Wright, Chris	12	26	370	14.2	3	83	30.8
Turner, Anthony	13	22	185	8.4	1	31	14.2
Pronty, Tyrone	13	19	165	8.7	2	23	12.7
Winovich, Pete	13	15	93	6.2	0	11	7.2
Kelley, Jermiah	9	12	219	18.2	3	52	24.3
Charles, Zach	13	10	102	10.2	0	49	7.8
Brighton, Derek	12	10	97	9.7	0	18	8.1
Ransom, Eric	2	9	117	13.0	1	53	58.5
Macon, Dan	13	7	100	14.3	1	43	7.7
Bullock, Chris	11	4	29	7.2	0	11	2.6
Sheehan, Tyler	13	2	49	24.5	2	25	3.8
Cheathem, Keston	8	2	32	16.0	0	25	4.0
Scheidler, Jimmy	13	1	−4	−4.0	0	0	−0.3
Total	13	332	3625	10.9	29	83	278.8
Opponents	13	230	2816	12.2	27	76	216.6

Statistics from: "Bowling Green – Cumulative Season Statistic". BGSUFalcons.com. Archived from the original on February 12, 2009.
