= 2007 Indiana Hoosiers football team =

American college football season

2007 Indiana Hoosiers football

Insight Bowl, L 33–49 vs. Oklahoma State
- Conference: Big Ten Conference
- Record: 7–6 (3–5 Big Ten)
- Head coach: Bill Lynch (1st season)
- Offensive coordinator: Matt Canada (1st season)
- Co-defensive coordinators: Brian George (3rd season); Joe Palcic (3rd season)
- MVP: James Hardy
- Captains: Tracy Porter; Josiah Sears
- Home stadium: Memorial Stadium

2007 Big Ten Conference football standings
| | Conf. | | | Overall |
| Team | W | | L | W | | L |
|---|---|---|---|---|---|---|
| No. 5 Ohio State $ | 7 | – | 1 | 11 | – | 2 |
| No. 18 Michigan | 6 | – | 2 | 9 | – | 4 |
| No. 20 Illinois % | 6 | – | 2 | 9 | – | 4 |
| No. 24 Wisconsin | 5 | – | 3 | 9 | – | 4 |
| Penn State | 4 | – | 4 | 9 | – | 4 |
| Iowa | 4 | – | 4 | 6 | – | 6 |
| Purdue | 3 | – | 5 | 8 | – | 5 |
| Indiana | 3 | – | 5 | 7 | – | 6 |
| Michigan State | 3 | – | 5 | 7 | – | 6 |
| Northwestern | 3 | – | 5 | 6 | – | 6 |
| Minnesota | 0 | – | 8 | 1 | – | 11 |
$ – BCS representative as conference champion; % – BCS at-large representative; Rankings from AP Poll

The 2007 Indiana Hoosiers football team represented Indiana University Bloomington during the 2007 NCAA Division I FBS football season. The Hoosiers were coached by Bill Lynch, who was in his first season as head coach following the death of Terry Hoeppner. The Hoosiers played their home games at Memorial Stadium in Bloomington, Indiana. With a win over Purdue in the last game of the regular season, the Hoosiers became bowl eligible for the first time since 1993.

== Schedule ==
| Date | Time | Opponent | Site | TV | Result | Attendance | Source |
|---|---|---|---|---|---|---|---|
| September 1 | 8:00 p.m. | Indiana State* | Memorial Stadium; Bloomington, IN | BTN | W 55–7 | 34,715 | |
| September 8 | 8:00 p.m. | at Western Michigan* | Waldo Stadium; Kalamazoo, MI | ESPNU | W 37–27 | 32,129 | |
| September 15 | 12:00 p.m. | Akron* | Memorial Stadium; Bloomington, IN | BTN | W 41–24 | 31,196 | |
| September 22 | 12:00 p.m. | Illinois | Memorial Stadium; Bloomington, IN (rivalry) | BTN | L 14–27 | 34,707 | |
| September 29 | 12:00 p.m. | at Iowa | Kinnick Stadium; Iowa City, IA | BTN | W 38–20 | 70,585 | |
| October 6 | 12:00 p.m. | Minnesota | Memorial Stadium; Bloomington, IN | BTN | W 40–20 | 32,009 | |
| October 13 | 7:00 p.m. | at Michigan State | Spartan Stadium; East Lansing, MI (rivalry) | BTN | L 27–52 | 73,449 | |
| October 20 | 12:00 p.m. | Penn State^{†} | Memorial Stadium; Bloomington, IN | ESPN | L 31–36 | 41,251 | |
| October 27 | 12:00 p.m. | at Wisconsin | Camp Randall Stadium; Madison, WI | BTN | L 3–33 | 81,324 | |
| November 3 | 12:00 p.m. | Ball State* | Memorial Stadium; Bloomington, IN | BTN | W 38–20 | 34,406 | |
| November 10 | 11:00 a.m. | at Northwestern | Ryan Field; Evanston, IL | ESPNC | L 28–31 | 20,466 | |
| November 17 | 3:30 p.m. | Purdue | Memorial Stadium; Bloomington, IN (Old Oaken Bucket) | BTN | W 27–24 | 50,741 | |
| December 31 | 6:00 p.m. | vs. Oklahoma State | Sun Devil Stadium; Tempe, AZ (Insight Bowl) | NFLN | L 33–49 | 48,892 | |
*Non-conference game; ^{†}Homecoming; All times are in Eastern time

== 2008 NFL draftees ==
| Player | Round | Pick | Position | NFL club |
|---|---|---|---|---|
| Tracy Porter | 2 | 9 | Defensive back | New Orleans Saints |
| James Hardy | 2 | 10 | Wide receiver | Buffalo Bills |
