= 2007 Western Michigan Broncos football team =

American college football season

2007 Western Michigan Broncos football
- Conference: Mid-American Conference
- West
- Record: 5–7 (3–4 MAC)
- Head coach: Bill Cubit (3rd season)
- Offensive scheme: Multiple
- Defensive coordinator: Bill Miller (1st season)
- Base defense: 4–3
- Home stadium: Waldo Stadium (Capacity: 30,200)

2007 Mid-American Conference football standings
| | Div | | | Conf. | | | Overall |
| Team | W | | L | W | | L | W | | L |
|---|---|---|---|---|---|---|---|---|---|
East Division
| Miami (OH) xy | 4 | – | 2 | 5 | – | 2 | 6 | – | 7 |
| Bowling Green x | 4 | – | 2 | 6 | – | 2 | 8 | – | 5 |
| Buffalo x | 4 | – | 2 | 5 | – | 3 | 5 | – | 7 |
| Ohio | 3 | – | 3 | 4 | – | 4 | 6 | – | 6 |
| Temple | 3 | – | 3 | 4 | – | 4 | 4 | – | 8 |
| Akron | 2 | – | 4 | 3 | – | 5 | 4 | – | 8 |
| Kent State | 1 | – | 5 | 1 | – | 7 | 3 | – | 9 |
West Division
| Central Michigan xy$ | 4 | – | 1 | 6 | – | 1 | 8 | – | 6 |
| Ball State x | 4 | – | 1 | 5 | – | 2 | 7 | – | 6 |
| Eastern Michigan | 3 | – | 2 | 3 | – | 4 | 4 | – | 8 |
| Western Michigan | 2 | – | 3 | 3 | – | 4 | 5 | – | 7 |
| Toledo | 2 | – | 3 | 3 | – | 5 | 5 | – | 7 |
| Northern Illinois | 0 | – | 5 | 1 | – | 6 | 2 | – | 10 |
Championship: Central Michigan 35, Miami 10
$ – Conference champion; x – Division champion/co-champions; Due to an unbalanced conference schedule, the team with best division record within each division was awarded that division's championship game berth.

The 2007 Western Michigan Broncos football team represented Western Michigan University in the 2007 NCAA Division I FBS football season. The team was coached by Bill Cubit and played their homes game in Waldo Stadium in Kalamazoo, Michigan. The Broncos finished the season 5–7 overall and 3–4 in the Mid-American Conference. The highlight of the season was the 28–19 road victory over the Iowa Hawkeyes, a team that finished fifth in the Big Ten Conference .

== Preseason ==
The 2007 Bronco team returned 17 starters from an 8–5 team that finished 6–2 in the Mid-American Conference and participated in the 2007 International Bowl. While the team lost the bowl game 27–24, Western Michigan was picked to finish first in the MAC West Division and to win the MAC Championship Game by the MAC News Media Association.

=== Watch lists ===
- Robbie Krutilla, C, Outland Trophy
- Jim Laney, P, Ray Guy Award
- Branden Ledbetter, TE, John Mackey Award

=== All-MAC preseason teams ===
- First team
  - London Fryar, CB
  - Robbie Krutilla, C
  - Jamarko Simmons, WR
- Second team
  - Louis Delmas, FS
  - Branden Ledbetter, TE
  - Brandon West, RB

== Schedule ==
| Date | Time | Opponent | Site | TV | Result | Attendance | Source |
|---|---|---|---|---|---|---|---|
| September 1 | 3:30 pm | at No. 3 West Virginia* | Milan Puskar Stadium; Morgantown, WV | ESPN Plus | L 24–62 | 60,563 | |
| September 8 | 8:00 pm | Indiana* | Waldo Stadium; Kalamazoo, MI | ESPNU | L 27–37 | 32,129 | |
| September 15 | 2:00 pm | at Missouri* | Faurot Field; Columbia, MO | | L 24–52 | 53,480 | |
| September 22 | 7:00 pm | Central Connecticut State* | Waldo Stadium; Kalamazoo, MI | | W 51–14 | 15,718 | |
| September 29 | 7:00 pm | at Toledo | Glass Bowl; Toledo, OH | BCSN | W 42–28 | 18,542 | |
| October 6 | 7:00 pm | Akron | Waldo Stadium; Kalamazoo, MI | | L 38–39 | 25,610 | |
| October 13 | 4:00 pm | at Northern Illinois | Huskie Stadium; DeKalb, IL | CSNC | W 17–13 | 23,057 | |
| October 20 | 2:00 pm | Ball State^{†} | Waldo Stadium; Kalamazoo, MI | Comcast Local | L 23–27 | 17,892 | |
| October 27 | 3:30 pm | at Eastern Michigan | Rynearson Stadium; Ypsilanti, MI (Michigan MAC Trophy) | Comcast Local | L 2–19 | 7,002 | |
| November 6 | 7:30 pm | Central Michigan | Waldo Stadium; Kalamazoo, MI (WMU–CMU Rivalry Trophy, Michigan MAC Trophy) | ESPN2 | L 31–34 | 16,952 | |
| November 17 | 3:30 pm | at Iowa* | Kinnick Stadium; Iowa City, IA | BTN | W 28–19 | 70,585 | |
| November 24 | 2:00 pm | Temple | Waldo Stadium; Kalamazoo, MI | | W 16–3 | 8,662 | |
*Non-conference game; ^{†}Homecoming; Rankings from AP Poll released prior to the game; All times are in Eastern time

== Roster ==
| **Wide receiver**: 37 Brooks Bunbury - Freshman (redshirt); 35 Nick Davis - Freshman; 26 Kurt Ferrell - Freshman (redshirt); **11 Schneider Julien - Junior**; 5 Deshon Lawrence - Freshman; **7 Herb Martin - Senior**; 86 Kelly Martin - Senior (redshirt); 89 Kyle McDowell - Freshman; 4 Jamelle Murray - Freshman (redshirt); 81 Juan Nunez - Freshman; **27 Jamarko Simmons - Junior (redshirt)**; 43 Tyler VanZandt - Freshman (redshirt); 83 Jordan White - Freshman (redshirt); ~~36 Tyler Aldridge - Sophomore~~; **Center**: **78 Robbie Krutilla - Senior (redshirt)**; 63 Paul Wasikowski - Sophomore (redshirt); **Offensive guard**: 61 Nick Clemens - Freshman (redshirt); 60 Nick Mitchell - Freshman (redshirt); **65 Phillip Swanson - Freshman (redshirt)**; 64 Schyler Truesdell - Junior (redshirt); **62 Matt Williams - Senior**; **Offensive tackle**: **75 James Blair - Senior (redshirt)**; 76 Steve Ellingsen - Junior; 67 Rob Johnson - Junior (redshirt); **56 Andy Laue - Sophomore (redshirt)**; 77 Matt Lochmann - Sophomore (redshirt); 72 Anthony Parker - Freshman; **Offensive line**: 73 Josh Droppers - Freshman; 79 Jonathan Jack - Freshman; 58 Lee Pethan - Freshman; ~~52 Andrew Yuds - Freshman~~; **Tight end**: 42 Chad Baliko - Sophomore (redshirt); **82 Branden Ledbetter - Junior (redshirt)**; 88 Anthony Middleton - Freshman; 32 James O'Neill - Freshman (redshirt); 80 James Randall - Sophomore (redshirt); 87 Keith Schultz - Senior (redshirt); 84 Matt Stevens - Sophomore (redshirt); 85 Joel Workman - Freshman | **Quarterback**: 12 Robert Arnheim - Freshman; 18 Drew Burdi - Freshman (redshirt); 20 Caleb Clark - Sophomore (redshirt); **3 Tim Hiller - Sophomore (redshirt)**; 14 Thomas Peregrin - Senior; 10 Dennis Reedy - Junior (redshirt); **Tailback**: 34 Mark Bonds - Senior; 24 Bobby Crawford - Freshman (redshirt); 36 Jaron Deshazor - Freshman; 40 Kirk Elsworth - Junior; 22 Glenis Thompson - Sophomore; **2 Brandon West - Sophomore**; **Fullback**: 23 Nic Saad - Senior (redshirt); **Nose tackle**: 68 Cody Cielenski - Sophomore (redshirt); **98 Cory Flom - Junior (redshirt)**; **Defensive tackle**: 92 Kevin Cryille - Freshman; 55 Dezmond Gray - Senior (redshirt); 57 Jacoby Love - Freshman; 91 Grant Nemeth - Junior; 95 Chris Pyant - Freshman (redshirt); 93 John Russell - Junior; **99 Nick Varcadipane - Junior (redshirt)**; **Defensive end**: 94 Alvin Almicar - Freshman; 96 Mark Berghuis - Sophomore; 48 Justin Braska - Sophomore (redshirt); **90 Zach Davidson - Junior (redshirt)**; **54 Greg Marshall - Junior**; 97 Andrew Wersel - Freshman; 16 Anthony Williams - Freshman (redshirt) | **Cornerback**: **1 E. J. Biggers - Junior**; 28 Keith Dixson - Freshman; 15 Andy Dorcely - Sophomore; 6 **Londen Fryar** - Junior (redshirt); 25 David Lewis - Freshman; **46 Desman Stephen - Junior (redshirt)**; 30 Dervon Wallace - Freshman; **Linebacker**: 8 Darrell Copeland - Senior (redshirt); **59 Dustin Duclo - Junior (redshirt)**; 80 Fernand Kashama - Junior (redshirt); 41 Dan Krasinski - Sophomore (redshirt); **43 Boston McCornell - Junior**; 53 Matt Pickens - Freshman (redshirt); 51 Harrison Porter - Freshman; 35 Austin Pritchard - Junior; **19 Cornelius Robinson - Junior (redshirt)**; 50 Garrett Sosnovich - Junior; 45 Shaun Vernon - Freshman; 42 Mitch Vorick - Freshman; **Free safety**: **9 Louis Delmas - Junior**; 38 Anthony Gebhart - Senior (redshirt); **Strong safety**: 21 Antwain Allen - Senior (redshirt); 33 Mario Armstrong - Freshman; 29 Scott Gajos - Junior (redshirt); 31 Nick Hunter - Freshman; **26 C. J. Wilson - Junior (redshirt)**; 47 Jonathan Wright - Sophomore (redshirt); **Long snapper**: **69 Tom Harrington - Sophomore**; 71 Brian Bailey - Junior (redshirt); **Punter**: 37 Ben Armer - Freshman; 66 Tim Balice - Freshman (redshirt); **39 Jim Laney - Senior (redshirt)**; **Place kicker**: **17 Mike Jones - Senior (redshirt)**; 26 Caleb Morris - Freshman (redshirt); 41 Dylan VanFossen - Freshman |
Updated September 11, 2007; Sources: 2007 WMU Football Media Guide, WMUBroncos.com; Projected starters are in **bold**. Players who left the team are ~~struck out~~.

== Coaching staff ==
- Bill Cubit (Head coach)
- Bill Miller - Defensive coordinator
- Tim Daoust - Defensive secondary
- Grant Heard - Wide receivers
- Scott Kavanagh - Quarterbacks
- Peter McCarthy - Defensive line
- Jake Moreland - Tight ends
- Steve Morrison - Linebackers, recruiting coordinator
- Bob Stanley - Offensive line
- Chris Tabor - Running backs, special teams
- Tim Knox - Director of Football Operations
- Matt Ludeman - Defensive Graduate Assistant
- A. J. Ricker - Offensive Graduate Assistant

== Game summaries ==
=== West Virginia ===
| | 1 | 2 | 3 | 4 | Total |
|---|---|---|---|---|---|
| Broncos | 6 | 8 | 7 | 3 | 24 |
| Mountaineers | 14 | 14 | 21 | 13 | 62 |

Jamarko Simmons' 144 receiving yards on 14 catches with two touchdowns were not enough for Western Michigan to upset the #3 West Virginia Mountaineers. West Virginia nearly doubled WMU's offensive production (542 yards to 277 yards) and cruised to a 62–24 victory behind two passing touchdowns by Pat White and four touchdowns (three rushing) by Steve Slaton.

Recap | Boxscore | WMU pregame notes

=== Indiana ===
| | 1 | 2 | 3 | 4 | Total |
|---|---|---|---|---|---|
| Hoosiers | 10 | 21 | 3 | 3 | 37 |
| Broncos | 7 | 0 | 7 | 13 | 27 |

WMU is 0–3 all-time vs Indiana. The most recent meeting was in 2006 when the Hoosiers won 39–20. All three games have been in Bloomington, Indiana.

Recap | Boxscore | WMU pregame notes

=== Missouri ===
| | 1 | 2 | 3 | 4 | Total |
|---|---|---|---|---|---|
| Broncos | 0 | 3 | 7 | 14 | 24 |
| Tigers | 14 | 17 | 7 | 14 | 52 |

In 1999, Missouri beat the Broncos 48–34. That was the only meeting between the two schools.

Recap | Boxscore | WMU pregame notes

=== Central Connecticut State ===
| | 1 | 2 | 3 | 4 | Total |
|---|---|---|---|---|---|
| Blue Devils | 0 | 7 | 0 | 7 | 14 |
| Broncos | 17 | 14 | 6 | 14 | 51 |

Central Connecticut State is the only Division I Football Championship Subdivision team on WMU's schedule. This is the first ever meeting between the two schools.

Recap | Boxscore | WMU pregame notes

=== Toledo ===
| | 1 | 2 | 3 | 4 | Total |
|---|---|---|---|---|---|
| Broncos | 0 | 20 | 15 | 7 | 42 |
| Rockets | 7 | 7 | 7 | 7 | 28 |

This game is the Mid-American Conference conference opener for WMU. Western Michigan defeated Toledo 31–10 in 2006 for the first time since 2000. WMU has not won at the Glass Bowl since 1988 (31–9 victory). Toledo leads the all-time series 36–25.

Recap | Boxscore | WMU pregame notes

=== Akron ===
| | 1 | 2 | 3 | 4 | Total |
|---|---|---|---|---|---|
| Zips | 10 | 14 | 0 | 15 | 39 |
| Broncos | 10 | 7 | 14 | 7 | 38 |

After shutting out Akron last season 17–0, WMU leads the all-time series 11–3 (8–1 at Waldo Stadium).

Recap | Boxscore | WMU pregame notes

=== Northern Illinois ===
| | 1 | 2 | 3 | 4 | Total |
|---|---|---|---|---|---|
| Broncos | 3 | 7 | 7 | 0 | 17 |
| Huskies | 10 | 3 | 0 | 0 | 13 |

WMU leads the all-time series against Northern Illinois 20–11, including a 16–14 victory in 2006.

Recap | Boxscore | WMU pregame notes

=== Ball State ===
| | 1 | 2 | 3 | 4 | Total |
|---|---|---|---|---|---|
| Cardinals | 0 | 10 | 3 | 14 | 27 |
| Broncos | 3 | 10 | 0 | 10 | 23 |

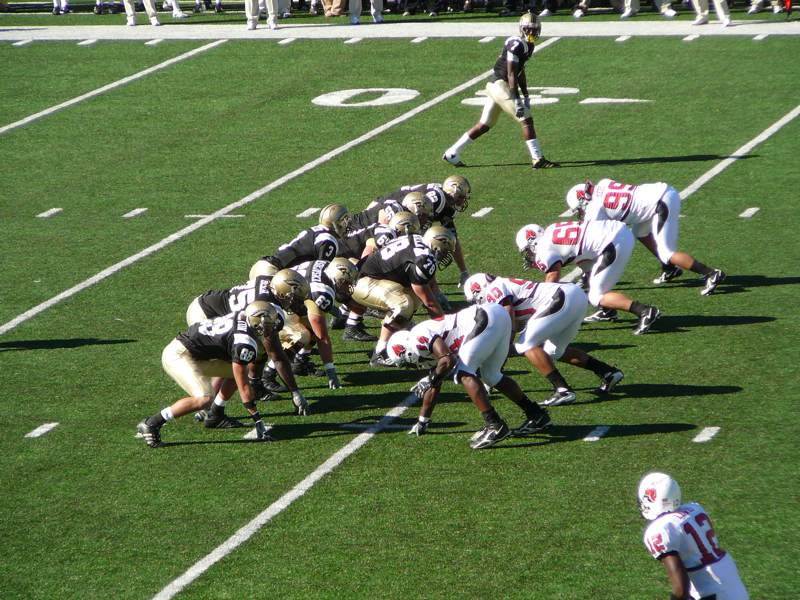
WMU with possession of the football vs. Ball State.

After losing to WMU 41–27 last season, Ball State went on to finish the season 3–1, with the lone loss being 34–26 against then-#2 ranked University of Michigan. WMU leads the all-time series 19–14. This game is WMU's Homecoming.

Recap | Boxscore | WMU pregame notes

=== Eastern Michigan ===
| | 1 | 2 | 3 | 4 | Total |
|---|---|---|---|---|---|
| Broncos | 2 | 0 | 0 | 0 | 2 |
| Eagles | 0 | 3 | 6 | 10 | 19 |

This game is the first of the 3 games that will determine the 2007 Michigan MAC Trophy winner (Central Michigan vs. WMU November 17 and CMU vs. Eastern Michigan November 17). Western leads the all-time series 26-14-2 and has not lost in Rynearson Stadium since 1991 (7 wins).

Recap | Boxscore | WMU pregame notes

=== Central Michigan ===
| | 1 | 2 | 3 | 4 | Total |
|---|---|---|---|---|---|
| Chippewas | 0 | 3 | 7 | 24 | 34 |
| Broncos | 7 | 0 | 0 | 24 | 31 |

In a nationally televised Tuesday night game, WMU leads the all-time series against CMU 43-32-2 and has not lost at home to Central Michigan since 1993 (6 wins).

Recap | Boxscore | WMU pregame notes

=== Iowa ===
| | 1 | 2 | 3 | 4 | Total |
|---|---|---|---|---|---|
| Broncos | 12 | 7 | 6 | 3 | 28 |
| Hawkeyes | 0 | 6 | 7 | 6 | 19 |

The final non-conference game of the season is the first between WMU and Iowa since WMU won 27–21 in 2000. That was the only meeting between the two schools.

Recap | Boxscore | WMU pregame notes

=== Temple ===
| | 1 | 2 | 3 | 4 | Total |
|---|---|---|---|---|---|
| Owls | 0 | 3 | 0 | 0 | 3 |
| Broncos | 0 | 6 | 10 | 0 | 16 |

WMU defeated Temple 41–7 last season in a year when Temple finished the season 1–11. WMU has never lost against Temple and leads the series 5–0.

Recap | Boxscore | WMU pregame notes

== Awards ==
=== Mid-American Conference Player of the Week ===
- Offense
  - Mark Bonds, RB, week 5 (26 car, 143 yds, 2 TD, 1 rec vs. Toledo)
  - Tim Hiller, QB, week 12 (26–45, 367 yds, 3 TD, 0 INT vs. Iowa)
  - Jamarko Simmons, WR, week 1 (14 rec, 144 yds, 2 TD vs. West Virginia)
- Defense
  - Dustin Duclo, LB, week 7 (10 tackles, 2 fumble recoveries vs. Northern Illinois)
  - Austin Pritchard, LB, week 1 (11 tackles vs. West Virginia)
- Special Teams
  - Mike Jones, PK, week 7 (21 yard field goal, 2 punts inside 20-yard line vs. Northern Illinois)
  - Jim Laney, P (2), week 1 (50.7 avg, 3 inside 20 vs. West Virginia), week 13 (40.2 avg, 2 inside 20, long punt of 57 yds vs. Temple)
  - Brandon West, KR, RB (3), week 2 (5 ret, 212 yds, 42.4 avg, TD vs. Indiana), week 6 (5 ret, 120 yds, 24.0 avg vs. Akron), week 12 (30 car, 116 yds, 9 rec, 93 yds, 4 ret, 82 yds vs. Iowa)

=== Mid-American Conference Scholar-Athlete of the Week ===
- Tim Hiller, QB (3), week 2, week 6, week 12

=== Academic All-District ===
- Anthony Gebhart, S, First Team ESPN The Magazine Academic All-District IV

=== John Mackey Tight End of the Week ===
- Branden Ledbetter, TE, week 11 (5 rec, 124 yds, TD vs. Central Michigan)

== Statistics ==
=== Team ===
| | Team | Opp |
|---|---|---|
| Scoring | 223 | 245 |
| Points per game | 31.9 | 35.0 |
| First downs | 157 | 144 |
| Rushing | 59 | 70 |
| Passing | 91 | 60 |
| Penalty | 7 | 14 |
| Total offense | 2799 | 3042 |
| Avg per play | 5.0 | 6.1 |
| Avg per game | 399.9 | 434.6 |
| Fumbles-Lost | 12–9 | 24–11 |
| Penalties-Yards | 65-529 | 44-378 |
| Avg per game | 75.6 | 54.0 |

| | Team | Opp |
|---|---|---|
| Punts-Average | 35–43.8 | 28–41.1 |
| Time of possession/Game | 32:18 | 27:42 |
| 3rd down conversions | 45/113 40% | 48/105 46% |
| 4th down conversions | 10/18 56% | 4/12 33% |
| Touchdowns scored | 30 | 32 |
| Field goals/Attempts | 5/6 | 7/11 |
| PAT/Attempts | 24/27 | 30/31 |
| Attendance | 73,457 | 155,642 |
| Games/Avg per Game | 24,486 | 38,910 |

=== Offense ===
==== Rushing ====
| Player | Att | Yards | Yds/Att | TD | Yds/Game |
|---|---|---|---|---|---|
| Mark Bonds | 109 | 492 | 4.5 | 6 | 70.3 |
| Brandon West | 101 | 461 | 4.1 | 3 | 58.6 |
| Glenis Thompson | 24 | 88 | 3.7 | 1 | 12.6 |
| Schneider Julien | 3 | 11 | 3.7 | 0 | 1.6 |
| Herb Martin | 1 | 8 | 8.0 | 0 | 1.1 |
| Bobby Crawford | 3 | 6 | 2.0 | 0 | 6.0 |
| Thomas Peregrin | 5 | 1 | 0.2 | 0 | 0.3 |
| Jamarko Simmons | 3 | −8 | −2.7 | 0 | −1.1 |
| Drew Burdi | 3 | −11 | −3.7 | 0 | −5.5 |
| Tim Hiller | 30 | −48 | −1.6 | 1 | −6.9 |

==== Passing ====
| Player | Cmp | Att | Pct | Yds | TD | Int | Avg | Rating |
|---|---|---|---|---|---|---|---|---|
| Tim Hiller | 159 | 244 | 65.2 | 1713 | 13 | 8 | 244.7 | 135.16 |
| Thomas Peregrin | 15 | 24 | 62.5 | 129 | 1 | 1 | 32.2 | 113.07 |
| Drew Burdi | 2 | 3 | 18 | 66.7 | 1 | 0 | 9.0 | 227.07 |
| Herb Martin | 1 | 1 | 100.0 | 14 | 1 | 0 | 2.0 | 547.60 |

==== Receiving ====
| Player | Rec | Yds | Yds/Rec | TD | Yds/G |
|---|---|---|---|---|---|
| Jamarko Simmons | 60 | 696 | 11.6 | 6 | 99.4 |
| Branden Ledbetter | 27 | 308 | 11.4 | 4 | 44.0 |
| Brandon West | 25 | 213 | 8.5 | 1 | 30.4 |
| Herb Martin | 21 | 251 | 12.0 | 1 | 35.9 |
| Juan Nunez | 10 | 169 | 16.9 | 1 | 24.1 |
| Mark Bonds | 8 | 34 | 4.2 | 0 | 4.9 |
| Schneider Julien | 7 | 49 | 7.0 | 0 | 7.0 |
| Anthony Middleton | 5 | 46 | 9.2 | 1 | 6.6 |
| Keith Schultz | 5 | 34 | 6.8 | 1 | 4.9 |
| Jordan White | 4 | 33 | 8.2 | 0 | 8.2 |
| Jamelle Murray | 3 | 27 | 9.0 | 1 | 6.8 |
| Glenis Thompson | 1 | 8 | 8.0 | 0 | 1.1 |
| Kelly Martin | 1 | 6 | 6.0 | 0 | 3.0 |

=== Defense ===
==== Tackles ====
| Player | Solo | Ast | Total | TFL | Sacks | Fumble force | Fumble rec |
|---|---|---|---|---|---|---|---|
| Anthony Gebhart | 15 | 16 | 31 | 1 | 0 | 0 | 0 |
| C.J. Wilson | 10 | 16 | 26 | 1/2 | 0 | 1 | 0 |
| Dustin Duclo | 13 | 12 | 25 | 2 | 0 | 0 | 0 |
| Boston McCornell | 8 | 15 | 23 | 2 | 1/2 | 1 | 0 |
| Londen Fryar | 15 | 11 | 26 | 0 | 0 | 0 | 0 |
| E. J. Biggers | 12 | 4 | 16 | 1 | 0 | 1 | 1 |
| Zach Davidson | 6 | 9 | 15 | 4 1/2 | 1 1/2 | 0 | 0 |
| Nick Varcadipane | 3 | 9 | 12 | 1 | 0 | 0 | 0 |
| Austin Pritchard | 5 | 6 | 11 | 0 | 0 | 0 | 0 |
| Mark Berghuis | 4 | 4 | 8 | 1 1/2 | 1/2 | 1 | 0 |
| Justin Braska | 3 | 5 | 8 | 1/2 | 1/2 | 0 | 0 |
| Cody Cielenski | 4 | 4 | 8 | 2 | 1/2 | 0 | 0 |
| Greg Marshall | 2 | 6 | 8 | 1 1/2 | 1/2 | 0 | 0 |
| Andy Dorcely | 5 | 2 | 7 | 0 | 0 | 0 | 0 |
| Cory Flom | 1 | 6 | 7 | 1/2 | 0 | 0 | 0 |
| Harrison Porter | 1 | 6 | 7 | 0 | 0 | 0 | 0 |
| Desman Stephen | 2 | 3 | 5 | 0 | 0 | 0 | 0 |
| Cornelius Robinson | 1 | 3 | 4 | 0 | 0 | 0 | 0 |
| Mario Armstrong | 3 | 1 | 4 | 0 | 0 | 0 | 0 |
| Matt Pickens | 1 | 2 | 3 | 0 | 0 | 0 | 0 |
| Scott Gajos | 2 | 1 | 3 | 0 | 0 | 0 | 0 |
| Grant Nemeth | 0 | 3 | 3 | 0 | 0 | 0 | 0 |
| Garrett Sosnovich | 1 | 2 | 3 | 0 | 0 | 0 | 0 |
| Fernand Kashama | 1 | 1 | 2 | 0 | 0 | 0 | 0 |
| Louis Delmas | 1 | 1 | 2 | 0 | 0 | 0 | 0 |
| Brandon West | 2 | 0 | 2 | 0 | 0 | 0 | 0 |
| Antwain Allen | 0 | 1 | 1 | 0 | 0 | 0 | 0 |
| Nic Saad | 0 | 1 | 1 | 0 | 0 | 0 | 0 |
| Herb Martin | 1 | 0 | 1 | 0 | 0 | 0 | 0 |
| Mike Jones | 1 | 0 | 1 | 0 | 0 | 0 | 0 |
| Glenis Thompson | 1 | 0 | 1 | 0 | 0 | 0 | 0 |
| Phillip Thompson | 1 | 0 | 1 | 0 | 0 | 0 | 0 |
| Jim Laney | 1 | 0 | 1 | 0 | 0 | 0 | 0 |
| Phillip Swanson | 1 | 0 | 1 | 0 | 0 | 0 | 0 |
| Kirk Elsworth | 1 | 0 | 1 | 0 | 0 | 0 | 0 |
| Tom Harrington | 0 | 0 | 0 | 0 | 0 | 0 | 1 |

==== Interceptions ====
| Player | Int | Yds | Break Up |
|---|---|---|---|
| Anthony Gebhart | 1 | 24 | 2 |
| C.J. Wilson | 1 | 46 | 1 |
| Andy Dorcely | 1 | 5 | 1 |
| E. J. Biggers | 0 | 0 | 3 |
| Londen Fryar | 6 | 167 | 24 |
| Nick Varcadipane | 0 | 0 | 2 |
| Dustin Duclo | 0 | 0 | 2 |
| Cory Flom | 0 | 0 | 1 |
| Garrett Sosnovich | 0 | 0 | 1 |

== See also ==
- 2007–08 Mid-American Conference season
