= 2007–08 Mid-American Conference season =

Mid-American Conference
- Mid-American Conference

Data
Classification	NCAA Division I FBS
Established	1946
Members	12
Sports fielded	23 (11 men's, 12 women's)
Region	Great Lakes
States	5 – Illinois, Indiana, Michigan, New York, Ohio
Headquarters	Cleveland, Ohio

Locations
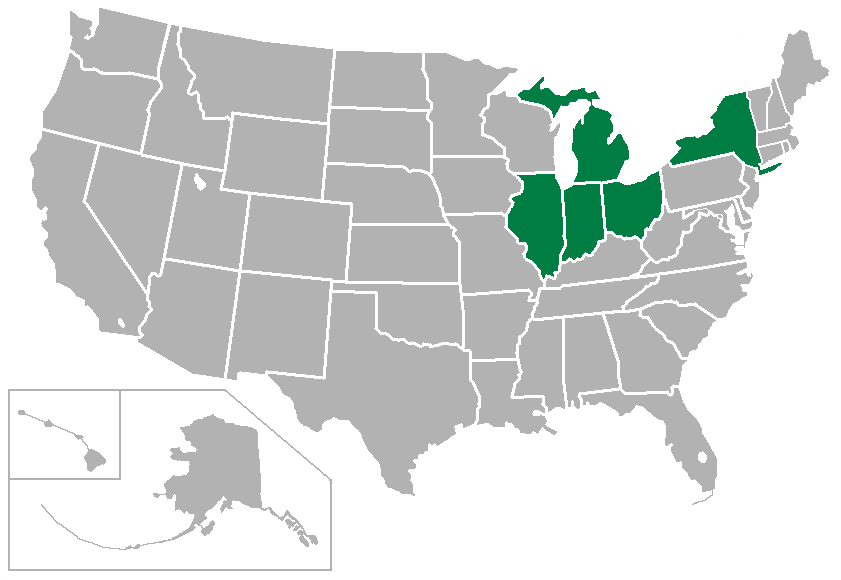

The 2007–08 Mid-American Conference season was its 62nd season in existence. The Mid-American Conference (MAC) competed at Division I in the National Collegiate Athletic Association. It sponsored 23 sports (11 men's and 12 women's).

== Teams ==
Institution	Nickname	Location	Founded	Affiliation	Enrollment
East Division
University of Akron	Zips	Akron, Ohio	1870	Public	24,704
Bowling Green State University	Falcons	Bowling Green, Ohio	1910	Public	22,882
University at Buffalo	Bulls	Buffalo, New York	1846	Public	28,054
Kent State University	Golden Flashes	Kent, Ohio	1910	Public	34,056
Miami University	RedHawks	Oxford, Ohio	1809	Public	20,126
Ohio University	Bobcats	Athens, Ohio	1804	Public	20,437
West Division
Ball State University	Cardinals	Muncie, Indiana	1918	Public	20,113
Central Michigan University	Chippewas	Mount Pleasant, Michigan	1892	Public	26,788
Eastern Michigan University	Eagles	Ypsilanti, Michigan	1849	Public	22,974
Northern Illinois University	Huskies	DeKalb, Illinois	1895	Public	25,313
University of Toledo	Rockets	Toledo, Ohio	1872	Public	19,706
Western Michigan University	Broncos	Kalamazoo, Michigan	1903	Public	24,433

Four schools have affiliate membership status:

Institution	Nickname	Location	Founded	Affiliation	Enrollment	Sport
Chicago State University	Cougars	Chicago, Illinois	1867	Public	7,131	Men's tennis
Hartwick College	Hawks	Oneonta, New York	1797	Private	1,520	Men's soccer
Missouri State University	Lady Bears	Springfield, Missouri	1905	Public	17,425	Field hockey
Temple University	Owls	Philadelphia, Pennsylvania	1884	Public	34,218	Football

== Reese and Jacoby trophies ==
The Reese and Jacoby trophies are awarded to the top men's and women's athletic departments in the Mid-American Conference.

Points are awarded based on each school's finish, with the overall total divided by the number of sports sponsored by each school. An institution may count either indoor track and field or outdoor track and field but not both.

=== Reese standings ===
Institution	BB	BKB	CC	FB	Golf	Soc	Sw	Ten	TFI	TFO	W	No. Sports	Total	Avg
Eastern Michigan	10½	7	12½	5½	12½	-	11	-	12	~~10~~	6	8	77	9.6
Kent State	12½	13	6	1	11½	-	-	-	7	~~8~~	10	7	61	8.7
Central Michigan	6	7	9	13	-	-	-	-	3	~~4~~	12	6	50	8.3
Akron	3½	10½	7	3½	7	12	-	-	~~9~~	12	-	7	55½	7.9
Miami	2	9	11½	10½	6	-	8½	-	-	6	-	7	53½	7.6
Western Michigan	6	12	-	5½	-	2	-	12	-	-	-	5	37½	7.5
Ball State	8½	3½	-	10½	9	-	2½	10	-	-	-	6	44	7.3
Bowling Green	12½	4½	2½	12	2½	6	-	-	-	-	-	6	40	6.7
Ohio	7½	9	8	7½	5	-	-	-	-	-	2	6	39	6.5
Toledo	4½	5½	1	3½	8	-	-	8	-	-	-	6	30½	5.1
NIU	9½	2	-	2	1	4	-	6	-	-	8	7	32½	4.6
Buffalo	1	1	5	9	-	9	5½	2	3	~~2~~	4	9	39½	4.4
Hartwick *	-	-	-	-	-	8	-	-	-	-	-	1	8	8.0
Temple *	-	-	-	7½	-	-	-	-	-	-	-	1	7½	7.5
Chicago State *	-	-	-	-	-	-	-	4	-	-	-	1	4	4.0

* Affiliate status only. Does not qualify for trophy.

=== Jacoby standings ===
Institution	BKB	CC	FH	Golf	Gym	SB	Soc	Sw	Ten	TFI	TFO	VB	No. Sports	Total	Avg
Miami	12	10½	8	-	-	9½	5	8	11½	10½	~~10½~~	12	9	87	9.7
Ohio	8½	13	12	5	-	7½	7½	12½	-	~~3½~~	6½	13	9	85½	9.5
Kent State	3½	4½	10	12½	12	13	6½	-	-	~~5½~~	9½	8½	9	80	8.9
Western Michigan	7½	5½	-	8	5	8½	1½	-	12½	12	~~12~~	10	9	70½	7.8
Eastern Michigan	10	2	-	11	11	3½	9	9	8½	6½	~~4~~	6½	10	77	7.7
Toledo	4½	9½	-	9	-	1	12	11	8½	~~4½~~	5½	1½	9	62½	6.9
Central Michigan	2	7½	6	-	9	10½	3½	-	-	8½	~~8½~~	7½	8	54½	6.8
Bowling Green	13	6½	-	1½	2	12	9	5	6½	2	~~2~~	10	10	67½	6.8
Ball State	10	8½	4	6	3	6½	13	1½	5	9½	~~4~~	4½	11	71½	6.5
Akron	1	12	-	-	-	5½	1½	3	1	13	~~13~~	3½	8	40½	5.1
Buffalo	6½	3½	-	-	-	2	5	6	6½	7½	~~7½~~	1½	8	38½	4.8
NIU	5½	1	-	3	7	4½	10½	-	2½	1	~~1~~	5½	9	40½	4.5
Missouri State *	-	-	2	-	-	-	-	-	-	-	-	-	1	2	2.0

* Affiliate status only. Does not qualify for trophy.

== Sports ==
=== Baseball ===
The 2008 baseball season begins in February 2008 and concludes with the NCAA tournament in June 2008. Kent State is the defending East division and conference tournament champion and finished 0–2 in the 2007 NCAA baseball tournament. Eastern Michigan won the MAC West division.

==== Standings ====
===== East =====
Seed	Team	Conference				Overall		
Seed	Team	W	L	Pct.	GB	W	L	Pct.
1	Kent State	16	8	.667	–	36	21	.632
3	Bowling Green	16	8	.667	–	32	20	.615
6	Ohio	14	13	.519	3½	29	30	.492
–	Akron	8	13	.381	6½	25	24	.510
–	Miami	8	19	.296	9½	18	36	.333
–	Buffalo	7	19	.269	10	14	38	.269

===== West =====
Seed	Team	Conference				Overall		
Seed	Team	W	L	Pct.	GB	W	L	Pct.
2	Eastern Michigan	15	8	.652	–	25	32	.439
4	NIU	16	10	.615	½	29	25	.537
5	Ball State	12	11	.522	3	27	26	.509
7	Western Michigan	12	12	.500	3½	29	23	.558
8	Central Michigan	13	13	.500	3½	29	27	.518
–	Toledo	10	13	.435	5	17	30	.362

=== Basketball (men's) ===
The 2007-08 men's basketball season begins in November 2007 and concludes with the NCAA tournament in March 2008. Miami won the 2007 conference tournament, defeating East division champion Akron in the finals. Miami was seeded 14th in the 2007 NCAA Men's Division I Basketball tournament and lost to 3rd seed Oregon in the first round. Toledo is the defending West division champion.

Kent State was picked by the MAC News Media Association to win the East Division and Western Michigan was picked to win the West Division. Kent State was picked to win the MAC Tournament.

==== Standings ====
2007–08 Mid-American Conference men's basketball standings
	Conf.				Overall
Team	W		L	PCT	W		L	PCT
East
Kent State †	13	–	3	.813	28	–	7	.800
Akron	11	–	5	.688	24	–	11	.686
Ohio	9	–	7	.563	20	–	13	.606
Miami (OH)	9	–	7	.563	17	–	16	.515
Bowling Green	7	–	9	.438	13	–	16	.448
Buffalo	3	–	13	.188	10	–	20	.333
West
Western Michigan	12	–	4	.750	20	–	12	.625
Central Michigan	8	–	8	.500	14	–	17	.452
Eastern Michigan	8	–	8	.500	14	–	17	.452
Toledo	7	–	8	.467	11	–	19	.367
Ball State	5	–	11	.313	6	–	24	.200
Northern Illinois	3	–	12	.200	6	–	22	.214
† 2008 MAC tournament winner Rankings from AP Poll

==== Players of the week ====
The following are the MAC men's basketball players of the week. Number of awards won this season are in parentheses.

Week	Division	Player	School
November 12	East	Chris Knight	Bowling Green
November 12	West	Derek Drews	Western Michigan
November 19	East	Tim Pollitz	Miami
November 19	West	Joe Reitz	Western Michigan
November 26	East	Michael Bramos	Miami
November 26	West	Justin Dobbins	Eastern Michigan
December 3	East	Cedrick Middleton	Akron
December 3	West	Tyrone Kent	Toledo
December 10	East	Al Fisher	Kent State
December 10	West	Giordan Watson	Central Michigan
December 17	East	Nate Linhart	Akron
December 17	West	Giordan Watson (2)	Central Michigan
December 24	East	Tim Pollitz (2)	Miami
December 24	West	Joe Reitz (2)	Western Michigan
December 31	East	Al Fisher (2)	Kent State
December 31	West	Shaun Logan	NIU
January 7	East	Haminn Quaintance	Kent State
January 7	West	Peyton Stovall	Ball State

Week	Division	Player	School
January 14	East	Jerome Tillman	Ohio
January 14	West	Anthony Newell	Ball State
January 21	East	Jerome Tillman (2)	Ohio
January 21	West	Giordan Watson (3)	Central Michigan
January 28	East	Leon Williams	Ohio
January 28	West	David Kool	Western Michigan
February 4	East	Kenny Hayes	Miami
February 4	West	Joe Reitz (3)	Western Michigan
February 11	East	Andy Robinson	Buffalo
February 11	West	Joe Reitz (4)	Western Michigan
February 18	East	Al Fisher (3)	Kent State
February 18	West	Darion Anderson	NIU
February 25	East	Al Fisher (4)	Kent State
February 25	West	David Kool (2)	Western Michigan
March 3	East	Michael Bramos (2); Joe Jakubowski	Miami; Bowling Green
March 3	West	David Kool (3)	Western Michigan

=== Basketball (women's) ===
The 2007-08 women's basketball season begins in November 2007 and concludes with the NCAA tournament in March 2008. East division champion Bowling Green defeated West champion Ball State in the finals of the conference tournament. Bowling Green, which entered the 2007 NCAA Women's Division I Basketball tournament ranked 18th and 20th in the USA Today Coaches Poll and Associated Press Poll, respectively, was seeded 7th and advanced to the Sweet Sixteen, defeating 10th seeded Oklahoma State and 2nd seeded Vanderbilt along the way.

==== Standings ====
===== East =====
Seed	Team	Conference				Overall		
Seed	Team	W	L	Pct.	GB	W	L	Pct.
E1	Bowling Green	13	3	.813	–	26	8	.765
E2	Miami	12	4	.750	1	23	11	.676
E3	Ohio	10	6	.625	3	20	13	.606
E4	Buffalo	8	8	.500	5	15	15	.500
E5	Kent State	5	11	.313	8	9	21	.300
E6	Akron	2	14	.125	11	7	24	.226

===== West =====
Seed	Team	Conference				Overall		
Seed	Team	W	L	Pct.	GB	W	L	Pct.
W1	Ball State *	11	5	.688	–	15	15	.500
W2	Eastern Michigan	11	5	.688	–	17	12	.586
W3	Western Michigan	9	7	.563	2	13	19	.406
W4	NIU	6	8	.429	4	10	18	.357
W5	Toledo	5	10	.333	5½	14	16	.467
W6	Central Michigan	2	13	.133	8½	6	23	.207

* Received W1 seed based on 2-0 head-to-head record vs. Eastern Michigan.

==== Tournament ====
First Round; Sun/Mon, March 9/10
E4	Buffalo	50
W5	Toledo	53
W3	Western Michigan	84
E6	Akron	54
W4	NIU	67
E5	Kent	75
E3	Ohio	68
W6	Central Michigan	65

Quarterfinals; Tuesday, March 11
W1	Ball State	60
W5	Toledo	65
E2	Miami	65
W3	Western Michigan	60
E1	Bowling Green	76
E5	Kent	62
W2	Eastern Michigan	62
E3	Ohio	76

Semifinals; Friday, March 14
W5	Toledo	66
E2	Miami	70
E1	Bowling Green	66
E3	Ohio	68 *

Final; Saturday, March 15
E2	Miami	67
E3	Ohio	56

* double overtime

==== Players of the week ====
The following are the MAC women's basketball players of the week. Number of awards won this season are in parentheses.

Week	Division	Player	School
November 12	East	Lindsay Goldsberry	Bowling Green
November 12	West	Tiera DeLaHoussaye	Western Michigan
November 19	East	Kate Achter; Amanda Jackson	Bowling Green; Miami
November 19	West	Alyssa Pittman	Eastern Michigan
November 26	East	Kate Achter (2)	Bowling Green
November 26	West	Julie DeMuth	Ball State
December 3	East	Amanda Jackson (2)	Miami
December 3	West	Latisha Luckett	Central Michigan
December 10	East	Sarah Tokodi	Akron
December 10	West	Canea Williams	Eastern Michigan
December 17	East	Sarah Tokodi (2)	Akron
December 17	West	Tiera DeLaHoussaye (2)	Western Michigan
December 24	East	Anna Kowalska	Kent State
December 24	West	Allie Clifton	Toledo
December 31	East	Amanda Jackson (3)	Miami
December 31	West	Tiera DeLaHoussaye (3)	Western Michigan
January 7	East	Amanda Jackson (4)	Miami
January 7	West	Tiera DeLaHoussaye (4)	Western Michigan

Week	Division	Player	School
January 14	East	Anna Kowalska (2)	Kent State
January 14	West	Emily Maggert	Ball State
January 21	East	Jennifer Bushby	Ohio
January 21	West	Amanda Parker	Western Michigan
January 28	East	Lauren Kohn	Ohio
January 28	West	Kiley Jarrett	Ball State
February 4	East	Lauren Kohn (2)	Ohio
February 4	West	Tiera DeLaHoussaye (5)	Western Michigan
February 11	East	Tara Breske	Bowling Green
February 11	West	Angel Chan	Central Michigan
February 18	East	Chenel Harris	Kent State
February 18	West	Colleen Russell	Eastern Michigan
February 25	East	Kate Achter (2)	Bowling Green
February 25	West	Tiera DeLaHoussaye (6)	Western Michigan
March 3	East	Kate Achter (3)	Bowling Green
March 3	West	Audrey McDonald	Ball State
March 7	East	Laura Markwood	Miami
March 7	West	Porchia Green	Ball State

=== Cross country (men's) ===
The 2007 men's cross country season began in August 2007 and concluded with the NCAA Men's Cross Country Championship in November 2007. Eastern Michigan won the team championship, placing three runners in the top 5. Miami was the runner up. Josh Perrin of EMU won the individual championship. The win was EMU's third consecutive team championship.

Nine of the ten MAC teams competed in the NCAA Great Lakes Regional. Eastern Michigan finished 7th, followed by Miami (9th), Kent State (10th), Central Michigan (12th), Ohio (14th), Akron (18th), Toledo (29th). Bowling Green did not place. Buffalo competed in the Northeast Regional and finished 18th. No teams qualified to compete in the NCAA Cross Country Championships.

Josh Karanja (Eastern Michigan), Craig Leon (Ohio) and Pat Sovacool (Miami) qualified for the individual championship. Leon finished 106th, Sovacool 135th and Karanja 150th.

==== Champions ====
- Team: Eastern Michigan
- Individual: Josh Perrin, Eastern Michigan (24:33)

==== MAC Championship results ====
1. Eastern Michigan, 31 points
2. Miami, 50
3. Central Michigan, 98
4. Ohio, 116
5. Akron, 120
6. Kent State, 130
7. Buffalo, 180
8. Bowling Green, 241
9. Toledo, 258

==== Players of the week ====
Week	Player	School
September 4	Pat Sovacool	Miami
September 11	Pat Sovacool	Miami
September 18	Aiman Scullion	Kent State
September 25	Josh Karanja	Eastern Michigan

Week	Player	School
October 2	Josh Karanja	Eastern Michigan
October 9	Craig Leon	Ohio
October 16	Pat Sovacool	Miami
October 23	Matt Hammersmith	Eastern Michigan

=== Cross country (women's) ===
The 2007 women's cross country season began in August 2007 and concludes with the NCAA Women's Cross Country Championship in November 2007. Ohio won its second team championship in as many years. Laura Neufarth of Miami won the individual championship.

==== Champions ====
- Team: Ohio
- Individual: Laura Neufarth, Miami (17:35)

==== MAC Championship results ====
1. Ohio, 56 points
2. Akron, 58
3. Miami, 77
4. Toledo, 89
5. Ball State, 135
6. Central Michigan, 174
7. Bowling Green, 218
8. Western Michigan, 224
9. Kent State, 230
10. Buffalo, 232
11. Eastern Michigan, 286
12. NIU, 289

==== Players of the week ====
Week	Player	School
September 4	Ashley Fischer	Bowling Green
September 11	Laura Neufarth	Miami
September 18	Laura Neufarth	Miami
September 25	Kelly McClure	Central Michigan

Week	Player	School
October 2	Kari Summers	Ohio
October 9	Laura Neufarth	Miami
October 16	Ali Bishel	Ball State
October 23	Ari Fisher	Toledo

=== Field hockey ===
Ohio captured the Mid-American Conference regular season championship, finishing 2 games better than second place Kent State. Ohio also won the MAC tournament championship, defeating Miami 3–2 in overtime. The victory marked the first time an Ohio field hockey team has won the regular season and tournament championships two years in a row. Ohio was ranked 15 in the final STX/NFHCA Division I National Coaches Poll.

Ohio defeated American University 3–2 in the NCAA Women's Field Hockey Championship Opening Round game. Ohio lost to #6 ranked Michigan Wolverines 1–0 in overtime in the First Round of the tournament.

==== Tournament ====
The conference tournament took place November 1 through November 3 in Oxford, OH.

November 1 Oxford, OH
4	Central Michigan	1
5	Ball State	0
3	Miami	3
6	Missouri State	1

November 2 Oxford, OH
1	Ohio	3
4	Central Michigan	0
2	Kent State	2
3	Miami	3

November 3 Oxford, OH
1	Ohio	3
3	Miami	2

===== All-tournament team =====
- Torrie Albini, F, Ohio
- Taylor Florence, F, Miami
- Danielle Gaynor, MF, Miami
- Louise Gerike, GK, Central Michigan
- Nikki Gnozzio, D, Ohio
- Jessie Martin, GK, Ohio
- Anna McComb, MF, Kent State
- Rachel Miller, F, Kent State
- Alyssa Nye, F, Miami
- Kim Sihota, MF, Central Michigan

==== Standings ====
Team	Conference				Overall		
Team	W	L	Pct.	GB	W	L	Pct.
Ohio	9	1	.900	-	15	4	.789
Kent State	7	3	.700	2	12	8	.600
Miami	6	4	.600	3	8	10	.444
Central Michigan	4	6	.400	5	5	13	.278
Ball State	3	7	.300	6	5	12	.294
Missouri State	1	9	.100	8	2	18	.100

==== Players of the week ====
Week	Team	Player	School
August 28	Offense	Torrie Albini	Ohio
August 28	Defense	Jessie Martin	Ohio
September 4	Offense	Rachel Miller	Kent State
September 4	Defense	Nikki Gnozzio	Ohio
September 11	Offense	Torrie Albini	Ohio
September 11	Defense	Jessie Martin	Ohio
September 18	Offense	Marcy Dull	Ohio
September 18	Defense	Jessie Martin	Ohio
September 25	Offense	Brooke MacGillivary	Ball State
September 25	Defense	Kara Copeland; Jessie Martin	Kent State; Ohio

Week	Team	Player	School
October 3	Offense	Moyra Betuzzi	Central Michigan
October 3	Defense	Louise Gericke	Central Michigan
October 10	Offense	Brooke MacGillivary	Ball State
October 10	Defense	Jessie Martin	Ohio
October 17	Offense	Brooke MacGillivary	Ball State
October 17	Defense	Nina Bruno	Ohio
October 23	Offense	Alyssa Nye	Miami
October 23	Defense	Tiffany Shifflett	Ball State
October 30	Offense	Laurie Wilkins	Kent State
October 30	Defense	Kim Kinsella	Missouri State

==== Awards ====
- Player of the Year: Jessie Martin, Ohio
- Coach of the Year: Kathleen Schanne, Kent State
- Freshman of the Year: Rachel Miller, Kent State
- All MAC, First Team
  - Rachelle Coetzee, Ohio, Midfielder, Senior
  - Lauren Cruz, Ball State, Midfielder, Senior
  - Kim Erasmus, Central Michigan, Midfielder, Sophomore
  - Taylor Florence, Miami, Forward, Senior
  - Nikki Gnozzio, Ohio, Forward, Sophomore
  - Sarah Johnson, Missouri State, Defense, Junior
  - Brooke MacGillivary, Ball State, Forward, Sophomore
  - Jessie Martin, Ohio, Goalkeeper, Junior
  - Rachel Miller, Kent State, Forward, Freshman
  - Charlotte Muller, Kent State, Midfielder, Senior
  - Alyssa Nye, Miami, Forward, Senior

=== Football ===
2007 Mid-American Conference football standings
	Div			Conf.			Overall
Team	W		L	W		L	W		L
East Division
Miami (OH) xy	4	–	2	5	–	2	6	–	7
Bowling Green x	4	–	2	6	–	2	8	–	5
Buffalo x	4	–	2	5	–	3	5	–	7
Ohio	3	–	3	4	–	4	6	–	6
Temple	3	–	3	4	–	4	4	–	8
Akron	2	–	4	3	–	5	4	–	8
Kent State	1	–	5	1	–	7	3	–	9
West Division
Central Michigan xy$	4	–	1	6	–	1	8	–	6
Ball State x	4	–	1	5	–	2	7	–	6
Eastern Michigan	3	–	2	3	–	4	4	–	8
Western Michigan	2	–	3	3	–	4	5	–	7
Toledo	2	–	3	3	–	5	5	–	7
Northern Illinois	0	–	5	1	–	6	2	–	10
Championship: Central Michigan 35, Miami 10
$ – Conference champion; x – Division champion/co-champions; Due to an unbalanced conference schedule, the team with best division record within each division was awarded that division's championship game berth.

The 2007 MAC football season began in August 2007 and concludes with the 2008 GMAC Bowl on January 6, 2008.

==== Players of the week ====
Week	Division	Team	Player	School
September 1	East	Offensive	Tyler Sheehan	Bowling Green
September 1	East	Defensive	Reggie Corner	Akron
September 1	East	Special Teams	Joshua Abrams	Ohio
September 1	West	Offensive	Jamarko Simmons	Western Michigan
September 1	West	Defensive	Austin Pritchard	Western Michigan
September 1	West	Special Teams	Brett Kern; Jim Laney	Toledo; Western Michigan
September 8	East	Offensive	Kalvin McRae	Ohio
September 8	East	Defensive	Larry Hutchinson	Buffalo
September 8	East	Special Teams	Simon Manka	Buffalo
September 8	West	Offensive	Ontario Sneed	Central Michigan
September 8	West	Defensive	Bryant Haines	Ball State
September 8	West	Special Teams	Brandon West	Western Michigan
September 15	East	Offensive	Drew Wily	Buffalo
September 15	East	Defensive	John Mackey	Akron
September 15	East	Special Teams	Shawn Bayes	Kent State
September 15	West	Offensive	MiQuale Lewis	Ball State
September 15	West	Defensive	Daniel Holtzclaw	Eastern Michigan
September 15	West	Special Teams	Brandon Crawford	Ball State
September 22	East	Offensive	Tyler Sheehan (2)	Bowling Green
September 22	East	Defensive	Brion Stokes	Akron
September 22	East	Special Teams	Michael Braunstein	Ohio
September 22	West	Offensive	Nate Davis	Ball State
September 22	West	Defensive	Larry English	NIU
September 22	West	Special Teams	Jalen Parmele	Toledo
September 29	East	Offensive	Eugene Jarvis	Kent State
September 29	East	Defensive	Joey Hudson	Miami
September 29	East	Special Teams	Jake Richardson	Miami
September 29	West	Offensive	Mark Bonds	Western Michigan
September 29	West	Defensive	Red Keith	Central Michigan
September 29	West	Special Teams	Antonio Brown	Central Michigan
October 6	East	Offensive	Jabari Arthur; James Starks	Akron; Buffalo
October 6	East	Defensive	Terrance Knighton	Temple
October 6	East	Special Teams	Andre Jones; Jake Brownell	Akron; Temple
October 6	West	Offensive	Dan LeFevour	Central Michigan
October 6	West	Defensive	Ryan Downard	Eastern Michigan
October 6	West	Special Teams	Brandon West (2)	Western Michigan
October 13	East	Offensive	Adam DiMichele; James Starks (2)	Temple; Buffalo
October 13	East	Defensive	Joey Hudson (2)	Miami
October 13	East	Special Teams	Michael Braunstein (2)	Ohio
October 13	West	Offensive	Dan LeFevour (2)	Central Michigan
October 13	West	Defensive	Dustin Dulco; Josh Gordy	Western Michigan; Central Michigan
October 13	West	Special Teams	Mike Jones	Western Michigan

Week	Division	Team	Player	School
October 20	East	Offensive	Willie Geter	Bowling Green
October 20	East	Defensive	Junior Galette	Temple
October 20	East	Special Teams	AJ Principe	Buffalo
October 20	West	Offensive	Jalen Parmele (2)	Toledo
October 20	West	Defensive	Brandon Crawford (2)	Ball State
October 20	West	Special Teams	Chris Miller	Ball State
October 27	East	Offensive	Kalvin McRae (2)	Ohio
October 27	East	Defensive	Mike Newton	Buffalo
October 27	East	Special Teams	Vince Davidson	Ohio
October 27	West	Offensive	Aaron Opelt	Toledo
October 27	West	Defensive	Ryan Downard (2)	Eastern Michigan
October 27	West	Special Teams	Zach Johnson	Eastern Michigan
November 5	East	Offensive	Dave DiFranco; Steve Meister; Charlie Norden; Josh Satterthwait; Steve Sutter	Miami; Miami; Miami; Miami; Miami
November 5	East	Defensive	P.J. Mahone	Bowling Green
November 5	East	Special Teams	Sinisa Vrvilo	Bowling Green
November 5	West	Offensive	Jalen Parmele (3)	Toledo
November 5	West	Defensive	Barry Church	Toledo
November 5	West	Special Teams	Andrew Hawkins	Toledo
November 12	East	Offensive	Alex Allen	Akron
November 12	East	Defensive	Glenn Stanley	Bowling Green
November 12	East	Special Teams	Bryan Williams	Akron
November 12	West	Offensive	Dan LeFevour (3)	Central Michigan
November 12	West	Defensive	Brandon Bice	NIU
November 12	West	Special Teams	Andrew Aguila	Central Michigan
November 19	East	Offensive	Tyler Sheehan (3)	Bowling Green
November 19	East	Defensive	Clayton Mullins	Miami
November 19	East	Special Teams	Delano Green	Temple
November 19	West	Offensive	Tim Hiller	Western Michigan
November 19	West	Defensive	Alex Knipp	Ball State
November 19	West	Special Teams	Brandon West (3)	Western Michigan
November 26	East	Offensive	Drew Wily (2)	Buffalo
November 26	East	Defensive	P.J. Mahone (2)	Bowling Green
November 26	East	Special Teams	Joshua Abrams (2); Nate Parseghian	Ohio; Miami
November 26	West	Offensive	Dan LeFevour (4)	Central Michigan
November 26	West	Defensive	Brandon Crawford (3)	Ball State
November 26	West	Special Teams	Andy Dittbenner; Jim Laney (2)	NIU; Western Michigan

=== Golf (men's) ===
==== MAC Championship ====
1. Eastern Michigan
2. Kent State
3. Ball State
4. Toledo
5. Akron
6. Miami
7. Ohio
8. Bowling Green
9. NIU

=== Golf (women's) ===
==== MAC Championship ====
1. Kent State (1177)
2. Eastern Michigan (1228)
3. Toledo (1232)
4. Western Michigan (1272)
5. Ball State (1277)
6. Ohio (1297)
7. NIU (1308)
8. Bowling Green (1310)

=== Gymnastics ===
==== MAC Championship ====
1. Kent State, 195.675 points
2. Eastern Michigan, 193.800
3. Central Michigan, 193.675
4. NIU, 193.375
5. Western Michigan, 192.500
6. Ball State, 192.100
7. Bowling Green, 192.025

==== Players of the week ====
The following are the gymnastics players of the week. Number of awards won this season are in parentheses.

Week	Sport	Player	School
January 15	Gymnast	Jill Kowalski (1)	Kent State
January 15	Specialist	Brittany Kopp	Kent State
January 22	Gymnast	Leah Johnson	NIU
January 22	Specialist	Christina Lenny	Kent State
January 29	Gymnast	Leah Johnson (2)	NIU
January 29	Specialist	Jennifer Naughton	NIU
February 5	Gymnast	Katie Simon	Central Michigan
February 5	Specialist	Kristin Peters	Kent State
February 12	Gymnast	Jessica Neel	Central Michigan
February 12	Specialist	Jacquelyn Bernhardt	Bowling Green
February 19	Gymnast	Andrea de la Garza	Central Michigan
February 19	Specialist	Heather Carroll	Western Michigan

Week	Sport	Player	School
February 26	Gymnast	Queenita Gamble; Courtney Lesson	Bowling Green; Western Michigan
February 26	Specialist	Jenna D'Alie	Central Michigan
March 4	Gymnast	Jolene Worley (1)	Eastern Michigan
March 4	Specialist	Rachel Stuck (1)	Kent State
March 18	Gymnast	Jolene Worley (2)	Eastern Michigan
March 18	Specialist	Danielle Espinoza	Central Michigan
March 25	Gymnast	Leah Johnson (3); Jill Kowalski (2)	NIU; Kent State
March 25	Specialist	Rachel Stuck (2)	Kent State

=== Soccer (men's) ===
==== Tournament ====
November 13; Campus sites
4	Bowling Green	0
5	NIU	3
3	Hartwick	1 *
6	Western Michigan	1

November 16; Akron, OH
1	Akron	2 †
5	NIU	1
2	Buffalo	1
3	Hartwick	0

November 18; Akron, OH
1	Akron	1 †
2	Buffalo	0

* Hartwick advances 4-2 on penalty kicks
† Double overtime

==== Standings ====
Team	Conference					Overall			
Team	W	L	T	Pct.	GB	W	L	T	Pct.
Akron	4	0	1	.900	-	13	3	2	.778
Buffalo	3	2	0	.600	1½	9	5	2	.667
Hartwick	2	1	2	.600	1½	5	4	6	.533
Bowling Green	2	2	1	.500	2	6	9	3	.417
NIU	1	3	1	.300	3	6	8	4	.444
Western Michigan	0	4	1	.100	4	7	10	1	.417

==== Players of the week ====
Week	Player	School
Week 1	Anthony Ampaipitakwong	Akron
Week 2	Robert Shuttleworth	Buffalo
Week 3	Elliot Bradbrook	Akron
Week 4	Paul Shoemaker	Bowling Green
Week 5	Dan Bulley	Buffalo

Week	Player	School
Week 6	Brian Van Buren	NIU
Week 7	Tom Oatley	Western Michigan
Week 8	Dan Bulley	Buffalo
Week 9	Hunter Van Houten	Bowling Green
Week 10	Steve Zakuani	Akron

=== Soccer (women's) ===
==== Tournament ====
November 4 Campus sites
1	Ball State	1
8	Miami	0
4	Bowling Green	2 *
5	Eastern Michigan	1
3	NIU	1
6	Ohio	0
2	Toledo	4
7	Kent State	3

November 9 Muncie, IN
1	Ball State	0
4	Bowling Green	0 **
3	NIU	0
2	Toledo	0 †

November 11; Muncie, IN
4	Bowling Green	2
2	Toledo	2 ‡

* Overtime
** Bowling Green advances 3-0 on penalty kicks
† Toledo advances 4-3 on penalty kicks
‡ Toledo wins championship 3-2 on penalty kicks

==== Standings ====
Seed	Team	Conference					Overall			
Seed	Team	W	L	T	Pct.	GB	W	L	T	Pct.
1	Ball State	9	1	1	.864	-	13	5	1	.711
2	Toledo	8	3	0	.727	1½	14	5	1	.725
3	NIU	6	3	2	.636	2½	10	5	4	.632
4	Bowling Green	6	5	0	.545	3½	10	9	1	.525
5	Eastern Michigan	5	4	2	.545	3½	7	8	4	.474
6	Ohio	5	5	1	.500	4	5	11	3	.342
7	Kent State	5	6	0	.455	4½	7	11	1	.395
8	Miami	4	6	1	.409	5	6	10	3	.395
-	Buffalo	4	6	1	.409	5	7	10	2	.421
-	Central Michigan	4	7	0	.364	5½	8	10	0	.444
-	Western Michigan	2	7	2	.273	6½	4	11	3	.306
-	Akron	1	6	4	.273	6½	6	7	6	.474

==== Players of the week ====
Week	Player	School
September 3	Julie Thompson	Miami
September 10	Molly Cornwell	Toledo
September 17	Britni Back; Shay Mannino	Akron; Central Michigan
September 24	Andrea Plewes	Toledo
October 1	Erika Schmitt	Ohio

Week	Player	School
October 8	Molly Cornwell	Toledo
October 15	Rachael Murphy	Ball State
October 22	Lindsey Curnock	NIU
October 29	Corbie Yee	Bowling Green
November 3	Erika Schmitt	Ohio

=== Softball ===
==== Standings ====
===== East =====
Seed	Team	Conference				Overall		
Seed	Team	W	L	Pct.	GB	W	L	Pct.
1	Kent State	20	2	.909	–	44	10	.815
3	Bowling Green	14	5	.737	4½	19	24	.442
4	Miami	13	9	.591	7	23	27	.460
6	Ohio	10	12	.455	10	29	26	.527
8	Akron	8	14	.363	12	20	38	.345
–	Buffalo	5	13	.278	13	10	32	.238

===== West =====
Seed	Team	Conference				Overall		
Seed	Team	W	L	Pct.	GB	W	L	Pct.
2	Central Michigan	14	7	.667	–	25	20	.556
5	Western Michigan	10	8	.556	2½	20	18	.526
7	Ball State	9	11	.450	4½	36	32	.529
–	NIU	7	13	.350	6½	13	30	.302
–	Eastern Michigan	6	12	.333	6½	15	30	.333
–	Toledo	5	15	.250	8½	16	27	.372

==== Players of the week ====
Week	Division	Position	Player	School
February 12	East	Player	Jess Carmichael	Kent State
February 12	East	Pitcher	Lisa McLean	Akron
February 12	West	Player	None selected	
February 12	West	Pitcher	None selected	
February 19	East	Player	Jessica Toocheck (1)	Kent State
February 19	East	Pitcher	Gabrielle Burns (1)	Kent State
February 19	West	Player	Samantha Vargocko	Western Michigan
February 19	West	Pitcher	Kari Chambers	Eastern Michigan
February 26	East	Player	Jessica Toocheck (2)	Kent State
February 26	East	Pitcher	Gabrielle Burns (2)	Kent State
February 26	West	Player	Amanda Pick	Ball State
February 26	West	Pitcher	Tiffany Garofano (1)	Ball State

Week	Division	Position	Player	School
March 4	East	Player	Mary Russell	Buffalo
March 4	East	Pitcher	Christina Swierz	Akron
March 4	West	Player	Jenny Scherer	Eastern Michigan
March 4	West	Pitcher	Kyla Sullivan (1)	Western Michigan
March 18	East	Player	Sharon Barr	Buffalo
March 18	East	Pitcher	Kylie Reynolds	Kent State
March 18	West	Player	Michelle Nendza	NIU
March 18	West	Pitcher	Tiffany Garofano (2)	Ball State
March 25	East	Player	Christine Bills	Miami
March 25	East	Pitcher	Gabrielle Burns (3)	Kent State
March 25	West	Player	Leslie Strong	Toledo
March 25	West	Pitcher	Kyla Sullivan (2)	Western Michigan

=== Swimming (men's) ===
==== Standings ====
Team	Conference					Overall			
Team	W	L	T	Pct.	GB	W	L	T	Pct.
Eastern Michigan	3	0	0	1.000	–	6	3	0	.667
Miami	2	1	0	.667	1	6	5	1	.542
Buffalo	1	2	0	.333	2	3	3	0	.500
Ball State	0	3	0	.000	3	4	4	0	.500

==== MAC Championship results ====
1. Eastern Michigan, 589 points
2. Miami, 315.5
3. Buffalo, 200
4. Ball State, 111

==== Players of the week ====
Week	Player	School
October 16	Connor Vander Zalm	Buffalo
October 24	Michael McDowell	Buffalo
October 30	Darin Smith	Miami
November 5	Zach Ruske	Buffalo
November 12	None awarded	
November 20	Ryan Franklin	Ball State

Week	Player	School
December 4	Michael McDowell (2)	Buffalo
January 15	Michael McDowell (3)	Buffalo
January 22	Paul Ricard	Miami
January 29	Derrick Roe	Eastern Michigan
February 5	Donald Ellison	Eastern Michigan
February 12	Nick DuPuis	Miami

=== Swimming (women's) ===
==== Standings ====
Team	Conference					Overall			
Team	W	L	T	Pct.	GB	W	L	T	Pct.
Toledo	7	0	0	1.000	–	11	2	0	.846
Ohio	6	1	0	.857	1	12	1	0	.923
Eastern Michigan	5	2	0	.714	2	9	3	0	.750
Ball State	4	3	0	.571	3	9	4	0	.692
Buffalo	3	4	0	.429	4	6	4	0	.600
Miami	3	4	0	.429	4	5	6	0	.455
Akron	1	6	0	.143	6	3	7	0	.300
Bowling Green	0	7	0	.000	7	0	7	0	.000

==== MAC Championship results ====
1. Ohio, 679.5 points
2. Toledo, 605.5
3. Eastern Michigan, 575
4. Miami, 538
5. Buffalo, 341
6. Bowling Green, 333.5
7. Akron, 246
8. Ball State, 175.5

==== Players of the week ====
Week	Player	School
October 11	Kathryn Stevens	Miami
October 16	Andrea Lehner	Buffalo
October 24	Jacy Dyer	Toledo
October 30	Emily Wylam	Ohio
November 5	Alisha Yee	Bowling Green
November 11	Andrea Lehner (2)	Buffalo
November 20	Addison Del Rio	Ball State
December 4	Andrea Lehner (3)	Buffalo

Week	Player	School
January 9	Leah Woodard	Toledo
January 15	Kylie Gamelier	Toledo
January 22	Madeleine Pilchard; Megan Reissig	Eastern Michigan; Toledo
January 29	Chelsey Bower	Ohio
February 5	Madeleine Pilchard (2)	Eastern Michigan
February 12	Stephanie Paul	Ball State

=== Tennis (men's) ===
==== Players of the week ====
Week	Player	School
January 23	Michael Calderone	Western Michigan
January 30	Brian Livingston	NIU
February 6	Jared Miller	Toledo

Week	Player	School
February 13	Alex Friesen	NIU
February 20	Kevin Hayward	Western Michigan

=== Tennis (women's) ===
==== Players of the week ====
Week	Player	School
January 23	Kelsey Jakupcin	Bowling Green
January 30	Anastasia Dracheva	Miami
February 6	Noriko Saruta	Western Michigan

Week	Player	School
February 13	Kelsey Jakupcin (2)	Bowling Green
February 20	Vanessa Frankowski	Eastern Michigan

=== Track and field (men's) ===
==== Indoor MAC Championships ====
1. Eastern Michigan, 207 points
2. Akron, 124
3. Kent State, 98
4. Central Michigan, 47
4. Buffalo, 47

==== Outdoor MAC Championships ====
1. Akron, 182 points
2. Eastern Michigan, 182
3. Kent State, 153
4. Miami, 192.5
5. Central Michigan, 85.5
6. Buffalo, 79

==== Players of the week ====
Week	Sport	Player	School
January 14	Track	Ezekiel Porter	Buffalo
January 14	Field	Cadeau Kelley	Akron
January 21	Track	Abraham Mach	Central Michigan
January 21	Field	Mike McGregor	Central Michigan
January 28	Track	Clint Allen	Eastern Michigan
January 28	Field	Kyle Holmes	Eastern Michigan

Week	Sport	Player	School
February 4	Track	Jake DuBois	Eastern Michigan
February 4	Field	Mike McCall	Akron
February 11	Track	Clint Allen (2)	Eastern Michigan
February 11	Field	Shamel Smith	Kent State
February 18	Track	Clint Allen (3)	Eastern Michigan
February 18	Field	Auston Papay	Akron

=== Track and field (women's) ===
==== Indoor MAC Championships ====
1. Akron, 106 points
2. Western Michigan, 96
3. Miami, 88
4. Ball State, 86
5. Central Michigan, 55.50
6. Buffalo, 50.50
7. Eastern Michigan, 40.50
8. Kent State, 34
9. Toledo, 32.50
10. Ohio, 32
11. Bowling Green, 26.50
12. NIU, 12.50

==== Outdoor MAC Championships ====
1 Akron, 208.5 points
2 Western Michigan, 153
3 Miami, 73.5
4 Kent State, 73
5 Central Michigan, 64
6 Buffalo, 50.5
7 Ohio, 43
8 Toledo, 35.5
9 Eastern Michigan, 35
9 Ball State, 35
11 Bowling Green, 29
12 NIU, 18

==== Players of the week ====
Week	Sport	Player	School
January 14	Track	Patrice Coney	Buffalo
January 14	Field	Stevi Large	Akron
January 21	Track	Andrea Bryson	Kent State
January 21	Field	Meagan Guenther	NIU
January 28	Track	Patrice Coney (2)	Buffalo
January 28	Field	Stevi Large (2)	Akron

Week	Sport	Player	School
February 4	Track	Ali Bishel	Ball State
February 4	Field	Kristina Bolterstein	Miami University
February 11	Track	Becky Horn	Western Michigan
February 11	Field	Janice Keppler	Eastern Michigan
February 18	Track	Becky Horn (2)	Western Michigan
February 18	Field	Fatimah Hill	Buffalo

=== Volleyball ===
The 2007 Mid-American Conference volleyball season begins in August and ends with the NCAA tournament in November. The MAC Tournament begins November 13 on campus sites and concludes with the finals November 18 at the SeaGate Convention Centre in Toledo, OH.

==== Tournament ====
November 13; Campus sites
8	NIU	3
9	Ball State	1
5	Kent State	3
12	Buffalo	0
7	Eastern Michigan	3
10	Akron	0
6	Central Michigan	3
11	Toledo	2

November 16; SeaGate Centre
8	NIU	1
1	Ohio	3
5	Kent State	3
4	Bowling Green	0
7	Eastern Michigan	3
2	Western Michigan	1
6	Central Michigan	0
3	Miami	3

November 17; SeaGate Centre
1	Ohio	3
5	Kent State	1
7	Eastern Michigan	0
3	Miami	3

November 18; SeaGate Centre
1	Ohio	0
3	Miami	3

==== Standings ====
===== East =====
Team	Conference				Overall		
Team	W	L	Pct.	GB	W	L	Pct.
Ohio	15	1	.938	–	25	5	.833
Miami	13	3	.813	2	19	9	.679
Bowling Green	12	4	.750	3	21	10	.677
Kent State	11	5	.688	4	20	9	.690
Akron	2	15	.118	13	10	19	.345
Buffalo	1	15	.063	14	2	31	.061

===== West =====
Team	Conference				Overall		
Team	W	L	Pct.	GB	W	L	Pct.
Western Michigan	12	4	.750	–	21	10	.677
Central Michigan	10	6	.625	2	21	10	.677
Eastern Michigan	8	8	.500	4	20	14	.588
NIU	7	9	.438	5	14	18	.438
Ball State	4	12	.250	8	5	25	.167
Toledo	1	15	.063	11	4	24	.143

==== Players of the week ====
Week	Division	Player	School
August 27	East	Ellen Herman	Ohio
August 27	West	Ashley Vogl	Western Michigan
September 3	East	Ellen Herman	Ohio
September 3	West	Kate Fisel	Central Michigan
September 10	East	Jess Antosz	Akron
September 10	West	Dani D'Ambrose	NIU
September 17	East	Stephanie Swiger	Bowling Green
September 17	West	Becky Reenders	Eastern Michigan
September 24	East	Melissa Griffin	Ohio
September 24	West	Michelle Moore	Western Michigan
October 1	East	Carli Reihman	Miami
October 1	West	Caitlin Strimel	Western Michigan

Week	Division	Player	School
October 8	East	Kendra Halm	Bowling Green
October 8	West	Irene Johnson	NIU
October 15	East	Kendra Halm	Bowling Green
October 15	West	Ashley Vogl	Western Michigan
October 22	East	Ashley Feutz	Kent State
October 22	West	Kate Fissel	Central Michigan
October 29	East	Carli Reihman	Miami
October 29	West	Kate Eberling	Western Michigan
November 5	East	Kendra Halm	Bowling Green
November 5	West	Courtney Kersten	Central Michigan
November 12	East	Jess Antosz	Akron
November 12	West	Becky Reenders	Eastern Michigan

=== Wrestling ===
Central Michigan was picked to win the MAC Championship by the league coaches. Kent State was picked to finish second. The 2008 MAC Championships was held March 8 through 9, 2008 at Kent State.

==== Standings ====
Team	Conference					Overall			
Team	W	L	T	Pct.	GB	W	L	T	Pct.
Central Michigan	5	0	0	1.000	-	16	2	0	.889
Kent State	4	1	0	.800	1	14	5	0	.737
NIU	3	2	0	.600	2	10	7	0	.588
Eastern Michigan	2	3	0	.400	3	15	7	1	.674
Buffalo	1	4	0	.200	4	8	7	1	.531
Ohio	0	5	0	.100	5	6	16	0	.273

==== Players of the week ====
Week	Player	Weight	School
November 7	Sean Clair	133 lbs.	Eastern Michigan
November 14	Dan Mitcheff	133 lbs.	Kent State
November 21	Dana Gingerich	149 lbs.	Buffalo
November 28	Luke Smith	125 lbs.	Central Michigan
December 4	Duke Burk	174 lbs.	NIU
December 11	Andrew Novak	125 lbs.	Eastern Michigan
December 18	Sean Clair (2)	133 lbs.	Eastern Michigan
January 2	Christian Sinnott	184 lbs.	Central Michigan
January 8	Bubba Gritter		Central Michigan

Week	Player	Weight	School
January 16	Kurt Gross	165 lbs.	Kent State
January 22	Trevor Stewart	165 lbs.	Central Michigan
January 29	Sean Clair (3)	133 lbs.	Eastern Michigan
February 5	Jermail Porter	285 lbs.	Kent State
February 12	Pat Castillo	133 lbs.	NIU
February 21	Eric Kruger	141 lbs.	Central Michigan
February 27	Brandon Carter; Cory Mancuso	149 lbs. 157 lbs.	Central Michigan; Eastern Michigan

== See also ==
- Mid-American Conference
- List of Mid-American Conference champions
