= 2007 Temple Owls football team =

American college football season

2007 Temple Owls football
- Conference: Mid-American Conference
- East
- Record: 4–8 (4–4 MAC)
- Head coach: Al Golden (2nd season)
- Offensive coordinator: George DeLeone (2nd season)
- Offensive scheme: Pro-style
- Defensive coordinator: Mark D'Onofrio (2nd season)
- Base defense: 4–3
- Home stadium: Lincoln Financial Field

2007 Mid-American Conference football standings
	Div			Conf.			Overall
Team	W		L	W		L	W		L
East Division
Miami (OH) xy	4	–	2	5	–	2	6	–	7
Bowling Green x	4	–	2	6	–	2	8	–	5
Buffalo x	4	–	2	5	–	3	5	–	7
Ohio	3	–	3	4	–	4	6	–	6
Temple	3	–	3	4	–	4	4	–	8
Akron	2	–	4	3	–	5	4	–	8
Kent State	1	–	5	1	–	7	3	–	9
West Division
Central Michigan xy$	4	–	1	6	–	1	8	–	6
Ball State x	4	–	1	5	–	2	7	–	6
Eastern Michigan	3	–	2	3	–	4	4	–	8
Western Michigan	2	–	3	3	–	4	5	–	7
Toledo	2	–	3	3	–	5	5	–	7
Northern Illinois	0	–	5	1	–	6	2	–	10
Championship: Central Michigan 35, Miami 10
$ – Conference champion; x – Division champion/co-champions; Due to an unbalanced conference schedule, the team with best division record within each division was awarded that division's championship game berth.

The 2007 Temple Owls football team represented Temple University in the college 2007 NCAA Division I FBS football season. Temple competed as a member of the Mid-American Conference (MAC) East Division. The team was coached by Al Golden and played their homes game in Lincoln Financial Field. The Owls finished the season with a record of 4–8.

== Schedule ==
Date	Time	Opponent	Site	TV	Result	Attendance
August 31	7:00 pm	Navy*	Lincoln Financial Field; Philadelphia, PA	ESPNU	L 19–30	30,368
September 8	1:00 pm	Buffalo	Lincoln Financial Field; Philadelphia, PA		L 7–42	15,629
September 15	12:00 pm	at Connecticut*	Rentschler Field; East Hartford, CT	ESPN Plus	L 17–22	33,810
September 22	12:00 pm	at Bowling Green	Doyt Perry Stadium; Bowling Green, OH	ESPN Plus	L 35–48	16,482
September 29	12:00 pm	at Army*	Michie Stadium; West Point, NY	ESPNU	L 21–37	34,176
October 6	1:00 pm	Northern Illinois	Lincoln Financial Field; Philadelphia, PA		W 16–15	21,065
October 13	6:00 pm	at Akron	Rubber Bowl; Akron, OH		W 24–20	14,017
October 20	12:00 pm	Miami (OH)	Lincoln Financial Field; Philadelphia, PA	ESPN Plus	W 24–17	21,041
November 2	7:00 pm	at Ohio	Peden Stadium; Athens, OH		L 7–23	15,632
November 10	12:00 pm	Penn State*	Lincoln Financial Field; Philadelphia, PA	ESPNU	L 0–31	69,029
November 17	12:00 pm	Kent State	Lincoln Financial Field; Philadelphia, PA		W 24–14	16,019
November 24	2:00 pm	at Western Michigan	Waldo Stadium; Kalamazoo, MI		L 3–16	8,662
*Non-conference game; All times are in Eastern time
