= 2007 Ohio Bobcats football team =

American college football season

2007 Ohio Bobcats football
- Conference: Mid-American Conference
- East
- Record: 6–6 (4–4 MAC)
- Head coach: Frank Solich (3rd season)
- Offensive coordinator: Tim Albin (3rd season)
- Defensive coordinator: Jim Burrow (3rd season)
- Home stadium: Peden Stadium

2007 Mid-American Conference football standings
	Div			Conf.			Overall
Team	W		L	W		L	W		L
East Division
Miami (OH) xy	4	–	2	5	–	2	6	–	7
Bowling Green x	4	–	2	6	–	2	8	–	5
Buffalo x	4	–	2	5	–	3	5	–	7
Ohio	3	–	3	4	–	4	6	–	6
Temple	3	–	3	4	–	4	4	–	8
Akron	2	–	4	3	–	5	4	–	8
Kent State	1	–	5	1	–	7	3	–	9
West Division
Central Michigan xy$	4	–	1	6	–	1	8	–	6
Ball State x	4	–	1	5	–	2	7	–	6
Eastern Michigan	3	–	2	3	–	4	4	–	8
Western Michigan	2	–	3	3	–	4	5	–	7
Toledo	2	–	3	3	–	5	5	–	7
Northern Illinois	0	–	5	1	–	6	2	–	10
Championship: Central Michigan 35, Miami 10
$ – Conference champion; x – Division champion/co-champions; Due to an unbalanced conference schedule, the team with best division record within each division was awarded that division's championship game berth.

The 2007 Ohio Bobcats football team represented Ohio University during the 2007 NCAA Division I FBS football season. Ohio competed as a member of the Mid-American Conference (MAC). The Bobcats were led by Frank Solich in his third year as head coach. They played their home games in Peden Stadium in Athens, Ohio.

== Schedule ==
Date	Time	Opponent	Site	TV	Result	Attendance
September 1	7:00 pm	Gardner–Webb*	Peden Stadium; Athens, OH	GTN	W 36–14	19,823
September 8	7:00 pm	at Louisiana–Lafayette*	Cajun Field; Lafayette, LA		W 31–23	22,186
September 15	1:30 pm	at No. 18 Virginia Tech*	Lane Stadium; Blacksburg, VA	ESPN360	L 7–28	66,233
September 22	3:00 pm	Wyoming*	Peden Stadium; Athens, OH	GTN	L 33–34	16,781
September 29	3:00 pm	Kent State	Peden Stadium; Athens, OH	FSN-OH	L 25–33	18,297
October 6	1:00 pm	at Buffalo	University at Buffalo Stadium; Amherst, NY		L 10–31	10,755
October 13	12:00 pm	Eastern Michigan	Peden Stadium; Athens, OH	ESPN+	W 48–42	17,031
October 20	7:00 pm	at Toledo	Glass Bowl; Toledo, OH	GTN	L 40–43	18,928
October 27	6:00 pm	at Bowling Green	Doyt Perry Stadium; Bowling Green, OH	GTN	W 38–27	11,602
November 2	7:00 pm	Temple	Peden Stadium; Athens, OH		W 23–7	15,632
November 7	7:30 pm	at Akron	Rubber Bowl; Akron, OH	ESPN2	L 37–48	12,453
November 24	2:00 pm	Miami (OH)	Peden Stadium; Athens, OH (Battle of the Bricks)	GTN	W 38–29	11,438
*Non-conference game; Rankings from AP Poll released prior to the game; All times are in Eastern time
