= 2007 Ball State Cardinals football team =

American college football season

2007 Ball State Cardinals football
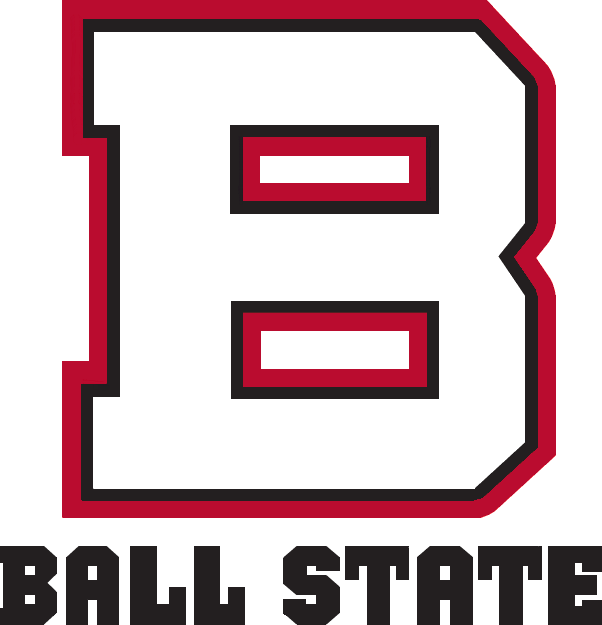

MAC West Division co-champion

International Bowl, L 30–52 vs. Rutgers
- Conference: Mid-American Conference
- West
- Record: 7–6 (5–2 MAC)
- Head coach: Brady Hoke (5th season)
- Offensive coordinator: Stan Parrish
- Defensive coordinator: Mark Smith
- Home stadium: Scheumann Stadium (Capacity: 22,500)

2007 Mid-American Conference football standings
	Div			Conf.			Overall
Team	W		L	W		L	W		L
East Division
Miami (OH) xy	4	–	2	5	–	2	6	–	7
Bowling Green x	4	–	2	6	–	2	8	–	5
Buffalo x	4	–	2	5	–	3	5	–	7
Ohio	3	–	3	4	–	4	6	–	6
Temple	3	–	3	4	–	4	4	–	8
Akron	2	–	4	3	–	5	4	–	8
Kent State	1	–	5	1	–	7	3	–	9
West Division
Central Michigan xy$	4	–	1	6	–	1	8	–	6
Ball State x	4	–	1	5	–	2	7	–	6
Eastern Michigan	3	–	2	3	–	4	4	–	8
Western Michigan	2	–	3	3	–	4	5	–	7
Toledo	2	–	3	3	–	5	5	–	7
Northern Illinois	0	–	5	1	–	6	2	–	10
Championship: Central Michigan 35, Miami 10
$ – Conference champion; x – Division champion/co-champions; Due to an unbalanced conference schedule, the team with best division record within each division was awarded that division's championship game berth.

The 2007 Ball State Cardinals football team competed in football on behalf of the Ball State University during the 2007 NCAA Division I FBS football season. They won the majority of their games, led by their quarterback Nate Davis who threw 20+ touchdown passes connecting to receivers Dante Love and Darius Hill for more than 10 touchdown passes combined.

The Cardinals finished the regular season 7–5, reaching their first bowl game since 1996. The team has tallied victories against Eastern Michigan, Navy, Buffalo, Western Michigan, WKU and Toledo, while being defeated by Miami (Ohio), Nebraska, Central Michigan, Illinois and Indiana. The offense is led by sophomore quarterback Nate Davis (57.6% comp., 1928 yds., 18 TD, 3 INT), junior tight end Darius Hill (35 rec., 517 rec. yds., 6 TD), junior wide receiver Dante Love (44 rec., 643 rec. yds., 7 TD), and freshman running back Frank Edmonds (347 rushing yds., 5 TD).

The most impressive win of the season came at home against Buffalo, where the Cards, anchored by three Nate Davis passing TDs and two Frank Edmonds rushing TDs, won 49–14. The worst defeat of the season, in what was being billed by many as a showcase for who would represent the Western Division in the MAC Championship game, was at the hands of the Central Michigan Chippewas, who routed the Cardinals 58–38. The Chippewas passing/running sensation, sophomore quarterback Dan LeFevour put in his finest aerial performance of the season to date, completing 30 of 38 passes (5 TD/1 INT) while also adding 146 yards rushing yards on 16 carries (1 TD).

== Schedule ==
Date	Time	Opponent	Site	TV	Result	Attendance	Source
August 30	7:00 pm	Miami (OH)	Scheumann Stadium; Muncie, IN	Comcast	L 13–14	15,488	
September 8	12:00 pm	at Eastern Michigan	Rynearson Stadium; Ypsilanti, MI	Comcast	W 38–16	5,794	
September 15	5:00 pm	at Navy*	Navy–Marine Corps Memorial Stadium; Annapolis, MD	CSTV	W 34–31 ^{OT}	32,087	
September 22	12:30 pm	at No. 24 Nebraska*	Memorial Stadium; Lincoln, NE	FSN	L 40–41	84,394	
September 29	12:00 pm	Buffalo	Scheumann Stadium; Muncie, IN		W 49–14	14,333	
October 6	12:00 pm	Central Michigan	Scheumann Stadium; Muncie, IN	WNDY/ESPN Plus	L 38–58	9,617	
October 13	2:00 pm	Western Kentucky*^{†}	Scheumann Stadium; Muncie, IN		W 35–12	15,824	
October 20	2:00 pm	at Western Michigan	Waldo Stadium; Kalamazoo, MI	Comcast	W 27–23	17,892	
October 27	11:00 am	at Illinois*	Memorial Stadium; Champaign, IL	BTN	L 17–28	55,578	
November 3	12:00 pm	at Indiana*	Memorial Stadium; Bloomington, IN	BTN	L 20–38	34,406	
November 13	7:30 pm	Toledo	Scheumann Stadium; Muncie, IN	ESPN2	W 41–20	10,162	
November 24	3:00 pm	at Northern Illinois	Huskie Stadium; DeKalb, IL (rivalry)	Comcast	W 27–21	8,237	
January 5	12:00 pm	vs. Rutgers*	Rogers Centre; Toronto, ON (International Bowl)	ESPN2	L 30–52	31,455	
*Non-conference game; ^{†}Homecoming; Rankings from AP Poll released prior to the game; All times are in Eastern time

== Players ==
- Nate Davis: Passing Yards-3000+ yards and 25 + touchdown passes
- Dante Love: 70+ receptions, 1000+ receiving yards, and 7 touchdowns.
- Darius Hill: 40+ receptions, 650+ receiving yards, and 7 touchdowns.
- Frank Edmonds: 121 rushes, 466 rushing yards, 3.9 yards/per carry, and 6 touchdowns.
- Bryant Haines: 125 total tackles, 15 yards, 1 interception.
- Chris Miller: All American First Team punter.

HB MiQuale Lewis only played 4 games following an ACL injury, but ran for 447 rushing yards, 4.9 yards/per carry, and 2 touchdowns. He also put up 111.8 rushing yards a game.
