= 2008 NFL draft =

2008 American football draft

General information
- Date: April 26–27, 2008
- Time: 3:00 pm EDT (April 26); 10:00 am EDT (April 27)
- Location: Radio City Music Hall in New York City
- Networks: ESPN, ESPN2, NFL Network

Overview
- 252 total selections in 7 rounds
- League: NFL
- First selection: Jake Long, OT; Miami Dolphins
- Mr. Irrelevant: David Vobora, LB; St. Louis Rams
- Most selections (12): Chicago Bears; Kansas City Chiefs
- Fewest selections (5): Cleveland Browns; Jacksonville Jaguars; Minnesota Vikings; Oakland Raiders; San Diego Chargers

The 2008 NFL draft was the 73rd annual meeting of National Football League (NFL) franchises to select newly eligible American football players. The draft took place at Radio City Music Hall in New York City, New York, on April 26 and April 27, 2008. For the 29th consecutive year, ESPN televised the draft; the NFL Network also broadcast the event, its third year doing so. Of the 252 selections, 220 were regular selections in rounds one through seven, and 32 were compensatory selections, distributed among rounds three through seven. As of the end of the 2018 season, 27 players have been selected to the Pro Bowl.

For the first time since the common draft began, no wide receiver was selected in the first round. For the first time ever, the first two picks had the same last name (Jake and Chris Long; they were unrelated). Additionally, a then-record 34 trades were made during the draft itself. This number of trades was later broken in 2017.

As of 2025, there are only five remaining active players in the NFL from the 2008 draft class: Ravens defensive end Calais Campbell, Bengals quarterback Joe Flacco, Panthers long snapper J. J. Jansen, 49ers long snapper Jon Weeks, and Bengals quarterback Josh Johnson, although Johnson was absent from 2014 to 2017, from 2019 to 2020, and again in 2023.

== Changes for 2008 ==
The schedule for the draft was changed: day one began at 3:00 p.m. EDT, instead of noon, and consisted of just two rounds. Day two began with round three at 10:00 a.m. EDT, instead of 11:00 a.m. Moreover, the time limits for day one selections were reduced, from 15 minutes to 10 for first-round picks and from 10 minutes to 7 in the second. The limit remained 5 minutes for all picks in rounds three through seven.

The draft also marked the official debut of a new NFL shield logo, replacing the old shield logo which had been used since 1970, featuring eight white stars to represent each of the league's eight divisions, and a football rotated to the same angle as the one on the top of the Vince Lombardi Trophy given to the Super Bowl champion.

== Player breakdown ==
The following is the breakdown of the 252 players by position:

- 35 wide receivers
- 30 cornerbacks
- 28 linebackers
- 26 defensive ends
- 26 offensive tackles
- 23 running backs
- 18 defensive tackles
- 16 tight ends
- 15 safeties
- 13 quarterbacks
- 7 guards
- 7 centers
- 4 fullbacks
- 2 kickers
- 1 punter

== Player selections ==
*	= compensatory selection
^{†}	= Pro Bowler (Note: Players are identified as a Pro Bowler if they were selected for the Pro Bowl at any time in their career.)

Positions key
Offense	Defense	Special teams
QB — Quarterback; RB — Running back; FB — Fullback; WR — Wide receiver; TE — Tight end; OL — Offensive lineman; T — Tackle; G — Guard; C — Center	DL — Defensive lineman; DT — Defensive tackle (Note: Includes nose tackle (NT)); DE — Defensive end; EDGE — Edge rusher; LB — Linebacker (Note: Includes middle linebacker (MLB/MIKE), weakside linebacker (WILL), strongside linebacker (SAM), off-ball linebacker, and outside linebacker (OLB)); DB — Defensive back; CB — Cornerback; S — Safety (Note: Includes free safety (FS) and strong safety (SS))	K — Kicker (Note: Also known as a placekicker (PK)); P — Punter; LS — Long snapper; RS — Return specialist (Note: Includes kickoff and punt returners)

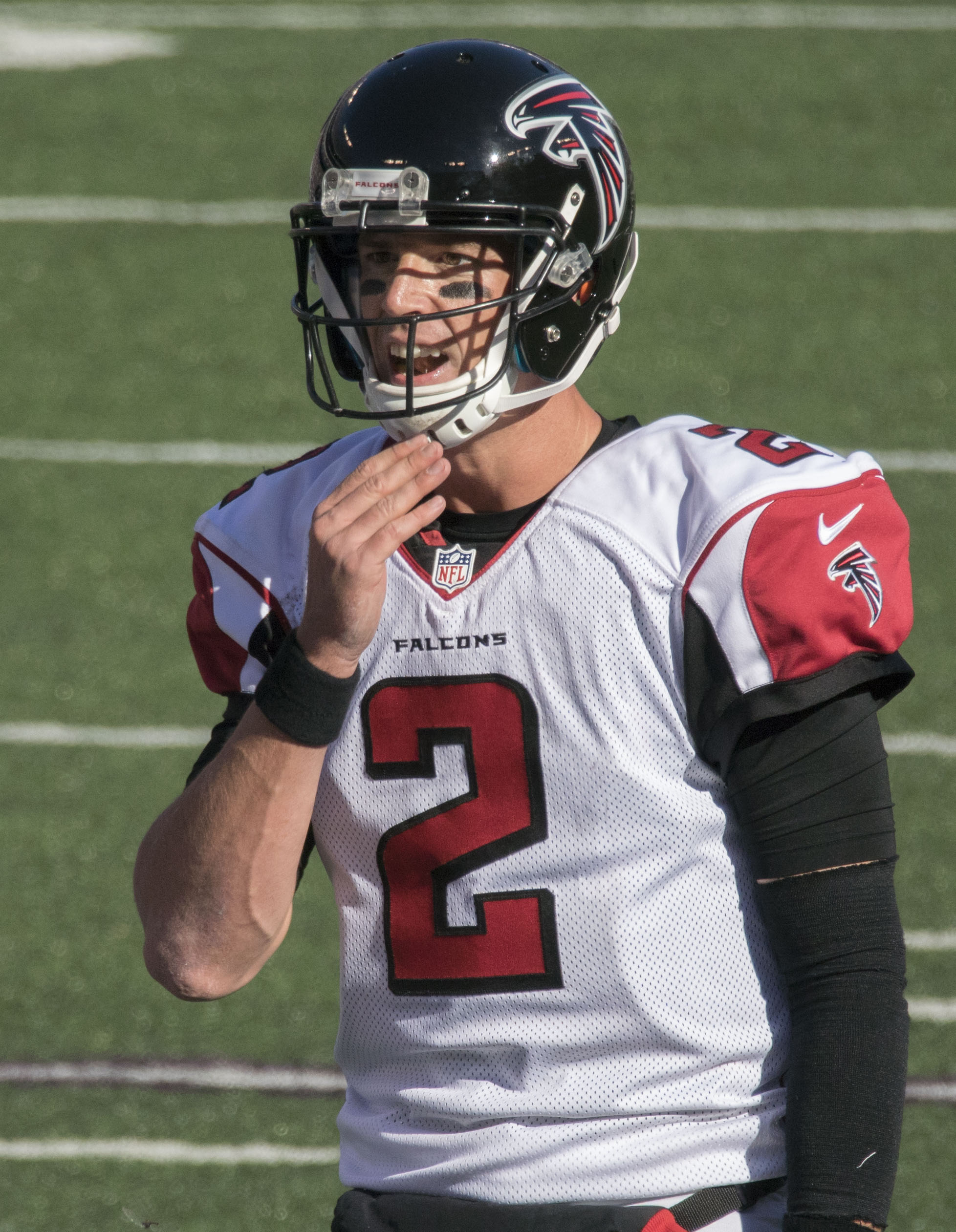
The 2016 MVP Matt Ryan was drafted third overall by the Atlanta Falcons.

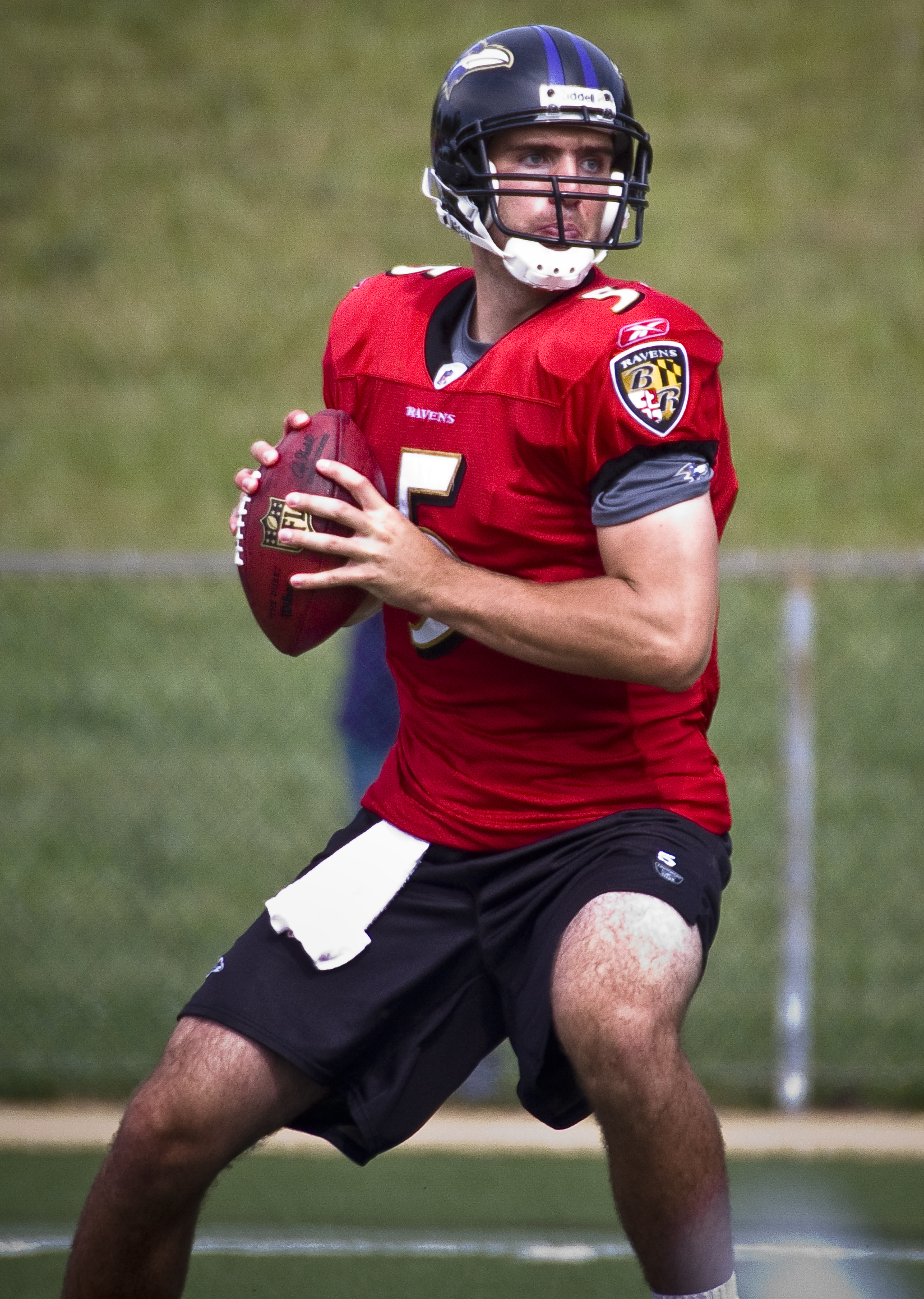
Quarterback Joe Flacco, drafted 18th overall, led the Baltimore Ravens to a Super Bowl win and holds many team passing records.

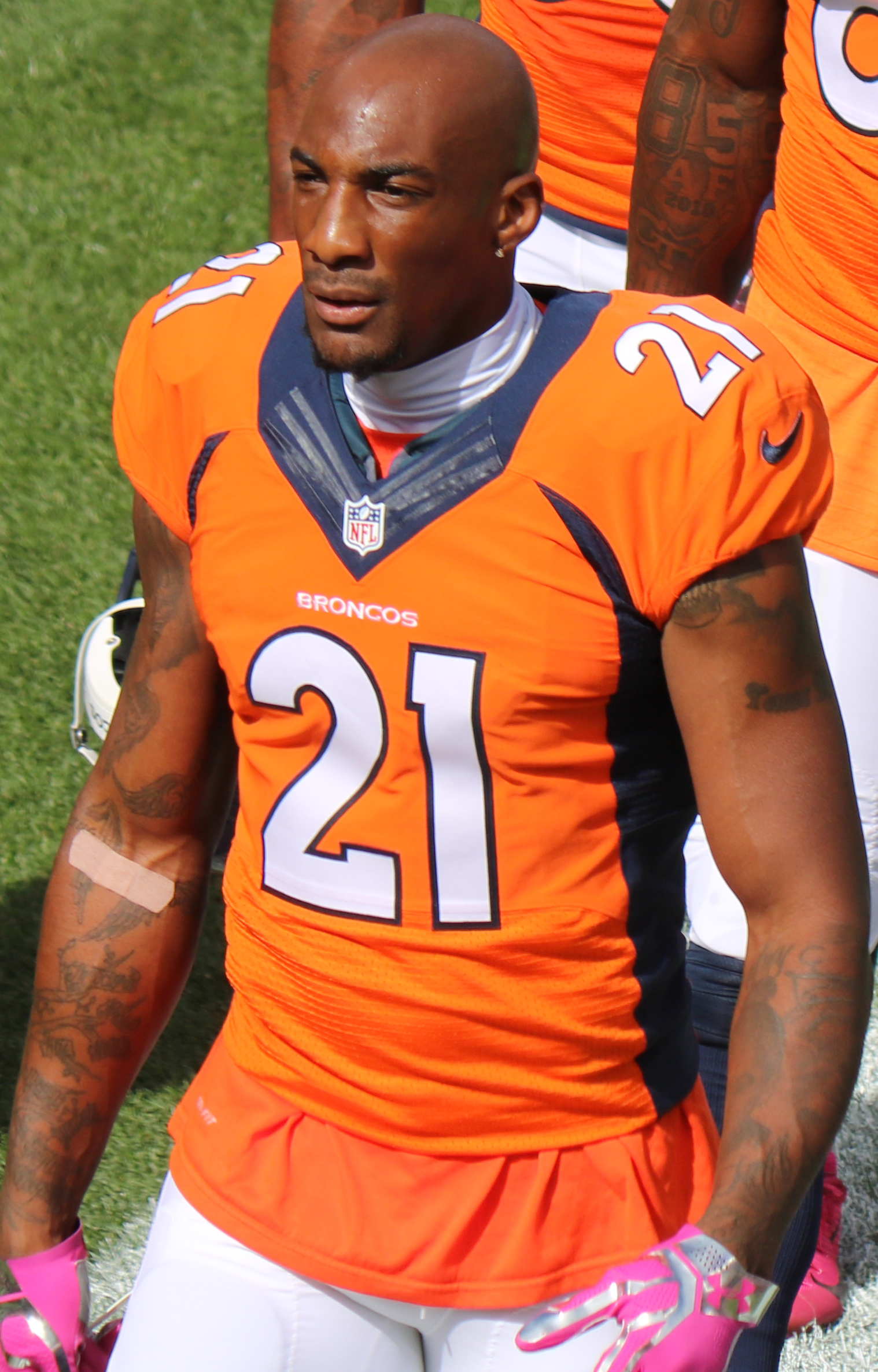
Cornerback Aqib Talib, drafted 20th overall, made 5 Pro Bowls and was named an All-Pro twice.

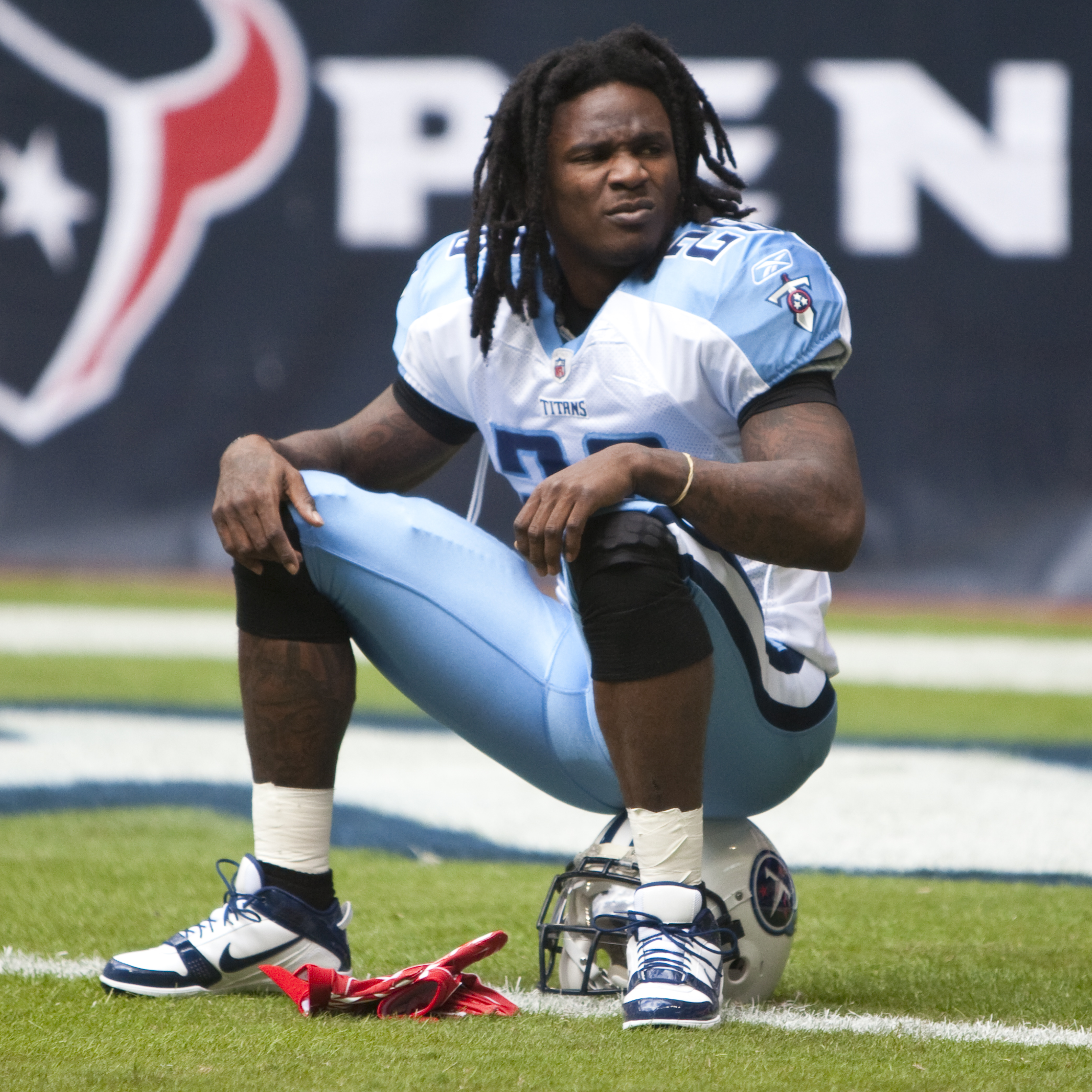
24th overall pick Chris Johnson holds the NFL record for most yards from scrimmage in a single season, and is one of nine members of the 2,000-yard club.

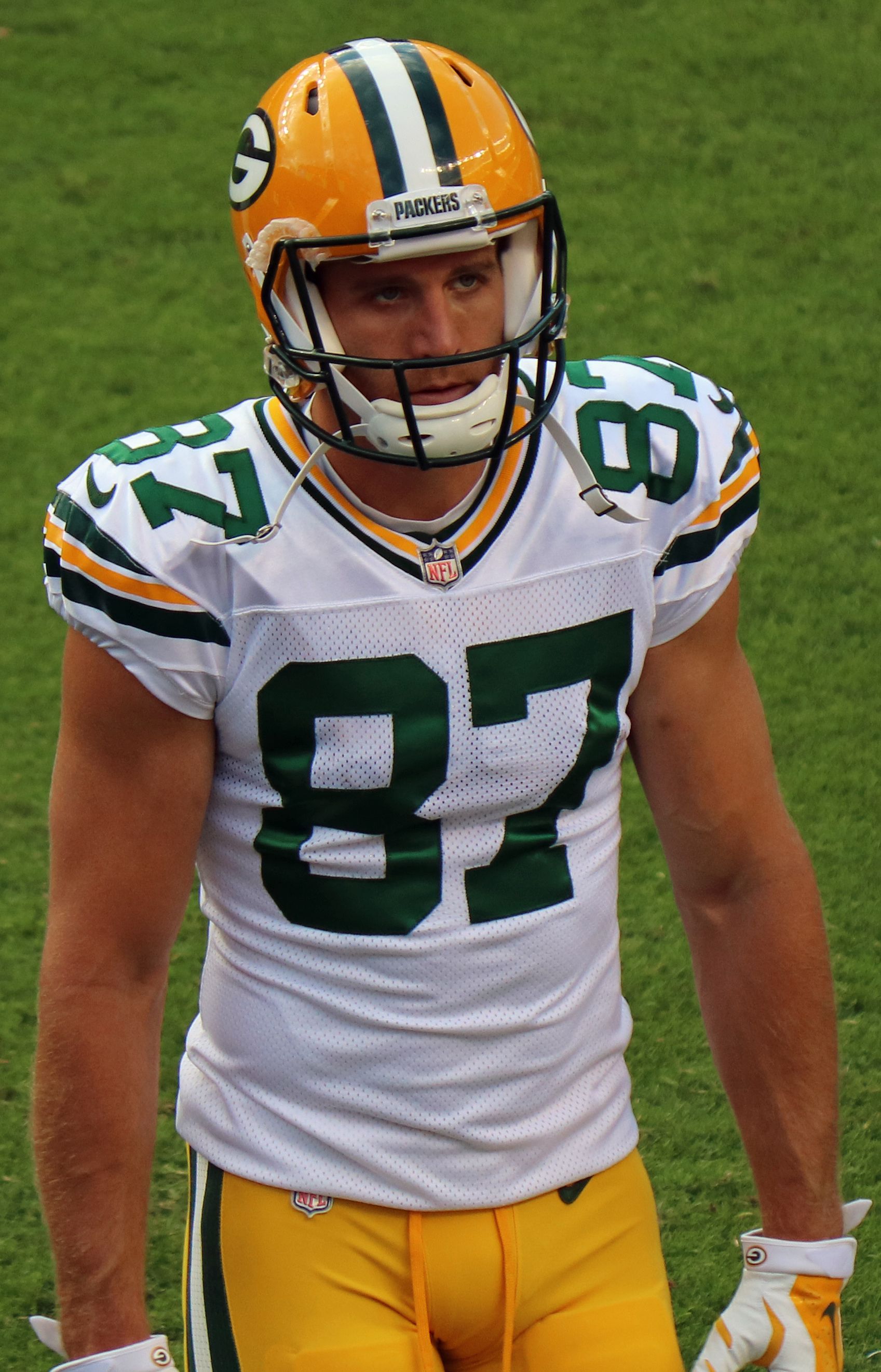
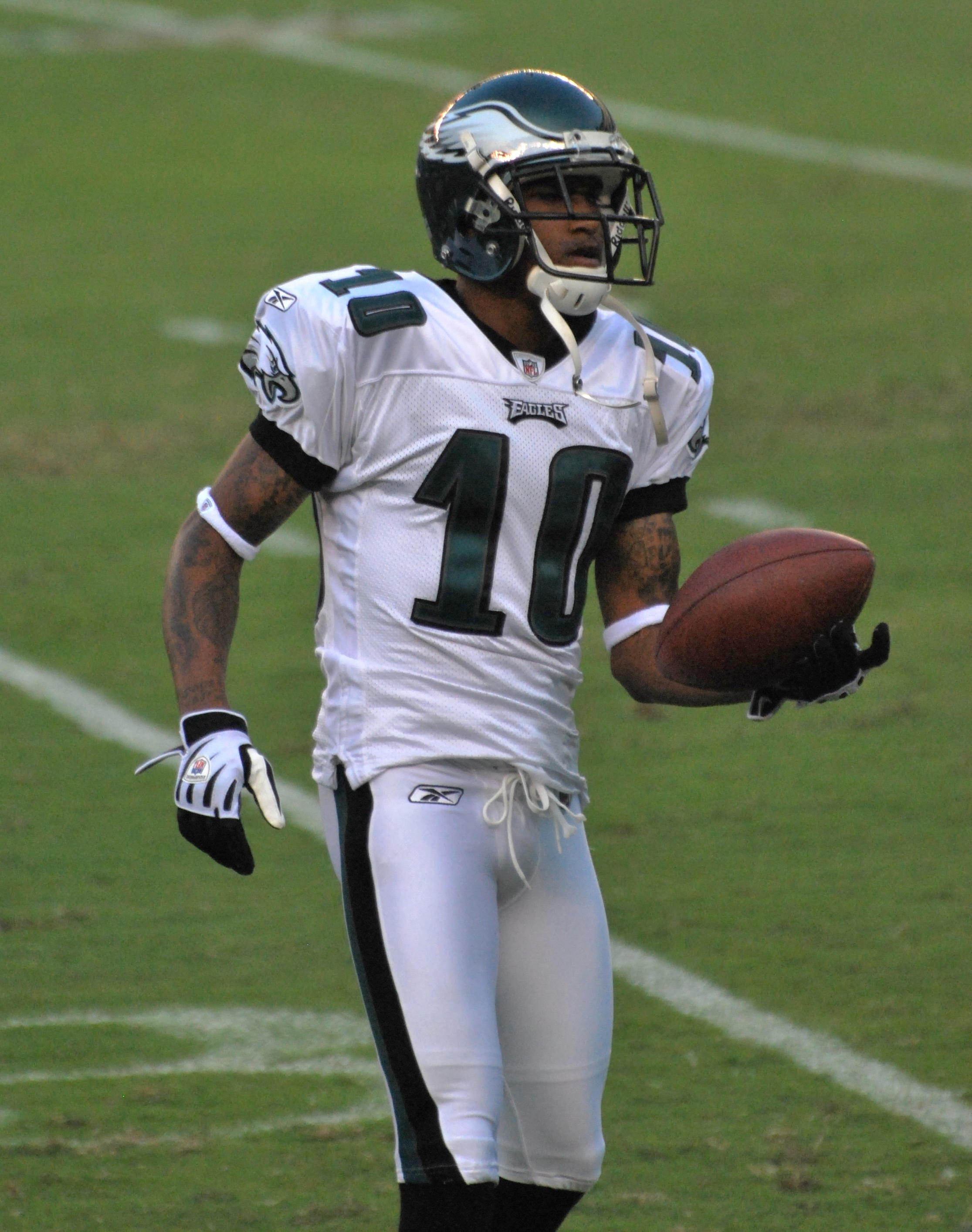
Jordy Nelson (top) and DeSean Jackson (bottom), two All-Pro receivers, were both taken in the second round

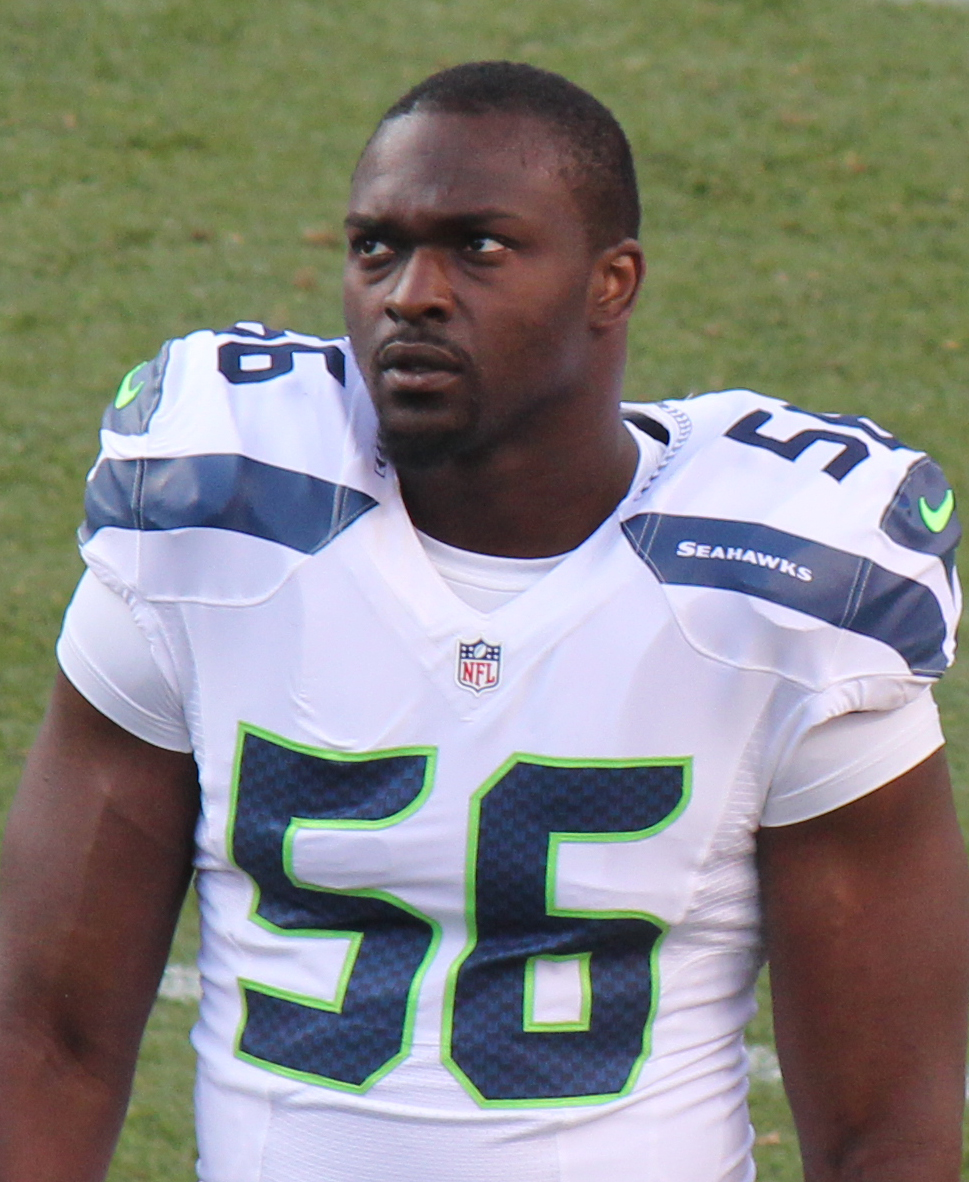
Defensive end Cliff Avril, drafted 92nd overall in the third round, won a Super Bowl with the Seattle Seahawks and was named to a Pro Bowl in 2016.

Rnd.	Pick	Team	Player	Pos.	College	Notes
1	1	Miami Dolphins	Jake Long ^{†}	T	Michigan	
1	2	St. Louis Rams	Chris Long	DE	Virginia	
1	3	Atlanta Falcons	Matt Ryan ^{†}	QB	Boston College	
1	4	Oakland Raiders	Darren McFadden	RB	Arkansas	
1	5	Kansas City Chiefs	Glenn Dorsey	DT	LSU	
1	6	New York Jets	Vernon Gholston	DE	Ohio State	
1	7	New Orleans Saints	Sedrick Ellis	DT	USC	from San Francisco via New England (Note: No. 7: San Francisco → New England → New Orleans. Multiple trades: San Francisco → New England (PD). San Francisco traded a first-round selection (7th overall) and a 2007 fourth-round selection to New England in exchange for a 2007 first-round selection. New England → New Orleans (D). New England traded first- and fifth-round selections (7th and 164th overall) to New Orleans in exchange for first- and third-round selections (10th and 78th overall).)
1	8	Jacksonville Jaguars	Derrick Harvey	DE	Florida	from Baltimore (Note: No. 8: Baltimore → Jacksonville (D). Baltimore traded a first-round selection (8th overall) to Jacksonville in exchange for a first-round selection, two third-round selections and a fourth-round selection (26th, 71st, 89th and 125th overall).)
1	9	Cincinnati Bengals	Keith Rivers	LB	USC	
1	10	New England Patriots	Jerod Mayo ^{†}	LB	Tennessee	from New Orleans (Note: No. 10: New Orleans → New England (D). See Round 1: No. 7: New England → New Orleans.)
1	11	Buffalo Bills	Leodis McKelvin	CB	Troy	
1	12	Denver Broncos	Ryan Clady ^{†}	T	Boise State	
1	13	Carolina Panthers	Jonathan Stewart ^{†}	RB	Oregon	
1	14	Chicago Bears	Chris Williams	T	Vanderbilt	
1	15	Kansas City Chiefs	Branden Albert ^{†}	T	Virginia	from Detroit (Note: No. 15: Detroit → Kansas City (D). Detroit traded first- and third-round selections (15th and 76th overall) to Kansas City in exchange for first-, third- and fifth-round selections (17th, 66th and 136th overall).)
1	16	Arizona Cardinals	Dominique Rodgers-Cromartie ^{†}	CB	Tennessee State	
1	17	Detroit Lions	Gosder Cherilus	T	Boston College	from Minnesota via Kansas City (Note: No. 17: Minnesota → Kansas City → Detroit. Multiple trades: Minnesota → Kansas City (PD). Minnesota traded a first-round selection, two third-round selections and a sixth-round selection (17th, 73rd, 82nd and 182nd overall) to Kansas City in exchange for a sixth-round selection (187th overall) and DE Jared Allen. Kansas City → Detroit (D). See Round 1: No. 15: Detroit → Kansas City.)
1	18	Baltimore Ravens	Joe Flacco ^{†}	QB	Delaware	from Houston (Note: No. 18: Houston → Baltimore (D). Houston traded a first-round selection (18th overall) to Baltimore in exchange for first-, third- and sixth-round selections (26th, 89th and 173rd overall).); Super Bowl XLVII MVP
1	19	Carolina Panthers	Jeff Otah	T	Pittsburgh	from Philadelphia (Note: No. 19: Philadelphia → Carolina (D). Philadelphia traded a first-round selection (19th overall) to Carolina in exchange for second- and fourth-round selections (43rd and 109th overall), and a 2009 first-round selection.)
1	20	Tampa Bay Buccaneers	Aqib Talib ^{†}	CB	Kansas	
1	21	Atlanta Falcons	Sam Baker	T	USC	from Washington (Note: No. 21: Washington → Atlanta (D). Washington traded first-, third- and fifth-round selections (21st, 84th and 154th overall) to Atlanta in exchange for two second-round selections and a fourth-round selection (34th, 48th and 103rd overall).)
1	22	Dallas Cowboys	Felix Jones	RB	Arkansas	from Cleveland (Note: No. 22: Cleveland → Dallas (PD). Cleveland traded a first-round selection (22nd overall) and a 2007 second-round selection to Dallas in exchange for a 2007 first-round selection.)
1	23	Pittsburgh Steelers	Rashard Mendenhall	RB	Illinois	
1	24	Tennessee Titans	Chris Johnson ^{†}	RB	East Carolina	
1	25	Dallas Cowboys	Mike Jenkins ^{†}	CB	South Florida	from Seattle (Note: No. 25: Seattle → Dallas (D). Seattle traded a first-round selection (25th overall) to Dallas in exchange for first-, fifth- and seventh-round selections (28th, 163rd and 235th overall).)
1	26	Houston Texans	Duane Brown ^{†}	T	Virginia Tech	from Jacksonville via Baltimore (Note: No. 26: Jacksonville → Baltimore → Houston. Multiple trades: Jacksonville → Baltimore (D). See Round 1: No. 8: Baltimore → Jacksonville. Baltimore → Houston (D). See Round 1: No. 18: Houston → Baltimore.)
1	27	San Diego Chargers	Antoine Cason	CB	Arizona	
1	28	Seattle Seahawks	Lawrence Jackson	DE	USC	from Dallas (Note: No. 28: Dallas → Seattle (D). See Round 1: No. 25: Seattle → Dallas.)
1	29	San Francisco 49ers	Kentwan Balmer	DT	North Carolina	from Indianapolis (Note: No. 29: Indianapolis → San Francisco (PD). Indianapolis traded a first-round selection (29th overall) and a 2007 fourth-round selection to San Francisco in exchange for a 2007 second-round selection.)
1	30	New York Jets	Dustin Keller	TE	Purdue	from Green Bay (Note: No. 30: Green Bay → NY Jets (D). Green Bay traded a first-round selection (30th overall) to the Jets in exchange for second- and fourth-round selections (36th and 113th overall).)
1	–	New England Patriots	selection forfeited			
1	31	New York Giants	Kenny Phillips	S	Miami (FL)	
2	32	Miami Dolphins	Phillip Merling	DE	Clemson	
2	33	St. Louis Rams	Donnie Avery	WR	Houston	
2	34	Washington Redskins	Devin Thomas	WR	Michigan State	from Oakland via Atlanta (Note: No. 34: Oakland → Atlanta → Washington. Multiple trades: Oakland → Atlanta (PD). Oakland traded a second-round selection (34th overall) and a 2009 fifth-round selection to Atlanta in exchange for CB DeAngelo Hall. Atlanta → Washington (D). See Round 1: No. 21: Washington → Atlanta.)
2	35	Kansas City Chiefs	Brandon Flowers ^{†}	CB	Virginia Tech	
2	36	Green Bay Packers	Jordy Nelson ^{†}	WR	Kansas State	from NY Jets (Note: No. 36: NY Jets → Green Bay (D). See Round 1: No. 30: Green Bay → NY Jets.)
2	37	Atlanta Falcons	Curtis Lofton	LB	Oklahoma	
2	38	Seattle Seahawks	John Carlson	TE	Notre Dame	from Baltimore (Note: No. 38: Baltimore → Seattle (D). Baltimore traded a second-round selection (38th overall) to Seattle in exchange for second- and third-round selections (55th and 86th overall).)
2	39	San Francisco 49ers	Chilo Rachal	G	USC	
2	40	New Orleans Saints	Tracy Porter	CB	Indiana	
2	41	Buffalo Bills	James Hardy	WR	Indiana	
2	42	Denver Broncos	Eddie Royal	WR	Virginia Tech	
2	43	Minnesota Vikings	Tyrell Johnson	S	Arkansas State	from Carolina via Philadelphia (Note: No. 43: Carolina → Philadelphia → Minnesota. Multiple trades: Carolina → Philadelphia (D). See Round 1: No. 19: Philadelphia → Carolina. Philadelphia → Minnesota (D). Philadelphia traded second- and fifth-round selections (43rd and 152nd overall) to Minnesota in exchange for second- and fourth-round selections (47th and 117th overall).)
2	44	Chicago Bears	Matt Forte ^{†}	RB	Tulane	
2	45	Detroit Lions	Jordon Dizon	LB	Colorado	
2	46	Cincinnati Bengals	Jerome Simpson	WR	Coastal Carolina	
2	47	Philadelphia Eagles	Trevor Laws	DT	Notre Dame	from Minnesota (Note: No. 47: Minnesota → Philadelphia (D). See Round 2: No. 43: Philadelphia → Minnesota.)
2	48	Washington Redskins	Fred Davis	TE	USC	from Houston via Atlanta (Note: No. 48: Houston → Atlanta → Washington. Multiple trades: Houston → Atlanta (PD). Houston traded a second-round selection (48th overall), and 2007 first- and second-round selections to Atlanta in exchange for a 2007 first-round selection and QB Matt Schaub. Atlanta → Washington (D). See Round 1: No. 21: Washington → Atlanta.)
2	49	Philadelphia Eagles	DeSean Jackson ^{†}	WR	California	
2	50	Arizona Cardinals	Calais Campbell ^{†}	DE	Miami (FL)	
2	51	Washington Redskins	Malcolm Kelly	WR	Oklahoma	
2	52	Jacksonville Jaguars	Quentin Groves	DE	Auburn	from Tampa Bay (Note: No. 52: Tampa Bay → Jacksonville (D). Tampa Bay traded a second-round selection (52nd overall) to Jacksonville in exchange for second- and fifth-round selections (58th and 158th overall), and a 2009 seventh-round selection.)
2	53	Pittsburgh Steelers	Limas Sweed	WR	Texas	
2	54	Tennessee Titans	Jason Jones	DT	Eastern Michigan	
2	55	Baltimore Ravens	Ray Rice ^{†}	RB	Rutgers	from Seattle (Note: No. 55: Seattle → Baltimore (D). See Round 2: No. 38: Baltimore → Seattle.)
2	56	Green Bay Packers	Brian Brohm	QB	Louisville	from Cleveland (Note: No. 56: Cleveland → Green Bay (PD). Cleveland traded a second-round selection (56th overall) to the Green Bay Packers in exchange for DT Corey Williams.)
2	57	Miami Dolphins	Chad Henne	QB	Michigan	from San Diego (Note: No. 57: San Diego → Miami (PD). San Diego traded a second-round selection (57th overall) to Miami in exchange for WR Chris Chambers.)
2	58	Tampa Bay Buccaneers	Dexter Jackson	WR	Appalachian State	from Jacksonville (Note: No. 58: Jacksonville → Tampa Bay (D). See Round 2: No. 52: Tampa Bay → Jacksonville.)
2	59	Indianapolis Colts	Mike Pollak	C	Arizona State	
2	60	Green Bay Packers	Patrick Lee	CB	Auburn	
2	61	Dallas Cowboys	Martellus Bennett ^{†}	TE	Texas A&M	
2	62	New England Patriots	Terrence Wheatley	CB	Colorado	
2	63	New York Giants	Terrell Thomas	CB	USC	
3	64	Detroit Lions	Kevin Smith	RB	UCF	from Miami (Note: No. 64: Miami → Detroit (D). Miami traded a third-round selection (64th overall) to Detroit in exchange for third- and sixth-round selections (66th and 176th overall).)
3	65	St. Louis Rams	John Greco	T	Toledo	
3	66	Miami Dolphins	Kendall Langford	DE	Hampton	from Kansas City via Detroit (Note: No. 66: Kansas City → Detroit → Miami. Multiple trades: Kansas City → Detroit (D). See Round 1: No. 15: Detroit → Kansas City. Detroit → Miami (D). See Round 3: No. 64: Miami → Detroit.)
3	67	Carolina Panthers	Charles Godfrey	CB	Iowa	from NY Jets (Note: No. 67: NY Jets → Carolina (PD). The NY Jets traded third- and fifth-round selections (67th and 141st overall) to Carolina in exchange for DT Kris Jenkins.)
3	68	Atlanta Falcons	Chevis Jackson	CB	LSU	
3	69	San Diego Chargers	Jacob Hester	RB	LSU	from Oakland via New England (Note: No. 69: Oakland → New England → San Diego. Multiple trades: Oakland → New England (PD). Oakland traded a third-round selection (69th overall) and a 2007 seventh-round selection to New England in exchange for a 2007 third-round selection. New England → San Diego (D). New England traded a third-round selection (69th overall) to San Diego in exchange for a fifth-round selection (160th overall) and a 2009 second-round selection.)
3	70	Chicago Bears	Earl Bennett	WR	Vanderbilt	from San Francisco (Note: No. 70: San Francisco → Chicago (PD). As penalty for tampering with Bears linebacker Lance Briggs, NFL commissioner Roger Goodell ordered San Francisco to swap its third-round selection with Chicago's, and to forfeit its fifth-round selection.)
3	71	Baltimore Ravens	Tavares Gooden	LB	Miami (FL)	from Baltimore via Buffalo and Jacksonville (Note: No. 71: Baltimore → Buffalo → Jacksonville → Baltimore. Multiple trades: Baltimore → Buffalo (PD). Baltimore traded a third-round selection (71st overall), and 2007 third- and seventh-round selections to Buffalo in exchange for RB Willis McGahee. Buffalo → Jacksonville (PD). Buffalo traded third- and fifth-round selections (71st and 143rd overall) to Jacksonville in exchange for DT Marcus Stroud. Jacksonville → Baltimore (D). See Round 1: No. 8: Baltimore → Jacksonville.)
3	72	Buffalo Bills	Chris Ellis	DE	Virginia Tech	
3	73	Kansas City Chiefs	Jamaal Charles ^{†}	RB	Texas	from Denver via Minnesota (Note: No. 73: Denver → Minnesota → Kansas City. Multiple trades: Denver → Minnesota (PD). Denver traded a third-round selection (73rd overall), and 2007 sixth- and seventh-round selections selections to Minnesota in exchange for a 2007 fourth-round selection. Minnesota → Kansas City (PD). See Round 1: No. 17: Minnesota → Kansas City.)
3	74	Carolina Panthers	Dan Connor	LB	Penn State	
3	75	San Francisco 49ers	Reggie Smith	CB	Oklahoma	from Chicago (Note: No. 75: Chicago → San Francisco (PD). See Round 3: No. 70: San Francisco → Chicago.)
3	76	Kansas City Chiefs	Brad Cottam	TE	Tennessee	from Detroit (Note: No. 76: Detroit → Kansas City (D). See Round 1: No. 15: Detroit → Kansas City.)
3	77	Cincinnati Bengals	Pat Sims	DT	Auburn	
3	78	New England Patriots	Shawn Crable	LB	Michigan	from New Orleans (Note: No. 78: New Orleans → New England (D). See Round 1: No. 7: New England → New Orleans.)
3	79	Houston Texans	Antwaun Molden	CB	Eastern Kentucky	
3	80	Philadelphia Eagles	Bryan Smith	DE	McNeese State	
3	81	Arizona Cardinals	Early Doucet	WR	LSU	
3	82	Kansas City Chiefs	DaJuan Morgan	S	NC State	from Minnesota (Note: No. 82: Minnesota → Kansas City (PD). See Round 1: No. 17: Minnesota → Kansas City.)
3	83	Tampa Bay Buccaneers	Jeremy Zuttah ^{†}	C	Rutgers	
3	84	Atlanta Falcons	Harry Douglas	WR	Louisville	from Washington (Note: No. 84: Washington → Atlanta (D). See Round 1: No. 21: Washington → Atlanta.)
3	85	Tennessee Titans	Craig Stevens	TE	California	
3	86	Baltimore Ravens	Tom Zbikowski	S	Notre Dame	from Seattle (Note: No. 86: Seattle → Baltimore (D). See Round 2: No. 38: Baltimore → Seattle.)
3	87	Detroit Lions	Andre Fluellen	DT	Florida State	from Cleveland (Note: No. 87: Cleveland → Detroit (PD). Cleveland traded a third-round selection (87th overall) and CB Leigh Bodden to Detroit in exchange for DT Shaun Rogers.)
3	88	Pittsburgh Steelers	Bruce Davis	OLB	UCLA	
3	89	Houston Texans	Steve Slaton	RB	West Virginia	from Jacksonville via Baltimore (Note: No. 89: Jacksonville → Baltimore → Houston. Multiple trades: Jacksonville → Baltimore (D). See Round 1: No. 8: Baltimore → Jacksonville. Baltimore → Houston (D). See Round 1: No. 18: Houston → Baltimore.)
3	90	Chicago Bears	Marcus Harrison	DT	Arkansas	from San Diego (Note: No. 90: San Diego → Chicago (PD). San Diego traded a third-round selection (90th overall), and 2007 second-, third- and fifth-round selections to Chicago in exchange for a 2007 second-round selection.)
3	91	Green Bay Packers	Jermichael Finley	TE	Texas	
3	92	Detroit Lions	Cliff Avril ^{†}	DE	Purdue	from Dallas (Note: No. 92: Dallas → Detroit (D). Dallas traded a third-round selection (92nd overall) to Detroit in exchange for a fourth-round selection (111th overall) and a 2009 fourth-round selection.)
3	93	Indianapolis Colts	Philip Wheeler	LB	Georgia Tech	
3	94	New England Patriots	Kevin O'Connell	QB	San Diego State	
3	95	New York Giants	Mario Manningham	WR	Michigan	
3*	96	Washington Redskins	Chad Rinehart	T	Northern Iowa	
3*	97	Cincinnati Bengals	Andre Caldwell	WR	Florida	
3*	98	Atlanta Falcons	Thomas DeCoud ^{†}	S	California	
3*	99	Baltimore Ravens	Oniel Cousins	T	UTEP	
4	100	Oakland Raiders	Tyvon Branch	CB	Connecticut	from Miami via Dallas (Note: No. 100: Miami → Dallas → Oakland. Multiple trades: Miami → Dallas (PD). Miami traded a fourth-round selection (100th overall) to Dallas in exchange for LB Akin Ayodele and TE Anthony Fasano. (Note: "Dolphins add some Cowboys, acquire two from Dallas for draft pick". CBS.Sportsline.com. Associated Press. April 26, 2008.) Dallas → Oakland (D). Dallas traded a fourth-round selection (100th overall) to Oakland in exchange for fourth- and seventh-round selections (104th and 213th overall).)
4	101	St. Louis Rams	Justin King	CB	Penn State	
4	102	Green Bay Packers	Jeremy Thompson	DE	Wake Forest	from NY Jets (Note: No. 102: NY Jets → Green Bay (D). Green Bay traded fourth- and fifth-round selections (113th and 162nd overall) to the NY Jets in exchange for a fourth-round selection (102nd overall).)
4	103	Tennessee Titans	William Hayes	DE	Winston-Salem State	from Atlanta via Washington (Note: No. 103: Atlanta → Washington → Tennessee. Multiple trades: Atlanta → Washington (D). See Round 1: No. 21: Washington → Atlanta. Washington → Tennessee (D). Washington traded a fourth-round selection (103rd overall) to Tennessee in exchange for fourth- and fifth-round selections (124th and 157th overall).)
4	104	Cleveland Browns	Beau Bell	LB	UNLV	from Oakland via Dallas (Note: No. 104: Oakland → Dallas → Cleveland. Multiple trades: Oakland → Dallas (D). See Round 4: No. 100: Dallas → Oakland. Dallas → Cleveland (D). Dallas traded a fourth-round selection (104th overall) to Cleveland in exchange for fourth- and fifth-round selections (122nd and 155th overall).)
4	105	Kansas City Chiefs	William Franklin	WR	Missouri	
4	106	Baltimore Ravens	Marcus Smith	WR	New Mexico	
4	107	San Francisco 49ers	Cody Wallace	C	Texas A&M	
4	108	Denver Broncos	Kory Lichtensteiger	C	Bowling Green	
4	109	Philadelphia Eagles	Mike McGlynn	G	Pittsburgh	from Carolina (Note: No. 109: Carolina → Philadelphia (D). See Round 1: No. 19: Philadelphia → Carolina.)
4	110	Miami Dolphins	Shawn Murphy	T	Utah State	from Chicago (Note: No. 110: Chicago → Miami (D). Chicago traded a fourth-round selection (110th overall) to Miami in exchange for fourth- and seventh-round selections (115th and 208th overall).)
4	111	Cleveland Browns	Martin Rucker	TE	Missouri	from Detroit via Dallas (Note: No. 111: Detroit → Dallas → Cleveland. Multiple trades: Detroit → Dallas (D). See Round 3: No. 92: Dallas → Detroit. Dallas → Cleveland (D). Dallas traded a fourth-round selection (111th overall) to Cleveland in exchange for a 2009 third-round selection.)
4	112	Cincinnati Bengals	Anthony Collins	T	Kansas	
4	113	New York Jets	Dwight Lowery	CB	San Jose State	from New Orleans via NY Jets and Green Bay (Note: No. 113: New Orleans → NY Jets → Green Bay → NY Jets. Multiple trades: New Orleans → NY Jets (PD). New Orleans traded a fourth-round selection (113th overall) to the NY Jets in exchange for a 2009 conditional selection and LB Jonathan Vilma. NY Jets → Green Bay (D). See Round 1: No. 30: Green Bay → NY Jets. Green Bay → NY Jets (D). See Round 4: No. 102: NY Jets → Green Bay.)
4	114	Buffalo Bills	Reggie Corner	CB	Akron	
4	115	Tampa Bay Buccaneers	Dre Moore	DT	Maryland	from Philadelphia via Miami and Chicago (Note: No. 115: Philadelphia → Miami → Chicago → Tampa Bay. Multiple trades: Philadelphia → Miami (D). Philadelphia traded a fourth-round selection (115th overall) to Miami in exchange for RB Lorenzo Booker. Miami → Chicago (D). See Round 4: No. 110: Chicago → Miami. Chicago → Tampa Bay (D). Chicago traded fourth- and sixth-round selections (115th and 175th overall) to Tampa Bay in exchange for fourth- and fifth-round selections (120th and 158th overall).)
4	116	Arizona Cardinals	Kenny Iwebema	DE	Iowa	
4	117	Philadelphia Eagles	Quintin Demps	S	UTEP	from Minnesota (Note: No. 117: Minnesota → Philadelphia (D). See Round 2: No. 43: Philadelphia → Minnesota.)
4	118	Houston Texans	Xavier Adibi	LB	Virginia Tech	
4	119	Denver Broncos	Jack Williams	CB	Kent State	from Washington (Note: No. 119: Washington → Denver (PD). Washington traded a fourth-round selection (119th overall) and a 2007 third-round selection to Denver in a three-way trade with Atlanta; Washington received RB T. J. Duckett and Atlanta received WR Ashley Lelie.)
4	120	Chicago Bears	Craig Steltz	S	LSU	from Tampa Bay (Note: No. 120: Tampa Bay → Chicago (D). See Round 4: No. 115: Chicago → Tampa Bay.)
4	121	Seattle Seahawks	Red Bryant	DT	Texas A&M	
4	122	Dallas Cowboys	Tashard Choice	RB	Georgia Tech	from Cleveland (Note: No. 122: Cleveland → Dallas (D). See Round 4: No. 104: Dallas → Cleveland.)
4	123	New York Giants	Bryan Kehl	LB	BYU	from Pittsburgh (Note: No. 123: Pittsburgh → NY Giants (D). Pittsburgh traded a fourth-round selection (123rd overall) to the NY Giants in exchange for fourth- and sixth-round selections (130th and 194th overall).)
4	124	Washington Redskins	Justin Tryon	CB	Arizona State	from Tennessee (Note: No. 124: Tennessee → Washington (D). See Round 4: No. 103: Washington → Tennessee.)
4	–	San Diego Chargers	selection forfeited during the 2007 Supplemental draft			
4	125	Oakland Raiders	Arman Shields	WR	Richmond	from Jacksonville via Baltimore (Note: No. 125: Jacksonville → Baltimore → Oakland. Multiple trades: Jacksonville → Baltimore (D). See Round 1: No. 8: Baltimore → Jacksonville. Baltimore → Oakland (D). Baltimore traded a fourth-round selection (125th overall) to Oakland in exchange for CB Fabian Washington.)
4	126	Tennessee Titans	Lavelle Hawkins	WR	California	from Dallas (Note: No. 126: Dallas → Tennessee (PD). Dallas traded a fourth-round selection (126th overall) to Tennessee in exchange for CB Adam Jones.)
4	127	Indianapolis Colts	Jacob Tamme	TE	Kentucky	
4	128	St. Louis Rams	Keenan Burton	WR	Kentucky	from Green Bay (Note: No. 128: Green Bay → St. Louis (D). Green Bay traded a fourth-round selection (128th overall) to St. Louis in exchange for fifth- and seventh-round selections (137th and 217th overall).)
4	129	New England Patriots	Jonathan Wilhite	CB	Auburn	
4	130	Pittsburgh Steelers	Tony Hills	T	Texas	from NY Giants (Note: No. 130: NY Giants → Pittsburgh (D). See Round 4: No. 123: Pittsburgh → NY Giants.)
4*	131	Philadelphia Eagles	Jack Ikegwuonu	CB	Wisconsin	
4*	132	Buffalo Bills	Derek Fine	TE	Kansas	
4*	133	Baltimore Ravens	David Hale	T	Weber State	
4*	134	Tennessee Titans	Stanford Keglar	LB	Purdue	
4*	135	Green Bay Packers	Josh Sitton ^{†}	G	UCF	
5	136	Detroit Lions	Kenneth Moore	WR	Wake Forest	from Miami via Kansas City (Note: No. 136: Miami → Kansas City → Detroit. Multiple trades: Miami → Kansas City (PD). Miami traded a conditional fifth-round selection (136th overall) to Kansas City in exchange for QB Trent Green. The selection would have been upgraded to a fourth-round selection if Green had met certain performance criteria; however, Green was injured in a game against the Houston Texans in week 5 and was placed on the injured reserve list for the remainder of the season. Kansas City → Detroit (D). See Round 1: No. 15: Detroit → Kansas City.)
5	137	Minnesota Vikings	John David Booty	QB	USC	from St. Louis via Green Bay (Note: No. 137: St. Louis → Green Bay → Minnesota. Multiple trades: St. Louis → Green Bay (D). See Round 4: No. 128: Green Bay → St. Louis. Green Bay → Minnesota (D). Green Bay traded a fifth-round selection (137th overall) to Minnesota in exchange for fifth- and seventh-round selections (150th and 209th overall).)
5	138	Atlanta Falcons	Robert James	LB	Arizona State	
5	139	Denver Broncos	Ryan Torain	RB	Arizona State	from Oakland (Note: No. 139: Oakland → Denver (PD). Oakland traded a conditional fifth-round selection (139th overall) to Denver in exchange for DT Gerard Warren.)
5	140	Kansas City Chiefs	Brandon Carr	CB	Grand Valley State	
5	141	Carolina Panthers	Gary Barnidge ^{†}	TE	Louisville	from NY Jets (Note: No. 141: NY Jets → Carolina (PD). See Round 3: No. 67: NY Jets → Carolina.)
5	–	San Francisco 49ers	selection forfeited			
5	–	Baltimore Ravens	selection forfeited during the 2007 Supplemental draft			
5	142	Chicago Bears	Zackary Bowman	CB	Nebraska	from Carolina (Note: No. 142: Carolina → Chicago (PD). Carolina traded a fifth-round selection (142nd overall) to Chicago in exchange for S Chris Harris.)
5	143	Dallas Cowboys	Orlando Scandrick	CB	Boise State	from Chicago via Buffalo and Jacksonville (Note: No. 143: Chicago → Buffalo → Jacksonville → Dallas. Multiple trades: Chicago → Buffalo (PD). Chicago traded a conditional fifth-round selection (143rd overall) to Buffalo in exchange for DT Darwin Walker. The round of the selection was dependent on Walker's playing time. Buffalo → Jacksonville (PD). See Round 3: No. 71: Buffalo → Jacksonville. Jacksonville → Dallas (D). Jacksonville traded a fifth-round selection (143rd overall) to Dallas in exchange for fifth- and seventh-round selections (155th and 213th overall).)
5	144	New Orleans Saints	DeMario Pressley	DT	NC State	from Detroit (Note: No. 144: Detroit → New Orleans (D). Detroit traded a fifth-round selection (144th overall) to New Orleans in exchange for fifth- and seventh-round selections (146th and 218th overall).)
5	145	Cincinnati Bengals	Jason Shirley	DT	Fresno State	
5	146	Detroit Lions	Jerome Felton ^{†}	FB	Furman	from New Orleans (Note: No. 146: New Orleans → Detroit (D). See Round 5: No. 144: Detroit → New Orleans.)
5	147	Buffalo Bills	Alvin Bowen	LB	Iowa State	
5	148	Denver Broncos	Carlton Powell	DT	Virginia Tech	
5	149	Arizona Cardinals	Tim Hightower	RB	Richmond	
5	150	Green Bay Packers	Breno Giacomini	T	Louisville	from Minnesota (Note: No. 150: Minnesota → Green Bay (D). See Round 5: No. 137: Green Bay → Minnesota.)
5	151	Houston Texans	Frank Okam	DT	Texas	
5	152	Minnesota Vikings	Letroy Guion	DT	Florida State	from Philadelphia (Note: No. 152: Philadelphia → Minnesota (D). See Round 2: No. 43: Philadelphia → Minnesota.)
5	153	New England Patriots	Matthew Slater ^{†}	WR	UCLA	from Tampa Bay (Note: No. 153: Tampa Bay → New England (D). New England traded fifth- and seventh-round selections (160th and 238th overall) to Tampa Bay in exchange for a fifth-round selection (153rd overall).)
5	154	Atlanta Falcons	Kroy Biermann	DE	Montana	from Washington (Note: No. 154: Washington → Atlanta (D). See Round 1: No. 21: Washington → Atlanta.)
5	155	Jacksonville Jaguars	Thomas Williams	LB	USC	from Cleveland via Dallas (Note: No. 155: Cleveland → Dallas → Jacksonville. Multiple trades: Cleveland → Dallas (D). See Round 4: No. 104: Dallas → Cleveland. Dallas → Jacksonville (D). See Round 5: No. 143: Jacksonville → Dallas.)
5	156	Pittsburgh Steelers	Dennis Dixon	QB	Oregon	
5	157	St. Louis Rams	Roy Schuening	G	Oregon State	from Tennessee via Washington (Note: No. 157: Tennessee → Washington → St. Louis. Multiple trades: Tennessee → Washington (D). See Round 4: No. 103: Washington → Tennessee. Washington → St. Louis (D). Washington traded fifth- and seventh-round selections (157th and 228th overall) to St. Louis in exchange for two sixth-round selections (168th and 180th overall).)
5	158	Chicago Bears	Kellen Davis	TE	Michigan State	from Seattle via Jacksonville and Tampa Bay (Note: No. 158: Seattle → Jacksonville → Tampa Bay → Chicago. Multiple trades: Seattle → Jacksonville (PD). Seattle traded a fifth-round selection (158th overall) to Jacksonville in exchange for a seventh-round selection (233rd overall) and RB Alvin Pearman. Jacksonville → Tampa Bay (D). See Round 2: No. 52: Tampa Bay → Jacksonville. Tampa Bay → Chicago (D). See Round 4: No. 115: Chicago → Tampa Bay.)
5	159	Jacksonville Jaguars	Trae Williams	CB	South Florida	
5	160	Tampa Bay Buccaneers	Josh Johnson	QB	San Diego	from San Diego via New England (Note: No. 160: San Diego → New England → Tampa Bay. Multiple trades: San Diego → New England (D). See Round 3: No. 69: New England → San Diego. New England → Tampa Bay (D). See Round 5: No. 153: Tampa Bay → New England.)
5	161	Indianapolis Colts	Marcus Howard	DE	Georgia	
5	162	New York Jets	Erik Ainge	QB	Tennessee	from Green Bay (Note: No. 162: Green Bay → NY Jets (D). See Round 4: No. 102: NY Jets → Green Bay.)
5	163	Seattle Seahawks	Owen Schmitt	FB	West Virginia	from Dallas (Note: No. 163: Seattle → Dallas (D). See Round 1: No. 25: Seattle → Dallas.)
5	164	New Orleans Saints	Carl Nicks ^{†}	T	Nebraska	from New England (Note: No. 164: New England → New Orleans (D). See Round 1: No. 7: New England → New Orleans.)
5	165	New York Giants	Jonathan Goff	LB	Vanderbilt	
5*	166	San Diego Chargers	Marcus Thomas	RB	UTEP	
6	167	Dallas Cowboys	Erik Walden	DE	Middle Tennessee	from Miami (Note: No. 167: Miami → Dallas (PD). Dallas and Miami exchanged their sixth-round selections in a trade with Jason Ferguson going to the Dolphins as part of the deal. (Note: "Cowboys deal Ferguson to Miami". seattlepi.com. February 29, 2008.))
6	168	Washington Redskins	Durant Brooks	P	Georgia Tech	from St. Louis (Note: No. 168: St. Louis → Washington (D). See Round 5: No. 157: Washington → St. Louis.)
6	169	Oakland Raiders	Trevor Scott	DE	Buffalo	
6	170	Kansas City Chiefs	Barry Richardson	T	Clemson	
6	171	New York Jets	Marcus Henry	WR	Kansas	
6	172	Atlanta Falcons	Thomas Brown	RB	Georgia	
6	173	Houston Texans	Dominique Barber	S	Minnesota	from Baltimore (Note: No. 173: Baltimore → Houston (D). See Round 1: No. 18: Houston → Baltimore.)
6	174	San Francisco 49ers	Josh Morgan	WR	Virginia Tech	
6	175	Tampa Bay Buccaneers	Geno Hayes	LB	Florida State	from Chicago (Note: No. 175: Chicago → Tampa Bay (D). See Round 4: No. 115: Chicago → Tampa Bay.)
6	176	Miami Dolphins	Jalen Parmele	RB	Toledo	from Detroit (Note: No. 176: Detroit → Miami (D). See Round 3: No. 64: Miami → Detroit.)
6	177	Cincinnati Bengals	Corey Lynch	S	Appalachian State	
6	178	New Orleans Saints	Taylor Mehlhaff	K	Wisconsin	
6	179	Buffalo Bills	Xavier Omon	RB	Northwest Missouri State	
6	180	Washington Redskins	Kareem Moore	S	Nicholls State	from Denver via St. Louis (Note: No. 180: Denver → St. Louis → Washington. Multiple trades: Denver → St. Louis (PD). Denver traded a sixth-round selection (180th overall) to St. Louis in exchange for DT Jimmy Kennedy. The trade occurred after the Broncos had tried to trade the same selection to Miami for DT Dan Wilkinson; that trade was voided. Washington → St. Louis (D). See Round 5: No. 157: Washington → St. Louis.)
6	181	Carolina Panthers	Nick Hayden	DT	Wisconsin	
6	182	Kansas City Chiefs	Kevin Robinson	WR	Utah State	from Minnesota (Note: No. 182: Minnesota → Kansas City (PD). See Round 1: No. 17: Minnesota → Kansas City.)
6	183	Denver Broncos	Spencer Larsen	LB	Arizona	from Houston (Note: No. 183: Houston → Denver (PD). Houston traded a sixth-round selection (183rd overall) to Denver in exchange for C Chris Myers. (Note: "The Sports Network – National Football League". Sportsnetwork.com.))
6	184	Philadelphia Eagles	Mike Gibson	T	California	
6	185	Arizona Cardinals	Chris Harrington	DE	Texas A&M	
6	186	Washington Redskins	Colt Brennan	QB	Hawaii	
6	187	Minnesota Vikings	John Sullivan	C	Notre Dame	from Tampa Bay via Kansas City (Note: No. 187: Tampa Bay → Kansas City → Minnesota. Multiple trades: Tampa Bay → Kansas City (PD). Tampa Bay traded a sixth-round selection (187th overall) to Kansas City in exchange for NT Ryan Sims and RB Michael Bennett. Kansas City → Minnesota (PD). See Round 1: No. 17: Minnesota → Kansas City.)
6	188	Pittsburgh Steelers	Mike Humpal	LB	Iowa	
6	189	Seattle Seahawks	Tyler Schmitt	LS	San Diego State	from Tennessee (Note: No. 189: Tennessee → Seattle (PD). Tennessee traded a sixth-round selection (189th overall) to Seattle in exchange for DE Bryce Fisher.)
6	190	Cleveland Browns	Ahtyba Rubin	DT	Iowa State	from Seattle (Note: No. 190: Seattle → Cleveland (PD). Seattle traded a sixth-round selection (190th overall) to Cleveland in exchange for QB Charlie Frye.)
6	191	Cleveland Browns	Paul Hubbard	WR	Wisconsin	from Cleveland via Philadelphia (Note: No. 191: Cleveland → Philadelphia → Cleveland. Multiple trades: Cleveland → Philadelphia (PD). Cleveland traded a sixth-round selection (191st overall) to Philadelphia in exchange for C Hank Fraley. The trade was conditional on games started by Fraley, and could have fallen to a seventh-round pick, but Fraley started all 16 games. Philadelphia → Cleveland (D). Philadelphia traded a sixth-round selection (191st overall) to Cleveland in exchange for a 2009 fifth-round selection.)
6	192	San Diego Chargers	DeJuan Tribble	CB	Boston College	
6	193	Minnesota Vikings	Jaymar Johnson	WR	Jackson State	from Jacksonville (Note: No. 193: Jacksonville → Minnesota (PD). Jacksonville traded a sixth-round selection (193rd overall) to Minnesota in exchange for WR Troy Williamson.)
6	194	Pittsburgh Steelers	Ryan Mundy	S	West Virginia	from Green Bay via NY Giants (Note: No. 194: Green Bay → NY Giants → Pittsburgh. Multiple trades: Green Bay → NY Giants (PD). Green Bay traded a sixth-round selection (194th overall) to the NY Giants in exchange for RB Ryan Grant. NY Giants → Pittsburgh (D). See Round 4: No. 123: Pittsburgh → NY Giants.)
6	195	Miami Dolphins	Donald Thomas	G	Connecticut	from Dallas (Note: No. 195: Dallas → Miami (PD). See Round 6: No. 167: Miami → Dallas.)
6	196	Indianapolis Colts	Tom Santi	TE	Virginia	
6	197	New England Patriots	Bo Ruud	LB	Nebraska	
6	198	New York Giants	Andre' Woodson	QB	Kentucky	
6*	199	New York Giants	Robert Henderson	DE	Southern Miss	
6*	200	Philadelphia Eagles	Joe Mays	LB	North Dakota State	
6*	201	Indianapolis Colts	Steve Justice	C	Wake Forest	
6*	202	Indianapolis Colts	Mike Hart	RB	Michigan	
6*	203	Philadelphia Eagles	Andy Studebaker	DE	Wheaton (IL)	
6*	204	Miami Dolphins	Lex Hilliard	RB	Montana	
6*	205	Indianapolis Colts	Pierre Garçon	WR	Mount Union	
6*	206	Baltimore Ravens	Haruki Nakamura	S	Cincinnati	
6*	207	Cincinnati Bengals	Matt Sherry	TE	Villanova	
7	208	Chicago Bears	Ervin Baldwin	DE	Michigan State	from Miami (Note: No. 208: Miami → Chicago (D). See Round 4: No. 110: Chicago → Miami.)
7	209	Green Bay Packers	Matt Flynn	QB	LSU	from St. Louis via Minnesota (Note: No. 209: St. Louis → Minnesota → Green Bay. Multiple trades: St. Louis → Minnesota (PD). St. Louis traded a seventh-round selection (209th overall) to Minnesota in exchange for OT Adam Goldberg. Minnesota → Green Bay (D). See Round 5: Green Bay → Minnesota.)
7	210	Kansas City Chiefs	Brian Johnston	DE	Gardner–Webb	
7	211	New York Jets	Nate Garner	T	Arkansas	
7	212	Atlanta Falcons	Wilrey Fontenot	CB	Arizona	
7	213	Jacksonville Jaguars	Chauncey Washington	RB	USC	from Oakland via Dallas (Note: No. 213: Oakland → Dallas → Jacksonville. Multiple trades: Oakland → Dallas (D). See Round 4: No. 100: Dallas → Oakland. Dallas → Jacksonville (D). See Round 5: No. 143: Jacksonville → Dallas.)
7	214	San Francisco 49ers	Larry Grant	LB	Ohio State	
7	215	Baltimore Ravens	Justin Harper	WR	Virginia Tech	
7	216	Detroit Lions	Landon Cohen	DT	Ohio	
7	217	Green Bay Packers	Brett Swain	WR	San Diego State	from Cincinnati via St. Louis (Note: No. 217: Cincinnati → St. Louis → Green Bay. Multiple trades: Cincinnati → St. Louis (PD). Cincinnati traded a seventh-round selection (217th overall) to St. Louis in exchange for QB Ryan Fitzpatrick. St. Louis → Green Bay (D). See Round 4: No. 128: Green Bay → St. Louis.)
7	218	Detroit Lions	Caleb Campbell	S	Army	from New Orleans (Note: No. 218: New Orleans → Detroit (D). See Round 5: No. 144: Detroit → New Orleans.)
7	219	Buffalo Bills	Demetress Bell	T	Northwestern State	
7	220	Denver Broncos	Josh Barrett	S	Arizona State	
7	221	Carolina Panthers	Hilee Taylor	LB	North Carolina	
7	222	Chicago Bears	Chester Adams	G	Georgia	
7	223	Houston Texans	Alex Brink	QB	Washington State	
7	224	Buffalo Bills	Stevie Johnson	WR	Kentucky	from Philadelphia (Note: No. 224: Philadelphia → Buffalo (PD). Philadelphia traded a seventh-round selection (224th overall) and DT Darwin Walker to Buffalo in exchange for LB Takeo Spikes and QB Kelly Holcomb.)
7	225	Arizona Cardinals	Brandon Keith	T	Northern Iowa	
7	226	Oakland Raiders	Chaz Schilens	WR	San Diego State	from Minnesota via NY Jets (Note: No. 226: Minnesota → NY Jets → Oakland. Multiple trades: Minnesota → NY Jets (PD). Minnesota traded a seventh-round selection (226th overall) and DT C. J. Mosley to the NY Jets in exchange for QB Brooks Bollinger. NY Jets → Oakland (PD). The NY Jets traded a seventh-round selection (226th overall) to Oakland in exchange for DE Bobby Hamilton.)
7	227	Denver Broncos	Peyton Hillis	FB	Arkansas	from Tampa Bay (Note: No. 227: Tampa Bay → Denver (PD). Tampa Bay traded a conditional 2008 selection to Denver in exchange for the rights to QB Jake Plummer. If Plummer, who had retired, had reported to the Buccaneers before the first pick of the 2008 draft was made, Tampa Bay would have sent the Broncos their fourth-round selection. Since Plummer did not report, Denver received Tampa's seventh-round selection.)
7	228	St. Louis Rams	Chris Chamberlain	LB	Tulsa	from Washington (Note: No. 228: Washington → St. Louis (D). See Round 5: No. 157: Washington → St. Louis.)
7	229	Tennessee Titans	Cary Williams	CB	Washburn	
7	230	Philadelphia Eagles	King Dunlap	T	Auburn	from Seattle (Note: No. 230: Seattle → Philadelphia (PD). Seattle traded a seventh-round selection (230th overall) to Philadelphia in exchange for FB Josh Parry.)
7	231	Cleveland Browns	Alex Hall	LB	St. Augustine's	
7	232	Atlanta Falcons	Keith Zinger	TE	LSU	from Pittsburgh (Note: No. 232: Pittsburgh → Atlanta (PD). Pittsburgh traded a seventh-round selection (232nd overall) to Atlanta in exchange for CB/RS Allen Rossum.)
7	233	Seattle Seahawks	Justin Forsett ^{†}	RB	California	from Jacksonville (Note: No. 233: Jacksonville → Seattle (PD). See Round 5: No. 158: Seattle → Jacksonville.)
7	234	San Diego Chargers	Corey Clark	T	Texas A&M	
7	235	Seattle Seahawks	Brandon Coutu	K	Georgia	from Dallas (Note: No. 235: Dallas → Seattle (D). See Round 1: No. 25: Seattle → Dallas.)
7	236	Indianapolis Colts	Jamey Richard	C	Buffalo	
7	237	New Orleans Saints	Adrian Arrington	WR	Michigan	from Green Bay (Note: No. 237: Green Bay → New Orleans (D). Green Bay traded a seventh-round selection (237th overall) to New Orleans in exchange for a 2009 sixth-round selection.)
7	238	Tampa Bay Buccaneers	Cory Boyd	RB	South Carolina	from New England (Note: No. 238: New England → Tampa Bay (D). See Round 5: No. 21: Tampa Bay → New England.)
7	239	Kansas City Chiefs	Mike Merritt	TE	UCF	from NY Giants (Note: No. 239: NY Giants → Kansas City (PD). The NY Giants traded a seventh-round selection (239th overall) to Kansas City in exchange for K Lawrence Tynes.)
7*	240	Baltimore Ravens	Allen Patrick	RB	Oklahoma	
7*	241	Carolina Panthers	Geoff Schwartz	T	Oregon	
7*	242	Washington Redskins	Rob Jackson	DE	Kansas State	
7*	243	Chicago Bears	Joey LaRocque	LB	Oregon State	
7*	244	Cincinnati Bengals	Angelo Craig	DE	Cincinnati	
7*	245	Miami Dolphins	Lionel Dotson	DE	Arizona	
7*	246	Cincinnati Bengals	Mario Urrutia	WR	Louisville	
7*	247	Chicago Bears	Kirk Barton	T	Ohio State	
7*	248	Chicago Bears	Marcus Monk	WR	Arkansas	
7*	249	Washington Redskins	Chris Horton	S	UCLA	
7*	250	Carolina Panthers	Mackenzy Bernadeau	G	Bentley	
7*	251	Buffalo Bills	Kennard Cox	CB	Pittsburgh	
7*	252	St. Louis Rams	David Vobora	LB	Idaho	Mr. Irrelevant

== Trades ==
In the explanations below, (PD) indicates trades completed prior to the start of the draft (i.e. Pre-Draft), while (D) denotes trades that took place during the 2008 draft.

Round 1

Round 2

Round 3

Round 4

Round 5

Round 6

Round 7

== Notable undrafted players ==
^{†}	= Pro Bowler

Original NFL team	Player	Pos.	College	Notes
Baltimore Ravens	Jameel McClain	LB	Syracuse	
Baltimore Ravens	Joe Reitz	T	Western Michigan	
Chicago Bears	Caleb Hanie	QB	Colorado State	
Cleveland Browns	Nate Hughes	WR	Alcorn State	
Cleveland Browns	James Lee	T	South Carolina State	
Cleveland Browns	Brian Schaefering	DE	Lindenwood	
Dallas Cowboys	Danny Amendola	WR	Texas Tech	
Denver Broncos	Brett Kern ^{†}	P	Toledo	
Denver Broncos	Tyler Polumbus	T	Colorado	
Denver Broncos	Wesley Woodyard	LB	Kentucky	
Green Bay Packers	Joey Haynos	TE	Maryland	
Green Bay Packers	J. J. Jansen ^{†}	LS	Notre Dame	
Green Bay Packers	Danny Lansanah	LB	UConn	
Green Bay Packers	Kregg Lumpkin	RB	Georgia	
Green Bay Packers	Evan Moore	TE	Stanford	
Green Bay Packers	Taj Smith	WR	Syracuse	
Green Bay Packers	Kyle Ward	CB	Louisiana–Lafayette	
Houston Texans	Jesse Nading	LB	Colorado State	
Houston Texans	Jon Weeks ^{†}	LS	Baylor	
Indianapolis Colts	Jamie Silva	S	Boston College	
Jacksonville Jaguars	Brian Witherspoon	CB	Stillman	
Kansas City Chiefs	Mike Cox	FB	Georgia Tech	
Kansas City Chiefs	Ian Cunningham	G	Virginia	
Miami Dolphins	Davone Bess	WR	Hawaii	
Miami Dolphins	Dan Carpenter ^{†}	K	Montana	
Miami Dolphins	Matthew Mulligan	TE	Maine	
Miami Dolphins	Marcel Reece ^{†}	FB	Washington	
Minnesota Vikings	Husain Abdullah	S	Washington State	
Minnesota Vikings	Leger Douzable	DE	UCF	
Minnesota Vikings	Stephen Hauschka	K	NC State	
Minnesota Vikings	Erin Henderson	OLB	Maryland	
Minnesota Vikings	Darius Reynaud	WR	West Virginia	
Minnesota Vikings	Albert Young	RB	Iowa	
New England Patriots	BenJarvus Green-Ellis	RB	Ole Miss	
New England Patriots	Gary Guyton	LB	Georgia Tech	
New England Patriots	Jonathan Stupar	TE	Virginia	
New England Patriots	Ryan Wendell	C	Fresno State	
New Orleans Saints	Jo-Lonn Dunbar	LB	Boston College	
New Orleans Saints	Garrett Hartley	K	Oklahoma	
New Orleans Saints	David Roach	S	TCU	
New York Giants	Wallace Gilberry	DE	Alabama	
New York Jets	Ropati Pitoitua	DE	Washington State	
New York Jets	Danny Woodhead	RB	Chadron State	
Philadelphia Eagles	Kyle Arrington	CB	Hofstra	
Philadelphia Eagles	Jed Collins	FB	Washington State	
Pittsburgh Steelers	Patrick Bailey	LB	Duke	
Pittsburgh Steelers	Doug Legursky	C	Marshall	
St. Louis Rams	Lance Ball	RB	Maryland	
St. Louis Rams	Andrew Hawkins	WR	Toledo	
San Diego Chargers	Brandyn Dombrowski	T	San Diego State	
San Diego Chargers	Mike Tolbert ^{†}	FB	Coastal Carolina	
San Francisco 49ers	Brian de la Puente	C	California	
Seattle Seahawks	David Hawthorne	LB	TCU	
Tampa Bay Buccaneers	Chris Clark	T	Southern Miss	
Tampa Bay Buccaneers	Elbert Mack	CB	Troy	
Tampa Bay Buccaneers	Clifton Smith ^{†}	RB	Fresno State	
Tennessee Titans	Jerrell Freeman	LB	Mary Hardin–Baylor	
Tennessee Titans	Fernando Velasco	C	Georgia	
Washington Redskins	Kyle DeVan	G	Oregon State	

== Draft breakdown ==
=== By conference ===
Selection totals by college conference:

#	Conference	Players selected	Division
1	Southeastern Conference	35	I FBS
2	Pac-10 Conference	34	I FBS
3	Atlantic Coast Conference	33	I FBS
4	Big 12 Conference	29	I FBS
5	Big Ten Conference	28	I FBS
6	Big East Conference	19	I FBS
7	Conference USA	11	I FBS
8	Mid-American Conference	9	I FBS
9	Western Athletic Conference	8	I FBS
10	Mountain West Conference	7	I FBS
11	Independent	5	I FBS
12	Colonial Athletic Association	4	I FCS
13	Big Sky Conference	3	I FCS
13	Southern Conference	3	I FCS
13	Southland Conference	3	I FCS
13	Sun Belt Conference	3	I FBS
17	Big South Conference	2	I FCS
17	Gateway Football Conference	2	I FCS
17	Mid-Eastern Athletic Conference	2	I FCS
17	Mid-America Intercollegiate Athletics Association	2	II
17	Ohio Valley Conference	2	I FCS
22	Central Intercollegiate Athletic Association	1	II
22	College Conference of Illinois and Wisconsin	1	III
22	Great Lakes Intercollegiate Athletic Conference	1	II
22	Great West Conference	1	I FCS
22	Northeast-10 Conference	1	II
22	Ohio Athletic Conference	1	III
22	Pioneer Football League	1	I FCS
22	Southwestern Athletic Conference	1	I FCS

=== By position ===
Round	QB	RB	FB	WR	TE	C	G	OT	DE	DT	LB	CB	S	K	P	LS
1st	2	5	0	0	1	0	0	8*	4	3	2	5	1	0	0	0
2nd	2	2	0	10*	3	1	1	0	3	2	2	5	1	0	0	0
3rd	1	3	1	5	3	1	0	3	4	3	5	4	3	0	0	0
4th	0	1	0	5	3	2	2	4	3	2	4	8*	2	0	0	0
5th	4	3	2	2	2	0	1	2	2	5*	4	4	0	0	0	0
6th	2	5	0	6*	2	2	1	2	5	2	5	1	5	1	1	1
7th	2	4	1	7*	2	1	2	7*	5	1	6	3	3	1	0	0
TOTAL	13	23	4	35*	16	7	7	26	26	18	28	30	15	2	1	1
