= 2007 Delaware Fightin' Blue Hens football team =

American college football season

2007 Delaware Fightin' Blue Hens football

Lambert Cup winner

NCAA Division I Championship Game, L 21–49 vs. Appalachian State
- Conference: Colonial Athletic Association
- South Division

Ranking
- Sports Network: No. 2
- FCS Coaches: No. 2
- Record: 11–4 (5–3 CAA)
- Head coach: K. C. Keeler (6th season)
- Offensive coordinator: Kirk Ciarrocca (6th season)
- Offensive scheme: Spread
- Defensive coordinator: Nick Rapone (2nd season)
- Base defense: 4–3
- Home stadium: Delaware Stadium

2007 Colonial Athletic Association football standings
	Conf.			Overall
Team	W		L	W		L
North Division
No. 7 UMass x+^	7	–	1	10	–	3
Hofstra	4	–	4	7	–	4
No. 14 New Hampshire ^	4	–	4	7	–	5
Maine	3	–	5	4	–	7
Northeastern	2	–	6	3	–	8
Rhode Island	2	–	6	3	–	8
South Division
No. 5 Richmond x+^	7	–	1	11	–	3
No. 12 James Madison ^	6	–	2	8	–	4
No. 2 Delaware ^	5	–	3	11	–	4
Villanova	5	–	3	7	–	4
William & Mary	2	–	6	4	–	7
Towson	1	–	7	3	–	8
+ – Conference co-champions; x – Division champion/co-champions; ^ – FCS playoff participant; Rankings from The Sports Network poll

The 2007 Delaware Fightin' Blue Hens football team represented the University of Delaware as a member of the South Division of the Colonial Athletic Association (CAA) during the 2007 NCAA Division I FCS football season. Led by sixth-year head coach K. C. Keeler, the Fightin' Blue Hens compiled an overall record of 11–4 with a mark of 5–3 in conference play, tying for third place in the CAA's South Division. Delaware advanced to the NCAA Division I Football Championship playoffs, where the Fightin' Blue Hens beat Delaware State in the first round, Northern Iowa in the quarterfinals, and Southern Illinois in the semifinals before losing to Appalachian State in the NCAA Division I Championship Game. The team played home games at Delaware Stadium in Newark, Delaware.

== Preseason ==
=== Conference changes ===
The 2007 season marked the first season of play for the Colonial Athletic Association, which was formed in 2005. From 1997 to 2006, the Delaware Blue Hens football team was a member of the Atlantic 10 Conference. Delaware, along with Hofstra University, James Madison University, the University of Maine, the University of Massachusetts, the University of New Hampshire, Northeastern University, the University of Rhode Island, the University of Richmond, Towson University, Villanova University, and the College of William & Mary, left the Atlantic 10 Conference to form the twelve-team conference.

=== Recruiting class ===
The Blue Hens received 17 letters of intent on National Signing Day, February 7, 2007.

College recruiting
Name	Hometown	School	Height	Weight	40^{‡}	Commit date
Shea Allard; OL	Wareham, Massachusetts	Wareham HS	6 ft 5 in (1.96 m)	265 lb (120 kg)	5.2	Nov 12, 2006
Shea Allard; OL	Recruit ratings: No ratings found					
Chuck Anderson; LB	Parsippany, New Jersey	Parsippany HS	6 ft 2 in (1.88 m)	225 lb (102 kg)	–	Feb 7, 2007
Chuck Anderson; LB	Recruit ratings: No ratings found					
Michael Atunrase; DL	Yardley, Pennsylvania	Lawrenceville School	6 ft 2 in (1.88 m)	235 lb (107 kg)	4.9	Jan 9, 2007
Michael Atunrase; DL	Recruit ratings: No ratings found					
Scott Bradish; QB	Newton, Pennsylvania	Council Rock North HS	6 ft 4 in (1.93 m)	192 lb (87 kg)	–	
Scott Bradish; QB	Recruit ratings: No ratings found					
Sam Burrows; OL	Wilmington, Delaware	Concord HS	6 ft 3 in (1.91 m)	315 lb (143 kg)	–	Grayshirt (college sports)
Sam Burrows; OL	Recruit ratings: No ratings found					
Jerry Butler; RB	Philadelphia, Pennsylvania	George Washington HS	5 ft 9 in (1.75 m)	183 lb (83 kg)	–	
Jerry Butler; RB	Recruit ratings: No ratings found					
Cody Cipalla; DB	Albion, Pennsylvania	Northwestern HS	5 ft 11 in (1.80 m)	175 lb (79 kg)	4.5	Dec 4, 2006
Cody Cipalla; DB	Recruit ratings: Rivals: (72)					
Tyrone Grant; DB	Brooklyn, New York	Poly Prep Country Day School	5 ft 9 in (1.75 m)	170 lb (77 kg)	4.6	Feb 7, 2007
Tyrone Grant; DB	Recruit ratings: No ratings found					
Siddiq Haynes; DL	Durham, North Carolina	Jordan HS	6 ft 1 in (1.85 m)	287 lb (130 kg)	–	Grayshirt (college sports)
Siddiq Haynes; DL	Recruit ratings: No ratings found					
Demitrius Hester; DL	Gibbstown, New Jersey	Paulsboro HS	6 ft 0 in (1.83 m)	285 lb (129 kg)	–	
Demitrius Hester; DL	Recruit ratings: No ratings found					
Eddie Lugo; LB	Brooklyn, New York	Poly Prep Country Day School	6 ft 4 in (1.93 m)	213 lb (97 kg)	–	
Eddie Lugo; LB	Recruit ratings: No ratings found					
Marvin McKinnie; DB	Woodbury, New Jersey	Woodbury HS (Dean JC)	5 ft 9 in (1.75 m)	152 lb (69 kg)	4.3	Feb 7, 2007
Marvin McKinnie; DB	Recruit ratings: No ratings found					
Chris Morales; DL	Methuen, Massachusetts	Central Catholic HS	6 ft 1 in (1.85 m)	240 lb (110 kg)	4.8	Feb 7, 2007
Chris Morales; DL	Recruit ratings: No ratings found					
Will Nagle; OL	Green Harbor, Massachusetts	Marshfield HS	6 ft 4 in (1.93 m)	265 lb (120 kg)	–	
Will Nagle; OL	Recruit ratings: No ratings found					
Colin Nagle; TE	Reading, Pennsylvania	Reading Central Catholic HS	6 ft 4 in (1.93 m)	230 lb (100 kg)	–	
Colin Nagle; TE	Recruit ratings: No ratings found					
Jay Pena; DB	Lawrence, Massachusetts	Whittier Tech	5 ft 11 in (1.80 m)	190 lb (86 kg)	–	
Jay Pena; DB	Recruit ratings: No ratings found					
Michael Perry; K	Thorofare, New Jersey	West Deptford HS	5 ft 8 in (1.73 m)	180 lb (82 kg)	–	
Michael Perry; K	Recruit ratings: No ratings found					
Zack Reed; TE	Huntingdon, Pennsylvania	Huntingdon Area HS	6 ft 3 in (1.91 m)	225 lb (102 kg)	5.0	Feb 7, 2007
Zack Reed; TE	Recruit ratings: No ratings found					
Lou Ritacco; QB	Nutley, New Jersey	Nutley HS	6 ft 2 in (1.88 m)	215 lb (98 kg)	4.8	
Lou Ritacco; QB	Recruit ratings: No ratings found					
Phillip Thaxton; RB	Yorktown, Virginia	Grafton HS	5 ft 10 in (1.78 m)	175 lb (79 kg)	4.4	Dec 26, 2006
Phillip Thaxton; RB	Recruit ratings: Rivals: (70)					
Overall recruit ranking:
‡ Refers to 40-yard dash; Note: In many cases, Scout, Rivals, 247Sports, On3, and ESPN may conflict in their listings of height, weight and 40 time.; In these cases, the average was taken. ESPN grades are on a 100-point scale.; Sources: "Delaware Commit List for 2007". Rivals.; "RecruitTracker 2007: Delaware". ESPN.; "2007 Team Ranking". Rivals.com.

=== Transfers ===
The Blue Hens received three transfer students prior to the start of the 2007 season in defensive end Ronald Talley from Notre Dame, linebacker Johnathon Smith from Connecticut, and running back Jerry Butler from Wisconsin. Talley left Notre Dame midway through the 2006 season before transferring to Delaware. On August 27, offensive tackle Anthony Grosso transferred from Florida State after leaving the squad a week prior.

=== Preseason awards ===
Projected starting running back Omar Cuff earned Preseason first-team All-CAA honors, Lindy's College Football Preview Magazine Preseason All-America honors, and The Sports Network Preseason third-team All-America honors.

== Schedule ==
Date	Time	Opponent	Rank	Site	TV	Result	Attendance	Source
August 30	7:30 pm	at William & Mary	No. 19	Zable Stadium; Williamsburg, VA (rivalry)	CN8	W 49–31	11,639	
September 8	7:00 pm	No. 15 (D-II) West Chester*	No. 13	Delaware Stadium; Newark, DE (rivalry)		W 41–14	22,495	
September 15	3:30 pm	Rhode Island	No. 10	Delaware Stadium; Newark, DE	CN8	W 38–9	22,064	
September 22	7:00 pm	at Towson	No. 11	Johnny Unitas Stadium; Towson, MD	CSN	W 27–7	10,856	
September 29	7:00 pm	Monmouth*	No. 12	Delaware Stadium; Newark, DE		W 42–7	21,431	
October 6	12:00 pm	at No. 15 New Hampshire	No. 11	Cowell Stadium; Durham, NH	CN8	L 30–35	7,115	
October 13	12:00 pm	Northeastern^{†}	No. 15	Delaware Stadium; Newark, DE		W 30–20	21,570	
October 27	1:00 pm	at Navy*	No. 9	Navy–Marine Corps Memorial Stadium; Annapolis, MD	CSTV	W 59–52	35,213	
November 3	12:00 pm	No. 12 James Madison	No. 7	Delaware Stadium; Newark, DE (rivalry)	CSN	W 37–34	22,061	
November 10	1:00 pm	No. 9 Richmond	No. 6	Delaware Stadium; Newark, DE		L 56–62 ^{5OT}	21,187	
November 17	3:30 pm	at Villanova	No. 9	Villanova Stadium; Villanova, PA (Battle of the Blue)	CN8	L 10–16	10,817	
November 23	1:30 pm	No. 10 Delaware State*	No. 13	Delaware Stadium; Newark, DE (NCAA Division I First Round, rivalry)	ESPN	W 44–7	19,765	
December 1	2:00 pm	at No. 1 Northern Iowa*	No. 13	UNI-Dome; Cedar Falls, IA (NCAA Division I Quarterfinal)	ESPNGP	W 39–27	15,803	
December 8	4:00 pm	at No. 4 Southern Illinois*	No. 13	McAndrew Stadium; Carbondale, IL (NCAA Division I Semifinal)	ESPN	W 20–17	11,503	
December 14	8:00 pm	vs. No. 5 Appalachian State*	No. 13	Finley Stadium; Chattanooga, TN (NCAA Division I Championship Game)	ESPN	L 21–49	23,010	
*Non-conference game; ^{†}Homecoming; Rankings from The Sports Network Poll released prior to the game; All times are in Eastern time

== Game summaries ==
=== William & Mary ===
	1	2	3	4	Total
#19 Delaware	0	21	7	21	49
William & Mary	3	0	7	21	31

In the first CAA Conference game of the newly formed conference's history, Delaware senior running back Omar Cuff tied an NCAA record with seven touchdowns in the game. Cuff tied with Archie Amerson of Northern Arizona, who set the record in 1996, and Jessie Burton of McNeese State, who tied the record in 1998. Cuff rushed for 244 yards and six touchdowns on 30 attempts, with four receptions for 52 yards and a touchdown. Senior quarterback Joe Flacco passed for 202 yards and one touchdown in the 49–31 victory over William & Mary.

With the win, the Blue Hens became 1–0 on the season.

=== West Chester ===
	1	2	3	4	Total
#15 (D-II) West Chester	0	0	7	7	14
#13 Delaware	21	13	7	0	41

In the first quarter of Delaware's home-opener against the West Chester Golden Rams, quarterback Joe Flacco led the Blue Hens on a 62-yard drive that ended in a seven-yard touchdown run by Omar Cuff. On the Golden Rams' next drive, a tipped pass resulted in a Delaware interception. The Blue Hens took advantage of this opportunity, ending the drive with a one-yard touchdown run by Cuff. The Blue Hens led the West Chester Golden Rams 34–0 heading into halftime.

Cuff scored rushing four touchdowns in the first half, with 21 rushes for 93 yards in the 41–14 win. Freshman running back Phillip Thaxton, who replaced Cuff in the second half, rushed for 177 yards on 12 attempts. On his first collegiate carry, he scored a 62-yard touchdown. His 177 yards was the most by a Blue Hen in his debut in college. Flacco finished with 305 yards, with wide receiver Mark Duncan catching five passes for 121 yards. Delaware finished with 599 yards of total offense in their fourteenth-straight win over West Chester.

With the win, the Blue Hens extended their record to 2–0.

=== Rhode Island ===
	1	2	3	4	Total
Rhode Island	2	0	0	7	9
#10 Delaware	7	14	14	3	38

Joe Flacco passed for 337 yards and three touchdowns on 25 completions. Junior wide receiver Aaron Love, playing through groin and shoulder injuries, caught 10 passes for 137 yards and one touchdown. Mark Duncan caught six receptions for 109 yards. Freshman cornerback Anthony Walters made five tackles and recovered a fumble in the endzone for a touchdown.

=== Towson ===
	1	2	3	4	Total
#11 Delaware	7	10	7	3	27
Towson	0	0	7	0	7

The Delaware defense held Towson's offense to 157 total yards, with seven sacks on the quarterback. Sophomore defensive end Matt Marcorelle made six tackles with three sacks for 27 yards. Omar Cuff rushed for 109 yards and three touchdowns on 27 carries. Joe Flacco passed for 274 yards and one interception. Aaron Love made seven receptions for 107 yards.

=== Monmouth ===
	1	2	3	4	Total
Monmouth	7	0	0	0	7
#12 Delaware	21	21	0	0	42

Omar Cuff rushed for 73 yards and two touchdowns on 16 carries, and caught a touchdown pass. He became the school's all-time scoring leader with 314 points, breaking the previous record of 308. Joe Flacco passed for 215 yards and two touchdowns. Cornerback Fred Andrew returned an interception for a touchdown of 78 yards. Phillip Thaxton rushed for a 14-yard touchdown, and tight end Robbie Agnone caught an 11-yard touchdown pass. Freshman safety Cody Cipalla made seven tackles (four solo).

=== New Hampshire ===
	1	2	3	4	Total
#11 Delaware	0	3	7	20	30
#15 New Hampshire	0	21	14	0	35

Joe Flacco passed for 419 yards and two touchdowns with 40 completions and 51 pass attempts. Omar Cuff rushed for 88 yards on 22 carries and made seven receptions for 68 yards and a touchdown. He broke the school record for rushing touchdowns in a career with 49. The previous record was 47 by Daryl Brown in 1991–1994. Defensive end Ronald Talley blocked a field goal attempt by New Hampshire kicker Tom Manning.

=== Northeastern ===
	1	2	3	4	Total
Northeastern	7	7	6	0	20
#15 Delaware	10	3	7	10	30

Omar Cuff rushed for 200 yards and two touchdowns on 39 carries and caught a touchdown pass. Kicker Jon Striefsky kicked three field goals of 37, 31 and 19 yards. Joe Flacco passed for 222 yards and one touchdown on 17 completions. Robbie Agnone and wide receiver Kervin Michaud both caught five passes.

=== Navy ===
	1	2	3	4	Total
#9 Delaware	7	21	14	17	59
(FBS) Navy	14	14	7	17	52

Omar Cuff rushed for 141 yards and four touchdowns on 28 carries. Joe Flacco passed for a career-high 434 yards and four touchdowns on 30 completions. Kervin Michaud made eight receptions for 96 yards and two touchdowns. Robbie Agnone caught seven passes for 133 yards. Junior linebacker Erik Johnson made 20 tackles, and Anthony Bratton made 12 tackles and recovered a fumble.

=== James Madison ===
	1	2	3	4	Total
#12 James Madison	0	6	21	7	34
#7 Delaware	10	6	14	7	37

Omar Cuff rushed for 101 yards and three touchdowns on 28 attempts and made seven receptions for 66 yards. Joe Flacco went 33-for-41 and passed for 257 yards. He also rushed for one touchdown. Aaron Love made nine receptions for 94 yards. Anthony Walters recovered a fumble and intercepted a James Madison pass. Jon Striefsky made three field goals in the first half of the game.

=== Richmond ===
	1	2	3	4	OT	2OT	3OT	4OT	5OT	Total
#9 Richmond	7	17	7	7	7	3	0	8	6	62
#6 Delaware	7	14	10	7	7	3	0	8	0	56

Joe Flacco passed for 375 yards and three touchdowns and rushed for two touchdowns. Mark Duncan made nine receptions for 157 yards and two touchdowns. Omar Cuff rushed for 189 yards and two touchdowns on a school-record 48 attempts.

=== Villanova ===
	1	2	3	4	Total
#9 Delaware	3	7	0	0	10
Villanova	0	3	0	13	16

Joe Flacco went 17-of-31 and passed for 145 yards. Omar Cuff, playing through a back injury, rushed for 75 yards on 17 attempts. Aaron Love made seven receptions for 79 yards, and Anthony Walters made seven tackles.

=== Delaware State ===
	1	2	3	4	Total
#10 Delaware State	0	0	0	7	7
#13 Delaware	20	10	14	0	44

Omar Cuff rushed for a school-record 288 yards and four touchdowns on 38 carries. The previous record for rushing yards in a game was 272 by Daryl Brown in 1994. Cuff also broke the single-season rushing record with 1,657 yards. The previous record was 1,625 by Germaine Bennett in 2003. Joe Flacco passed for 189 yards and one touchdown on 11 completions.

=== Northern Iowa ===
	1	2	3	4	Total
#13 Delaware	0	19	10	10	39
#1 Northern Iowa	10	3	7	7	27

Erik Johnson recovered a fumble and returned it 55 yards for a touchdown in the second quarter. Joe Flacco passed for 312 yards and two touchdowns and scored a one-yard rushing touchdown in the fourth quarter. He broke the school record for passing yards in a season with 3,686. The previous record was 3,436 by Matt Nagy in 2000. Omar Cuff rushed for 102 yards and one touchdown on 28 carries. Mark Duncan caught eight receptions for 112 yards and one touchdown. Jon Striefsky missed two extra point attempts in the first half, but made two field goals distancing 47 and 42 yards.

=== Southern Illinois ===
	1	2	3	4	Total
#13 Delaware	0	7	7	6	20
#4 Southern Illinois	10	0	0	7	17

Joe Flacco went 21-of-38 and passed for 243 yards and two touchdowns. Jon Striefsky kicked two field goals, breaking the school's and conference's single-season records for field goals with 21. Omar Cuff rushed for 102 yards and caught four passes for 67 yards.

=== Appalachian State ===
	1	2	3	4	Total
#13 Delaware	0	7	7	7	21
#5 Appalachian State	14	14	7	14	49

Joe Flacco passed for 336 yards and one touchdown. Omar Cuff rushed for 83 yards and one touchdown. The record attendance of 23,010 on hand at Finley Stadium was the largest neutral site crowd for the NCAA Division I Championship Game.

== Awards and honors ==
=== Players ===
- Robbie Agnone
  The Sports Network NCAA Division I Football Championship Subdivision honorable mention All-American
- Greg Benson
  CAA Academic All-Conference
- Rich Beverley
  Third-team All-CAA
- Brian Brown
  CAA Academic All-Conference
- Mike Byrne
  First-team All-CAA
  Walter Camp first-team All-American
  ESPN The Magazine CoSIDA Academic All-District 2
  Associated Press FCS third-team All-American
  The Sports Network NCAA Division I Football Championship Subdivision second-team All-American
  First-team All-ECAC Division I Football Championship Subdivision
  College Sporting News Fabulous 50 NCAA Division I Football Championship Subdivision All-American
  Football Championship Subdivision Athletics Directors Association National Academic All-Star
  Colonial Athletic Association Student-Athlete of the Year Award
  CAA Academic All-Conference
- Brad Casalvieri
  CAA Academic All-Conference
- Cody Cipalla
  CAA Rookie of the Week (Oct. 2)
- Omar Cuff
  CAA Offensive Player of the Week (Sept. 5)
  The Sports Network National Offensive Player of the Week (Sept. 5)
  College Sporting News National Offensive Player of the Week (Sept. 5)
  First-team All-CAA
  Walter Camp first-team All-American
  American Football Coaches Association first-team All-American
  Associated Press FCS first-team All-American
  The Sports Network NCAA Division I Football Championship Subdivision first-team All-American
  First-team All-ECAC Division I Football Championship Subdivision
  College Sporting News Fabulous 50 NCAA Division I Football Championship Subdivision All-American
  The Sports Media and Entertainment Network Running Back of the Year
- Joe Flacco
  CAA Offensive Player of the Week (Oct. 29)
  Colonial Athletic Association Co-Offensive Player of the Year
  First-team All-CAA
  The Sports Network NCAA Division I Football Championship Subdivision third-team All-American
  Eastern College Athletic Conference Player of the Year
  First-team All-ECAC Division I Football Championship Subdivision
  Pro Football Weekly honorable mention All-American
  CAA Academic All-Conference
- Kheon Hendricks
  First-team All-CAA
  The Sports Network NCAA Division I Football Championship Subdivision honorable mention All-American
- Jon Herrman
  CAA Academic All-Conference
- Rick Jarnagin
  CAA Academic All-Conference
- Erik Johnson
  CAA Academic All-Conference
- J. T. Laws
  2007 Blue Hen Team Sportsmanship Award
  CAA Academic All-Conference
- Aaron Love
  Sports Media Entertainment Network Weekly Star (Sept. 18)
  First-team All-CAA
  The Sports Network NCAA Division I Football Championship Subdivision honorable mention All-American
- Mark Mackey
  CAA Academic All-Conference
- Matt Marcorelle
  CAA Defensive Player of the Week (Sept. 25)
  Third-team All-CAA
  The Sports Network NCAA Division I Football Championship Subdivision honorable mention All-American
  College Sporting News Fabulous 50 NCAA Division I Football Championship Subdivision All-American
- Kervin Michaud
  Third-team All-CAA
- Jon Striefsky
  CAA Special Teams Player of the Week (Nov. 7)
  First-team All-CAA
  Associated Press FCS first-team All-American
  The Sports Network NCAA Division I Football Championship Subdivision first-team All-American
- Phillip Thaxton
  CAA Rookie of the Week (Sept. 13)
- Anthony Walters
  CAA Rookie of the Week (Sept. 18)

=== Coaches ===
- K. C. Keeler
  Maxwell Club Tri-State Coach of the Year Award
  Johnny Vaught Head Coach Award

=== Other awards ===
- 2007 Lambert Cup
- Eastern College Athletic Conference Team of the Year

== Postseason ==
Quarterback Joe Flacco was invited to participate in the 2008 NFL Scouting Combine that took place February 21–24, 2008. Flacco was selected to play in the 83rd East–West Shrine Game that took place on January 19, 2008, at the University of Houston's Robertson Stadium, but declined after he was invited to play in the 2008 Senior Bowl that took place on January 26, 2008, at Ladd–Peebles Stadium in Mobile, Alabama.

Flacco was selected by the Baltimore Ravens in the first round (18th overall) of the 2008 NFL draft. Flacco was the only Blue Hen selected in the draft, but three other players signed with NFL teams as undrafted free agents. Offensive guard Rich Beverley was signed by the Washington Redskins, offensive tackle Mike Byrne was signed by the Miami Dolphins, and running back Omar Cuff was signed by the Tennessee Titans.
