= 2007 Rhode Island Rams football team =

American college football season

2007 Rhode Island Rams football
- Conference: Colonial Athletic Association
- North Division
- Record: 3–8 (2–6 CAA)
- Head coach: Tim Stowers (8th season)
- Offensive coordinator: Harold Nichols (8th season)
- Defensive coordinator: Dick Hopkins (2nd season)
- Home stadium: Meade Stadium

2007 Colonial Athletic Association football standings
| | Conf. | | | Overall |
| Team | W | | L | W | | L |
|---|---|---|---|---|---|---|
North Division
| No. 7 UMass x+^ | 7 | – | 1 | 10 | – | 3 |
| Hofstra | 4 | – | 4 | 7 | – | 4 |
| No. 14 New Hampshire ^ | 4 | – | 4 | 7 | – | 5 |
| Maine | 3 | – | 5 | 4 | – | 7 |
| Northeastern | 2 | – | 6 | 3 | – | 8 |
| Rhode Island | 2 | – | 6 | 3 | – | 8 |
South Division
| No. 5 Richmond x+^ | 7 | – | 1 | 11 | – | 3 |
| No. 12 James Madison ^ | 6 | – | 2 | 8 | – | 4 |
| No. 2 Delaware ^ | 5 | – | 3 | 11 | – | 4 |
| Villanova | 5 | – | 3 | 7 | – | 4 |
| William & Mary | 2 | – | 6 | 4 | – | 7 |
| Towson | 1 | – | 7 | 3 | – | 8 |
+ – Conference co-champions; x – Division champion/co-champions; ^ – FCS playoff participant; Rankings from The Sports Network poll

The 2007 Rhode Island Rams football team was an American football team that represented the University of Rhode Island in the Colonial Athletic Association (CAA) during the 2007 NCAA Division I FCS football season. In their seventh and final season under head coach Tim Stowers, the Rams compiled a 3–8 record (2–6 against conference opponents) and tied for last place in the North Division of the CAA's North Division.

== Schedule ==
| Date | Time | Opponent | Site | TV | Result | Attendance | Source |
|---|---|---|---|---|---|---|---|
| September 1 | | Fordham | Meade Stadium; Kingston, RI | | L 23–27 | 2,092 | |
| September 8 | 1:00 p.m. | at Army | Michie Stadium; West Point, NY | ESPN Classic | L 7–14 ^{OT} | 27,601 | |
| September 15 | 3:30 p.m. | at No. 10 Delaware | Delaware Stadium; Newark, DE | CN8 | L 9–38 | 22,064 | |
| September 22 | | No. 15 Hofstra | Meade Stadium; Kingston, RI | | L 24–37 | | |
| September 29 | | at Brown | Brown Stadium; Providence, RI (rivalry) | | W 49–42 ^{2OT} | 6,153 | |
| October 13 | 1:00 p.m. | No. 9 James Madison | Meade Stadium; Kingston, RI | | L 27–44 | 6,163 | |
| October 20 | 3:30 p.m. | at Richmond | University of Richmond Stadium; Richmond, VA | | L 6–38 | 8,955 | |
| October 27 | 12:00 p.m. | at No. 4 New Hampshire | Cowell Stadium; Durham, NH | NESN | L 36–49 | 6,015 | |
| November 3 | 12:00 p.m. | No. 3 UMass | Meade Stadium; Kingston, RI | | W 12–6 ^{OT} | 4,118 | |
| November 10 | | at Maine | Alfond Stadium; Orono, ME | | L 0–35 | | |
| November 17 | | Northeastern | Meade Stadium; Kingston, RI | | W 35–30 | | |
Rankings from The Sports Network Poll released prior to the game; All times are in Eastern time

== Coaching staff ==
Rhode Island Rams
| Name | Position | Consecutive season at Rhode Island in current position | Previous position |
| Tim Stowers | Head coach | 8th | Temple offensive coordinator (1999) |
| Harold Nichols | Associate head coach and offensive coordinator | 2nd | Rhode Island offensive coordinator and quarterbacks coach (2000–2005) |
| Dick Hopkins | Defensive coordinator | 2nd | The Citadel defensive coordinator (2004–2005) |
| Tony Brinson | Defensive backs coach | 1st | Rhode Island defensive line coach (2004–2006) |
| RaShan Frost | Defensive line coach | 3rd | Illinois State defensive line coach (2002–2004) |
| John Gendron | Offensive line coach | 2nd | Bridgewater State linebackers coach (2004–2005) |
| Jeff Weaver | Special teams coordinator and a-backs coach | 2nd | Rhode Island wide receivers coach and a-backs coach (2005) |
| Chuck Watson | Wide receivers coach | 2nd | Cranston East HS (RI) assistant coach (1993–1995) |
| Joe Todd | Linebackers coach | 1st | New Hampshire linebackers coach (2006) |
