= 2007 William & Mary Tribe football team =

American college football season

2007 William & Mary Tribe football
- Conference: Colonial Athletic Association
- South Division
- Record: 4–7 (2–6 CAA)
- Head coach: Jimmye Laycock (28th season)
- Offensive coordinator: Zbig Kepa (15th season)
- Defensive coordinator: Bob Shoop (1st season)
- Captains: Derek Cox; Brad Stewart
- Home stadium: Zable Stadium

2007 Colonial Athletic Association football standings
	Conf.			Overall
Team	W		L	W		L
North Division
No. 7 UMass x+^	7	–	1	10	–	3
Hofstra	4	–	4	7	–	4
No. 14 New Hampshire ^	4	–	4	7	–	5
Maine	3	–	5	4	–	7
Northeastern	2	–	6	3	–	8
Rhode Island	2	–	6	3	–	8
South Division
No. 5 Richmond x+^	7	–	1	11	–	3
No. 12 James Madison ^	6	–	2	8	–	4
No. 2 Delaware ^	5	–	3	11	–	4
Villanova	5	–	3	7	–	4
William & Mary	2	–	6	4	–	7
Towson	1	–	7	3	–	8
+ – Conference co-champions; x – Division champion/co-champions; ^ – FCS playoff participant; Rankings from The Sports Network poll

The 2007 William & Mary Tribe football team represented the College of William & Mary as member of South Division of the Colonial Athletic Association (CAA) during the 2007 NCAA Division I FCS football season. Led by Jimmye Laycock in his 28th year as head coach, William & Mary finished the season with an overall record of 4–7 and a mark of 2–6 in A-10 play, placing fifth in the South Division.

== Schedule ==
Date	Time	Opponent	Site	TV	Result	Attendance	Source
August 30	7:30 pm	No. 19 Delaware	Zable Stadium; Williamsburg, VA (rivalry)	COX	L 31–49	11,639	
September 8	1:00 pm	at VMI*	Alumni Memorial Field; Lexington, VA (rivalry)		W 63–16	6,830	
September 15	7:00 pm	Liberty*	Zable Stadium; Williamsburg, VA		W 48–41 ^{OT}	9,329	
September 22	1:30 pm	at No. 17 (FBS) Virginia Tech*	Lane Stadium; Blacksburg, VA	ACCS	L 3–44	66,233	
September 29	1:00 pm	Towson	Zable Stadium; Williamsburg, VA		W 27–22	10,094	
October 6	6:00 pm	at Villanova	Villanova Stadium; Villanova, PA		L 24–63	8,721	
October 13	3:00 pm	at Maine	Alfond Stadium; Orono, ME		W 31–20	7,122	
October 27	1:00 pm	No. 4 UMass^{†}	Zable Stadium; Williamsburg, VA		L 34–48	10,178	
November 3	1:00 pm	at No. 20 Hofstra	James M. Shuart Stadium; Hempstead, NY		L 14–38	3,151	
November 10	7:00 pm	No. 16 James Madison	Zable Stadium; Williamsburg, VA (rivalry)		L 34–55	12,259	
November 16	12:00 pm	at No. 7 Richmond	University of Richmond Stadium; Richmond, VA (I-64 Bowl)	CSN	L 20–31	7,652	
*Non-conference game; ^{†}Homecoming; Rankings from The Sports Network Poll released prior to the game; All times are in Eastern time
