= 2007 James Madison Dukes football team =

American college football season

2007 James Madison Dukes football

NCAA Division I First Round, L 27–28 at Appalachian State
- Conference: Colonial Athletic Association
- South Division
- Record: 8–4 (6–2 CAA)
- Head coach: Mickey Matthews (9th season)
- Offensive coordinator: Jeff Durden (4th season)
- Defensive coordinator: George Barlow (4th season)
- Home stadium: Bridgeforth Stadium

2007 Colonial Athletic Association football standings
	Conf.			Overall
Team	W		L	W		L
North Division
No. 7 UMass x+^	7	–	1	10	–	3
Hofstra	4	–	4	7	–	4
No. 14 New Hampshire ^	4	–	4	7	–	5
Maine	3	–	5	4	–	7
Northeastern	2	–	6	3	–	8
Rhode Island	2	–	6	3	–	8
South Division
No. 5 Richmond x+^	7	–	1	11	–	3
No. 12 James Madison ^	6	–	2	8	–	4
No. 2 Delaware ^	5	–	3	11	–	4
Villanova	5	–	3	7	–	4
William & Mary	2	–	6	4	–	7
Towson	1	–	7	3	–	8
+ – Conference co-champions; x – Division champion/co-champions; ^ – FCS playoff participant; Rankings from The Sports Network poll

The 2007 James Madison Dukes football team represented James Madison University in the 2007 NCAA Division I FCS football season. They were led by head coach Mickey Matthews and played their home games at Bridgeforth Stadium in Harrisonburg, Virginia. JMU finished the season 8–4 with a record of 6–2 in their first season as members of the Colonial Athletic Association.

== Schedule ==
Date	Time	Opponent	Rank	Site	TV	Result	Attendance	Source
September 1	6:00 pm	at North Carolina*	No. 8	Kenan Memorial Stadium; Chapel Hill, NC	ESPN360	L 14–37	58,500	
September 8	3:30 pm	No. 5 New Hampshire*	No. 11	Bridgeforth Stadium; Harrisonburg, VA	CN8	W 41–24	14,021	
September 15	6:00 pm	VMI*	No. 9	Bridgeforth Stadium; Harrisonburg, VA		W 45–17	15,083	
September 22	6:00 pm	Coastal Carolina	No. 8	Bridgeforth Stadium; Harrisonburg, VA		W 45–10	15,260	
September 29	12:00 pm	Villanova	No. 9	Bridgeforth Stadium; Harrisonburg, VA	CSN	W 35–7	15,035	
October 6	12:30 pm	at Northeastern	No. 9	Parsons Field; Brookline, MA		W 21–14	2,083	
October 13	1:00 pm	at Rhode Island	No. 9	Meade Stadium; Kingston, RI		W 44–27	6,163	
October 26	12:00 pm	No. 14 Richmond^{†}	No. 6	Bridgeforth Stadium; Harrisonburg, VA		L 16–17	14,009	
November 3	12:00 pm	at No. 7 Delaware	No. 12	Delaware Stadium; Newark, DE (rivalry)	CSN	L 34–37	22,061	
November 10	7:00 pm	at William & Mary	No. 16	Zable Stadium; Williamsburg, VA (rivalry)		W 55–34	12,259	
November 17	1:30 pm	Towson	No. 14	Bridgeforth Stadium; Harrisonburg, VA		W 23–13	13,661	
November 24	12:00 pm	at No. 5 Appalachian State*	No. 12	Kidd Brewer Stadium; Boone, NC (NCAA Division I First Round)	CN8	L 27–28	14,040	
*Non-conference game; ^{†}Homecoming; Rankings from The Sports Network Poll released prior to the game; All times are in Eastern time
