= 2007 Towson Tigers football team =

American college football season

2007 Towson Tigers football
- Conference: Colonial Athletic Association
- Record: 3–8 (1–7 CAA)
- Head coach: Gordy Combs (16th season)
- Defensive coordinator: Bob Benson (2nd season)
- Home stadium: Johnny Unitas Stadium

2007 Colonial Athletic Association football standings
	Conf.			Overall
Team	W		L	W		L
North Division
No. 7 UMass x+^	7	–	1	10	–	3
Hofstra	4	–	4	7	–	4
No. 14 New Hampshire ^	4	–	4	7	–	5
Maine	3	–	5	4	–	7
Northeastern	2	–	6	3	–	8
Rhode Island	2	–	6	3	–	8
South Division
No. 5 Richmond x+^	7	–	1	11	–	3
No. 12 James Madison ^	6	–	2	8	–	4
No. 2 Delaware ^	5	–	3	11	–	4
Villanova	5	–	3	7	–	4
William & Mary	2	–	6	4	–	7
Towson	1	–	7	3	–	8
+ – Conference co-champions; x – Division champion/co-champions; ^ – FCS playoff participant; Rankings from The Sports Network poll

The 2007 Towson Tigers football team represented Towson University in the 2007 NCAA Division I FCS football season. They were led by 16th-year head coach Gordy Combs and played their home games at Johnny Unitas Stadium. They are a member of the Colonial Athletic Association. They finished the season 3–8, 1–7 in CAA play.

== Schedule ==
Date	Time	Opponent	Rank	Site	TV	Result	Attendance	Source
August 30		Central Connecticut State*		Johnny Unitas Stadium; Towson, MD		W 20–10		
September 8		at Morgan State*		Hughes Stadium; Baltimore, MD (The Battle for Greater Baltimore)		W 28–21	8,732	
September 15	12:00 pm	at No. 3 UMass	No. 23	McGuirk Stadium; Hadley, MA	TCN	L 13–36	8,218	
September 22	7:00 pm	No. 11 Delaware		Johnny Unitas Stadium; Towson, MD	CSN	L 7–27	10,856	
September 29	1:00 pm	at William & Mary		Zable Stadium; Williamsburg, VA		L 22–27	10,094	
October 6	12:00 pm	No. 14 Richmond		Johnny Unitas Stadium; Towson, MD	CSN	W 23–21	5,746	
October 13		No. 10 Hofstra^{†}		Johnny Unitas Stadium; Towson, MD		L 3–20		
October 20		at Colgate*		Andy Kerr Stadium; Hamilton, NY		L 17–27	5,227	
November 3		at Maine		Alfond Stadium; Orono, ME		L 13–16	2,562	
November 10		Villanova		Johnny Unitas Stadium; Towson, MD		L 12–14	3,959	
November 17	1:30 pm	at No. 14 James Madison		Bridgeforth Stadium; Harrisonburg, VA		L 13–23	13,661	
*Non-conference game; ^{†}Homecoming; Rankings from The Sports Network Poll released prior to the game; All times are in Eastern time
