= 2007 UMass Minutemen football team =

American college football season

2007 UMass Minutemen football

CAA co-champion

NCAA Division I Quarterfinal, L 27–34 vs. Southern Illinois
- Conference: Colonial Athletic Association
- North Division

Ranking
- Sports Network: No. 7
- Record: 10–3 (7–1 CAA)
- Head coach: Don Brown (4th season)
- Offensive coordinator: Kevin Morris (4th season)
- Offensive scheme: Pro-style
- Defensive coordinator: Keith Dudzinski (4th season)
- Base defense: 4–3
- Home stadium: Warren McGuirk Alumni Stadium

2007 Colonial Athletic Association football standings
| | Conf. | | | Overall |
| Team | W | | L | W | | L |
|---|---|---|---|---|---|---|
North Division
| No. 7 UMass x+^ | 7 | – | 1 | 10 | – | 3 |
| Hofstra | 4 | – | 4 | 7 | – | 4 |
| No. 14 New Hampshire ^ | 4 | – | 4 | 7 | – | 5 |
| Maine | 3 | – | 5 | 4 | – | 7 |
| Northeastern | 2 | – | 6 | 3 | – | 8 |
| Rhode Island | 2 | – | 6 | 3 | – | 8 |
South Division
| No. 5 Richmond x+^ | 7 | – | 1 | 11 | – | 3 |
| No. 12 James Madison ^ | 6 | – | 2 | 8 | – | 4 |
| No. 2 Delaware ^ | 5 | – | 3 | 11 | – | 4 |
| Villanova | 5 | – | 3 | 7 | – | 4 |
| William & Mary | 2 | – | 6 | 4 | – | 7 |
| Towson | 1 | – | 7 | 3 | – | 8 |
+ – Conference co-champions; x – Division champion/co-champions; ^ – FCS playoff participant; Rankings from The Sports Network poll

The 2007 UMass Minutemen football team represented the University of Massachusetts Amherst in the 2007 NCAA Division I FCS football season as a member of the Colonial Athletic Association (CAA). The team was coached by Don Brown and played its home games at Warren McGuirk Alumni Stadium in Hadley, Massachusetts. The Minutemen were coming off an appearance in the 2006 NCAA Championship Game and were looking to continue their success following their move from the Atlantic 10 Conference to the CAA. UMass repeated as conference champions but lost in the Quarterfinals of the NCAA Tournament, finishing the season with a record of 10–3 (7–1 CAA).

== Roster ==
- QB: Liam Coen
- RB: Matt Lawrence
- FB: Emil Igwenagu
- WR: Brandon London, Jeremy Horne, Tom Gilson, Julian Talley
- TE: Brad Listorti
- OL: Josh Samuda, Vladimir Ducasse
- DL: Brandon Collier
- SS: Jeromy Miles
- K: Chris Koepplin

== Schedule ==
| Date | Time | Opponent | Rank | Site | TV | Result | Attendance | Source |
|---|---|---|---|---|---|---|---|---|
| September 1 | 1:00 p.m. | Holy Cross* | No. 3 | McGuirk Stadium; Hadley, MA | | W 40–30 | 12,264 | |
| September 8 | 1:00 p.m. | at Colgate* | No. 2 | Andy Kerr Stadium; Hamilton, NY | TWCS | W 35–17 | 3,211 | |
| September 15 | 12:00 p.m. | No. 23 Towson | No. 3 | McGuirk Stadium; Hadley, MA | CN8 | W 36–13 | 8,218 | |
| September 22 | 2:30 p.m. | at Maine | No. 3 | Alfond Stadium; Orono, ME | CN8 | W 38–7 | 6,167 | |
| September 29 | 1:00 p.m. | at No. 12 (AP/FBS) Boston College* | No. 2 | Alumni Stadium; Chestnut Hill, MA (rivalry) | ESPN360 | L 14–24 | 44,111 | |
| October 13 | 1:00 p.m. | Villanova | No. 4 | McGuirk Stadium; Hadley, MA | | W 32–24 ^{4OT} | 16,174 | |
| October 20 | 12:00 p.m. | Northeastern^{†} | No. 4 | McGuirk Stadium; Hadley, MA | CN8 | W 24–7 | 14,189 | |
| October 27 | 1:00 p.m. | at William & Mary | No. 4 | Zable Stadium; Williamsburg, VA | | W 48–34 | 10,178 | |
| November 3 | 12:00 p.m. | at Rhode Island | No. 3 | Meade Stadium; Kingston, RI | | L 6–12 ^{OT} | 4,118 | |
| November 10 | 12:00 p.m. | No. 14 New Hampshire | No. 8 | McGuirk Stadium; Hadley, MA (rivalry) | CN8 | W 27–7 | 14,190 | |
| November 17 | 12:00 p.m. | at No. 22 Hofstra | No. 8 | Shuart Stadium; Hempstead, NY | ESPNU | W 27–5 | 2,915 | |
| November 24 | 12:00 p.m. | No. 25 Fordham* | No. 7 | McGuirk Stadium; Hadley, MA (FCS First Round) | ESPNU | W 49–35 | 5,224 | |
| December 1 | 3:15 p.m. | at No. 4 Southern Illinois* | No. 7 | McAndrew Stadium; Carbondale, IL (FCS Quarterfinals) | ESPN GamePlan (NESN, MASN, TWCS, Cox Sports) | L 27–34 | 6,560 | |
*Non-conference game; ^{†}Homecoming; Rankings from The Sports Network Poll released prior to the game; All times are in Eastern time
