= 2007 New Hampshire Wildcats football team =

American college football season

2007 New Hampshire Wildcats football

FCS Playoffs First Round, L 35–38 vs. Northern Iowa
- Conference: Colonial Athletic Association

Ranking
- Sports Network: No. 14
- FCS Coaches: No. 14
- Record: 7–5 (4–4 CAA)
- Head coach: Sean McDonnell (9th season)
- Offensive coordinator: Sean Devine
- Home stadium: Cowell Stadium

2007 Colonial Athletic Association football standings
	Conf.			Overall
Team	W		L	W		L
North Division
No. 7 UMass x+^	7	–	1	10	–	3
Hofstra	4	–	4	7	–	4
No. 14 New Hampshire ^	4	–	4	7	–	5
Maine	3	–	5	4	–	7
Northeastern	2	–	6	3	–	8
Rhode Island	2	–	6	3	–	8
South Division
No. 5 Richmond x+^	7	–	1	11	–	3
No. 12 James Madison ^	6	–	2	8	–	4
No. 2 Delaware ^	5	–	3	11	–	4
Villanova	5	–	3	7	–	4
William & Mary	2	–	6	4	–	7
Towson	1	–	7	3	–	8
+ – Conference co-champions; x – Division champion/co-champions; ^ – FCS playoff participant; Rankings from The Sports Network poll

The 2007 New Hampshire Wildcats football team represented the University of New Hampshire in the 2007 NCAA Division I FCS football season. The Wildcats were led by ninth-year head coach Sean McDonnell and played their home games at Cowell Stadium in Durham, New Hampshire. They were a member of the Colonial Athletic Association. They finished the season 7–5, 4–4 in CAA play. They received an at-large bid into the FCS playoffs, where they lost in the first round to Northern Iowa.

== Schedule ==
Date	Time	Opponent	Rank	Site	TV	Result	Attendance	Source
September 8	3:30 pm	at No. 10 James Madison	No. 5	Bridgeforth Stadium; Harrisonburg, VA	CN8	L 24–42	14,021	
September 15	4:30 pm	at Marshall*	No. 12	Joan C. Edwards Stadium; Huntington, WV		W 48–35	27,255	
September 22	12:00 pm	Dartmouth*	No. 10	Cowell Stadium; Durham, NH (rivalry)	WMUR	W 52–31	9,560	
September 29	3:30 pm	at No. 25 Richmond	No. 11	UR Stadium; Richmond, VA	CN8	L 38–45	8,995	
October 6	12:00 pm	No. 11 Delaware	No. 15	Cowell Stadium; Durham, NH	CN8	W 35–30	7,115	
October 13	12:00 pm	Iona^{†}	No. 13	Cowell Stadium; Durham, NH	UNHTV	W 49–21	11,068	
October 20	4:00 pm	at No. 10 Hofstra	No. 11	James M. Shuart Stadium; Hempstead, NY		W 40–3	5,688	
October 27	12:00 pm	Rhode Island	No. 8	Cowell Stadium; Durham, NH	NESN	W 49–36	6,015	
November 3	12:00 pm	Northeastern	No. 8	Cowell Stadium; Durham, NH	UNHTV	L 13–31	3,470	
November 10	12:00 pm	at No. 8 UMass	No. 14	Warren McGuirk Alumni Stadium; Hadley, MA (rivalry)	CN8	L 7–27	14,190	
November 17	12:00 pm	Maine	No. 20	Cowell Stadium; Durham, NH (Battle for the Brice–Cowell Musket)		W 39–14	6,222	
November 24	7:30 pm	at No. 1 Northern Iowa*	No. 17	UNI-Dome; Cedar Falls, IA (NCAA Division I First Round)	Mediacom/CFU	L 35–38	16,015	
*Non-conference game; ^{†}Homecoming; Rankings from The Sports Network Poll released prior to the game; All times are in Eastern time
