= Matt Marcorelle =

American football player (born 1987)

No. 11, 22
- Position: Defensive end

Personal information
- Born: July 26, 1987 (age 39); Fort Pierce, Florida, U.S.
- Listed height: 6 ft 3 in (1.91 m)
- Listed weight: 250 lb (113 kg)

Career information
- High school: John Carroll Catholic (Fort Pierce)
- College: Delaware
- NFL draft: 2011: undrafted

Career history
- Houston Texans (2011)*; Georgia Force (2012); Jacksonville Sharks (2013); Orlando Predators (2014)*
- * Offseason or practice squad member only

Career AFL statistics
- Tackles: 38
- Sacks: 10
- Forced Fumbles: 4
- Fumble Recoveries: 2
- Stats at ArenaFan.com

Matthew Marcorelle (born July 26, 1987) is an American former professional football defensive end. He was signed by the Houston Texans as an undrafted free agent in 2011. He played college football at University of Delaware.
