= 2007 Richmond Spiders football team =

American college football season

2007 Richmond Spiders football

CAA co-champion
- Conference: Colonial Athletic Association
- South

Ranking
- Sports Network: No. 5
- FCS Coaches: No. 4
- Record: 11–3 (7–1 CAA)
- Head coach: Dave Clawson (4th season)
- Offensive coordinator: Bill Durkin (run only) (11th season)
- Defensive coordinator: Russ Huesman (4th season)
- Home stadium: University of Richmond Stadium

2007 Colonial Athletic Association football standings
	Conf.			Overall
Team	W		L	W		L
North Division
No. 7 UMass x+^	7	–	1	10	–	3
Hofstra	4	–	4	7	–	4
No. 14 New Hampshire ^	4	–	4	7	–	5
Maine	3	–	5	4	–	7
Northeastern	2	–	6	3	–	8
Rhode Island	2	–	6	3	–	8
South Division
No. 5 Richmond x+^	7	–	1	11	–	3
No. 12 James Madison ^	6	–	2	8	–	4
No. 2 Delaware ^	5	–	3	11	–	4
Villanova	5	–	3	7	–	4
William & Mary	2	–	6	4	–	7
Towson	1	–	7	3	–	8
+ – Conference co-champions; x – Division champion/co-champions; ^ – FCS playoff participant; Rankings from The Sports Network poll

The 2007 Richmond Spiders football team represented the University of Richmond during the 2007 NCAA Division I FCS football season. Richmond competed as a member of the Colonial Athletic Association (CAA) and played their home games at the University of Richmond Stadium.

The Spiders were led by fourth-year head coach Dave Clawson. Richmond finished the regular season with a 9–2 overall record and 7–1 record in conference play, sharing the CAA title with the University of Massachusetts Amherst. With Massachusetts having won the CAA's automatic berth to the FCS playoffs on a coin flip, the Spiders were awarded an at-large playoff berth. At home they defeated Eastern Kentucky, and then on the road, Richmond beat Wofford. In the semifinals, Richmond fell on the road to eventual national champion Appalachian State.

== Schedule ==
Date	Time	Opponent	Rank	Site	TV	Result	Attendance	Source
September 1	7:00 pm	at Vanderbilt*		Vanderbilt Stadium; Nashville, TN		L 17–41	32,215	
September 8	12:30 pm	at Northeastern		Parsons Field; Boston, MA		W 49–14	4,167	
September 22	1:00 pm	at Bucknell*		Christy Mathewson–Memorial Stadium; Lewisburg, PA		W 45–14	2,474	
September 29	3:30 pm	No. 11 New Hampshire	No. 25	University of Richmond Stadium; Richmond, VA	CN8	W 45–38	8,995	
October 6	12:00 pm	at Towson	No. 14	Johnny Unitas Stadium; Towson, MD	CSN	L 21–23	5,746	
October 13	3:30 pm	Stony Brook*	No. 20	University of Richmond Stadium; Richmond, VA		W 42–0	5,150	
October 20	3:30 pm	Rhode Island	No. 18	University of Richmond Stadium; Richmond, VA		W 38–6	5,550	
October 27	12:00 pm	at No. 6 James Madison	No. 14	Bridgeforth Stadium; Harrisonburg, VA	CSN	W 17–16	14,009	
November 3	3:30 pm	No. 23 Villanova^{†}	No. 11	University of Richmond Stadium; Richmond, VA	CN8	W 35–27	7,126	
November 10	1:00 pm	at No. 6 Delaware	No. 9	Delaware Stadium; Newark, DE		W 62–56 ^{5OT}	21,187	
November 17	12:00 pm	William & Mary	No. 7	University of Richmond Stadium; Richmond, VA (I-64 Bowl)	CSN	W 31–20	7,652	
November 24	6:00 pm	No. 9 Eastern Kentucky*	No. 6	University of Richmond Stadium; Richmond, VA (NCAA Division I First Round)		W 31–14	3,253	
December 1	7:00 pm	at No. 11 Wofford*	No. 6	Gibbs Stadium; Spartanburg, SC (NCAA Division I Quarterfinal)	ESPNGP	W 21–10	8,500	
December 7	8:00 pm	at No. 5 Appalachian State*	No. 6	Kidd Brewer Stadium; [Boone, NC (NCAA Division I Semifinal)	ESPN2	L 35–55	24,140	
*Non-conference game; ^{†}Homecoming; Rankings from The Sports Network Poll released prior to the game; All times are in Eastern time
