= Robbie Agnone =

American football player (born 1985)

Profile
- Position: Tight end

Personal information
- Born: October 2, 1985 (age 41); Etters, Pennsylvania, U.S.
- Listed height: 6 ft 6 in (1.98 m)
- Listed weight: 260 lb (118 kg)

Career information
- College: Delaware
- NFL draft: 2009: undrafted

Career history
- Washington Redskins (2009)*; New England Patriots (2009–2010)*; Atlanta Falcons (2010–2011)*
- * Offseason or practice squad member only

Robert Victor Agnone (born October 2, 1985) is an American former professional football tight end. He was signed by the Washington Redskins as an undrafted free agent in 2009. He was also a member of the New England Patriots and Atlanta Falcons. He played college football first for the University of Pittsburgh and then for the University of Delaware.

== Early life ==
Agnone attended Red Land High School in Lewisberry, Pennsylvania. He earned three varsity letters in football. As a junior, he started at wide receiver and finished the season with 30 receptions for 429 yards (14.3 avg.) and eight touchdowns. He switched to quarterback as a senior and passed for 1,490 yards and 13 touchdowns. He earned first-team All-Mid Penn Commonwealth Division honors at quarterback and received honorable mention all-state recognition. He was also a four-year letterman in basketball, receiving multiple scholarship offers and twice earning "Big 15" honors.

== College career ==
After graduating from high school, Agnone attended the University of Pittsburgh beginning in 2004. He redshirted his freshman season, while seeing time at quarterback in drills. He played in one game in 2005. He transferred to the University of Delaware during the winter, and took part in that school's spring drills. He joined quarterback Joe Flacco and tight end Ben Patrick in the 2006 season, making 17 catches on the season for 241 yards. In his 2007 junior season, Agnone took the starting job from a graduated Patrick, 38 catches for 484 yards and was named an Honorable Mention The Sports Network All-American. In 2008, he caught 16 passes for 161 yards.

== Professional career ==
=== Washington Redskins ===
Agnone signed with the Washington Redskins as an undrafted free agent following the 2009 NFL draft. He was waived by the Redskins on September 5, 2009, during final cuts.

=== New England Patriots ===
Agnone was signed to the New England Patriots practice squad on September 8, 2009. He was placed on the practice squad/injured reserve list on November 3, where he spent the remainder of the season before being re-signed to a future contract on January 12, 2010. He was waived by the Patriots on May 21, 2010.

=== Atlanta Falcons ===
Agnone was signed to the Atlanta Falcons practice squad on July 31, 2010. He spent most of the 2010 season on the team's practice squad/injured reserve list and was waived by the team the following year on August 1, 2011.
