= Joe Todd (American football) =

American football player (born 1979)

No. 54
- Position: Linebacker

Personal information
- Born: April 17, 1979; Mansfield, Massachusetts, U.S.
- Listed height: 6 ft 0 in (1.83 m)
- Listed weight: 225 lb (102 kg)

Career information
- High school: Mansfield
- College: Hofstra
- NFL draft: 2001: undrafted

Career history

Playing
- New York Jets (2001); Tampa Bay Buccaneers (2002)*
- * Offseason or practice squad member only

Coaching
- Iona (2005) Linebackers coach; New Hampshire (2006) Linebackers coach; Rhode Island (2007) Linebackers coach; Wagner (2008–2009) Linebackers coach; Dedham HS (MA) (2010) Assistant coach; Mansfield HS (MA) (2011–2012) Defensive coordinator; Milford HS (MA) (2013–2016) Head coach

Career NFL statistics
- Games played: 1
- Tackles: 1
- Stats at Pro Football Reference

Joseph Robert Todd (born April 17, 1979) is an American former professional football player who was a linebacker for one game with the New York Jets of the National Football League (NFL) in 2001. He played college football for the Hofstra Pride. He signed by the Tampa Bay Buccaneers in 2002 but did not make the roster. He was a high school football coach for the Milford Scarlet Hawks from 2013 to 2016.

== Head coaching record ==
Year	Team	Overall	Conference	Standing	Bowl/playoffs
Milford Scarlet Hawks () (2013–2016)
2013	Milford	2–9	1–4	5th	
2014	Milford	7–4	3–2	3rd	
2015	Milford	8–7	2–3	4th	
2016	Milford	7–5	3–2	3rd	
Milford:		24–25	9–11		
Total:		24–25			
