= 2007 Villanova Wildcats football team =

American college football season

2007 Villanova Wildcats football
- Conference: Atlantic 10 Conference
- South Division
- Record: 7–4 (5–3 A-10)
- Head coach: Andy Talley (23rd season)
- Offensive coordinator: Sam Venuto (9th season)
- Offensive scheme: Multiple spread
- Defensive coordinator: Mark Reardon (3rd season)
- Base defense: 4–2–5
- Home stadium: Villanova Stadium

2007 Colonial Athletic Association football standings
| | Conf. | | | Overall |
| Team | W | | L | W | | L |
|---|---|---|---|---|---|---|
North Division
| No. 7 UMass x+^ | 7 | – | 1 | 10 | – | 3 |
| Hofstra | 4 | – | 4 | 7 | – | 4 |
| No. 14 New Hampshire ^ | 4 | – | 4 | 7 | – | 5 |
| Maine | 3 | – | 5 | 4 | – | 7 |
| Northeastern | 2 | – | 6 | 3 | – | 8 |
| Rhode Island | 2 | – | 6 | 3 | – | 8 |
South Division
| No. 5 Richmond x+^ | 7 | – | 1 | 11 | – | 3 |
| No. 12 James Madison ^ | 6 | – | 2 | 8 | – | 4 |
| No. 2 Delaware ^ | 5 | – | 3 | 11 | – | 4 |
| Villanova | 5 | – | 3 | 7 | – | 4 |
| William & Mary | 2 | – | 6 | 4 | – | 7 |
| Towson | 1 | – | 7 | 3 | – | 8 |
+ – Conference co-champions; x – Division champion/co-champions; ^ – FCS playoff participant; Rankings from The Sports Network poll

The 2007 Villanova Wildcats football team was an American football team that represented the Villanova University as a member of the Atlantic 10 Conference during the 2007 NCAA Division I FCS football season. In their 23rd year under head coach Andy Talley, the team compiled a 7–4 record.

== Schedule ==
| Date | Opponent | Rank | Site | Result | Attendance | Source |
|---|---|---|---|---|---|---|
| September 1 | at Maryland* | | Byrd Stadium; College Park, MD | L 14–31 | 50,389 | |
| September 8 | at Lehigh* | | Goodman Stadium; Bethlehem, PA | W 30–20 | 9,261 | |
| September 15 | Maine | | Villanova Stadium; Villanova, PA | W 24–17 ^{OT} | 11,117 | |
| September 22 | Penn* | | Villanova Stadium; Villanova, PA | W 34–14 | 8,721 | |
| September 29 | at No. 9 James Madison | | Bridgeforth Stadium; Harrisonburg, VA | L 7–35 | 15,035 | |
| October 6 | William & Mary | | Villanova Stadium; Villanova, PA | W 63–24 | 8,721 | |
| October 13 | at No. 4 UMass | | McGuirk Stadium; Hadley, MA | L 24–32 ^{4OT} | 16,174 | |
| October 27 | No. 15 Hofstra | | Villanova Stadium; Villanova, PA | W 35–31 | 6,631 | |
| November 3 | at No. 11 Richmond | No. 23 | UR Stadium; Richmond, VA | L 27–35 | 7,126 | |
| November 10 | at Towson | | Johnny Unitas Stadium; Towson, MD | W 14–12 | 3,959 | |
| November 17 | No. 9 Delaware | | Villanova Stadium; Villanova, PA (Battle of the Blue) | W 16–10 | 10,817 | |
*Non-conference game; Rankings from The Sports Network Poll released prior to the game
