= 2007 Maine Black Bears football team =

American college football season

2007 Maine Black Bears football
- Conference: Colonial Athletic Association
- North Division
- Record: 4–7 (3–5 CAA)
- Head coach: Jack Cosgrove (15th season)
- Captains: John Wormuth; Patrick McCrossan; Bruno Dorismond
- Home stadium: Alfond Stadium

2007 Colonial Athletic Association football standings
	Conf.			Overall
Team	W		L	W		L
North Division
No. 7 UMass x+^	7	–	1	10	–	3
Hofstra	4	–	4	7	–	4
No. 14 New Hampshire ^	4	–	4	7	–	5
Maine	3	–	5	4	–	7
Northeastern	2	–	6	3	–	8
Rhode Island	2	–	6	3	–	8
South Division
No. 5 Richmond x+^	7	–	1	11	–	3
No. 12 James Madison ^	6	–	2	8	–	4
No. 2 Delaware ^	5	–	3	11	–	4
Villanova	5	–	3	7	–	4
William & Mary	2	–	6	4	–	7
Towson	1	–	7	3	–	8
+ – Conference co-champions; x – Division champion/co-champions; ^ – FCS playoff participant; Rankings from The Sports Network poll

The 2007 Maine Black Bears football team was an American football team that represented the University of Maine as a member of the Colonial Athletic Association (CAA) during the 2007 NCAA Division I FCS football season. In their 15th season under head coach Jack Cosgrove, the Black Bears compiled a 4–7 record (3–5 against conference opponents) and finished fourth in the CAA's North Division. John Wormuth, Patrick McCrossan, and Bruno Dorismond were the team captains.

== Schedule ==
Date	Time	Opponent	Site	TV	Result	Attendance	Source
September 1	6:00 p.m.	Monmouth	Alfond Stadium; Orono, ME		W 21–14	7,312	
September 8	7:00 p.m.	at Connecticut	Rentschler Field; East Hartford, CT	ESPN Plus	L 0–38	35,413	
September 15		at Villanova	Villanova Stadium; Villanova, PA		L 17–24 ^{OT}	11,117	
September 22	2:30 p.m.	No. 3 UMass	Alfond Stadium; Orono, ME	CN8	L 7–38	6,167	
October 6		at No. 12 Hofstra	James M. Shuart Stadium; Hempstead, NY		L 13–38		
October 13	3:00 p.m.	William & Mary	Alfond Stadium; Orono, ME		L 20–21	7,122	
October 20	3:00 p.m.	at Stony Brook	Kenneth P. LaValle Stadium; Stony Brook, NY		L 23–30 ^{2OT}	7,328	
October 27		at Northeastern	Parsons Field; Brookline, MA		W 20–14 ^{2OT}	4,340	
November 3		Towson	Alfond Stadium; Orono, ME		W 16–13	2,562	
November 10		Rhode Island	Alfond Stadium; Orono, ME		W 35–0		
November 17	12:00 p.m.	at No. 20 New Hampshire	Cowell Stadium; Durham, NH (Battle for the Brice–Cowell Musket)		L 14–39	6,222	
Rankings from The Sports Network Poll released prior to the game; All times are in Eastern time
