= Keith Stokes =

American gridiron football player (born 1978)

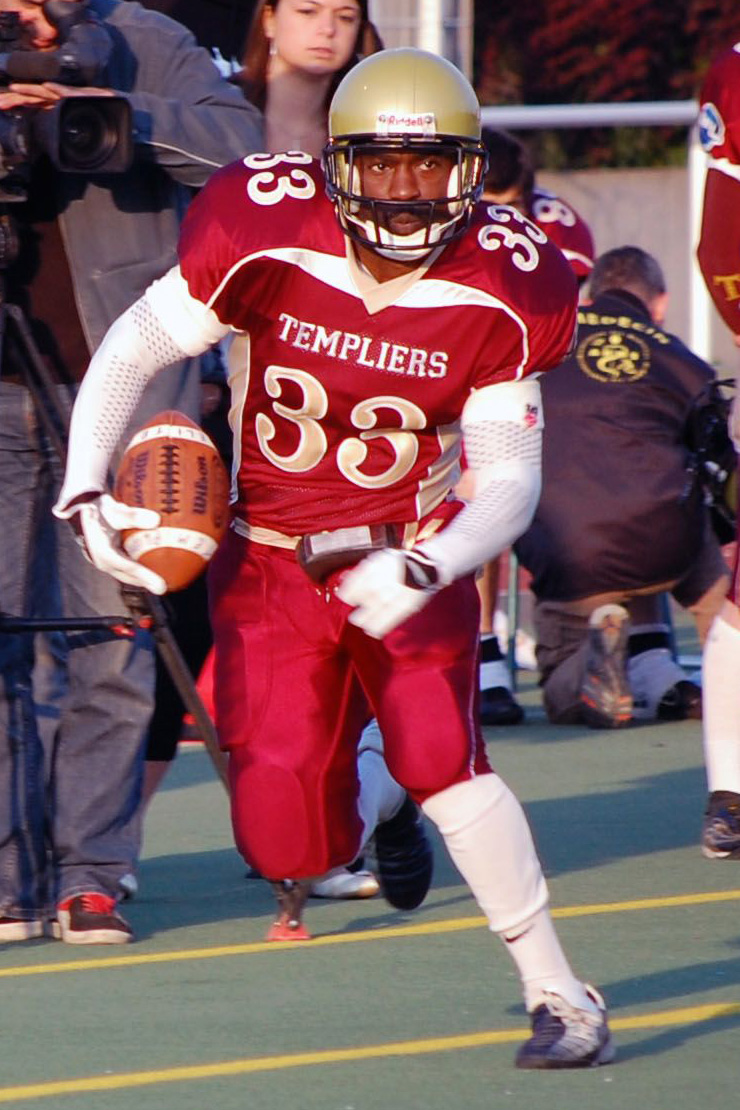
- Stokes with the Elancourt Templiers in 2009

No. 3, 12, 33
- Position: Wide receiver

Personal information
- Born: December 10, 1978 (age 47); Toms River, New Jersey, U.S.
- Listed height: 5 ft 7 in (1.70 m)
- Listed weight: 184 lb (83 kg)

Career information
- College: East Carolina
- NFL draft: 2001: undrafted

Career history
- San Francisco 49ers (2001)*; Montreal Alouettes (2002); Miami Dolphins (2003)*; Montreal Alouettes (2003); Winnipeg Blue Bombers (2004–2005); Toronto Argonauts (2006); Winnipeg Blue Bombers (2007); Manchester Wolves (2008); Edmonton Eskimos (2008); Toronto Argonauts (2008)*; Elancourt Templiers (2009); Harrisburg Stampede (2010); Philadelphia Soul (2011); Lehigh Valley Steelhawks (2012)*; Reading Express (2012); York Capitals (2013–2015); Pennsylvania Steam (2014)*; Central Penn Capitals (2016)*
- * Offseason or practice squad member only

Awards and highlights
- Grey Cup champion (2002); Frank M. Gibson Trophy (2002); John Agro Special Teams Award (2004); CFL All Star (2002, 2004); AIF champion (2015)

Career CFL statistics
- Receptions: 178
- Receiving yards: 2,517
- Receiving TDs: 10
- Punt Return yards-TDs: 3,734-9
- Kick Return yards-TDs: 4,132-1
- Stats at CFL.ca (archived)

Career AFL statistics
- Receptions: 78
- Receiving yards: 940
- Receiving TDs: 8
- Return yards: 1,200
- Return TDs: 2
- Stats at ArenaFan.com

Keith Stokes (born December 10, 1978) is an American former professional football wide receiver. Stokes was a two-time Canadian Football League (CFL) all star. He also starred in the French League Championnat Élite Division 1 in 2009 for the Elancourt Templiers. He has been a football coach after retiring as a player.

== Early life, family and education ==
Keith Stokes was born in Toms River, New Jersey.

== College career ==
Stokes attended Georgia Military College, a military junior college in Milledgeville, Georgia. As a sophomore, he was selected as an NJCAA All-American honoree and was named the Team MVP.

Stokes subsequently attended East Carolina University where he immediately made his mark for the East Carolina Pirates as a talented kick returner and big-play offensive weapon. In the fourth game of his career for the Pirates, he caught the game-winning 27-yard touchdown pass to defeat the #13 ranked Miami Hurricanes by a score of 27–23. The Pirates were down 20–3 at halftime in the emotional comeback victory, which was moved to Raleigh, North Carolina, from ECU's campus in Greenville, North Carolina, due to the after-effects of Hurricane Floyd. Stokes set team records as a punt returner. Stokes gained the most punt return yards in a single game with 168 in a 62–20 victory against Houston on November 11, 2000. He also possesses the best career average yards per punt return at 15.5 yards per return on 53 returns. His 94-yard punt return against Cincinnati in 1999 is the second-longest in school history. Stokes also returned a punt 71 yards for a touchdown against Texas Tech in the 2000 Galleryfurniture.com Bowl.

As a senior, although relatively short for the receiver position, he was able to utilize his agility and quickness to routinely create separation from defenders to lead the team in receptions and receiving yards. In 2000, Stokes led Conference USA in all-purpose yardage with 1,427 yards.

== Career ==
=== Professional football player ===
Stokes began his professional football career in the Canadian Football League. In 2002, he joined the Montreal Alouettes and that season was named the CFL's Most Outstanding Special Teams Player. In 2004, Stokes joined the Winnipeg Blue Bombers, won the John Agro Special Teams Award, and was named a 2004 CFL All-Star. He made the The Sports Network CFL Play of The Year for his August 13, 2005, touchdown while playing against the Hamilton Tiger-Cats. It was a 67-yard reception TD from Blue Bombers quarterback Kevin Glenn.

On September 29, 2008, Stokes was signed to return to the Toronto Argonauts and was released in February 2009.

In March 2009, Stokes was signed to the Elancourt Templiers, French team in the Ligue Élite de Football Américain. For his first drive in EFL he scored a touchdown. The Templiers finished the French league season with a 7–3 record and lost in the playoffs semi final to the Thonon Black Panthers.

In 2011, Stokes signed and played for the Philadelphia Soul of the Indoor Football League. For the 2012 IFL season, he signed to play with the Reading Express.

=== Other ===
After retiring from playing professional football, Stokes worked in football coaching. He was an assistant for special teams and offense for the BC Lions in 2019.
