= 2007 Miami RedHawks football team =

American college football season

2007 Miami RedHawks football

MAC East Division co-champion

MAC Championship Game, L 10–35 vs. Central Michigan
- Conference: Mid-American Conference
- East Division
- Record: 6–7 (5–2 MAC)
- Head coach: Shane Montgomery (3rd season)
- Offensive scheme: Multiple
- Defensive coordinator: Jay Hood (1st season)
- Base defense: 4–3
- Home stadium: Yager Stadium

2007 Mid-American Conference football standings
| | Div | | | Conf. | | | Overall |
| Team | W | | L | W | | L | W | | L |
|---|---|---|---|---|---|---|---|---|---|
East Division
| Miami (OH) xy | 4 | – | 2 | 5 | – | 2 | 6 | – | 7 |
| Bowling Green x | 4 | – | 2 | 6 | – | 2 | 8 | – | 5 |
| Buffalo x | 4 | – | 2 | 5 | – | 3 | 5 | – | 7 |
| Ohio | 3 | – | 3 | 4 | – | 4 | 6 | – | 6 |
| Temple | 3 | – | 3 | 4 | – | 4 | 4 | – | 8 |
| Akron | 2 | – | 4 | 3 | – | 5 | 4 | – | 8 |
| Kent State | 1 | – | 5 | 1 | – | 7 | 3 | – | 9 |
West Division
| Central Michigan xy$ | 4 | – | 1 | 6 | – | 1 | 8 | – | 6 |
| Ball State x | 4 | – | 1 | 5 | – | 2 | 7 | – | 6 |
| Eastern Michigan | 3 | – | 2 | 3 | – | 4 | 4 | – | 8 |
| Western Michigan | 2 | – | 3 | 3 | – | 4 | 5 | – | 7 |
| Toledo | 2 | – | 3 | 3 | – | 5 | 5 | – | 7 |
| Northern Illinois | 0 | – | 5 | 1 | – | 6 | 2 | – | 10 |
Championship: Central Michigan 35, Miami 10
$ – Conference champion; x – Division champion/co-champions; Due to an unbalanced conference schedule, the team with best division record within each division was awarded that division's championship game berth.

The 2007 Miami RedHawks football team represented the Miami University in the 2007 NCAA Division I FBS football season. The team was coached by Shane Montgomery and played their homes game in Yager Stadium in Oxford, Ohio.

== Preseason ==
The 2006 team had 2 wins and 10 losses which was the first losing record for the RedHawks since 1993. The 10 losses were the most since 1989. The 2006 team was hampered by injuries and inexperience. The injuries led Coach Montgomery to use younger players which will help experience level for the 2007 season. Key injuries included offensive linemen Charlie Norden and Matt McKeown and running back Brandon Murphy.

Miami was picked to finish fourth in the Mid-American Conference East Division by the MAC News Media Association for the 2007 season. The RedHawks garnered one first-place vote with Ohio University was predicted to finish first in the East Division with 15 first-place votes. Senior quarterback Mike Kokal returns to lead the offence for his second and final season as a starter. Kokal, threw for 2,419 yards and 14 touchdowns in the 2006 season. He was ranked 19th nationally in total offense. The RedHawks’ offense do have to replace Ryne Robinson finished his career as Miami's all-time leader in receiving yardage and punt return yardage and touchdowns. Sophomore Dustin Woods, who caught 25 passes for 506 yards and four touchdowns last season is expected take over as the leader of the receiver. Coach Montgomery stated before the season that he would not be opposed to using true freshmen wide receivers Chris Givens and Jamal Rogers.

The coaching staff remained basically intact for the 2007 season, except for the departure of defensive coordinator Travor Johnson who accepted another coaching job. Johnson was replaced by Jay Hood, who was the defensive line coach for the past two seasons. Jimmy Lindsey, who was an assistant coach at Gardner–Webb University was added to the staff to bring it up to full strength. Coach Montgomery did make changes to the staff including several promotions, and shuffling of responsibilities. DeAndre Smith was promoted to associate head coach from run game coordinator. Smith will continue to coach the running backs. Matt Hohman will take over Smith's former duties as running game coordinator.

== Schedule ==
| Date | Time | Opponent | Site | TV | Result | Attendance |
|---|---|---|---|---|---|---|
| August 30 | 7:00 pm | at Ball State | Scheumann Stadium; Muncie, IN | | W 14–13 | 15,488 |
| September 8 | 12:00 pm | at Minnesota* | Metrodome; Minneapolis, MN | BTN | L 35–41 ^{2OT} | 45,383 |
| September 15 | 12:00 pm | Cincinnati* | Yager Stadium; Oxford, OH (Victory Bell) | ESPN Plus | L 10–47 | 22,421 |
| September 22 | 3:30 pm | at Colorado* | Folsom Field; Boulder, CO | | L 0–42 | 45,243 |
| September 30 | 3:00 pm | Syracuse* | Yager Stadium; Oxford, OH | ONN, ESPN Plus | W 17–14 | 16,800 |
| October 6 | 3:00 pm | at Kent State | Dix Stadium; Kent, OH | FSN Ohio | W 20–13 | 17,165 |
| October 13 | 3:00 pm | Bowling Green^{†} | Yager Stadium; Oxford, OH | FSN Ohio | W 47–14 | 16,148 |
| October 20 | 12:00 pm | at Temple | Lincoln Financial Field; Philadelphia, PA | ESPN Plus | L 17–24 | 21,041 |
| October 27 | 2:00 pm | at Vanderbilt* | Vanderbilt Stadium; Nashville, TN | | L 13–24 | 26,450 |
| November 3 | 3:00 pm | Buffalo | Yager Stadium; Oxford, OH | ONN, ESPN Plus | W 31–28 | 12,288 |
| November 14 | 7:35 pm | Akron | Yager Stadium; Oxford, OH | ESPN2 | W 7–0 | 13,274 |
| November 24 | 2:00 pm | at Ohio | Peden Stadium; Athens, OH (Battle of the Bricks) | | L 29–38 | 11,438 |
| December 1 | 11:00 am | vs. Central Michigan | Ford Field; Detroit, MI (MAC Championship Game) | ESPN2 | L 10–35 | 25,013 |
*Non-conference game; ^{†}Homecoming

== Coaching staff ==
| Name | Position | Years | Alma mater (Year) |
|---|---|---|---|
| Shane Montgomery | Head coach | 2 | North Carolina State (1990) |
| DeAndre Smith | Associate head coach Running backs | 1 | Southwest Missouri State University (1994) |
| Jay Hood | Defensive coordinator | 0 | Ohio Wesleyan University (1986) |
| Brian Von Bergen | Passing coordinator Wide receivers | 8 | University of Illinois (1992) |
| Matt Hohman | Running Game coordinator Offensive Line | 2 | Miami University (1995) |
| Craig Aukerman | Co. Special Teams Coord. | 2 | University of Findlay (1999) |
| Jimmy Lindsey | Co. Special Teams Coord. Defensive Ends | 0 | University of Tennessee at Chattanooga (2001) |
| Mike Bath | Tight ends | 1 | Miami University (2001) |
| Tim Cooper | Defensive backs | 3 | DePauw University (1997) |
| Rusty Wright | Defensive line | 2 | University of Tennessee at Chattanooga (1996) |

== Game summaries ==
=== Ball State ===
| | 1 | 2 | 3 | 4 | Total |
|---|---|---|---|---|---|
| RedHawks | 0 | 7 | 0 | 7 | 14 |
| Cardinals | 3 | 0 | 3 | 7 | 13 |

Brandon Murphy led the Miami RedHawks to a 14–13 victory over Ball State Cardinals. Murphy rushed for 123 yards and two touchdowns including a 6-yard touchdown run with 17 seconds left in the game. Murphy's game-winning touchdown was set up by 56-yard punt return by Eugene Harris, which gave Miami the ball on the Ball State 23 yard line. Ball State was led by quarterback Nate Davis who completed 19-of-36 passes for 198 yards including a 23-yard touchdown pass to Dante Love with 11:22 left in the fourth quarter.

=== Minnesota ===
| | 1 | 2 | 3 | 4 | OT | Total |
|---|---|---|---|---|---|---|
| RedHawks | 3 | 6 | 3 | 16 | 7 | 35 |
| Gophers | 7 | 7 | 0 | 14 | 13 | 41 |

Amir Pinnix ran for a 2-yard touchdown in the third overtime that let Minnesota to beat Miami by a score of 41–35. Minnesota took a 28–12 lead with 8:35 to play when Adam Weber threw a 5-yard TD to Ernie Wheelwright. Quarterback Daniel Raudabaugh replaced injured Mike Kokal and rallied Miami to 17 points in the final 6:35 of regulation, including a 61 yards at the end of the game to set up Trevor Cook's game-tying field goal. For the game Raudabaugh threw for 202 yards and two touchdowns. Several Miami player suffered injuries during the game including Joey Hudson to a knee injury on the second series of the game and starting tailback Brandon Murphy who also injured his knee in the fourth quarter.

=== Cincinnati ===
| | 1 | 2 | 3 | 4 | Total |
|---|---|---|---|---|---|
| Bearcats | 16 | 10 | 7 | 14 | 47 |
| RedHawks | 0 | 3 | 7 | 0 | 10 |

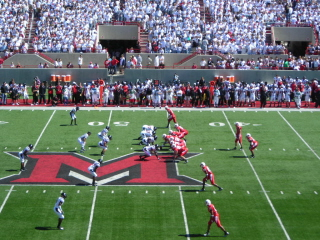
Miami RedHawk offence sets up against UC Bearcat Defense

Dustin Grutza, who started in place of the injured UC quarterback Ben Mauk threw for two scores to lead the University of Cincinnati Bearcats to a 47–10 win over Miami. UC defense dominated the game with a fumble recovery, three interceptions, a blocked punt, and five sacks.

=== Colorado ===
| | 1 | 2 | 3 | 4 | Total |
|---|---|---|---|---|---|
| RedHawks | 0 | 0 | 0 | 0 | 0 |
| Buffaloes | 7 | 21 | 7 | 7 | 42 |

The RedHawks were shut out for the first time since a 1993 loss to Ball State. In sophomore quarterback Daniel Raudabaugh's first start of the season, he completed 11 of 32 passes for only 95 yards. The Colorado Buffalo defense was never able to sack Raudabaugh, but they did not allow him time to set his feet for passes. Colorado outgained Miami 634–139 in total yardage. The Buffaloes’ offence rushed for 359 after only running for 134 total yards in three previous games.

=== Syracuse ===
| | 1 | 2 | 3 | 4 | Total |
|---|---|---|---|---|---|
| Orange | 0 | 0 | 7 | 7 | 14 |
| RedHawks | 0 | 14 | 0 | 3 | 17 |

Cory Jones, a fifth-year senior running back who hadn't played a game in his career until this season, gained 125 yards on 12 carries and scored two touchdowns to lead the RedHawks to a 17–14 win over Syracuse at Yager Stadium. For this game coach Montgomery adjusted the offense to focus more on the running game instead of passing attack. The RedHawks had 286 yards rushing which was the most since Miami's 1999 team ran for 399 in a 32–23 win over University of Akron. Mike Kokal returned to the starting lineup at quarterback replacing sophomore Daniel Raudabaugh who started at Colorado the week before, Kokal ran for 63 yards on 11 carries and threw for 150 yards while completing 13 of 26 passes. Montgomery started Kokal instead of Raudabaugh, because of this week's game plan that focused on the running game including having the quarterback run the ball. The victory Miami snaps seven-game home losing streak. Miami's victory was Syracuse's first loss to a Mid-American Conference team since the 1976 season, when Bowling Green beat Syracuse, 22–7. The Orange still had a chance to win at the end of the game. Syracuse had the ball on own 11 with 2:29 left and no timeouts. Orange quarterback Andrew Robinson was sacked by Morris Council on first down. Robinson then threw an incompletion on second down. He hit Rice Moss for a nine-yard gain on third down, and threw a pass batted down at the line on fourth. Miami took over on down and ran out the clock.

=== Kent State ===
| | 1 | 2 | 3 | 4 | Total |
|---|---|---|---|---|---|
| RedHawks | 10 | 0 | 7 | 3 | 20 |
| Flashes | 7 | 3 | 3 | 0 | 13 |

The RedHawks, without top running backs Brandon Murphy, Cory Jones and Andre Bratton, turned to its passing game to beat Kent State Golden Flashes by score of 20–13. The quarterback tandem of Daniel Raudabaugh and Mike Kokal, who suffered a knee injury on a second-quarter, combined for 310 passing yards. The Golden Flashes had a chance to win at the end of the game when the Flashes’ quarterback, Julian Edelman was pushed out of bounds at the 1-yard line. Miami took over on downs and killed the clock.

=== Bowling Green ===
| | 1 | 2 | 3 | 4 | Total |
|---|---|---|---|---|---|
| Falcons | 0 | 7 | 0 | 7 | 14 |
| RedHawks | 16 | 14 | 7 | 10 | 47 |

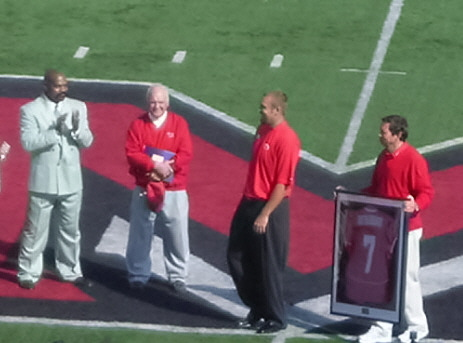
Ben Roethlisberger's number being retired before the BGSU game. Also pictured Bob Hitchens (far left) and John Pont (2nd from the left)

Before the game Miami University retired former quarterback Ben Roethlisberger's number and honored former head coach Terry Hoeppner with a moment of silence. After the pre game activities, Miami beat Bowling Green, 47–14, as Austin Sykes ran for a career-high 127 yards including two touchdowns. Eugene Harris scored his first two career touchdowns, including a 73-yard pass that helped the RedHawks open up a 30–7 halftime lead. The RedHawk defense controlled the game by sacking Falcons' quarterback Tyler Sheehan six times and limited him to a 140 yards passing.

=== Temple ===
| | 1 | 2 | 3 | 4 | Total |
|---|---|---|---|---|---|
| Redhawks | 7 | 0 | 0 | 10 | 17 |
| Owls | 7 | 7 | 7 | 3 | 24 |

Miami lost its first in Mid-American Conference game to Temple by a score of 24–17. Temple built a 24–7 lead before Miami scored 10 points over the final minutes of the game. Dan Raudabaugh one-yard touchdown pass to tight end Tom Crabtree with 1:19 left to play to put the RedHawks within 10 points, 24–10. After recovering the ball on an on-side kick, Miami went down and Nathan Parseghian kicked a 33-yard field goal to put the RedHawks within 7 points with nine seconds remaining. The RedHawks recovered their second on-side kick with four seconds left but Raudabaugh's was intercepted to end the game.

=== Vanderbilt ===
| | 1 | 2 | 3 | 4 | Total |
|---|---|---|---|---|---|
| Redhawks | 3 | 7 | 3 | 0 | 13 |
| Commodores | 7 | 3 | 7 | 7 | 24 |

Miami lost to Vanderbilt of the Southeastern Conference by the score of 24–13. Three straight Vanderbilt turnovers in the second quarter allowed Miami to lead 13–10 midway through the third quarter. Miami's only touchdown came when quarterback Daniel Radabaugh connected with Jamal Rogers for a 40-yard touchdown pass with 6:16 left in 2nd quarter. With 4:54 remaining in the third quarter backup quarterback Chris Nickson ran for a 2-yard touchdown allowing the Commodores to take a 17–13 lead. Nickson replaced starting quarterback Mackenzi Adams who left the game because of a chest injury. During the game Vanderbilt's Earl Bennett became the leading receiver in Southeastern Conference history. For the game he had eight catches for a career total of 215, breaking Craig Yeast's record of 208.

=== Buffalo ===
| | 1 | 2 | 3 | 4 | Total |
|---|---|---|---|---|---|
| Bulls | 7 | 10 | 3 | 8 | 28 |
| Redhawks | 3 | 14 | 14 | 0 | 31 |

Miami beat Buffalo by a score of 31–28. RedHawks were led by Daniel Raudabaugh who completed 20 of 26 passes including two touchdowns. Raudabaugh first touchdown was a 17 yards pass to Cory Jones in the first quarter and 6 yards to Eugene Harris in the third. RedHawks were also helped by Thomas Merriweather who rushed for two touchdowns while fellow running back Cory Jones ran for 125 yards. The Bulls were led by James Starks who finished with 154 yards on 19 carries and quarterback Drew Willy who completed 33 of 45 passes for 217 yards.

=== Akron ===
| | 1 | 2 | 3 | 4 | Total |
|---|---|---|---|---|---|
| Zips | 0 | 0 | 0 | 0 | 0 |
| RedHawks | 0 | 0 | 0 | 7 | 7 |

Coming into the game Miami was tied with Buffalo for first place in the Mid-American Conference East Division. The RedHawks hold all the tiebreaker advantages and would represent the East in the MAC Championship Game by winning their final two regular-season games or a Buffalo loss. Coach Montgomery's main concern coming into the game was how to contain the Zips offense, led by sophomore tailbacks Alex Allen and Bryan Williams along with the senior wide receiver Jabari Arthur. The defensive game plan had to take into account two different styles of play depending on who was playing quarterback for the Zips. The Zips could play either Chris Jaquemain, who is more of a passing quarterback or Carlton Jackson who is more of a running quarterback.

Miami prevailed 7–0 in a game dominated by defense. Neither offence scored during the game, with Miami's touchdown coming on the defensive side of the ball. RedHawks defensive lineman Craig Mester picked up a fumble midway through the fourth quarter and rumbled seven yards for the only score. The costly turnover came shortly after University of Akron coach J. D. Brookhart replaced Chris Jacquemain with Carlton Jackson because Akron had struggling to move the ball consistently. On a third-and-13 at Zips 20-yard line Jackson dropped back to pass and was pressured by Miami's Clayton Mullins, who forced the fumble. Mester scooped up the ball and became the hero for the RedHawks. Miami outgained Akron 320 yard to 216 yard but was hampered by four turnovers. Miami's Daniel Raudabaugh was responsible had three interceptions in back-to-back-to-back possessions spanning the second and third quarters. All three were intercepted in the endzone. The game marked the first Miami shutout since a 49–0 victory against Indiana State in 2004. And the first MAC shutout since a 49–0 win against Buffalo in 2002.

=== Ohio U ===
| | 1 | 2 | 3 | 4 | Total |
|---|---|---|---|---|---|
| RedHawks | 7 | 10 | 3 | 9 | 29 |
| Bobcats | 7 | 0 | 21 | 10 | 38 |

Coming into the game Miami had already clinched a spot in the Mid-American Conference Championship game due to a Bowling Green victory over Buffalo a week earlier. With a victory of over Ohio, Miami could have clinched outright possession of the Mid-American Conference East Division and a bowl bid. For the second straight week the RedHawks' defense had to prepare for a team with a running quarterback (Theo Scott) and a passing quarterback (Brad Bower).

The RedHawks led 17–7 at halftime. Ohio switched quarterbacks for the second half, replacing Theo Scott with Brad Bower, and scored three quick touchdowns to take a 28–17 lead. Two of the touchdowns were help by great field position because of two interceptions thrown by Danial Raudabaugh on Miami's first two position of the second half. Miami's Nathan Parseghian tied a school record with five field goals, with the RedHawks unable to push the ball in the endzone in the second half. For the game Miami outgained the Bobcats 379 to 199 yards but Ohio's placekicker Michael Braunstein sealed the victory for Ohio with a 40-yard field goal that gave Ohio a 38–29 lead with 2:26 remaining.

=== MAC Championship Game: Central Michigan ===
| | 1 | 2 | 3 | 4 | Total |
|---|---|---|---|---|---|
| RedHawks | 0 | 0 | 3 | 7 | 10 |
| Chippewas | 7 | 0 | 7 | 21 | 35 |

Central Michigan quarterback Dan LeFevour ran for 170 yards and threw for 185, leading the Chippewas to a 35–10 over Miami for their second straight Mid-American Conference championship. Miami's defense was able to contain LeFevour in the first half, but Miami's offense wasn't able to take advantage. Miami only scored one touchdown, a 12-yard pass from Daniel Raudabaugh to Armand Robinson with 9:09 left in the game to shave CMU's lead to 11 points (21–10). Central answered with two more touchdowns, a 7-yard run by Ontario Sneed and a 28-yard run by LeFevour.

== Postseason ==
=== Awards ===
- Clayton Mullins, Mid-American Conference Defensive Player of the Year, First-team All-Mid-American Conference outside linebacker
- Joey Hudson – Second-team All-Mid-American Conference inside linebacker
- Dave DiFranco – Third-team All-Mid-American Conference offensive lineman
- Joe Coniglio – Third-team All-Mid-American Conference down lineman
- Jake Richardson – Third-team All-Mid-American Conference punter
