= Division 1 Elite Championship =

French league of American football

Championnat Élite Division 1
- Sport: American football
- First season: 1982
- No. of teams: 12, in two six-team divisions
- Country: France
- Most recent champion: Thonon Black Panthers (2026)
- Most titles: La Courneuve Flash (12)
- Broadcaster: Sport en France
- Website: FFFA.org

The Championnat Élite Division 1 (French for 'Division 1 Elite Championship') is the top-level American football league of France. The league was founded in 1982.

== History ==
American football was introduced to France in the early 20th century, but for decades it remained an infrequent activity, practised only by American touring teams and wartime servicemen.
The formation of NATO in 1949 allowed for U.S. military settlements in France, and in turn the establishment of senior and high school teams representing these bases. They mainly competed in cross-border leagues sanctioned by the U.S. Air Force and U.S. Army, although some seasons featured a conference consisting solely of France-based armed forces teams.

While some French citizens attended the games, actual participation by locals remained negligible and the sport quickly declined when French president Charles de Gaulle withdrew France from NATO's military command, evicting American troops from the country in 1967. Nonetheless, a few modern era French teams claim the lineage of those military organizations: the Châteauroux Sabres are named after an eponymous team from the now decommissioned Châteauroux-Déols Air Base.

It was not until 1980 that a physical education teacher, Laurent Plegelatte, created the first "born and bred" French team, the Spartacus de Paris. The same year, he founded and chaired the National Committee for the Development of American Football. The Ligue Élite de Football Américain was created in 1982 under the leadership of Laurent Plegelatte with four participants. The Spartacus de Paris were the first ever champions of the Ligue Élite de Football Américain, but are now a defunct team as of 1993. 1983 saw a change of leadership from Laurent Plegelatte to Michel Gofman.

The club Ours de Toulouse claims a French American football attendance record of over 11,000 for a 1990 game against the Moscow Bears played at Toulouse Stadium.

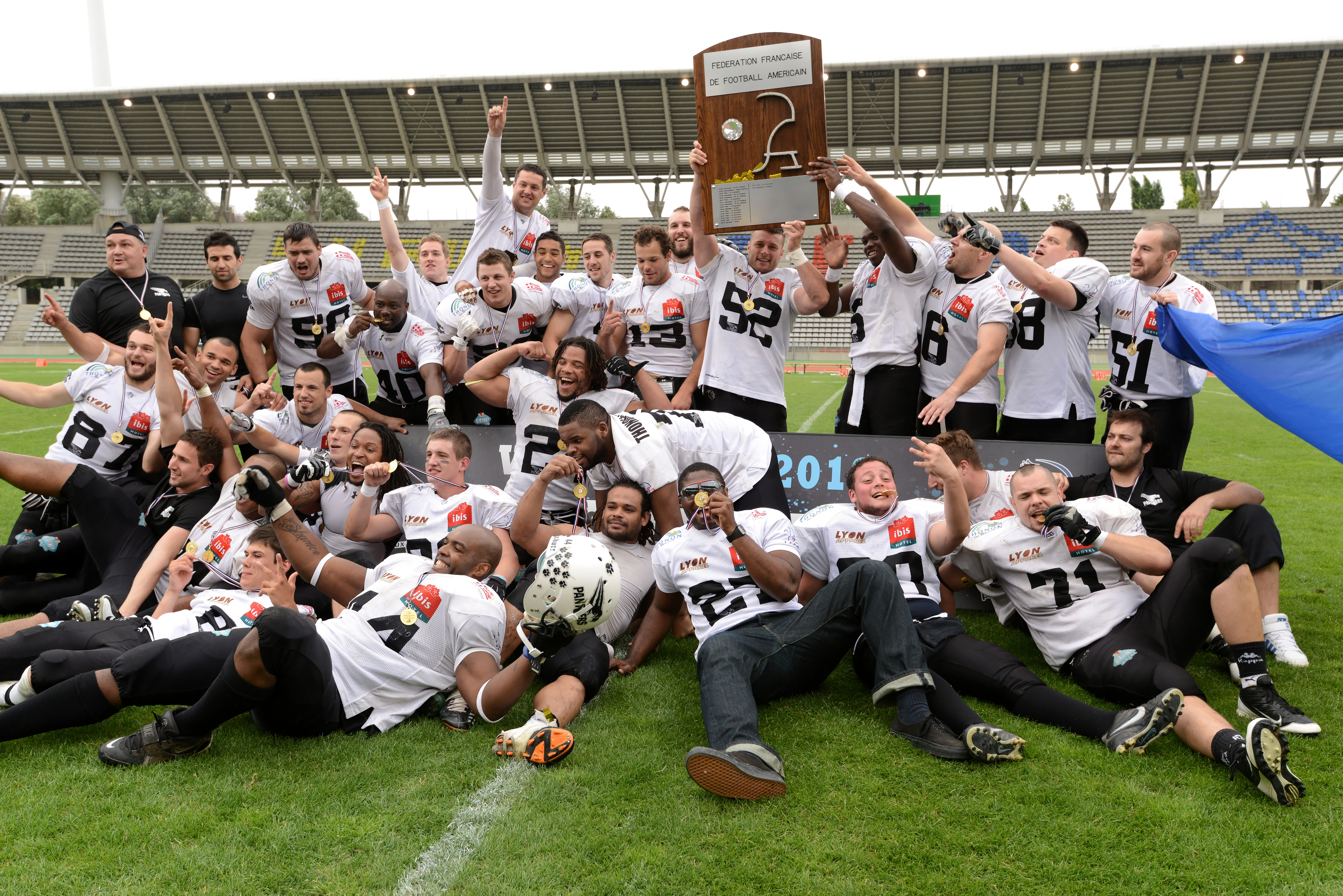
Thonon Black Panthers celebrating their 2013 title with the Casque de Diamant championship trophy

== League set-up ==
The league is partitioned into two conferences, each with six teams. The top three teams of each conference enter the playoffs. Until 1994, the final was called Casque d'Or (French for 'Gold Helmet'). Since 1995, the championship game has been called Casque de Diamant (French for 'Diamond Helmet').

== Trophy ==
Although the championship game is called the Diamond Helmet, the winners' trophy does not have the shape of a helmet. It is a shield similar to those awarded to the French champions of other rugby football codes, such as the Bouclier de Brennus and the Trophée Max-Rousié.

== Teams ==
=== Active teams ===
| Team | City/Departement | Stadium | Founded |
North Conference
| La Courneuve Flash | La Courneuve, Seine-Saint-Denis | Stade Marville | 1984 |
| Diables Rouges de Villepinte | Villepinte, Seine-Saint-Denis | Stade Laurent Lacans | 2006 |
| Météores de Fontenay | Fontenay-sous-Bois, Val-de-Marne | Stade André Laurent | 1981 |
| Molosses d'Asnières | Asnières-sur-Seine, Hauts-de-Seine | Jacques Anquetil Stadium and Léo Lagrange Stadium | 1992 |
| Thonon Black Panthers | Thonon-les-Bains, Haute-Savoie | Stade Joseph-Moynat | 1987 |
| Leopards of Rouen | Rouen, Indre-et-Loire | Stade France 98 | 1996 |
South Conference
| Aix-en-Provence Argonautes | Aix-en-Provence, Bouches-du-Rhône | Stade Georges-Carcassonne | 1986 |
| Blue Stars de Marseille | Marseille, Bouches-du-Rhône | Pierre-Delort Stadium | 1994 |
| Cannes Iron Mask | Cannes, Alpes-Maritimes | Stade Pierre de Coubertin | 1991 |
| Centaures de Grenoble | Grenoble, Isère | Stade Lesdiguières | 1985 |
| Grizzlys Catalans | Perpignan, Pyrénées-Orientales | Parc des Sports de Perpignan | 2012 |
| Ours de Toulouse | Toulouse, Haute-Garonne | Stades des Argoulets | 1986 |

== Championship Game ==
Results of the Ligue Élite de Football Américain championship.
| Season | Edition | Date | Stadium | Winner | Score | Loser |
|---|---|---|---|---|---|---|
Casque d'Or (Golden helmet)
| 1982 | I | 1982 | Vélodrome de Vincennes | Spartacus de Paris | 44–0 | Météores de Nogent |
| 1983 | II | May 21, 1983 | Stade Jean-Bouin | Spartacus de Paris (2) | 34–14 | Anges Bleus de Joinville |
| 1984 | III | 1984 | Stade Jean-Bouin | Anges Bleus de Joinville | 20–0 | Spartacus de Paris |
| 1985 | IV | 1985 | Stade Jean-Bouin | Paris Jets | 6–0 | Challengers de Paris |
| 1986 | V | 1986 | Stade Jean-Bouin | Anges Bleus de Joinville (2) | 20–2 | Spartacus de Paris |
| 1987 | VI | June 21, 1987 | Stade Jean-Bouin | Castors de Paris | 75–0 | Paris Jets |
| 1988 | VII | June 26, 1988 | Stade Jean-Bouin | Castors de Paris (2) | 7–0 | Anges Bleus de Joinville |
| 1989 | VIII | June 18, 1989 | Stade Jean-Bouin | Castors de Paris (3) | 14–13 | Aix-en-Provence Argonautes |
| 1990 | IX | June 24, 1990 | Stade Jean-Bouin | Aix-en-Provence Argonautes | 34–7 | Castors de Paris |
| 1991 | X | June 16, 1991 | Stade Jean-Bouin | Aix-en-Provence Argonautes (2) | 29–7 | Castors de Paris |
| 1992 | XI | June 13, 1992 | Stade Jean-Bouin | Aix-en-Provence Argonautes (3) | 33–20 | Sphinx du Plessis Robinson |
| 1993 | XII | June 12, 1993 | Stade Robert Bobin | Castors de Paris (4) | 27–19 | Aix-en-Provence Argonautes |
| 1994 | XIII | June 26, 1994 | Stade Robert Bobin | Mousquetaires de Paris | 28–22 | Aix-en-Provence Argonautes |
Casque de Diamant (Diamond helmet)
| 1995 | I | June 25, 1995 | Stade Charléty | Aix-en-Provence Argonautes (4) | 36–16 | Mousquetaires de Paris |
| 1996 | II | June 16, 1996 | Stade Charléty | Mousquetaires de Paris (2) | 23–19 | Aix-en-Provence Argonautes |
| 1997 | III | June 14, 1997 | Stade Charléty | La Courneuve Flash | 45–28 | Aix-en-Provence Argonautes |
| 1998 | IV | June 14, 1998 | Stade Charléty | Aix-en-Provence Argonautes (5) | 28–14 | La Courneuve Flash |
| 1999 | V | June 20, 1999 | Georges-Carcassonne Stadium | Aix-en-Provence Argonautes (6) | 27–20 | Molosses d'Asnières |
| 2000 | VI | June 17, 2000 | Stade René-Gaillard | La Courneuve Flash (2) | 68–35 | Aix-en-Provence Argonautes |
| 2001 | VII | June 23, 2001 | Stade Marville | Aix-en-Provence Argonautes (7) | 30–23 | La Courneuve Flash |
| 2002 | VIII | June 23, 2002 | Georges-Carcassonne Stadium | Aix-en-Provence Argonautes (8) | 23–21 | La Courneuve Flash |
| 2003 | IX | June 1, 2003 | Georges-Carcassonne Stadium | La Courneuve Flash (3) | 28–24 | Aix-en-Provence Argonautes |
| 2004 | X | June 19, 2004 | Stade Marville | Amiens Spartiates | 41–31 | Aix-en-Provence Argonautes |
| 2005 | XI | June 18, 2005 | Stade Marville | La Courneuve Flash (4) | 33–27 | Amiens Spartiates |
| 2006 | XII | June 17, 2006 | Stade Marville | La Courneuve Flash (5) | 48–24 | Aix-en-Provence Argonautes |
| 2007 | XIII | June 16, 2007 | Stade Sébastien Charléty | La Courneuve Flash (6) | 21–6 | Thonon Black Panthers |
| 2008 | XIV | June 28, 2008 | Stade Sébastien Charléty | La Courneuve Flash (7) | 28–22 | Elancourt Templiers |
| 2009 | XV | June 20, 2009 | Parc des Sports Michel Hidalgo | La Courneuve Flash (8) | 41–27 | Thonon Black Panthers |
| 2010 | XVI | June 27, 2010 | Parc des Sports Michel Hidalgo | Amiens Spartiates (2) | 24–21 | La Courneuve Flash |
| 2011 | XVII | June 18, 2011 | Stade Sébastien Charléty | La Courneuve Flash (9) | 45–27 | Centaures de Grenoble |
| 2012 | XVIII | June 23, 2012 | Stade Sébastien Charléty | Amiens Spartiates (3) | 10–7 | Thonon Black Panthers |
| 2013 | XIX | June 22, 2013 | Stade Sébastien Charléty | Thonon Black Panthers | 14–0 | La Courneuve Flash |
| 2014 | XX | June 28, 2014 | Stade Sébastien Charléty | Thonon Black Panthers (2) | 35–34 | Molosses d'Asnières |
| 2015 | XXI | June 20, 2015 | Stade Sébastien Charléty | Cougars de Saint-Ouen-l'Aumône | 28–7 | Thonon Black Panthers |
| 2016 | XXII | June 25, 2016 | Stade Guy Boniface | Cougars de Saint-Ouen-l'Aumône (2) | 28–17 | Dauphins de Nice |
| 2017 | XXIII | June 24, 2017 | Stade Parsemain | La Courneuve Flash (10) | 44–40 | Thonon Black Panthers |
| 2018 | XXIV | June 30, 2018 | Stade Parsemain | La Courneuve Flash (11) | 20–14 | Thonon Black Panthers |
| 2019 | XXV | June 29, 2019 | Stadium Lille Métropole | Thonon Black Panthers (3) | 24–7 | Cougars de Saint-Ouen-l'Aumône |
| 2020 | | July 4, 2020 | Stadium Lille Métropole | Season cancelled after week three due to COVID-19 | | |
| 2021 | Season not played due to COVID-19 | | | | | |
| 2022 | XXVI | July 9, 2022 | Stade Joseph-Moynat | La Courneuve Flash (12) | 16–10 | Thonon Black Panthers |
| 2023 | XXVII | July 1, 2023 | Stade Joseph-Moynat | Thonon Black Panthers (4) | 35–18 | Blue Stars de Marseille |
| 2024 | XXVIII | June 29, 2024 | Stade Gilbert Brutus | Thonon Black Panthers (5) | 37–33 | La Courneuve Flash |
| 2025 | XXIX | June 28, 2025 | Chambéry Savoie Stadium | Thonon Black Panthers (6) | 44–12 | Cannes Iron Mask |
| 2026 | XXX | June 20, 2026 | Stade Auguste-Delaune, Saint-Denis | Thonon Black Panthers (7) | 49–46 | Cannes Iron Mask |

== Media ==
In 2022, the league is set to receive its first regularly scheduled television coverage on Sport en France.
