= Thonon Evian Grand Genève FC =

French football club

Thonon Evian
- Full name: Thonon Evian Grand Genève Football Club
- Nicknames: Les Croix de Savoie (The Savoy Crosses); Evian; Les Roses (The Pinks); L' ETG
- Founded: 1909; 117 years ago (as Club Sportif de Thonon)
- Ground: Stade Joseph-Moynat
- Capacity: 3,600
- Owner: STRIVE Football Group
- Chairman: Ravy Truchot
- Manager: Noël Tosi
- League: National 2
- 2023–24: National 1 – Group A, 10th of 14 (relegated)
- Website: www.grandgenevefootball.com
Home colours	Away colours	Third colours

Thonon Evian Grand Genève Football Club, formerly Evian Thonon Gaillard FC (French pronunciation: [evjɑ̃ tɔnɔ̃ ɡajaʁ]), commonly referred to as Thonon Evian or just Evian, is a French association football club based in Thonon-les-Bains that was founded on 1 July 2007, this incarnation however was founded in 2020. They compete in the Championnat National 3, the fifth tier of the French football league system.

One of Evian's predecessors were known as FC Gaillard and existed from 1924 to 2003. Gaillard's only notable success was winning the Division d'Honneur of the Rhône-Alpes region in 1999. Evian proved more successful, ascending to the professional divisions after just three seasons. The club won the Championnat de France Amateur in 2008, the Championnat National in 2010, and finally the Ligue 2 in 2011.

Evian currently play their home matches at the Stade Joseph-Moynat in Thonon-les-Bains but moved to the Parc des Sports in nearby Annecy from the 2010–11 season to the 2015–16 season as the Joseph-Moynat did not meet the standards of the Ligue de Football Professionnel. The move was a temporary measure while the club contemplated building a new facility or renovating the Stade Joseph-Moynat. Prior to moving to Annecy, Evian sought to play at the Stade de Genève over the Swiss border in nearby Geneva. Until the 2013–14 season, the club's main sponsor was Groupe Danone, owner of the Evian brand of mineral water. Danone's CEO Franck Riboud was honorary president and the man behind the success of the club.

At the end of the 2015–16 season, the club was relegated from Ligue 2, and further demoted by the DNCG to the Championnat de France Amateur, the fourth level of football in France. The club then entered receivership meaning that, even if it had survived, it would have suffered a further administrative relegation should they go into another stage of bankruptcy related to the one from 2014 to 2016 at the end of the 2016–17 season. The club withdrew from the competition on 9 August to avoid financial troubles.

The club reformed in Regional 2, and won back-to-back promotions in 2019 and 2020 to gain a place in Championnat National 3 for the 2020–21 season. In May 2021, it was announced that the club had become a member of the STRIVE football group, with US team FC Miami City and Belgian team Royal FC Mandel United.

== History ==
=== Football in Thonon: Olympique Thonon Chablais ===
Thonon
- Full name: Olympique Thonon Chablais
- Founded: 1909 (as Club Sportif de Thonon)
- Dissolved: 2007 (merged with Football Croix-de-Savoie 74)
- Stadium: Stade Joseph-Moynat
- Capacity: 3,600
- League: Promotion d'Honneur

In 1909, a handful of enthusiasts founded a multi-sport association in Thonon, the Club sportif de Thonon, soon to be devoted entirely to football.

After several dozen seasons in the Regional championships of Lyonnais (the historical equivalent of the Ligue Rhône-Alpes de Football – At the time, the Division d'Honneur was the 4th division of French football) -, the first team was promoted to Division 3 and then to Division 2 the following year, in 1979. Three seasons later, in the 1981-1982 French D2 Football Championship, the club failed to win the Group A title against Toulouse FC on goal difference. Then, little by little, the club slipped down the national and regional league ladders.

It all began with a double financial relegation in 1987, the year in which the downward slide began and the year in which the club changed its name to Olympique Thonon Chablais. The club returned to Division 4, where it remained for 6 seasons until 1992/1993, when it was administratively relegated to the French National 3 Football Championship. That same year, the club merged with another local club, Stella Thonon, the team from the Thonon Portuguese community of lower level (Promotion Honneur Régionale). However it did not remain at this level for long, winning the championship title for Group F at the end of the 1993-94 National 3 season. However, this promotion was followed by several relegations in a row from 1996 to 1997, until they reached the Division d'Honneur (7th in 1998–99) and then the Promotion d'Honneur (8th in 2000–01). The club did regain promotion to the DHR in 2004–05, but was finally relegated at the end of the season.

=== Football in Gaillard: FC Gaillard and FC Ville-le-Grand ===
FC Gaillard
- Full name: Football Club Gaillard
- Founded: 1924; 102 years ago
- Dissolved: 2003; 23 years ago
- Ground: Stade Louis Simon
- Capacity: 3,600
- Chairman: Jo Dupraz
- Manager: Pascal Dupraz
- League: Division d'Honneur

Back in 1924 in Gaillard, a group of friends who had returned from the First World War six years earlier wanted to continue their adventures through sport, and football in particular. Matches were played near the Arve (a river that runs through Haute-Savoie and empties into the Rhône at Geneva), at the Stade des Corbeaux, near a farm where goats and horses were reared, their droppings attracting swarms of birds (hence the name of the plain on the outskirts of the town). The first president was Édouard Bozio, who also played for the club, before François Croset took over as president, player-coach and captain, alongside another club icon, Auguste Paterlini, known as Kiki. At the time, the club's headquarters were at Monsieur Grognux's, who ran a café outside the church. The establishment also served as changing rooms where the players changed before cycling to the stadium. The club took part in various departmental championships, flying the colours of what were then known as 'les Maraîchers'. In 1940, while the team was playing in the 'Promotion de District', war broke out and Haute-Savoie was occupied by Germany (Second World War), forcing the club to temporarily suspend its activities. However, once peace was restored, football was resumed in Gaillard in 1946 under the leadership of Robert Bartschi. On 2 August 1948, a team entered the then 'Deuxième Série Départementale', and by 1950 had returned to the 'Promotion de District'. In 1957, the team, led by club legend Roland Détruche, entered the 'Promotion de Ligue' (second regional division, the antechamber to the Division d'Honneur), but was instantly demoted to the 'Promotion de District', where it remained for three seasons, before finally returning to the 'Première Série de District' in 1961, having finished the season in thirteenth place. The 1960s saw the team move up to League level and the start of the club's structuring, with yellow and black becoming the club's symbolic colours. The Gaillard team won the 'First District Division' championship in 1963, then finished runners-up in the 'Promotion District' the year they were promoted to the top flight. However, the League Promotion campaign proved too tough for the team, which finished eighth and was relegated by one point at the end of the 1964–1965 season. However, the team did not shy away from the upward mobility that showed their ambition and determination, bouncing back the year they were relegated (finishing second in the Promotion de District behind US La Roche-sur-Foron) and temporarily settling into the Promotion de Ligue, where they played from 1967 to 1970. From 1970 to 1982, after two consecutive relegations, the team played in the District championships, stagnating in the First Division between holding on (ninth in 1978) and missing out on promotion (second in 1976 and 1980). Until 1975, the club continued to play at the Stade des Corbeaux, then moved to the new Stade Louis Simon, gradually moving up towards the centre of the commune of Gaillard, which subsequently developed close to this area. The club's headquarters are now located in the Lambrigger brewery, and it now has 120 members, divided into eight teams: undergraduates, pupils, minimes, cadets, juniors and three senior teams. The first team included Salvatore Mazzeo, future club director and local councillor. In 1985, the Yellow and Blacks moved up to the 'Promotion Honneur Régional' of the Rhône-Alpes Football League (equivalent to the former 'Promotion de Ligue', the region's 3rd division). At the end of this first season in the PHR, the club held its own and even finished in second place. However, it was not until the 1989–1990 season that they moved up to the Division d'Honneur Régional (finishing as champions of Poule B two points ahead of CA Saint-Jean-de-Maurienne. After a year in the DHR, the directors, Maryan Baquerot and Salvatore Mazzeo, in consultation with coach Jacques Veggia begin the necessary structuring of the club.

=== Pascal Dupraz Era ===
In 1991, Pascal Dupraz was already thinking about his professional retraining and was still attracting interest from a number of second division clubs, notably SC Bastia, who then offered him a contract that he considered interesting. But when Baquerot offered him the chance to return to his native region to help the first team of his local club, he had no hesitation in accepting, especially as Baquerot, who was also director of human resources at Palais des Nations guaranteed him a salaried position at the United Nations Office in Geneva, initially in charge of maintenance, he would eventually become head of the logistics department of the United Nations High Commissioner for Refugees. Dupraz concedes that he made a few sacrifices when he decided to sign up with Gaillard, tipping over the edge into amateurism, with upright, may not be professional, who give their all on the pitch but nothing more. However, he had no regrets about this choice, made official on 1 July 1991, and considered by club historians to be a major one: both for the club and for his own professional and personal life. The results would prove it very quickly. Indeed, as early as 1993, the team, including future club director Maurice Payot, was promoted to Division d'Honneur, the highest regional level, following a play-off match (for Group B) at the Stade Municipal de Chambéry against the reserves of Grenoble Norcap. As for the Coupe de France, in February of the same year, the team only lost in the eight round of the competition, in extra time of a match lost three goals to nil to FC Martigues, marked by the injury of the leader Dupraz to the Achilles tendon.

In 2003, Pascal Dupraz wanted to turn the club around, fearing that it would fall into decline for non-sporting reasons, particularly financial ones. In fact, he declared that despite the efforts made by everyone at Gaillard to take the club as far as possible (such as the moral and financial encouragement from the municipality via the mayor, Renée Magnin), the club would not succeed without outside help. However, at the time, the two clubs from the Annemasse suburbs were not on good terms and even refused to allow any friendly matches to be organised between them, from the youth teams through to the seniors. Pascal Dupraz then contacted the vice-president of FC Ville-la-Grand, Paul Perelli, explaining to him his fear that the two clubs would die on their own if there were no rapprochement. Relations between the two clubs gradually began to ease and, after seven attempts at a meeting, Manuel Augusto (president of FC Ville-la-Grand) and Maurice Payot (president of FC Gaillard) finally got together. Five months of discussions later (a weekly meeting attended by eight administrators from each club), in May, the Gaillard and Ville-la-Grand clubs agreed to merge to form Football Croix-de-Savoie 74, effective in the Summer. Jo Dupraz, who was involved in the merger with Bernard Zanetti (on the Gaillard side), stated that it was imperative to have synergy with another club in the region to obtain additional sports facilities as well as additional financial support. With the support of the mayors of the two towns, the presidents of the two clubs – Maurice Payot for FC Gaillard and Manuel Augusto for FC Ville-le-Grand – became co-presidents of the newly created club, with Pascal Dupraz, who had coached FC Gaillard since 1991, taking over as coach. This administrative merger, considered crucial by the club's historians, was celebrated on 19 May at the Casino in Annemasse in the presence of the various local players.

=== Football in Gaillard: Croix de Savoie 74 ===
FC Croix de Savoie
- The badge of Football Croix-de-Savoie 74, the original club
- Full name: Football Croix de Savoie 74
- Nicknames: Les Croix de Savoie (The Savoy Crosses); Les Roses (The Roses)
- Founded: 2003; 23 years ago
- Dissolved: 2007; 19 years ago
- Ground: Stade Louis Simon
- Capacity: 3,600
- Owner: Danone (de facto owner as financial supporter)
- Chairman: Franck Riboud
- Manager: Laurent Croci
- League: Championnat de France Amateur
- 2006-07: 2nd
Home colours	Away colours

In the Summer of 2003, Football Croix-de-Savoie 74 was formed as a result of a merger between FC Gaillard and FC Ville-la-Grand. The new club finished 3rd in the Championnat de France amateur (CFA) Groupe B section for the 2003–04 season with ninety points, fifteen wins, eleven draws and eight defeats. Normally, only the top club in each of the four amateur groups are promoted to the Championnat National; however, both the 1st and 2nd placed clubs in the group were reserve sides of professional teams, namely Lyon and Metz. As such, Croix-de-Savoie was promoted to nationwide football for the first time in their history. Those responsible for the success of the Croix-de-Savoie's very first season included Serbian attacking midfielder Dejan Belic (ten goals) and Franck Chow Yuen (six goals), another midfield player, striker Fred Chevaline (seven goals) accompanied by the Burundi international Félicien M'Banza (three goals) and iconic defenders Frédéric Bassinat, Jérôme Adam and Damien Tumbach. The Savoyards also had a remarkable run in the Coupe de France, losing only in the last sixteen to Stade Rennais, after winning the last 32 on penalties away to AS Poissy. The club's first season in National saw them narrowly avoid relegation, finishing 14th out of 20, two points above relegated 17th place Besançon, which for many, was not bad for a 2 years old team. The 2005–06 season was less successful; Croix-de-Savoie finished 18th with 41 points, one point behind SO Châtellerault, thus falling back to the fourth division. Croix-de-Savoie's average attendance also dropped from 933 to 716. In the off-season, FCS74's fortunes were still fragile, and the Direction Nationale du Contrôle de Gestion threatened the club with double relegation to CFA 2. The decision was postponed on appeal and the Savoyard management finally won their case. After being relegated for a goal a few weeks earlier, Pascal Dupraz asked for a break. He became sporting director and Laurent Croci took over at the helm of a squad that had been depleted at the mercato. Indeed, relegation to the CFA, followed by the spectre of a possible fall to CFA 2, or even bankruptcy, prompted the departure of around fifteen players, including some of the architects of past successes, particularly in defence.

=== The Danone takeover ===
In 2006, with the club nearing bankruptcy, they were bought by Danone, a French multinational corporation known for food and beverage products such as Volvic (Mineral water), Danette, Alpro, Activia, Actimel, Nutricia, Bledina and even Evian. Danone wouldn't become owners but a main partner for the club. They will help the club with financing but also help the team structure themselves. The man behind this is CEO of Danone, Franck Riboud. Evian bottles are made in an Evian-les-Bains factory, about 40 kilometers away from their stadium. The three attackers also left, Valerian Peslier joined FC Sète, Frédéric Chevalme joined Rumilly and William Da Silva Guimaraes returned to his native Brazil as did Cardoso Moreira.

Recruitment must therefore be effective. Will be retained in particular Junior Moukoko, from the Berrichonne de Châteauroux and Aboubacar Sylla, FC Gueugnon). In the words of the then sports director, Pascal Dupraz, the integration of all these new players was much faster than the staff had hoped.

The team is constantly on the rise but is struggling to win at home. Despite this, Croix de Savoie still play the climb until the penultimate day, thus calling into question the supremacy of Gap FC and AS Saint-Priest. This new championship is much more physical and less technical than the National and players must adapt to it, like midfielder Pierre-Emmanuel Dupraz, local player trained at FC Gaillard (and son of Pascal Dupraz), or defender Innocent Hamga, Cameroonian international. In addition, the Croix-de-Savoie suffer from the muscular play of the eleven teams of the group based in the South of France. Yanis Cavaglia's regularity (30 games, 2 yellow cards) and Raphaël Camacho's defensive strength (24 games, 3 goals) are all important elements of the season, as is the presence in the squad of midfielder Stéphane Potier. In front, the Croix de Savoie made good performances overall, with the Guinean International Football Team Aboubacar Sylla and the Congolese Junior Moukoko, top scorer with 25 games, 10 goals and 4 assists.

However, like the draw conceded in December 2006 against AS Fréjus-Saint-Raphaël (0-0), the team "lacks concentration". A 1-1 draw against the reserve of the AS Saint-Étienne during the 30th day leaves them too far from the Athletic Club arlésien which promotes itself in the National with 96 points, despite the defeat of the southern team against its Savoyard runner-up in Moynat The Croix de Savoie finally finished second in Group B, and the players, including historic goalkeeper Johann Durand, keep this season's bitter taste of unfinished. At home, the year ends with a 3-1 victory against the Montpellier HSC reserve on the 33rd day.

=== Foundation ===
Croix de Savoie 74
- Full name: Olympique Croix de Savoie 74
- Nicknames: Les Croix de Savoie (The Savoy Crosses); Les Roses (The Roses)
- Founded: 2007; 19 years ago
- Dissolved: 2009; 17 years ago
- Ground: Stade Joseph-Moynat
- Capacity: 3,600
- Owner: Danone (de facto owner as financial supporter)
- Chairman: Franck Riboud
- League: Championnat National
- 2008-09: Championnat National, 5th
Home colours	Away colours

In 2007, a merger between Croix-de-Savoie 74 and Olympique Thonon Chablais created Olympique Croix-de-Savoie 74. Whilst the former club had been heavily associated with the commune of Gaillard, the new club moved to the nearby commune of Thonon-les-Bains because in August 2005, the stadium in Gaillard was deemed unfit for use in National 2. The decision resulted in the club being forced to move to Stade Joseph-Moynat in Thonon, a facility with 2,700 seats and a total capacity of 6,000. During the 2007–2008 season, the club played in the Championnat de France Amateurs (CFA) and Pascal Dupraz took over as coach, assisted by Laurent Croci (the roles were officially reversed). In his own words, Pascal Dupraz had been asked 'at the highest level to take over the team'. The season got off to a mediocre start, and the new club's beginnings were marred by internal clashes between the people of Gaillard and the people of Thonon-Les-Bains. Later, however, the squad, boosted by the arrival of midfielders Pierre Bouby and Mathieu Lafon (who would stay with the club for a long time), enjoyed a very good season and won the title ahead of Besançon Racing Club, against whom the Croix had been fighting all season. The top-of-the-table match on the 31st matchday (out of 34) ended in a goalless draw between the two teams, but the Savoyard side's victory over Jura Sud Foot just as RCB were to lose at Vesoul HSF the following week opened the door to the National. In addition to the biggest win in the club's history (6–0) against US Raon-l'Étape on 8 September 2007, and victories over professional reserves (including a 1–0 home win over AJ Auxerre), the year was marked by a run of fifteen games without defeat, with strikers Samuel Ojong and Yohann di Tommaso leading the way. Their run in the 2007–08 Coupe de France had ended in the Round of 16, eliminated by the 'great Lyon’ of Sidney Govou and Fred by a score of one goal to nil (the latter's goal in the 80th minute); this was the young club's best performance in the competition. The league title was officially clinched on the penultimate matchday on 17 May 2008, following a 2–0 home win over Red Star FC (goals from Christophe Meirsman and Guillaume Coelho). Olympique Croix de Savoie had an exceptional record of 108 points, 22 wins, 8 draws, 4 defeats, and above all 52 goals scored and only 17 conceded. The club returned to the Championnat National as the CFA Group B winners (with a record 108 points) for the 2008–09 season.

The club's promotion to the National in the 2008-09 season however, saw them make a difficult start to the season before putting in an excellent performance at the end. The team finished in 5th, thanks in particular to the mid-season recruitment of striker Nicolas Goussé, who scored a hat-trick in his first match. In the Coupe de France, OCS 74 lost in the round of 16 on penalties to Stade Brestois (2-2 at the end of normal time and 5-4 at the end of the shoot-out). This year also saw the club restructure. They welcomed Patrick Trotignon as their new president in October 2008 and became a SASP a few weeks later. The shareholding is now divided between a group of former club directors, who hold a total of 10% (including Pascal and Jo Dupraz, former Thonon directors Jean-Louis Escoffier and Pierre Fillon, and former directors of Football Croix de Savoie 74 Babacar Macalou and Henri Vulliez), and the holding company "Haute-Savoie Football Développment" was created for the occasion. Haute-Savoie entrepreneur Richard Tumbach is the chairman and 16% shareholder, while Swiss-Iranian businessman Esfandiar Bakhtiar is the majority shareholder, owning 42% of the club. The increase in the club's capital has also enabled a number of high-profile shareholders to become shareholders. Because of Danone, the wealthy owners and the wealthy chairman, Croix de Savoie were no longer a club struggling financially, but are now a club that is very rich for Championnat National standards. And yes, Danone will make sure that locals know that the club is alive and well, thanks to Danone.

=== Rise ===
Evian Thonon Gaillard
- The badge of Evian Thonon Gaillard, 2009–16
- Full name: Evian Thonon Gaillard Football Club Croix de Savoie
- Nicknames: Les Croix de Savoie (The Savoy Crosses); Les Roses (The Roses); The Pinks
- Founded: 2009; 17 years ago
- Dissolved: 2016; 10 years ago
- Ground: Stade Joseph-Moynat (Parc des Sports (Annecy) for Ligue 1 & Ligue 2 matches)
- Capacity: 3,600 for Stade Joseph Moynat
- Owners: Haute-Savoie Football Développment
- Chairmen: Patrick Trotignon (until 2013); Franck Riboud (until 2014) (Honorary president) (via Danone)
- Manager: Romain Revelli
- League: Ligue 2
- 2015–16: Ligue 2, 18th (relegated)
Home colours	Away colours	Third colours

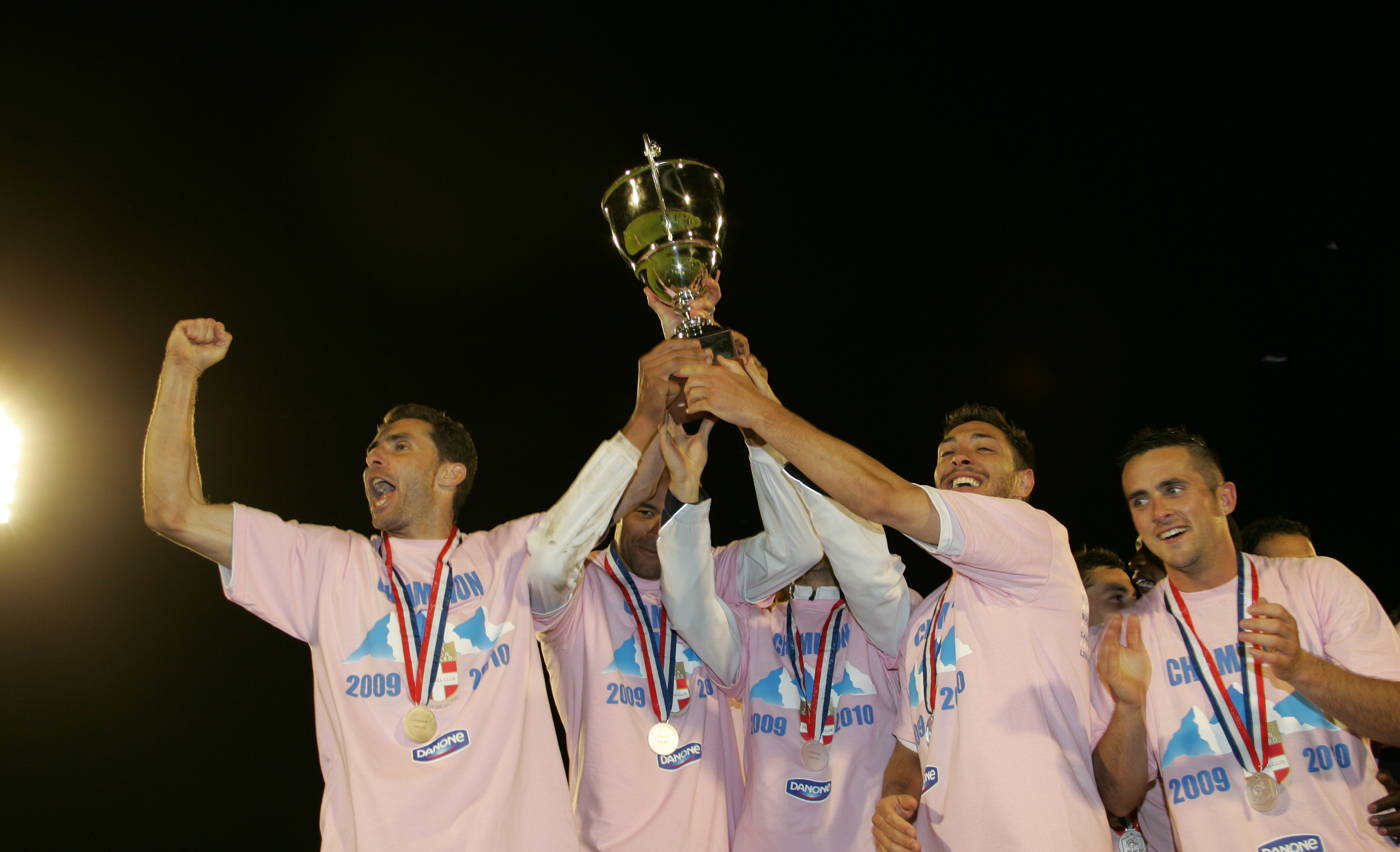
Trophy as champions of National 2009-2010

In the summer of 2009, the president of the Groupe Danone, Franck Riboud, was made honorary president of the football club. Riboud yet again changed the name of the team to Evian Thonon Gaillard Football Club. He also put money into the team to improve the youth system of the club and harboured aspirations of the side achieving promotion to Ligue 2. In doing so, he changed the kits from blue to pink, which is the main colour of Evian. One of their kits though, has a mountain featured 89 times, resembling the Alpes. Having recovered from its financial and sporting problems prior to the merger, the fledgling club set its sights high. Pascal Dupraz became sporting director and Stéphane Paille took over as coach. A major recruitment drive saw the arrival of goalkeeper Bertrand Laquait and midfielder Cédric Barbosa. The team made an excellent start to the season, but as winter approached, a number of poor performances, notably against Paris FC (3–1), led to the dismissal of coach Stéphane Paille, when the club announced on its official website that 'the deterioration in results over the last eight matches and differences of opinion led to this decision'. The dismissal was seen as unfair by Paille, who said he was 'stunned' and 'disgusted', with the club still second in the overall standings. Although he was still supported by his assistant at the time, Patrick Aussems, the accusations against him were reinforced by Christian Payan. Indeed, the then players' agent spoke of a certain amount of harassment that the former coach allegedly exercised over a number of players, particularly goalkeeper Amaury Borel. During the period of reflection regarding Paille's replacement, Pascal Dupraz acted as interim coach, notably in the 2009–10 Coupe de France Last 16 game at the Parc des Princes against Paris Saint-Germain (3–1 defeat). Bernard Casoni was finally chosen by the club's directors. Under the Corsican coach, the team resumed its progress and enjoyed a good second half of the season. On 16 April 2010, the club completed the feat in Riboud's first season presiding over the club achieving promotion to Ligue 2, for the first time in 23 years, following its 1–0 victory over Amiens. In doing so, they followed in the footsteps of CS Thonon, now part of ETGFC, who had played at this level before.

After earning promotion to Ligue 2 for the 2010–11 season, Evian was rumoured to be pursuing a move to play its home matches at the Stade de la Praille in Geneva, Switzerland after it was determined that the club's current facility, the Stade Joseph-Moynat, did not meet the Ligue de Football Professionnel's (LFP) standards. Thonon-les-Bains, the commune where the club situates itself, is a few kilometres from the Swiss border and is only 34.6 kilometres (21.5 mi), a 45-minute car drive, from the city of Geneva. It was reported that the club's president, Patrick Trotignon, had been advocating the move since the beginning of the 2009–10 Championnat National season just in case the club achieved promotion to the second division. The vice-president of Swiss club Servette FC, the regular occupant of the stadium, questioned the move citing possible schedule conflicts, as well as the health of the pitch if both clubs were to use the stadium on a weekly basis. However, Benoît Genecand, president of Fondation du Stade de Genève (FSG), which owned and operated the facility, disputed the claims of the Servette official. Servette responded immediately to Genecand's comments via a press release posted on the club's official website. Evian petitioned to the State Council of Geneva and obtained approval from the LFP for the move in early May. On 20 May 2010, Evian received a favourable ruling from the French Football Federation (FFF) with the Federal Council voting in favour of the move. According to the federation, the move now had to be agreed upon by a UEFA executive committee. On 8 June, UEFA officially denied Evian's request to play at the Stade de la Praille meaning the club would play its home matches at the Parc des Sports in nearby Annecy. Not to mention, the club represents Ville-la-Grand, Gaillard, Thonon-les-Bains, Evian-les-Bains and Publier. The situation was notably bizarre by many.

The promoted team made a spectacular start, taking first place in the standings from the first to the sixth day with four wins, one defeat and one draw. This good run ended with a heavy defeat away to Dijon FCO, five goals to one. They had already been eliminated from the 2010-11 Coupe de la Ligue by En Avant de Guingamp. Despite this setback, the team continued its fine run, even though a period of seven matches with six draws in October-November distanced it somewhat from the top of the standings (between fifth and fourth place). The Croix de Savoie would return to victory on the fifteenth day against Le Mans, thus entering a new period of five-match victories, including the seventh and eighth rounds of the 2010-11 Coupe de France. The team would then come up against its two promoted colleagues (ESTAC Troyes and Stade de Reims) met in quick succession with a draw and a defeat respectively. On 9 January 2011, Evian recorded an upset victory over the defending French champions Olympique de Marseille in the Coupe de France, defeating the Ligue 1 club 3–1 in the Round of 64. Strong form throughout the season saw Evian secure a second successive promotion as champions of Ligue 2.

After a remarkable transfer window with the arrival of Jérôme Leroy, Christian Poulsen and Sidney Govou, ETG's first season in the elite is considered by all observers and by the club itself as a success. Certainly, the start of the season is difficult with a total of only 5 victories for a first half of the season marked in particular by a series of 9 matches without any victory. But certain signs remain promising in the eyes of observers. Thus during these first five months, the club was able to achieve an excellent series of home matches which ended in climax with a crushing victory against the future champion of France, Montpellier HSC (4-2). In the same way, as the matches progressed, the club's ambitions in terms of game construction (mainly in the areas of ball recovery and attack) were noticed and paid off for the staff, as evidenced by the draws obtained against Paris Saint-Germain (2-2 after ETG led 2-0) and Lille OSC (1-1). Finishing in an honorable eleventh place at mid-season, the club decided to replace coach Bernard Casoni, already certain to leave in June. The separation was made by mutual agreement, and was explained by disagreements between the directors and the Corsican of origin, twice consecutive champion with the club. It only became effective and official on January 1, when Pablo Correa, without a club for more than 6 months, decided to commit to Chablais . This winter break was also marked by the arrival of Thomas Kahlenberg, the fourth Dane at "L’ETG" who, in this second half of the season, were going to increase the good impression they already made on the supporters, the staff, the directors and the media, by playing a big role in the team's privileged playing sectors. Even if the beginnings of the Uruguayan at the helm of the squad were not very prolific (with victories only in the Coupe de France against teams from lower divisions), the team recovered quickly and a draw in SMC Caen (2-2 with Govou equalizing in the 93rd minute) marked the beginning of a new era. According to the staff, this match was the trigger for a positive dynamic that the match against AS Saint-Étienne would confirm, as would the victory with a double from Kévin Bérigaud against Nancy Lorraine, former emblematic club of the new coach Corréa. The club therefore secured its survival quite early, at the end of the 32nd minute day (0-3 victory against Valenciennes FC). At the end of the season, the club was in a very good position in the ranking, in the top 10, standing out for example from the other promoted teams (AC Ajaccio and Dijon FCO) who are still fighting not to be relegated. During the end of the season, it will also have upset the races for the title and the Europa League by drawing against Montpellier HSC (2-2) but also by beating clubs like Olympique de Marseille (2-0) or Toulouse FC (2-1). Les Roses finished in a respectable ninth place, one place above French giants Marseille. Unlike their first year in the elite of French football, the 2012-2013 season was much more difficult for the Haute-Savoyards. Indeed, the team had a very lackluster start to the season in terms of results, despite a quality and playing principles deemed interesting by the press and in continuity with the 2011-2012 season. Following a series of three defeats and a draw, or four matches without victories, in addition to a disastrous friendly campaign of six matches without victories for five defeats and a draw, the Franco-Uruguayan coach Pablo Correa (coach originally, with Bernard Casoni whom he replaced on January 1, of the first maintenance of the ETG in Ligue 1) was dismissed. He was replaced by the club's historic coach, Pascal Dupraz, then sporting director since 2009. The team won its first match on September 15 against SC Bastia at home and with a score of three goals to zero. However, the team will subsequently have a roller-coaster ride. ETG is in fact experiencing a series of three games without a win, which Tunisian striker Saber Khlifa will end by scoring a hat-trick on the pitch of the reigning French champion Montpellier HSC on October 6 (3-2 victory). Then follows a new series of three defeats, two of which were at home and notably a heavy disappointment, four to zero against Toulouse FC. In reaction to this bad period, Dupraz, made some tactical changes, notably in the team compositions (like the return of Bertrand Laquait in goal at the expense of Stephan Andersen). Thus, during this month of November-early December, the team put in a series of good performances, particularly against rivals for relegation (such as Stade de Reims, AS Nancy-Lorraine, or ES Troyes AC) with five matches without defeat (two draws, three wins), if people exclude a heavy defeat (4-0) at the Parc des Princes against the future French champion Paris Saint-Germain. The team, however, finished the month of December in freewheeling mode with two consecutive away defeats. At the mid-season, the club was in 17th place, 3 points behind the first relegation spot, FC Sochaux-Montbéliard. The second half of the season starts poorly with a series of eight matches without a win (including five draws), but the team can cling to its good run in the Coupe de France, a competition in which it won all three of its matches (against lower-level teams). On March 9, ETG hosted FC Sochaux, a direct competitor for relegation. Putting an end to this disastrous series, the team won decisively with a score of five to one. The situation does not improve immediately, despite victories against Lille OSC and a draw against Stade de Reims, the team stumbles against AS Saint-Étienne. In the Coupe de France, they draw a tough match and play their quarter-final against the future French champion Paris Saint-Germain. Following a mediocre performance by the Parisian internationals, which the team was able to take advantage of, they equalised one goal each after being led, and then maintained this score until the end of extra time. The penalty shootout is also completely missed by PSG, who either hit the crossbar or Bertrand Laquait, allowing ETG to create a surprise by qualifying for the semi-finals. Away from home, ETG will lose two matches against two direct competitors (Nancy and Troyes), and will be defeated at home by PSG, ten days after beating them in the Cup. But it is still at home that the team will finally shine, stringing together excellent performances. The "Croix de Savoie" will win decisively against FC Lorient (4-0) in the semi-final, and then will impose the same score against OGC Nice, thanks in particular to a goal by Sabre Khalifa, which will be named goal of the year at the Trophées UNFP du football 2013 because it was shot from 64 meters away from the opponent's goal. The team managed to stay up on the penultimate day (and the last home match of the season) against Valenciennes and finished in 16th place. Evian also reached the Coupe de France final for the first time in the club's history, where they were beaten 3–2 by Bordeaux, falling victim to a last-minute winner by Cheick Diabaté. "Coupe de France final: Bordeaux beat Evian, Diabate scores twice". BBC. 31 May 2013.

=== Relegation and dissolution ===
Trouble began during the 2013–14 Ligue 1 season, when Esfandiar Bakhtiar-- a local entrepreneur who owned a 16% stake in the club-- arranged to have club president Patrick Trotignon relieved of his duties due to interpersonal disputes between the two men. This angered Riboud, a close friend of Trotignon. As a result, Riboud decided to withdraw from his personal role in the club after the 2013–14 Ligue 1 season ended, and to end his company Danone's sponsorship of the club.

As a result, Evian began its 4th season in Ligue 1 without sponsors. The club was later able to secure sponsorship from MSC Cruises and Bontaz Centre, but they were unable to fully make up the financial gap. Additionally, several of Riboud's friends had also owned smaller stakes in the club; many of them decided to sell their stakes in solidarity with Riboud and Trotignon, further worsening the club's financial situation.

As the club's finances worsened, so did its players' performance. At the end of the 2014–15 Ligue 1 season, Evian was relegated for the first time since 2006. The next year, after the 2015–16 Ligue 2 season, the club was relegated again to the 2016–17 Championnat National.

By this point, the club's financial situation had become so dire that they could not afford to compete in the league. As a result, the DNCG imposed an additional relegation for the subsequent season, which would place Evian in the fourth tier of the French football pyramid, the 2016–17 Championnat de France Amateur (2016-17 CFA). On 2 August 2016, the club was placed in receivership. Evian was given a probationary period of two months to save themselves. Had they successfully done so, they would have suffered a further administrative relegation. However, the club was unable to resolve their financial difficulties before the deadline.

On 9 August, the French Football Federation confirmed Evian's decision to cease operation in the CFA. The club shuttered shortly afterwards.

=== Revival ===
==== Thonon Evian Savoie ====
Thonon Evian Savoie
- The badge of Thonon Evian Savoie, 2017-18
- Full name: Thonon Evian Savoie Football Club
- Nicknames: Les Croix de Savoie (The Savoy Crosses); Les Roses (The Roses); The Pinks
- Founded: 2017; 9 years ago
- Dissolved: 2018; 8 years ago
- Ground: Stade Joseph-Moynat
- Capacity: 3,600
- Manager: Régis Beunardeau
- League: Regional 2
Home colours	Away colours

On 7 December 2016, Evian was renamed Thonon Evian Savoie Football Club, representing Haute-Savoie and not just Thonon-les-Bains and Evian-les-Bains. The change was acclaimed by fans from the region as they could watch their games next season. They made a fresh start and restarted from Regional 2. They now have returned to their stadium from 2007 to 2010 and share it with a PSG academy.

==== Thonon Evian FC ====
Thonon Evian FC
- The badge of Thonon Evian Football Club, 2018-20
- Full name: Thonon Evian Football Club
- Nicknames: Les Croix de Savoie (The Savoy Crosses); Les Roses (The Roses); The Pinks
- Founded: 2018; 8 years ago
- Dissolved: 2020; 6 years ago
- Ground: Stade Joseph-Moynat
- Capacity: 3,600
- Manager: Éric Guichard
- League: Regional 1
Home colours	Away colours

In 2018, Thonon Evian Savoie FC and Union Sportive Evian Lugrin FC merged to form Thonon Evian FC. Both clubs ceased to exist and Thonon Evian took the spot of both teams in Regional 2, staying there for 2018–19.

In 2019, the new club won promotion from the Régional 2 to the Régional 1 of the Auvergne-Rhône-Alpes league. This was followed in 2020 by promotion to Championnat National 3. In June however, the club was renamed (see below).

==== Thonon Evian Grand Geneve ====
In 2020, Thonon Evian FC became Thonon Evian Grand Genève. They expanded their fanbase toward Switzerland for the first time since their failed attempt back from 2010 to 2011. Due to their long name, people mocked them by calling them "Thonon Evian Grand Genève Et Globalement Toutes Les Villes Aux Alentours: Neuchâtel, Chambéry, Un Peu Les Villes De L’Ain Genre Trevoux". They clinched promotion to the Championnat National 2 in 2022. They are known by people who have watched Footballer-YouTuber Val Lienard, who played for them in 2023–24. In 2024, the club was relegated to the Championnat National 3.

== Honours ==
=== Domestic ===
==== League ====
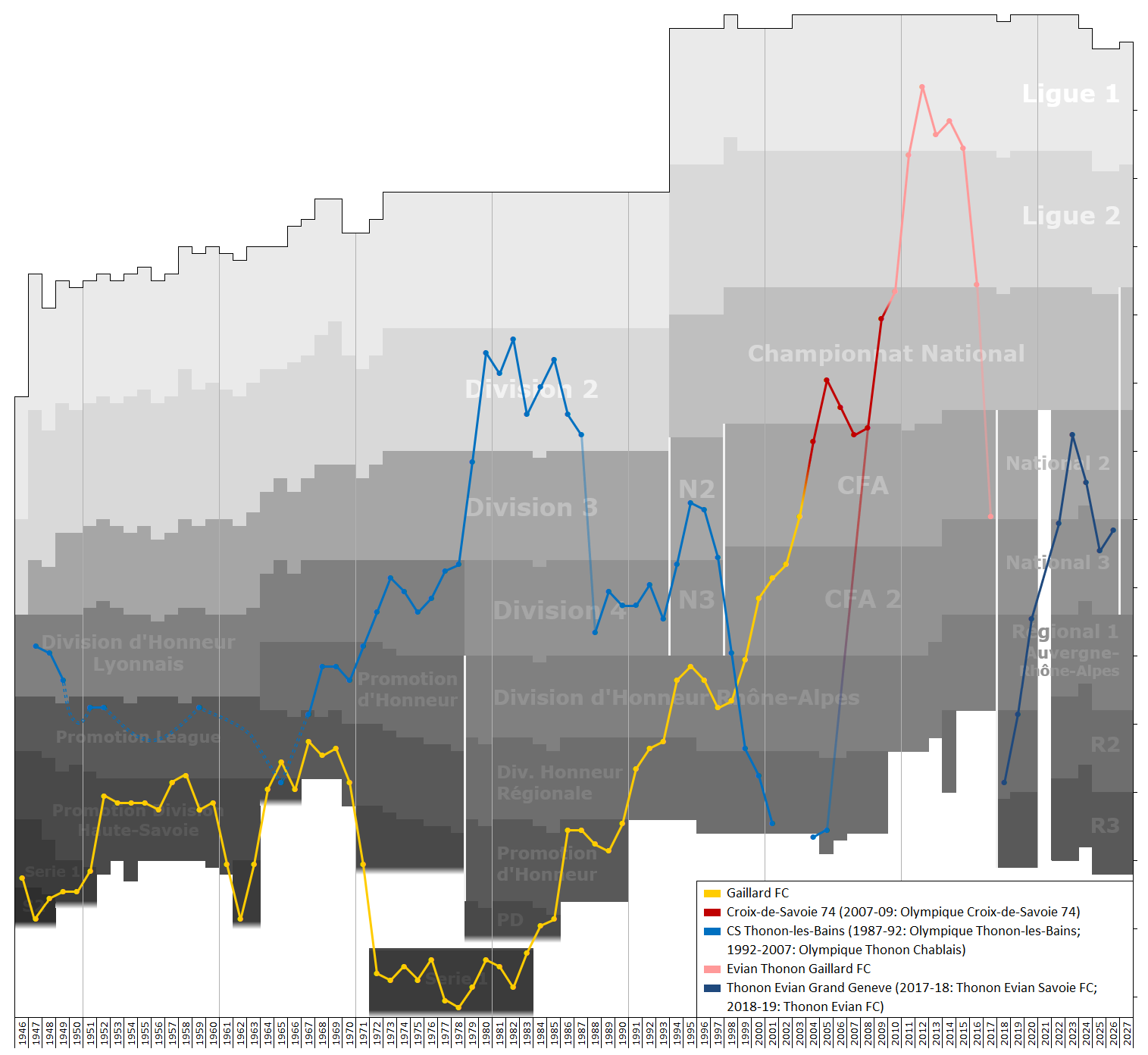
Historical league performance chart of Thonon Evian and its predecessors

- Ligue 2:
  - Winners (1): 2010–11
- Championnat National:
  - Winners (1): 2009–10
- Championnat de France Amateur:
  - Winners (1): 2007–08
- Championnat National 3:
  - Winners (1): 2021–22
- Régional 1 Auvergne-Rhône-Alpes:
  - Winners (1): 2019–20
- Régional 2 Auvergne-Rhône-Alpes:
  - Winners (1): 2018–19

==== Cups ====
- Coupe de France:
  - Runners-up (1): 2012–13

== Players ==
=== First team squad ===
As of 16 January 2025. Note: Flags indicate national team as defined under FIFA eligibility rules; some limited exceptions apply. Players may hold more than one non-FIFA nationality.

No.	Pos.	Nation	Player
16	GK	FRA	Killian Le Roy
30	GK	MAD	Melvin Adrien
16	GK	SEN	Mody Ba
-	DF	FRA	Amary Coproh
12	DF	FRA	Kévin Afougou
24	DF	FRA	Cyriaque Louvion
-	DF	SEN	Amadou Aidara
-	DF	FRA	Achille Truchot
-	DF	FRA	Jafar Demdoum
3	DF	FRA	Olivier Lesueur
18	DF	COD	Emmanuel Kasong Yav
-	MF	FRA	Diaguely Dabo

No.	Pos.	Nation	Player
-	MF	CGO	Alexandre Obambot
-	MF	FRA	Mohamed Maouche
29	MF	FRA	Yoann Martelat
10	MF	FRA	Johan Branger
7	FW	FRA	Yanis Ammour
-	FW	FRA	Franck Betra
-	FW	MLI	Amadou Coulibaly
-	FW	FRA	Wilfried Misiak
-	FW	FRA	Maguette Samb
-	FW	FRA	Mody Doucouré
-	FW	SEN	Mandiaye Sene

== Managerial history ==
Dates	Name
1 July 2007 – 30 June 2009	(France) Pascal Dupraz
5 June 2009 – 18 January 2010	(France) Stéphane Paille
20 January 2010 – 1 January 2012	(France) Bernard Casoni
2 January 2012 – 3 September 2012	(Uruguay) Pablo Correa
3 September 2012 – 30 June 2015	(France) Pascal Dupraz
12 July 2015 – 11 January 2016	(Bosnia and Herzegovina) Safet Sušić
11 January 2016 – 30 June 2016	(France) Romain Revelli
31 July 2017 – 30 June 2018	(France) Régis Beunardeau
1 July 2018 – 29 June 2019	(France) Bryan Bergougnoux
1 July 2019 – 15 September 2020	(France) Éric Guichard
6 October 2020 – 6 May 2021	(Portugal) Hélder Esteves
6 May 2021 – 30 June 2024	(France) Bryan Bergougnoux
1 July 2024 – 11 December 2024	(France) William Prunier
2 January 2025 – present	(France) Noël Tosi
