= Aden Durde =

British gridiron football player and coach (born 1979)

Seattle Seahawks
- Title: Defensive coordinator

Personal information
- Born: 10 July 1979 (age 47); London, England
- Listed height: 6 ft 1 in (1.85 m)
- Listed weight: 240 lb (109 kg)

Career information
- Position: Linebacker
- College: North Iowa Area Community College

Career history

Playing
- London Olympians; Scottish Claymores (2003–2004); Carolina Panthers (2005)*; Hamburg Sea Devils (2005–2007); Kansas City Chiefs (2008)*; La Courneuve Flash
- * Offseason or practice squad member only

Coaching
- London Warriors (2011–2016) Defensive coordinator; Dallas Cowboys (2014–2015) Coaching intern; Atlanta Falcons (2016, 2018–2020); Bill Walsh NFL diversity coaching fellow (2016); Defensive quality control coach (2018–2019); Outside linebackers coach (2020); Dallas Cowboys (2021–2023) Defensive line coach; Seattle Seahawks (2024–present) Defensive coordinator

Awards and highlights
- Super Bowl champion (LX)
- Coaching profile at Pro Football Reference

Aden Durde (DUR-dee; born 10 July 1979) is a British American football coach and former linebacker who is the defensive coordinator for the Seattle Seahawks of the National Football League (NFL). He previously served as the defensive line coach for the Dallas Cowboys from 2021 to 2023.

Durde played as linebacker for the Carolina Panthers and Kansas City Chiefs of the National Football League (NFL) and the Scottish Claymores and Hamburg Sea Devils of NFL Europe. Durde is also known for being an integral part of the International Player Pathway program.

== Playing career ==
Born in London, England, Durde began his football career in the United Kingdom with the London Olympians, a British American Football League team. He also played for a successful Hayes Braves team, based in Hayes, London, as a teenager. Durde attended North Iowa Area Community College in Mason City, Iowa where he played linebacker.

=== Scottish Claymores ===
Durde played for the Scottish Claymores from 2003 until 2004 when team operations were permanently suspended by NFL Europe due to low attendance numbers and an increased league focus on Germany.

=== Hamburg Sea Devils (first stint) ===
In 2005 Durde joined the Hamburg Sea Devils of NFL Europe, for their inaugural season, playing as a middle linebacker.

=== Carolina Panthers ===
Following the conclusion of the NFL Europe season Durde was allocated to the Carolina Panthers in the US on 15 June 2005, as part of the NFL International Development Practice Squad program.

On 19 October 2005, Durde was released from the Panthers practice squad after testing positive for nandrolone on 1 August during a routine preseason drug test.

=== Hamburg Sea Devils (second stint) ===
After his departure from the Carolina Panthers, he returned to the Sea Devils for the 2006 NFL Europe season.

He was a member of Hamburg's 2007 NFL Europa World Bowl XV championship winning team. 2007 would be his last season with the Sea Devils due to the league ceasing operations following the conclusion of the season.

=== Kansas City Chiefs ===
In 2008 he was on the practice squad of the Kansas City Chiefs, for each of their pre-season games.

=== Flash de la courneuve ===
In 2009, he joined the La Courneuve Flash in France, and played under Patrick Esume as head coach.

== Coaching career ==
=== London Warriors ===
From 2011 to 2014, Durde served as the defensive coordinator for the London Warriors.

=== Dallas Cowboys (first stint) ===
From 2014 to 2015, Durde served as a coaching intern with the Dallas Cowboys through the NFL fellowship program.

=== NFLUK ===
Durde served as the head of football development at NFLUK from 2015 to 2018.

Concerned about the lack of a defined route into the league for players who did not go to high school or college in the United States, Durde worked alongside another British ex-NFL player - Osi Umenyiora - to create a training program and set-up meetings and try-outs with NFL teams. The initial iteration of this training camp in 2016, featured a small number of specifically selected football players who were currently playing amateur football in Europe. The training program came with the support of the NFL and was the subject of a 12-episode documentary series produced by NFL Films titled "NFL Undiscovered". Following the success of the program the NFL created the International Player Pathway Program in 2017.

=== Atlanta Falcons ===
In 2016, Durde joined the Atlanta Falcons under the Bill Walsh NFL diversity coaching fellowship.

On 11 April 2018, Durde was hired by the Atlanta Falcons as their new defensive quality control coach under head coach Dan Quinn. This hiring made him the first ever British full-time coach in NFL history and the first full time coach from outside the United States.

In 2020, he was promoted to outside linebackers coach.

=== Dallas Cowboys (second stint) ===
On 20 January 2021, Durde was hired by the Dallas Cowboys as their defensive line coach, reuniting him with then Cowboys defensive coordinator Dan Quinn.

=== Seattle Seahawks ===
On 13 February 2024, Durde was hired by the Seattle Seahawks as their defensive coordinator under new head coach Mike Macdonald. With this hiring Durde became the first British-born defensive coordinator in league history.

On 8 February 2026, Durde won Super Bowl LX with the Seattle Seahawks. With this Durde became the first British-born assistant coach to win the Super Bowl.

== Personal life ==
Durde and his wife, Kate, have two sons. Durde is a lifelong West Ham United supporter.
