= Pascal Dupraz =

French football manager (born 1962)

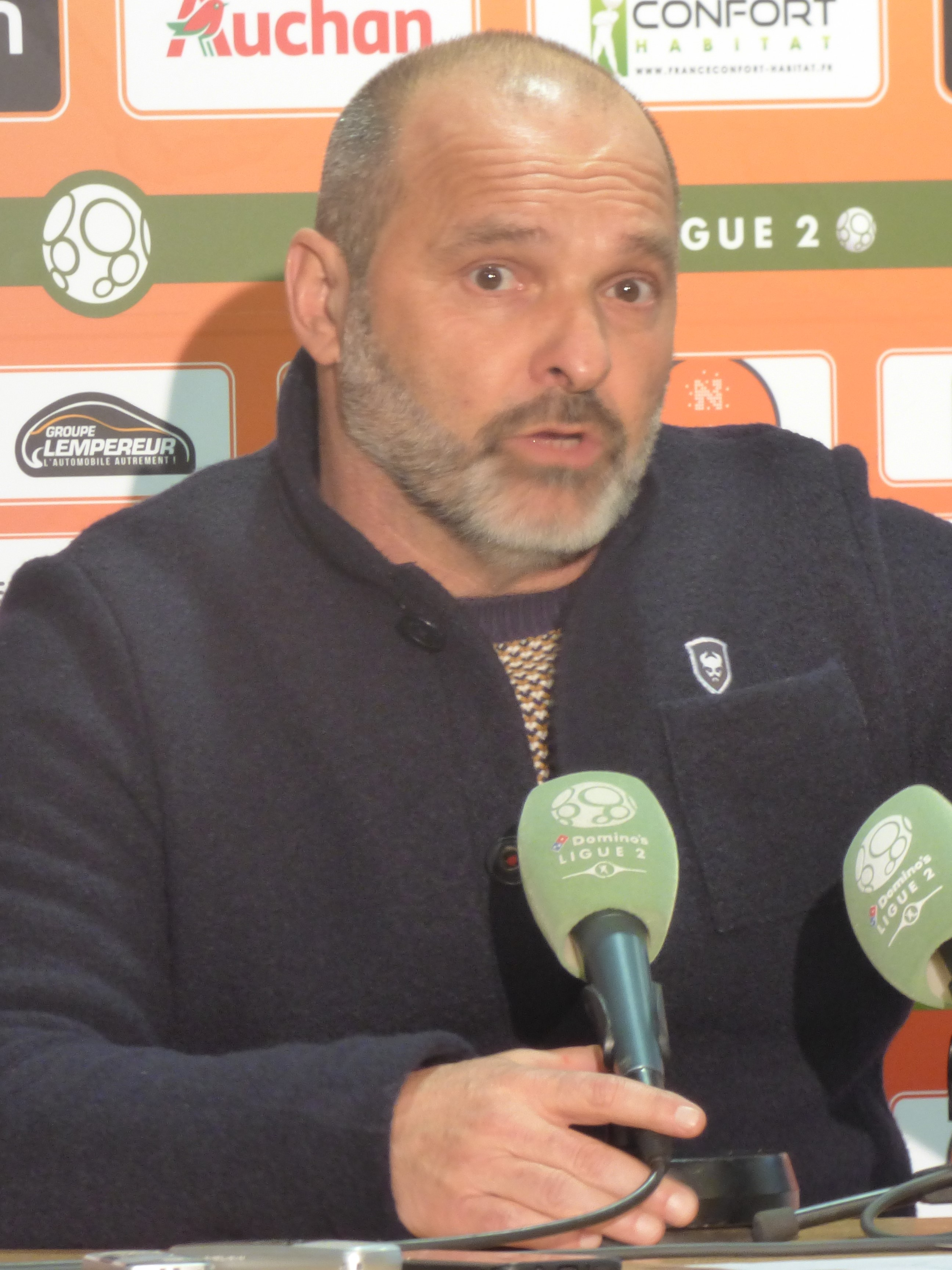
- Dupraz in 2020

Personal information
- Full name: Pascal Fernand Dupraz
- Date of birth: 19 September 1962 (age 64)
- Place of birth: Annemasse, Haute-Savoie, France
- Height: 1.72 m (5 ft 8 in)
- Position: Striker

Senior career*
Years	Team	Apps	(Gls)
1980–1981	Sochaux	4	(0)
1980–1982	Thonon	27	(5)
1982–1986	Brest	70	(13)
1986–1987	Mulhouse	31	(3)
1987–1989	Toulon	28	(1)
1989–1991	Gueugnon	37	(2)
Total		197	(24)

Managerial career
- 1991–2003: Gaillard
- 2003–2007: Croix-de-Savoie
- 2007–2009: Evian
- 2010: Evian
- 2012–2015: Evian
- 2016–2018: Toulouse
- 2019–2021: Caen
- 2021–2022: Saint-Étienne
- 2023: Dijon
- * Club domestic league appearances and goals

Pascal Fernand Dupraz (born 19 September 1962) is a French professional football manager and former player who played as a striker. He was most recently the manager of Dijon.

== Early life ==
Dupraz was born in Annemasse, Haute-Savoie.

== Managerial career ==
=== Évian ===
On 3 September 2012, Dupraz replaced Pablo Correa as manager of Évian. At the time, Evian was 18th in the table and in danger of relegation, but Duprez kept the club in Ligue 1, finishing the 2012–13 Ligue 1 season in 16th with ten wins, ten draws and 18 losses. The club improved to 14th in the 2013–14 Ligue 1, as he guided them to eleven wins, eleven draws and 16 losses. However, in the 2014–15 Ligue 1 season, Évian slipped to 18th was relegated after finishing with eleven wins, four draws and 23 losses. Dupraz was dismissed on 30 June 2015.

=== Toulouse ===
Dupraz was named manager of Toulouse in the Ligue 1 on 2 March 2016 following the resignation of Dominique Arribagé. When he took over the club, it was 19th in the table ten points adrift of safety with ten games to go. Miraculously, he managed to keep Toulouse in Ligue 1, getting them into 17th on the second last week of the season.

In Dupraz's first game in charge, Toulouse drew Marseille 1–1 away from home. He led Toulouse to five wins, three draws and two losses to finish the 2015–16 league season in 17th.

Dupraz was dismissed as Toulouse manager on 22 January 2018 with the club in 19th in Ligue 1 on 20 points from 22 matches (five wins, five draws and twelve losses), and facing relegation. He was replaced by Mickaël Debève.

=== Caen ===
Dupraz was named as the new Caen manager on 1 October 2019. After a year and a half and 55 matches, he was sacked by the club on 23 March 2021, and was replaced by Fabrice Vandeputte.

=== Saint-Étienne ===
On 14 December 2021, Dupraz was named manager of Ligue 1 side Saint-Étienne, his objective being to avoid the club's relegation. However, at the end of the season, the club was defeated in the relegation play-offs. Dupraz left at the end of his six-month contract.

== Media career ==
Dupraz was a consultant for the TV show J+1 on Canal+ during the 2015–16 Ligue 1 season, before being hired by Toulouse.

In March 2018, Dupraz worked as a pundit for TF1 to analyze 2018 FIFA World Cup matches. He was a commentator in a friendly on 26 March 2018, which saw the Netherlands meet Portugal. The game was shown on TFX and was seen by approximately 751,000 viewers.
