= DeAndre Smith =

American gridiron football player and coach (born 1968)

Indianapolis Colts
- Title: Running backs coach

Personal information
- Born: November 5, 1968 (age 58); St. Louis, Missouri, U.S.

Career information
- Position: Quarterback
- High school: University City & Berkeley (St. Louis, Missouri)
- College: Southwest Missouri State (1987–1990)
- NFL draft: 1990: undrafted

Career history

Playing
- Calgary Stampeders (1992); Aix-en-Provence Argonautes (1993)

Coaching
- Indiana State (1999–2000) Offensive coordinator & quarterbacks coach; Northern Illinois (2001–2004) Running backs coach & special teams coordinator; Miami (OH) (2005–2007) Running backs coach; New Mexico (2008) Running backs coach; UNLV (2009) Running backs coach; Illinois (2010–2011) Running backs coach; New Mexico (2012) Running backs coach; Syracuse (2013–2015) Running backs coach; Purdue (2016) Running backs coach; North Carolina (2017) Running backs coach; Utah State (2018) Running backs coach; Texas Tech (2019–2021) Running backs coach; New York Giants (2022) Running backs coach; Indianapolis Colts (2023–present) Running backs coach

Awards and highlights
- Consensus Division I-AA All-American (1990); 2× Gateway Offensive Player of the Year (1989, 1990); Gateway Offensive Player of the Decade; Missouri State Bears No. 1 retired

DeAndre Smith (born November 5, 1968) is an American football running backs coach for the Indianapolis Colts and former quarterback. He previously served as the running backs coach for the New York Giants and at Texas Tech from 2019 to 2021. He has coached other college football teams such as Indiana, Northern Illinois, New Mexico and Utah State.

== Playing career ==
=== College ===
Smith was the quarterback of a very potent triple-option offense for Missouri State football teams of the Bears' I-AA era. Smith led the Bears to the Gateway Football Conference championship and the 1989 NCAA Division I-AA and 1990 playoffs under coach Jesse Branch. Smith came to Missouri State from St. Louis, Missouri in 1987 and quarterbacked the Bears all four of his college years, with his top exploits coming in his final two seasons. During Smith's junior season, MSU finished 10-3 and got to the second round of the playoffs. When Smith was a senior MSU finished 9–3, losing in the playoff first round to Idaho. Smith was a two-time all-league first team quarterback.

Smith was the Gateway Offensive Player of the Year as both a junior and senior, and was the Gateway Offensive Player of the Decade for the league's first 10 years of existence, 1985–95. Smith was a consensus I-AA All-America as a senior, winning top honors from the Walter Camp Football Foundation, Associated Press, Football Gazette, The Sports Network and American Football Coaches Association. Smith's numbers were as notable as his honors, as he started 34 of the 45 MSU games he played, completing 281 of 493 passes for 4,080 yards and 18 touchdowns with a .570 completion mark. His 405 passing yards in 1990 at Tulsa set an MSU single-game record. He was also a prolific runner, carrying the ball 613 times for 2,276 yards and 40 more touchdowns.

He set MSU career records for plays run (1,106), total yards (6,356), points (242), touchdowns (40), completion percentage (.570) and consecutive games scoring a TD (10).

Smith was inducted into the MSU Athletics Hall of Fame in 2005. His #1 jersey was retired by MSU in 2012.

=== Professional ===
Smith played in the Ligue Élite de Football Américain in France for the Aix-en-Provence Argonautes in 1993. He also spent time in the Canadian Football League in 1992.

== Coaching career ==
=== Indiana State ===
Smith was hired by Indiana state as their offensive coordinator and Quarterbacks coach from (1999–2000).

=== Northern Illinois ===
He was then hired by Northern Illinois as their running backs coach and special team coach from (2001–2004). During his time in Northern Illinois he won his first bowl game with the team's victory over the Troy with the final score (34–21). He helped develop Michael Turner who led the Mid-American Conference (MAC) in rushing twice (2002–2003)

=== Miami RedHawks ===
On January 21, 2005, Smith was hired as their running backs coach and running game coordinator under head coach Shane Montgomery. He was the running backs coach for miami RedHawks from 2005 to 2007.

=== New Mexico ===
Smith was hired by New Mexico as their running backs coach under head coach Matt Wells (American football coach) in 2008.

=== UNLV ===
Smith was hired by UNLV as their running backs coach under head coach Mike Sanford Sr. in 2009. When Sanford got fired, Smith wasn't retained.

=== Illinois ===
Smith left UNLV after one season to join Illinois as their running backs coach from (2010–2011).

=== New Mexico(second stint) ===
Smith was hired by New Mexico in 2012 as their running backs coach under head coach Bob Davie (American football). Smith joined New Mexico to help develop his son Ryan Smith who was a freshman running back for New Mexico.

=== Syracuse ===
Smith was hired by Syracuse in 2013 as their running back coach reuniting him with his old offensive coordinator in Northern Illinois and now head coach Scott Shafer. Smith has coached nine different 1,000-yard rushers during his 14-year college coaching. Smith and the rest of the staff were fired with one game remaining after a 4–8 season in 2015.

=== Purdue ===
Smith was supposed to join Arkansas as their running back coach but later was hired by Purdue as their running backs coach under head coach Darrell Hazell in 2016.

=== North Carolina ===
On March 2, 2017, Smith was hired by North Carolina as their running backs coach under head coach Larry Fedora. Chris Kapilovic the offensive coordinator and Smith played together in college for the Missouri State.

=== Utah State ===
Smith was hired by Utah State as their running backs coach reuniting him with head coach Matt Wells (American football coach) which they worked together in 2008 in New Mexico.

=== Texas Tech ===
On December 12, 2018, Smith was hired by Texas Tech as their running backs coach, following Matt Wells who was hired as the program's head coach. Wells was fired in the middle of the 2021 season, with offensive coordinator Sonny Cumbie being named interim head coach. The program hired Joey McGuire as Wells's permanent replacement; McGuire retained Smith as the Red Raiders' running backs coach.

=== New York Giants ===
On February 11, 2022, Smith was hired by the New York Giants as their running backs coach under head coach Brian Daboll.

=== Indianapolis Colts ===
On February 18, 2023, Smith was reported to be hired by the Indianapolis Colts as their running backs coach under head coach Shane Steichen.
