= Amiens Spartiates =

Amiens Spartiates
Established	1984
Nicknames	Les Spartiates
Team colors	Blue & yellow
Based in	Amiens, France
Home ground	Stade du Grand Marais
General manager	Philippe Vandurme
Head coach	Jeff Hand
League	Casque d'Or
Champion	Ligue Élite; 2004, 2010, 2012

The Amiens Spartiates are a French American football team based in Amiens.

The team plays in Ligue Élite de Football Américain (Division 2).

== Achievements ==
- Champion of France (Div.I) 2004, 2010, 2012
- Vice Champion of France (Div.I) 2005
- Champion of France (Div.II) 1997
- Junior Champion of France 1999, 2010, 2011
