= Olympique Thonon Chablais =

Defunct football club based in Thonon-les-Bains, France

Thonon
- Full name: Olympique Thonon Chablais
- Founded: 1909 (as Club Sportif de Thonon)
- Dissolved: 2007 (merged with Football Croix-de-Savoie 74)
- Stadium: Stade Joseph-Moynat
- Capacity: 3,600

Olympique Thonon Chablais, known as Club Sportif de Thonon until 1987, was a football club based in Thonon-les-Bains, France. Founded in 1909, the club's colours were yellow and blue. The team played its home matches at the Stade Joseph-Moynat.

From 1979 to 1987, Thonon played in the Division 2. In 2007, the club merged with Football Croix-de-Savoie 74 to form Olympique Croix-de-Savoie 74.

== Name changes ==
- 1909–1987: Club Sportif de Thonon
- 1987–1992: Olympique Thonon-les-Bains
- 1992–1997: Thonon Chablais Football (merged with Stella Thonon)
- 1997–2007: Olympique Thonon Chablais

== Honours ==
Olympique Thonon Chablais honours
Honour	No.	Years
Division d'Honneur Rhône-Alpes	1	1977–78
Championnat National 3 Group F	1	1993–94
Coupe Rhône-Alpes	1	1988–89
