= Stade Georges-Carcassonne =

Multipurpose stadium in France

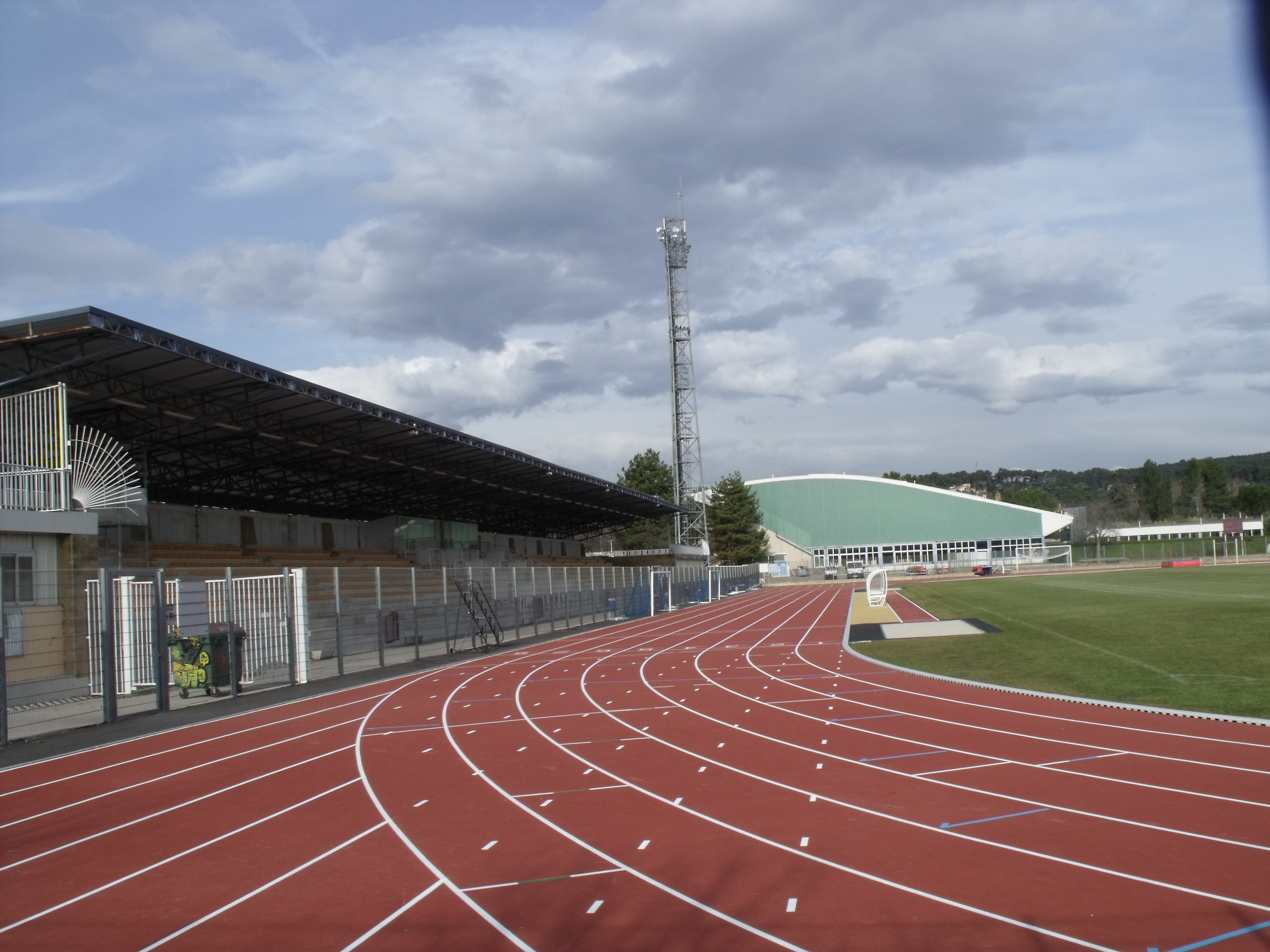

- Location within France
- Address: 10 av. des déportés de la Résistance; 13100 Aix-en-Provence
- Coordinates: 43.525°N 5.461°E
- Capacity: 3,700
- Surface: Natural grass turf

Construction
- Built: 1953

Tenants
- AS Aix-en-Provence; Aix-en-Provence Argonautes

The Stade Georges-Carcassonne is a multi-purpose stadium located Aix-en-Provence, France.

Its field is natural grass, and the capacity is up to 3,700 people. It hosts the matches of local football team AS Aix-en-Provence and its reserve team. It is also the stadium where the Aix-en-Provence Argonautes (American Football) team plays. It was constructed in 1953.

== Gallery ==
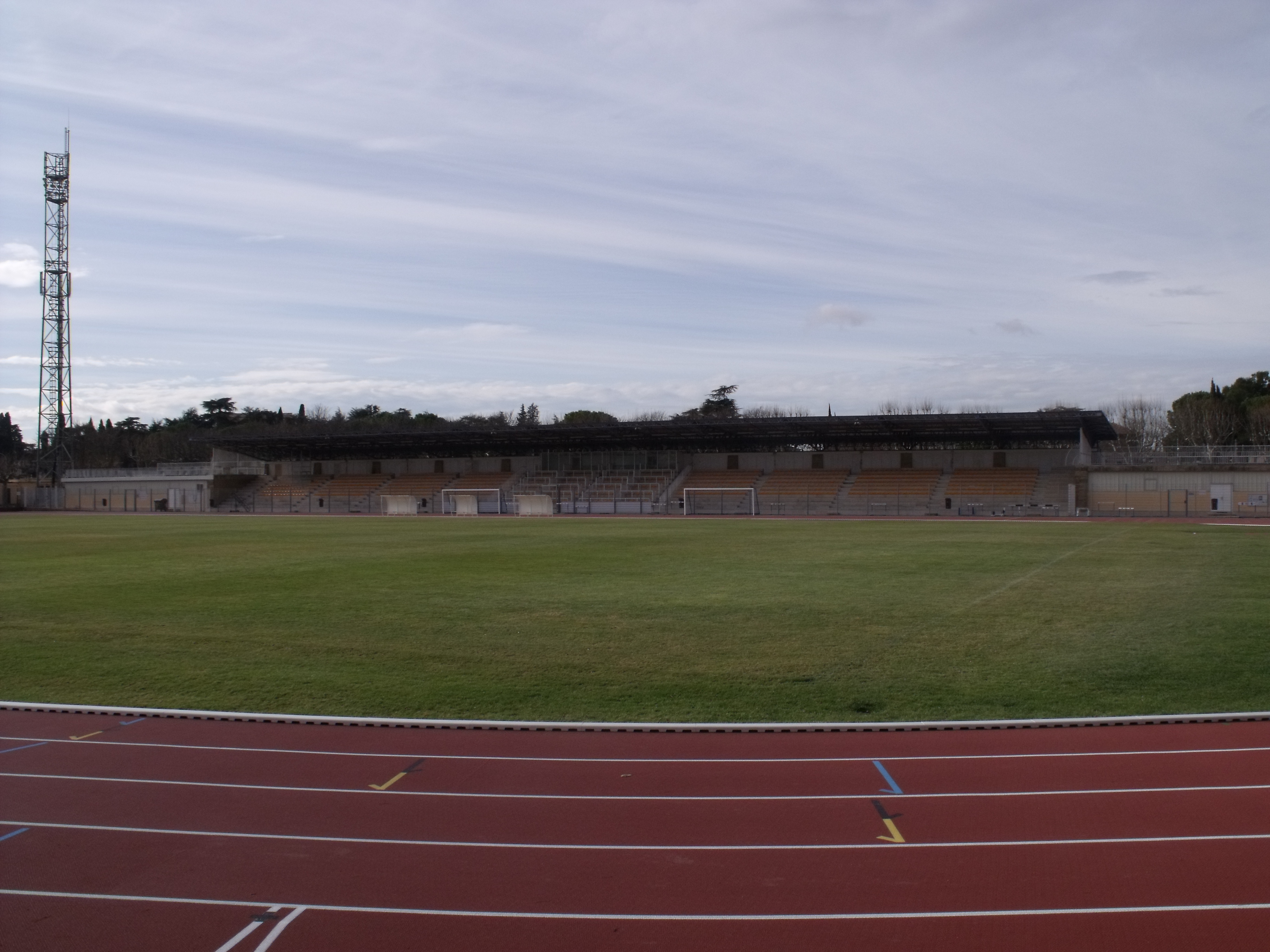
Grass Field of Georges-Carcassonne Stadium
