= Ours de Toulouse =

American football team in France

Logo

General information
- Founded: 1986
- Stadium: Stade des Argoulets
- Headquartered: Toulouse, Garonne
- Website: www.ours-toulouse.com

League / conference affiliations
- Championnat Élite Division 1

The Ours de Toulouse (French for 'Toulouse Bears') are an American football club based in Toulouse, Garonne, France. They have sometimes been known as Ours de Toulouse Blagnac through an association with the neighbouring city of Blagnac.
They were founded in 1986, although a precursor organization, the Toulouse Centurians, was established in 1983. They play in the Division 1 Elite Championship, the country's top level.

The club claims a French American football attendance record of 11,000 for a 1990 game against the Moscow Bears played at Toulouse Stadium.
