= Aboubacar Sylla (footballer, born 1983) =

Guinean footballer (born 1983)

Personal information
- Date of birth: 23 December 1983 (age 42)
- Place of birth: Conakry, Guinea
- Height: 1.80 m (5 ft 11 in)
- Position: Striker

Senior career*
Years	Team	Apps	(Gls)
2004–2006	Gueugnon	28	(3)
2006–2007	Croix-de-Savoie		
2007–2008	Montceau Bourgogne		
2008–2009	AS Cherbourg	16	(0)
2009–2010	ÉDS Montluçon	26	(13)
2010–2011	Aurillac	32	(6)
2011–2013	Yzeure	5	(2)
2014–2016	SA Thiers		

International career
2005	Guinea	1	(0)
- * Club domestic league appearances and goals

Aboubacar Sylla (born 23 December 1983 in Conakry) is a Guinean former professional footballer who played as a striker. He played on the professional level in Ligue 2 for FC Gueugnon.
