= Frédéric Chevalme =

French footballer (born 1974)

Personal information
- Date of birth: 14 January 1974 (age 52)
- Place of birth: Montbéliard, France
- Height: 1.83 m (6 ft 0 in)
- Position: Forward

Senior career*
Years	Team	Apps	(Gls)
1991–1994	Annecy	?	(?)
1994–1995	Cercle Dijon	?	(?)
1995–1996	Angers	16	(1)
1996–1998	Charleville	47	(7)
1998	Besançon	14	(7)
1998–1999	Thouars	25	(6)
1999–2000	Gap	?	(?)
2000–2001	Saint-Pierre	?	(?)
2001–2002	Gap	?	(?)
2002–2003	Tours	19	(6)
2003–2006	Croix de Savoie	82	(13)
2006	Rumilly	?	(?)
2006–2008	Cruseilles	?	(?)
- * Club domestic league appearances and goals

Frédéric Chevalme (born 14 January 1974) is a retired French professional footballer who played as a forward.

Chevalme played for OFC Charleville during the 1996–97 Ligue 2 season.
