= Larry Legault =

Canadian-French sports coach

Larry Legault (born in Canada) has coached American football in France for several years as well as in Switzerland. He has a leadership of the Thonon Black Panthers since 2005. Today, he is a technical director of the team and is also the coach of France National Team. He was previously head coach of the Aix-en-Provence Argonautes from 1990-1993. Legault also spent seasons as the head coach of the Geneva Seahawks of the Nationalliga A (American football) in Switzerland.

== High school and university career ==
Before coming to Europe, Legault has coached in the AAA Cegep league where he coordinated at Vanier College and the Cégep du Vieux Montréal. From 1997 to 2003 he was the main coach at Bishop's University, Quebec, Canada. He also moved to Mount Allison University to be a defensive coordinator. in Sackville, New Brunswick, Canada.
