= Parc des sports de Marville =

Football stadium in La Courneuve, France

- Interactive map of Parc des sports de Marville
- Full name: Parc départemental des sports de Marville
- Former names: Parc interdépartemental des sports de Marville, Parc des sports de La Courneuve
- Location: La Courneuve, Saint-Denis
- Operator: Département of Seine-Saint-Denis

Construction
- Opened: 1922

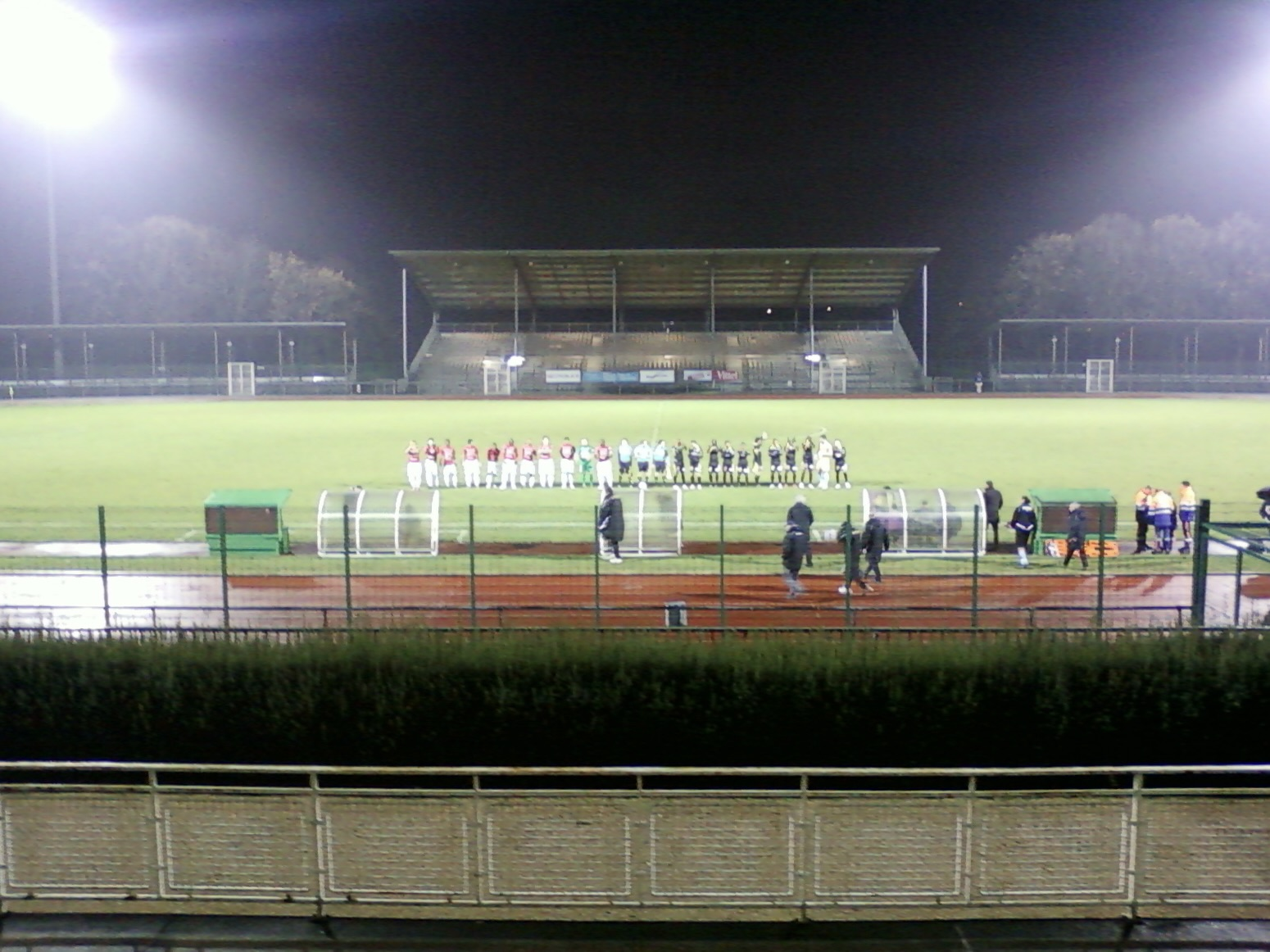
Presentation-alfortville-beauvais.jpg

The Parc départemental des sports de Marville (French pronunciation: [paʁk depaʁtəmɑ̃tal de spɔʁ də maʁvil], Marville Departmental Sports Park), commonly called Parc des sports de Marville or just Parc de Marville, is a public sports and leisure complex stretching across the municipalities of La Courneuve and Saint-Denis, France. Activities on offer include various football codes, beach volley, track and field, archery, sport shooting and swimming.

It used be known as a "parc interdépartemental", a class of community sports parks in the Greater Paris area that are co-managed by the city of Paris proper and a neighbouring département. Since 2019, the département of Seine-Saint-Denis has been managing the park on its own, and it has been renamed accordingly as a "parc départemental".

== Stade Marville ==
Stade Marville
- Interactive map of Stade Marville
- Location: 51 avenue Roger-Salengro, La Courneuve, Seine-Saint-Denis, France
- Capacity: 10,000
- Surface: Grass

Construction
- Opened: 1921 (hippodrome); 1932 (stadium)

Tenant
- Red Star F.C. (1998–2002; 2019–present)

=== History ===
The park's best known venue is the Stade Marville. It was originally envisioned as a hippodrome and then a greyhound race track, but neither activities panned out. Instead the entire domain started being used for cross country races, and officially became known as Parc des sports de La Courneuve in 1922. It proved popular enough that the French Athletics Federation considered moving its headquarters from Colombes to La Courneuve, before transportation concerns put a damper on the possibility. The département of Seine (as it was then known) still financed an extensive makeover to remodel the main building into a bonafide sports stadium, with the new version opening in 1932.

=== Tenants ===
The stadium has had a variety of short-term tenants over the years, mostly clubs from close Paris suburbs who outgrew their regular venue by ascending through the ranks of their sport.

Perhaps the most notable is Red Star F.C., a soccer club from nearby Saint-Ouen-sur-Seine, which played at Marville between 1998–99 and 2001–02, originally to satisfy the requirements of Division 2, for which its usual venue Stade Bauer was unsuitable. The club had long considered permanently moving some of its activities to Marville and finally followed suit in 2019, when it transferred its academy to the stadium. In 2021, Red Star's professional team also started training at Stade de Marville.

Another club with strong ties to the venue is the Flash de La Courneuve, a gridiron football club which has used the venue for its European Football League games. Prior to the Red Star's move, the club had expressed interest in making the stadium its main venue.

== Marville Swimming Pool ==
In 1955, a semi-permanent swimming pool was added to the park. It was replaced by a larger, permanent facility in 1975, called Piscine de Marville or sometimes Piscine de Marville Saint-Denis. The building will be replaced again by a new aquatic center in time for the 2024 Paris Olympics.

== Events ==
=== 2024 Olympic Games ===
The Parc de Marville will host several training venues during the 2024 Summer Olympics. The new aquatic center was originally slated to host water polo competitions, but this changed and it will now only act as a training facility. The park's futsal hall will be used for judo training, while five pitches will be installed to accommodate rugby sevens teams.

=== Fête de L'Humanité ===
Between 1960 and 1965, and again in 1971, the Parc des sports hosted the Fête de L'Humanité, one of France's major cultural festivals, sponsored by communist daily newspaper L'Humanité.

=== National Ice Hockey Center bid ===
La Courneuve was a candidate city for the French Ice Hockey Federation's tentative National Ice Hockey Center in 2009, with the Parc de Marville as the likely construction site. But it was passed over in favor of what eventually became Aren'Ice in Cergy.
