= Franck Riboud =

French businessman (born 1955)

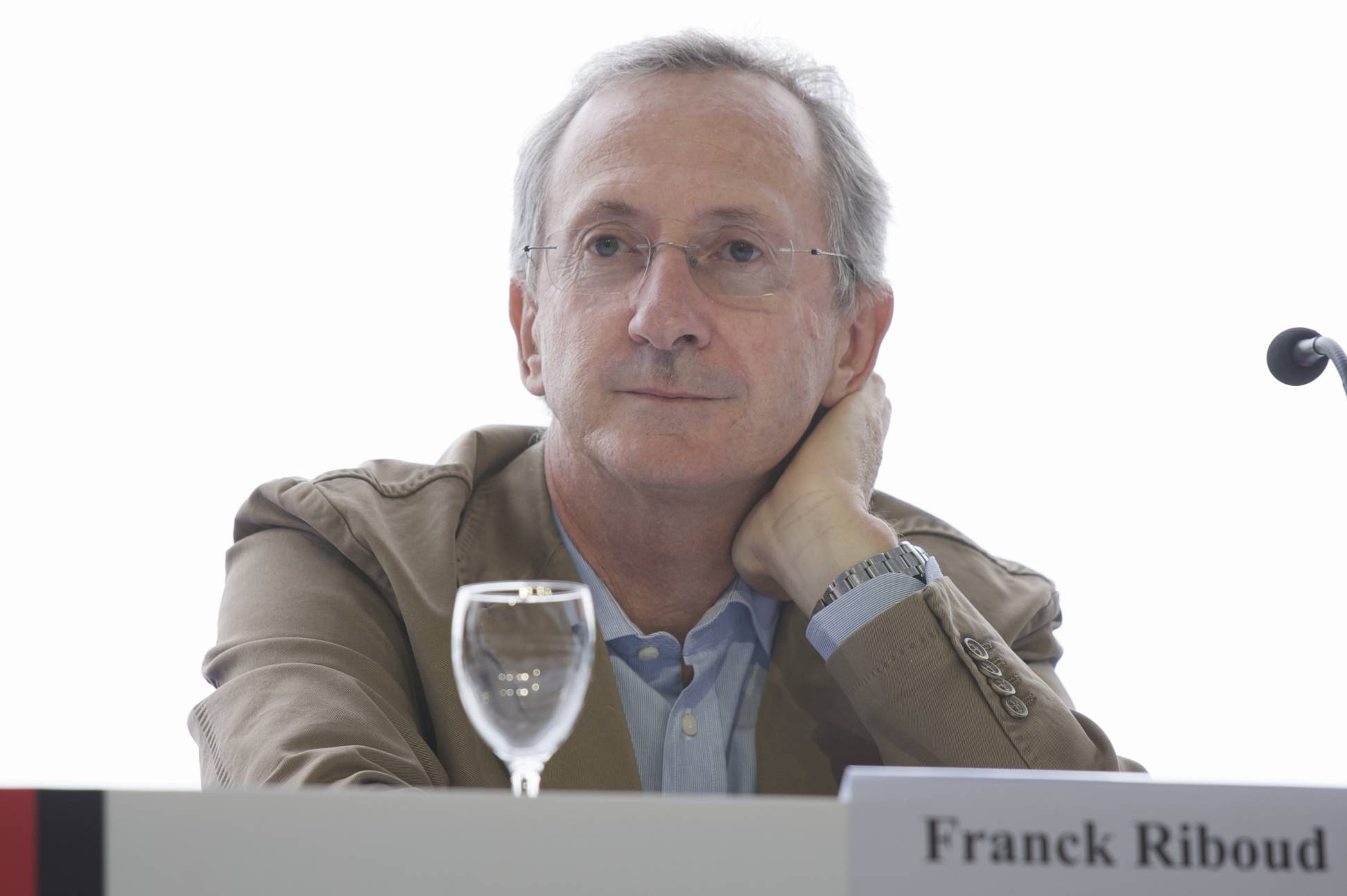
- Franck Riboud in MEDEF Summer University '08
- Born: 7 November 1955 (age 70); Lyon, France
- Education: Lycée Ampère
- Alma mater: École Polytechnique Fédérale de Lausanne
- Occupation: Chairman of Danone

Franck Riboud (born 7 November 1955) is a French businessman. He served as the chairman of Danone.

== Biography ==
Franck Riboud was born on 7 November 1955 in Lyon. He is the son of Antoine Riboud, the previous CEO, who transformed the former European glassmaker BSN Group into a leading player in the food industry. He attended the Lycée Ampère in Lyon, and the École Polytechnique Fédérale de Lausanne in Switzerland.

Riboud took over the reins at Danone from his father in 1996, although his family only spoke for 1% of Danone's share capital at the time. On 1 October 2014, he was succeeded by Emmanuel Faber as the CEO of Danone.

He is on the board of directors for Renault SA. He also sits on the board of directors of the Consumer Goods Forum. He is member of IESE's International Advisory Board (IAB).

== See also ==
- Danone
