= Nathan Parseghian =

American football player (born 1984)

Miami RedHawks
- Position: Placekicker

Personal information
- Born: December 10, 1984; Sylvania, Ohio

Career information
- College: Miami (OH) (2006-2008)

Awards and highlights
- 1st Team All-MAC

Nathan Parseghian (Armenian: Արա Րաոլ Պարսէքյան, born December 10, 1984, in Sylvania, Ohio) is a former placekicker for the Miami Redhawks football team, and the great-grandnephew of Ara Parseghian.

== High school ==
Nathan attended Toledo St. John's Jesuit High School and played on the football team

== College ==
After playing football at Hargrave Military Academy for a year, Nathan transferred to Miami University in the fall of 2004. He joined the team in January 2005. After getting limited playing time as a freshman in 2005, Nathan saw significant playing time his sophomore and junior seasons, before having a breakout senior year. He was 1st Team All-MAC his senior season completing 20/23 FG's. For his career he completed 35/49 FG's, and 47/47 extra points

== Personal life ==
After seeing special teams consultant Gary Zauner in December, Nathan lived in Marco Island, while training in Naples, FL for his NFL Pro Day in Oxford, Ohio on March 20. He briefly played for the Billings Outlaws, an indoor football team in Montana.
