= Elancourt Templiers =

Elancourt Templiers
helmet
Established	1986
Team colors	Burgundy & gold
Based in	Élancourt, France
Home ground	Complexe Sportif Europe (1,500 seating)
General manager	(France) George Agostinho
Head coach	(United States) Paul Schudel
League	Ligue Élite
Website	Elancourt Templiers official web site

The Elancourt Templiers are a French American football team based in the city of Élancourt.

The team plays in Ligue Élite de Football Américain and in European Football League.

The club is training and plays its games at the Complexe Sportif Europe of Élancourt, the club also plays some matches, European Cup at Stade Guy-Boniface, as the final EFAF Cup in 2005.

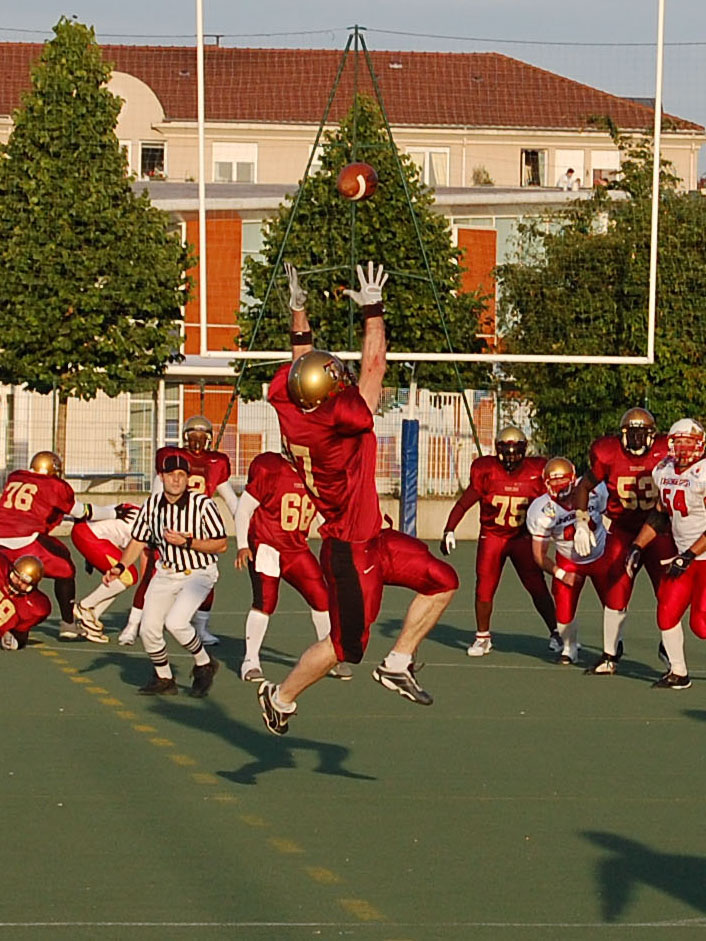
Semi final championship élite 2008, Élancourt Templiers Vs Aix-en-Provence Argonautes

== Achievements ==
- 2005: Runner up EFAF Cup
- 2008: Runner up Champion of France
