= Thonon Black Panthers =

French American football club

Logo

General information
- Founded: 1987
- Stadium: Stade Joseph-Moynat (1998–present) 3500 spect.
- Headquartered: Thonon-les-Bains, France

Personnel
- General manager: Benoît Sirouet France
- Head coach: Fabien Ducousso France

League / conference affiliations
- Ligue Élite de Football Américain; Division 1

Championships
- Division championships: 0 France Championship elite division Champions

Current uniform

The Black Panthers of Thonon, commonly referred to as Thonon Black Panthers, is a French American football club based in Thonon-les-Bains (Haute-Savoie) and founded in 1987 by Benoît Sirouet, Nicolas Schpoliansky and Frederic Mériguet.

Jérôme Garnier quickly joined the three founding members and became the first President of the Club.

The first Head Coach of the team was called Jolly Bruno, former player of Blue Angels of Joinville le Pont.

Now chaired by Benoît Sirouet, the club has led since 2017 by Fabien Ducousso also known as Coach Hippo.

== Teams ==
The club has four different teams of American football and three flag football.

- The elite team in the first French division, the Diamond Helmet since 2005.
- The reserve is playing in the Romande League of American Football, the NSFL since 2011.
- Juniors, champions of France in 2011.
- Cadets since 2010.
- As three teams flag football (-15 years, -18 years, and +18 years).

== Awards ==
=== Seniors ===
- France's Championship Elite (Diamond Helmet)
  - Champion (7): 2013, 2014, 2019, 2023, 2024, 2025, 2026
  - Vice Champion (7): 2007, 2009, 2012, 2015, 2017, 2018, 2022
- France's Second Division League (Golden Helmet)
  - Champion (1): 2004
- CEFL Bowl
  - Champion (1): 2025
  - Finalist (2): 2023, 2026
- EFL Bowl
  - Champions (1): 2017
- EFAF Cup
  - Champions (1): 2013
  - Finalist (1): 2009

=== Juniors ===
- Junior Championship of France

Champion ** (3): 2004, 2011, 2012

Vice Champion ** (3): 2006, 2007 and 2008

=== Flag ===
- Championship of France 16
  - Champion (1): 2002
  - Vice Champion (2): 2008, 2009
- France Championship -16
  - Champion (2): 2005, 2006
  - Vice Champion (1): 2008
- Regional Championship 16
  - Champion (2): 2008, 2009
  - Vice Champion (1): 2011
- Regional Championship -16
  - Champion (5): 1998, 1997, 2001, 2005, 2006
  - Vice Champion (1): 2009, 2011

== Season by season ==
Season	Division	Results
1990	D3	Semi-finalist
1991	D2	Regular season
1992	D2	Regular season
1993	D2	Regular season
1994	D2	Regular season
1995	D2	Regular season
1996	D2	Regular season
1997	D2	Demi-finaliste

Season	Division	Results
1998	D1	1/4 finalist
1999	D1	Semi-finalist
2000	D1	Semi-finalist
2001	D1	1/4 finalist
2002	D1	Regular season
2003	D2	Semi-finalist
2004	D2	Champion
2005	D1	Regular season

Season	Division	Results
2006	D1	Regular season
2007	D1	Finalist
2008	D1	Semi-finalist
2009	D1	Finalist
2010	D1	Semi-finalist
2011	D1	Regular season
2012	D1	Finalist
2013	D1	Champion

Season	Division	Results
2014	D1	Champion
2015	D1	Finalist
2016	D1	Regular season
2017	D1	Finalist
2018	D1	Finalist
2019	D1	Champion

== Personalities linked to the club ==
=== Staff ===
- Benoit Sirouet France Founder, former player and current president
- Nicolas SchpolianskyFrance Founder
- Frederic MériguetFrance Founder
- Jérôme Garnier France Former President
- Jolly Bruno (player) France Former Head Coach
- Larry Legault Canada Head Coach, Team HC France, former HC of Gaiters of Bishop's

=== Notable players ===
- Damon Thomas United States Former player, WR Wayne State Wildcats, Buffalo Bills
- Dimitri Kiernan France player, former coach (Carabins CIS Canada)
- Tory Cooper United States RB, Citadel Athletics NCAA D-1 AA
- Jason Jackson (player) United States
- Patrick Hall (player) United States RB
- Stephan Neville United States RB (Stonehill College NCAA DII)
- Baylen Laury United States RB
- Maxime Sprauel France Player (ex Carabins, CIS, Canada)
- Alex Sy France Former player (ex Carabins, CIS, Canada)
- Bastien Pereira France Player (future Carabins, CIS, Canada)
- Fred Wells Jr United States Former player, RB / WR (Northern Michigan University, NCAA D1-AA)
- Jimmie Russell United States Former player, QB (Bethune-Cookman University NCAA D1-AA)
- Brandon Minch United States Former player, DE / FB (Wesleyan University, NCAA DIII)
- Chris Dolan, United States Former Player, OL/DL University of Maryland NCAA- D1,
- John Allanach, Canada Head Coach, former player LB (Mount Allison Mounties, CIS, Canada)
- Sundee Jones, Canada Head Coach, former player RB (Mount Allison Mounties, CIS, Canada)

== Media ==
The Black Panthers of Thonon-les-Bains were the first in France to broadcast all of their regular season games live on the Internet. The BPWEBTV created in 2010 was well-received, and broadened for the 2011 season.
