= La Courneuve Flash =

French American football team based in La Courneuve, France

La Courneuve Flash
helmet
Established	1984
Nicknames	Flash
Team colors	Black and yellow
Based in	La Courneuve, France
Home ground	Stade Géo André (1,500 seating) Stade Marville (10,000 seating)
League	Ligue Élite
Champion	Ligue Élite; 1997, 2000, 2003, 2005, 2006, 2007, 2008, 2009, 2011, 2017, 2018, 2022
Website	http://www.flashfootball.org/

Flash de La Courneuve, commonly referred to as La Courneuve Flash, is a French American football team based in La Courneuve, France. The team plays in Ligue Élite de Football Américain and in the European Football League.

== History ==
The La Courneuve Flash were established on February 4, 1984.

== Championships ==
=== Ligue Élite ===
Ligue Élite championships
The Flash are twelve-time Ligue Élite champions having won the championship in 1997, 2000, 2003, 2005, 2006, 2007, 2008, 2009, 2011, 2017, 2018 and 2022.

Ligue Élite runners up
The Flash are six-time Ligue Élite runners up having made the championship game in 1998, 2001, 2002, 2010, 2013 and 2024.

=== European Football League ===
European Football League runners up
The Flash are three-time European Football League runners up having made the championship game Eurobowl in 1998, 2006 and 2009.

=== Central European Football League ===
CEFL Bowl champion
The Flash won the Central European Football League in 2023.
