= Aix-en-Provence Argonautes =

French American football team

General information
- Founded: 1986
- Stadium: Complexe sportif du Val de l'Arc
- Headquartered: Aix-en-Provence, France
- Website: http://www.argonautes-aix.com

Personnel
- General manager: Manu Maguet
- Head coach: Jake Hale
- President: Thierry Jamet

League / conference affiliations
- Ligue Élite de Football Américain; Division 1

Championships
- League championships: 0; 8 (1990, 1991, 1992, 1995, 1998, 1999, 2001, 2002) div_champs = 8 1990, 1991, 1992, 1995, 1998, 1999, 2001, 2002

The Aix-en-Provence Argonautes are a French American football team based in Aix-en-Provence established in 1986. The team plays in top level Ligue Élite de Football Américain.

== History ==
The team was established in 1986. In their second year, the Argonautes won the title in the second division in France. In 1989 they had their first appearance in the French final which they lost to Paris Castors. The following three years the Argonautes won their first three national championships. From 1989 to 2004 they made it to the final each year, becoming French Champions eight times. Their last appearance in the final was in 2006. Six years later the Argonautes have been relegated to the second division.

In 2014 Aix won again the second division title and was promoted to the top first division.

== Championships ==
- Ligue Élite de Football Américain
  - Champions: 8 (1990, 1991, 1992, 1995, 1998, 1999, 2001, 2002)
  - Runners-up: 9 (1989, 1993, 1994, 1996, 1997, 2000, 2003, 2004, 2006)
- EFL
  - Runners-up: 1 (1996)

== Notable players and coaches ==
- DeAndre Smith QB 1993, Current 2023 Indianapolis Colts running backs coach
- Larry Legault Head coach 1990-1993
- Matt Hove Head coach 2008
- Jim Criner Head coach 2009-2010
- Ryan Perrilloux QB 2016
