= Stade Joseph-Moynat =

Stadium in Thonon-les-Bains, France

Coordinates: 46°21′54″N 6°28′4″E

Stade Joseph-Moynat is a multi-purpose stadium in Thonon-les-Bains, France. It is currently used for American football matches and is the home stadium of Thonon Black Panthers. The stadium is able to hold from 3,000 to 6,000 people. It is also the home of association football club Thonon Evian Grand Genève F.C.
