= List of Mid-Eastern Athletic Conference football standings =

This is a list of yearly Mid-Eastern Athletic Conference football standings.

== MEAC standings ==
1971 Mid-Eastern Athletic Conference football standings
	Conf.					Overall
Team	W		L		T	W		L		T
Morgan State $	5	–	0	–	1	6	–	4	–	1
North Carolina Central	5	–	1	–	0	7	–	2	–	0
South Carolina State	3	–	2	–	1	6	–	3	–	1
North Carolina A&T	3	–	2	–	1	6	–	4	–	1
Maryland Eastern Shore	1	–	4	–	1	1	–	5	–	2
Howard	1	–	5	–	0	4	–	5	–	0
Delaware State	1	–	5	–	0	1	–	8	–	0
$ – Conference champion

1972 Mid-Eastern Athletic Conference football standings
	Conf.					Overall
Team	W		L		T	W		L		T
No. 10 North Carolina Central $	5	–	1	–	0	9	–	2	–	0
No. 13 North Carolina A&T	4	–	2	–	0	8	–	2	–	0
Morgan State	4	–	2	–	0	5	–	5	–	0
Maryland Eastern Shore	4	–	2	–	0	4	–	5	–	0
Howard	2	–	4	–	0	6	–	4	–	0
Delaware State	2	–	4	–	0	5	–	4	–	0
South Carolina State	0	–	6	–	0	1	–	9	–	0
$ – Conference champion; Rankings from NAIA Division I poll

1973 Mid-Eastern Athletic Conference football standings
	Conf.					Overall
Team	W		L		T	W		L		T
North Carolina Central $	5	–	1	–	0	7	–	4	–	0
South Carolina State	4	–	1	–	1	7	–	3	–	1
Howard	4	–	2	–	0	8	–	2	–	0
Morgan State	4	–	2	–	0	6	–	3	–	0
Maryland Eastern Shore	2	–	4	–	0	4	–	5	–	0
North Carolina A&T	1	–	4	–	1	4	–	6	–	1
Delaware State	0	–	6	–	0	0	–	11	–	0
$ – Conference champion

1974 Mid-Eastern Athletic Conference football standings
	Conf.					Overall
Team	W		L		T	W		L		T
No. 11 South Carolina State $	5	–	1	–	0	8	–	4	–	0
Howard	4	–	1	–	1	8	–	2	–	1
North Carolina Central	4	–	1	–	1	7	–	2	–	2
Morgan State	4	–	2	–	0	5	–	5	–	0
North Carolina A&T	2	–	4	–	0	5	–	6	–	0
Maryland Eastern Shore	1	–	5	–	0	2	–	6	–	0
Delaware State	0	–	6	–	0	3	–	6	–	0
$ – Conference champion; Rankings from NAIA Division I poll

1975 Mid-Eastern Athletic Conference football standings
	Conf.					Overall
Team	W		L		T	W		L		T
South Carolina State +	5	–	1	–	0	8	–	2	–	1
North Carolina A&T +	5	–	1	–	0	8	–	3	–	0
Howard	4	–	2	–	0	8	–	3	–	0
North Carolina Central	3	–	2	–	1	5	–	4	–	1
Delaware State	2	–	4	–	0	5	–	5	–	0
Morgan State	1	–	4	–	1	4	–	5	–	1
Maryland Eastern Shore	0	–	6	–	0	0	–	10	–	0
+ – Conference co-champions

1976 Mid-Eastern Athletic Conference football standings
	Conf.					Overall
Team	W		L		T	W		L		T
No. T–8 South Carolina State +	5	–	1	–	0	10	–	1	–	0
Morgan State +	5	–	1	–	0	6	–	4	–	0
North Carolina A&T	3	–	2	–	1	6	–	4	–	1
Howard	3	–	2	–	1	5	–	5	–	1
North Carolina Central	2	–	4	–	0	6	–	5	–	0
Delaware State	1	–	5	–	0	3	–	7	–	1
Maryland Eastern Shore	1	–	5	–	0	2	–	9	–	0
+ – Conference co-champions; Rankings from Associated Press poll

1977 Mid-Eastern Athletic Conference football standings
	Conf.					Overall
Team	W		L		T	W		L		T
No. 4 South Carolina State $	6	–	0	–	0	9	–	1	–	1
North Carolina A&T	5	–	1	–	0	7	–	4	–	0
Delaware State	4	–	2	–	0	7	–	4	–	0
Morgan State	3	–	3	–	0	4	–	6	–	1
Howard	2	–	4	–	0	5	–	5	–	0
Maryland Eastern Shore	1	–	5	–	0	3	–	8	–	0
North Carolina Central	0	–	6	–	0	1	–	10	–	0
$ – Conference champion; Rankings from Associated Press poll

1978 Mid-Eastern Athletic Conference football standings
	Conf.					Overall
Team	W		L		T	W		L		T
No. 6 South Carolina State $	5	–	0	–	1	8	–	2	–	1
North Carolina A&T	4	–	2	–	0	6	–	6	–	0
Delaware State	3	–	3	–	0	3	–	7	–	0
Morgan State	2	–	3	–	1	4	–	6	–	1
Howard	2	–	4	–	0	4	–	6	–	0
Maryland Eastern Shore	2	–	4	–	0	3	–	8	–	0
North Carolina Central	2	–	4	–	0	3	–	8	–	0
$ – Conference champion; The conference was a hybrid of NCAA Division I-AA and Division II programs. Morgan State, Maryland-Eastern Shore, and North Carolina Central were classified as NCAA Division II. All the other teams were Division I-AA.; Rankings from Associated Press poll

1979 Mid-Eastern Athletic Conference football standings
	Conf.					Overall
Team	W		L		T	W		L		T
Morgan State $	5	–	0	–	0	9	–	2	–	0
South Carolina State	4	–	1	–	0	8	–	3	–	0
North Carolina A&T	2	–	2	–	1	4	–	6	–	1
Howard	2	–	3	–	0	5	–	6	–	0
Delaware State	1	–	4	–	1	4	–	5	–	1
North Carolina Central	1	–	4	–	0	2	–	8	–	1
Maryland Eastern Shore	0	–	0	–	0	3	–	7	–	1
$ – Conference champion; Maryland Eastern Shore games did not count as conference games in 1979

1980 Mid-Eastern Athletic Conference football standings
	Conf.					Overall
Team	W		L		T	W		L		T
No. T–3 South Carolina State $	5	–	0	–	0	10	–	1	–	0
North Carolina A&T	3	–	2	–	0	9	–	3	–	0
Howard	2	–	2	–	1	6	–	2	–	2
Bethune–Cookman	2	–	2	–	1	5	–	4	–	1
Florida A&M	2	–	3	–	0	5	–	6	–	0
Delaware State	0	–	5	–	0	2	–	9	–	0
$ – Conference champion; Rankings from Associated Press poll

1981 Mid-Eastern Athletic Conference football standings
	Conf.					Overall
Team	W		L		T	W		L		T
No. 3 South Carolina State $^	5	–	0	–	0	10	–	3	–	0
Florida A&M	4	–	1	–	0	7	–	4	–	0
Bethune–Cookman	3	–	2	–	0	6	–	4	–	0
Howard	2	–	3	–	0	6	–	5	–	0
Delaware State	1	–	4	–	0	2	–	9	–	0
North Carolina A&T	0	–	5	–	0	3	–	8	–	0
$ – Conference champion; ^ – NCAA Division I-AA playoff participant; Rankings from NCAA Division I-AA Football Committee poll

1982 Mid-Eastern Athletic Conference football standings
	Conf.					Overall
Team	W		L		T	W		L		T
No. 7 South Carolina State $^	4	–	1	–	0	9	–	3	–	0
Florida A&M	4	–	1	–	0	6	–	5	–	0
Bethune–Cookman	3	–	2	–	0	5	–	5	–	0
Howard	2	–	3	–	0	6	–	5	–	0
Delaware State	2	–	3	–	0	4	–	7	–	0
North Carolina A&T	0	–	5	–	0	2	–	8	–	0
$ – Conference champion; ^ – NCAA Division I-AA playoff participant; Rankings from NCAA Division I-AA Football Committee poll

1983 Mid-Eastern Athletic Conference football standings
	Conf.					Overall
Team	W		L		T	W		L		T
No. 18 South Carolina State $	4	–	0	–	0	7	–	3	–	0
Delaware State	3	–	1	–	0	7	–	3	–	1
Bethune–Cookman	1	–	3	–	0	4	–	4	–	1
North Carolina A&T	1	–	3	–	0	3	–	7	–	1
Howard	1	–	3	–	0	1	–	9	–	0
Florida A&M	0	–	0	–	0	7	–	4	–	0
$ – Conference champion; ^ – NCAA Division I-AA playoff participant; Florida A&M games did not count as conference games; Rankings from NCAA Division I-AA Football Committee poll

1984 Mid-Eastern Athletic Conference football standings
	Conf.					Overall
Team	W		L		T	W		L		T
Bethune–Cookman $	4	–	0	–	0	7	–	3	–	0
Delaware State	3	–	1	–	0	8	–	2	–	0
South Carolina State	2	–	2	–	0	4	–	6	–	1
North Carolina A&T	1	–	3	–	0	2	–	8	–	0
Howard	0	–	4	–	0	2	–	8	–	0
Morgan State	0	–	0	–	0	0	–	11	–	0
$ – Conference champion; Morgan State games did not count as conference games. Morgan State was NCAA Division II. All the other teams were classified as I-AA.

1985 Mid-Eastern Athletic Conference football standings
	Conf.					Overall
Team	W		L		T	W		L		T
No. T–12 Delaware State $	4	–	0	–	0	9	–	2	–	0
Bethune–Cookman	3	–	1	–	0	6	–	4	–	0
South Carolina State	2	–	2	–	0	5	–	6	–	0
North Carolina A&T	1	–	3	–	0	6	–	5	–	0
Howard	0	–	4	–	0	4	–	7	–	0
Morgan State	0	–	0	–	0	0	–	9	–	0
$ – Conference champion; Morgan State games did not count as conference games. Morgan State was classified as NCAA Division II. All the other teams were I-AA.; Rankings from NCAA Division I-AA Football Committee poll

1986 Mid-Eastern Athletic Conference football standings
	Conf.					Overall
Team	W		L		T	W		L		T
No. 20 North Carolina A&T $^	4	–	1	–	0	9	–	3	–	0
Howard	3	–	2	–	0	8	–	3	–	0
Delaware State	3	–	2	–	0	7	–	4	–	0
South Carolina State	3	–	2	–	0	5	–	6	–	0
Bethune–Cookman	2	–	3	–	0	3	–	8	–	0
Morgan State	0	–	5	–	0	1	–	9	–	0
$ – Conference champion; ^ – NCAA Division I-AA playoff participant; Rankings from NCAA Division I-AA Football Committee poll

1987 Mid-Eastern Athletic Conference football standings
	Conf.					Overall
Team	W		L		T	W		L		T
No. 20 Delaware State $	5	–	0	–	0	9	–	1	–	0
No. 18 Howard	4	–	1	–	0	8	–	2	–	0
South Carolina State	3	–	2	–	0	6	–	5	–	0
Bethune–Cookman	2	–	3	–	0	4	–	7	–	0
North Carolina A&T	1	–	4	–	0	3	–	8	–	0
Morgan State	0	–	5	–	0	1	–	9	–	0
$ – Conference champion; Records adjusted for Howard and Arkansas Pine–Bluff forfeits to Delaware State; Rankings from NCAA Division I-AA Football Committee poll

1988 Mid-Eastern Athletic Conference football standings
	Conf.					Overall
Team	W		L		T	W		L		T
Bethune–Cookman $	4	–	2	–	0	5	–	6	–	0
No. 18 Florida A&M	4	–	2	–	0	6	–	4	–	1
Delaware State	4	–	2	–	0	5	–	5	–	0
Howard	3	–	3	–	0	7	–	4	–	0
South Carolina State	3	–	3	–	0	4	–	7	–	0
North Carolina A&T	2	–	4	–	0	2	–	9	–	0
Morgan State	0	–	6	–	0	1	–	10	–	0
$ – Conference champion; Both Delaware State and Florida A&M received forfeit losses for the same game. Bethune–Cookman was awarded the conference title, although the MEAC website lists Bethune, Delaware State, and Florida A&M as co-champions.; Rankings from NCAA Division I-AA Football Committee poll

1989 Mid-Eastern Athletic Conference football standings
	Conf.					Overall
Team	W		L		T	W		L		T
Delaware State $	5	–	1	–	0	7	–	4	–	0
Howard	4	–	2	–	0	8	–	3	–	0
Florida A&M	3	–	3	–	0	6	–	5	–	0
Bethune–Cookman	3	–	3	–	0	5	–	5	–	0
South Carolina State	3	–	3	–	0	5	–	6	–	0
North Carolina A&T	2	–	4	–	0	5	–	6	–	0
Morgan State	1	–	5	–	0	3	–	7	–	1
$ – Conference champion

1990 Mid-Eastern Athletic Conference football standings
	Conf.					Overall
Team	W		L		T	W		L		T
Florida A&M $	6	–	0	–	0	7	–	4	–	0
No. T–19 North Carolina A&T	5	–	1	–	0	9	–	2	–	0
Delaware State	4	–	2	–	0	7	–	3	–	0
Howard	3	–	3	–	0	6	–	5	–	0
South Carolina State	2	–	4	–	0	4	–	6	–	0
Bethune–Cookman	1	–	5	–	0	4	–	7	–	0
Morgan State	0	–	6	–	0	1	–	10	–	0
$ – Conference champion; Rankings from NCAA Division I-AA Football Committee poll

1991 Mid-Eastern Athletic Conference football standings
	Conf.					Overall
Team	W		L		T	W		L		T
Delaware State +	5	–	1	–	0	9	–	2	–	0
North Carolina A&T +	5	–	1	–	0	9	–	3	–	0
South Carolina State	3	–	3	–	0	7	–	4	–	0
Florida A&M	3	–	3	–	0	5	–	5	–	0
Bethune–Cookman	3	–	3	–	0	4	–	6	–	0
Howard	1	–	5	–	0	2	–	9	–	0
Morgan State	1	–	5	–	0	1	–	10	–	0
+ – Conference co-champions

1992 Mid-Eastern Athletic Conference football standings
	Conf.					Overall
Team	W		L		T	W		L		T
No. 17 North Carolina A&T $^	5	–	1	–	0	9	–	3	–	0
No. 15 Florida A&M	4	–	2	–	0	7	–	4	–	0
South Carolina State	4	–	2	–	0	7	–	4	–	0
Howard	3	–	3	–	0	7	–	4	–	0
Delaware State	3	–	3	–	0	6	–	5	–	0
Bethune–Cookman	2	–	4	–	0	4	–	7	–	0
Morgan State	0	–	6	–	0	2	–	9	–	0
$ – Conference champion; ^ – NCAA Division I-AA playoff participant; Rankings from NCAA Division I-AA Football Committee poll

1993 Mid-Eastern Athletic Conference football standings
	Conf.					Overall
Team	W		L		T	W		L		T
No. 8 Howard $^	6	–	0	–	0	11	–	1	–	0
South Carolina State	4	–	2	–	0	8	–	3	–	0
Delaware State	4	–	2	–	0	6	–	5	–	0
No. 21 North Carolina A&T	3	–	3	–	0	8	–	3	–	0
Florida A&M	3	–	3	–	0	5	–	6	–	0
Morgan State	1	–	5	–	0	3	–	8	–	0
Bethune–Cookman	0	–	6	–	0	1	–	10	–	0
$ – Conference champion; ^ – NCAA Division I-AA playoff participant; Rankings from The Sports Network poll

1994 Mid-Eastern Athletic Conference football standings
	Conf.					Overall
Team	W		L		T	W		L		T
No. 22 South Carolina State $	6	–	0	–	0	10	–	2	–	0
Delaware State	4	–	2	–	0	7	–	4	–	0
North Carolina A&T	3	–	3	–	0	6	–	5	–	0
Bethune–Cookman	3	–	3	–	0	5	–	6	–	0
Florida A&M	2	–	4	–	0	6	–	5	–	0
Morgan State	2	–	4	–	0	3	–	8	–	0
Howard	1	–	5	–	0	4	–	7	–	0
$ – Conference champion; Rankings from The Sports Network poll

1995 Mid-Eastern Athletic Conference football standings
	Conf.					Overall
Team	W		L		T	W		L		T
No. 16 Florida A&M $	6	–	0	–	0	9	–	3	–	0
Delaware State	5	–	1	–	0	6	–	5	–	0
South Carolina State	4	–	2	–	0	6	–	4	–	0
Howard	2	–	4	–	0	6	–	5	–	0
North Carolina A&T	2	–	4	–	0	4	–	7	–	0
Bethune–Cookman	2	–	4	–	0	3	–	8	–	0
Morgan State	0	–	6	–	0	1	–	10	–	0
$ – Conference champion; Rankings from The Sports Network poll

1996 Mid-Eastern Athletic Conference football standings
	Conf.			Overall
Team	W		L	W		L
No. 12 Florida A&M $^	7	–	0	9	–	3
No. 20 Howard	6	–	1	10	–	2
North Carolina A&T	4	–	3	8	–	3
South Carolina State	4	–	3	4	–	6
Hampton	3	–	4	5	–	6
Morgan State	2	–	5	4	–	7
Delaware State	2	–	5	3	–	8
Bethune–Cookman	0	–	7	2	–	9
$ – Conference champion; ^ – NCAA Division I-AA playoff participant; Rankings from The Sports Network poll

1997 Mid-Eastern Athletic Conference football standings
	Conf.			Overall
Team	W		L	W		L
No. 9 Hampton $^	7	–	0	10	–	2
No. 22 South Carolina State	5	–	2	9	–	2
No. 10 Florida A&M ^	5	–	2	9	–	3
Howard	4	–	3	7	–	4
North Carolina A&T	3	–	4	7	–	4
Morgan State	2	–	5	3	–	7
Bethune–Cookman	1	–	6	4	–	7
Delaware State	1	–	6	3	–	8
Norfolk State	0	–	0	3	–	7
$ – Conference champion; ^ – NCAA Division I-AA playoff participant; Norfolk State games did not count as conference games.; Rankings from The Sports Network poll

1998 Mid-Eastern Athletic Conference football standings
	Conf.			Overall
Team	W		L	W		L
No. 5 Florida A&M +^	7	–	1	11	–	2
No. 11 Hampton +^	7	–	1	9	–	3
No. 18 Bethune–Cookman	6	–	2	8	–	3
North Carolina A&T	5	–	3	8	–	3
Howard	5	–	3	7	–	4
South Carolina State	3	–	5	5	–	6
Norfolk State	2	–	6	2	–	9
Morgan State	1	–	7	1	–	10
Delaware State	0	–	8	0	–	11
+ – Conference co-champions; ^ – NCAA Division I-AA playoff participant; Rankings from The Sports Network poll

1999 Mid-Eastern Athletic Conference football standings
	Conf.			Overall
Team	W		L	W		L
No. 10 North Carolina A&T $^	8	–	0	11	–	2
No. 4 Florida A&M ^	7	–	1	11	–	4
Hampton	5	–	3	8	–	4
Bethune–Cookman	4	–	4	7	–	4
Howard	4	–	4	5	–	6
Delaware State	4	–	4	4	–	7
South Carolina State	2	–	5	4	–	6
Norfolk State	1	–	7	2	–	9
Morgan State	0	–	7	2	–	8
$ – Conference champion; ^ – NCAA Division I-AA playoff participant; Rankings from The Sports Network poll

2000 Mid-Eastern Athletic Conference football standings
	Conf.			Overall
Team	W		L	W		L
No. 14 Florida A&M $^	7	–	1	9	–	3
No. 20 Bethune–Cookman	6	–	2	9	–	2
No. 21 North Carolina A&T	6	–	2	8	–	3
Delaware State	5	–	3	7	–	4
Hampton	5	–	3	7	–	4
Howard	3	–	5	3	–	8
Norfolk State	2	–	6	3	–	8
South Carolina State	2	–	6	3	–	8
Morgan State	0	–	8	1	–	10
$ – Conference champion; ^ – NCAA Division I-AA playoff participant; Rankings from The Sports Network poll

2001 Mid-Eastern Athletic Conference football standings
	Conf.			Overall
Team	W		L	W		L
No. 22 Florida A&M $^	7	–	1	7	–	4
Hampton	6	–	2	7	–	4
North Carolina A&T	5	–	3	8	–	3
Bethune–Cookman	5	–	3	6	–	4
South Carolina State	5	–	3	6	–	5
Delaware State	3	–	5	5	–	6
Norfolk State	3	–	5	5	–	6
Howard	1	–	7	2	–	9
Morgan State	1	–	7	2	–	9
$ – Conference champion; ^ – NCAA Division I-AA playoff participant; Rankings from The Sports Network poll

2002 Mid-Eastern Athletic Conference football standings
	Conf.			Overall
Team	W		L	W		L
No. 15 Bethune–Cookman $^	7	–	1	11	–	2
Florida A&M	5	–	3	7	–	5
Hampton	5	–	3	7	–	5
Morgan State	5	–	3	7	–	5
South Carolina State	4	–	4	7	–	5
Howard	4	–	4	6	–	5
Norfolk State	2	–	6	5	–	6
North Carolina A&T	2	–	6	4	–	8
Delaware State	2	–	6	4	–	8
$ – Conference champion; ^ – NCAA Division I-AA playoff participant; Rankings from The Sports Network poll

2003 Mid-Eastern Athletic Conference football standings
	Conf.			Overall
Team	W		L	W		L
No. 16 North Carolina A&T $^	7	–	1	10	–	3
No. 15 Bethune–Cookman ^	6	–	2	9	–	3
South Carolina State	5	–	2	8	–	4
Hampton	5	–	2	7	–	4
Morgan State	4	–	3	6	–	5
Florida A&M	3	–	4	6	–	6
Howard	2	–	5	4	–	7
Delaware State	1	–	6	1	–	10
Norfolk State	0	–	8	1	–	11
$ – Conference champion; ^ – NCAA Division I-AA playoff participant; Rankings from The Sports Network poll

2004 Mid-Eastern Athletic Conference football standings
	Conf.			Overall
Team	W		L	W		L
No. 12 Hampton +^	6	–	1	10	–	2
No. 22 South Carolina State +	6	–	1	9	–	2
Bethune–Cookman	4	–	3	6	–	4
Delaware State	4	–	3	4	–	7
Howard	3	–	4	6	–	5
Morgan State	3	–	4	5	–	6
North Carolina A&T	1	–	6	3	–	8
Norfolk State	1	–	6	1	–	8
+ – Conference co-champions; ^ – NCAA Division I-AA playoff participant; Rankings from The Sports Network poll

2005 Mid-Eastern Athletic Conference football standings
	Conf.			Overall
Team	W		L	W		L
No. 10 Hampton $^	8	–	0	11	–	1
No. 20 South Carolina State	7	–	1	9	–	2
Delaware State	6	–	2	7	–	4
Florida A&M	5	–	3	6	–	5
Bethune–Cookman	4	–	4	7	–	4
Norfolk State	2	–	6	4	–	7
North Carolina A&T	2	–	6	3	–	8
Howard	1	–	7	4	–	7
Morgan State	1	–	7	2	–	9
$ – Conference champion; ^ – NCAA Division I-AA playoff participant; Rankings from The Sports Network poll

2006 Mid-Eastern Athletic Conference football standings
	Conf.			Overall
Team	W		L	W		L
No. 11 Hampton $^	7	–	1	10	–	2
Delaware State	6	–	2	8	–	3
South Carolina State	6	–	2	7	–	4
Florida A&M	5	–	3	7	–	4
Howard	4	–	4	5	–	6
Morgan State	4	–	4	5	–	6
Bethune–Cookman	3	–	5	5	–	6
Norfolk State	1	–	7	4	–	7
North Carolina A&T	0	–	8	0	–	11
$ – Conference champion; ^ – FCS playoff participant; Rankings from The Sports Network poll

2007 Mid-Eastern Athletic Conference football standings
	Conf.			Overall
Team	W		L	W		L
No. 15 Delaware State $^	9	–	0	10	–	2
Norfolk State	7	–	2	8	–	3
South Carolina State	7	–	2	7	–	4
Hampton	5	–	4	6	–	5
Winston-Salem State	5	–	4	6	–	5
Morgan State	4	–	5	5	–	6
Bethune–Cookman	3	–	6	5	–	6
Howard	3	–	6	4	–	7
Florida A&M	2	–	7	3	–	8
North Carolina A&T	0	–	9	0	–	11
$ – Conference champion; ^ – FCS playoff participant; Rankings from The Sports Network poll

2008 Mid-Eastern Athletic Conference football standings
	Conf.			Overall
Team	W		L	W		L
No. 13 South Carolina State $^	8	–	0	10	–	2
Florida A&M	5	–	3	9	–	3
Bethune–Cookman	5	–	3	8	–	3
Hampton	5	–	3	6	–	5
Delaware State	5	–	3	5	–	6
Morgan State	4	–	4	6	–	6
Norfolk State	3	–	5	5	–	7
North Carolina A&T	1	–	7	3	–	9
Howard	0	–	8	1	–	10
Winston-Salem State *	0	–	0	3	–	8
$ – Conference champion; ^ – FCS playoff participant; * – Ineligible for conference championship; Rankings from The Sports Network poll

2009 Mid-Eastern Athletic Conference football standings
	Conf.			Overall
Team	W		L	W		L
No. 8 South Carolina State $^	7	–	1	10	–	2
No. 23 Florida A&M	6	–	2	8	–	3
Norfolk State	5	–	3	7	–	4
Morgan State	4	–	4	6	–	5
Bethune–Cookman	4	–	4	5	–	6
Delaware State	3	–	4	4	–	6
Hampton	3	–	5	5	–	6
North Carolina A&T	2	–	5	4	–	6
Howard	0	–	8	2	–	9
$ – Conference champion; ^ – FCS playoff participant; Rankings from The Sports Network poll

2010 Mid-Eastern Athletic Conference football standings
	Conf.			Overall
Team	W		L	W		L
No. 15 Bethune–Cookman +^	7	–	1	10	–	2
No. 16 South Carolina State +^	7	–	1	9	–	3
Florida A&M +	7	–	1	8	–	3
Hampton	5	–	3	6	–	5
Norfolk State	4	–	4	6	–	5
Morgan State	3	–	5	4	–	7
Delaware State	2	–	6	3	–	8
North Carolina A&T	1	–	7	1	–	10
Howard	0	–	8	1	–	10
North Carolina Central *	0	–	0	3	–	8
Savannah State *	0	–	0	1	–	10
+ – Conference co-champions; ^ – FCS playoff participant; * Not eligible for conference championship; Rankings from The Sports Network poll

2011 Mid-Eastern Athletic Conference football standings
	Conf.			Overall
Team	W		L	W		L
No. 19 Norfolk State $^	7	–	1	9	–	3
Bethune–Cookman	6	–	2	8	–	3
South Carolina State	6	–	2	7	–	4
Florida A&M	5	–	3	7	–	4
Hampton	5	–	3	7	–	4
Howard	4	–	4	5	–	6
Morgan State	4	–	4	5	–	6
North Carolina A&T	4	–	4	5	–	6
Delaware State	1	–	7	3	–	8
North Carolina Central	1	–	7	2	–	9
Savannah State	1	–	7	1	–	10
$ – Conference champion; ^ – FCS playoff participant; Rankings from The Sports Network poll

2012 Mid-Eastern Athletic Conference football standings
	Conf.			Overall
Team	W		L	W		L
No. 22 Bethune–Cookman $^	8	–	0	9	–	3
Howard	6	–	2	7	–	4
North Carolina A&T	5	–	3	7	–	4
North Carolina Central	5	–	3	6	–	5
Delaware State	5	–	3	6	–	5
South Carolina State	4	–	4	5	–	6
Florida A&M	4	–	4	4	–	7
Hampton	3	–	5	3	–	7
Norfolk State	2	–	6	4	–	7
Morgan State	2	–	6	3	–	8
Savannah State	0	–	8	1	–	10
$ – Conference champion; ^ – FCS playoff participant; Rankings from The Sports Network poll

2013 Mid-Eastern Athletic Conference football standings
	Conf.			Overall
Team	W		L	W		L
No. 16 Bethune–Cookman +^	7	–	1	10	–	3
No. 25 South Carolina State +^	7	–	1	9	–	4
Morgan State	5	–	3	5	–	7
Delaware State	5	–	3	5	–	6
North Carolina A&T	4	–	4	7	–	4
Howard	4	–	4	6	–	6
Hampton	4	–	4	4	–	8
North Carolina Central	3	–	5	5	–	7
Norfolk State	3	–	5	3	–	9
Florida A&M	2	–	6	3	–	9
Savannah State	0	–	8	1	–	11
+ – Conference co-champions; ^ – FCS playoff participant; Savannah State ineligible for FCS playoffs due to Academic Progress Rate sanctions; Rankings from The Sports Network poll

2014 Mid-Eastern Athletic Conference football standings
	Conf.			Overall
Team	W		L	W		L
No. 23 Bethune–Cookman +	6	–	2	9	–	3
North Carolina A&T +	6	–	2	9	–	3
South Carolina State +	6	–	2	8	–	4
North Carolina Central +	6	–	2	7	–	5
Morgan State +^	6	–	2	7	–	6
Norfolk State	4	–	4	4	–	8
Howard	3	–	5	5	–	7
Florida A&M *	3	–	5	3	–	9
Hampton	2	–	6	3	–	9
Delaware State	2	–	6	2	–	10
Savannah State *	0	–	8	0	–	12
+ – Conference co-champions; ^ – FCS playoff participant; * Florida A&M and Savannah State ineligible for FCS Playoffs due to APR violations; Rankings from The Sports Network poll

2015 Mid-Eastern Athletic Conference football standings
	Conf.			Overall
Team	W		L	W		L
No. 21 North Carolina A&T +	7	–	1	10	–	2
Bethune–Cookman +	7	–	1	9	–	2
North Carolina Central +	7	–	1	8	–	3
South Carolina State	6	–	2	7	–	4
Hampton	5	–	3	6	–	5
Morgan State	4	–	4	4	–	6
Norfolk State	4	–	4	4	–	7
Savannah State *	1	–	7	1	–	9
Delaware State	1	–	7	1	–	10
Florida A&M *	1	–	7	1	–	10
Howard	1	–	7	1	–	10
+ – Conference co-champions; Florida A&M and Savannah State ineligible for postseason due to APR violations; Rankings from STATS Poll

2016 Mid-Eastern Athletic Conference football standings
	Conf.			Overall
Team	W		L	W		L
No. 22 North Carolina Central $	8	–	0	9	–	3
No. 20 North Carolina A&T ^	7	–	1	9	–	3
Hampton	5	–	3	5	–	6
South Carolina State	5	–	3	5	–	6
Bethune–Cookman	4	–	4	4	–	6
Florida A&M *	4	–	4	4	–	7
Norfolk State	3	–	5	4	–	7
Savannah State *	3	–	5	3	–	7
Morgan State *	3	–	5	3	–	8
Howard *	2	–	6	2	–	9
Delaware State	0	–	8	0	–	11
$ – Conference champion; ^ – FCS playoff participant; * Florida A&M, Howard, Morgan State, and Savannah State ineligible for postseason due to APR violations; Rankings from STATS Poll

2017 Mid-Eastern Athletic Conference football standings
	Conf.			Overall
Team	W		L	W		L
No. 7 North Carolina A&T $	8	–	0	12	–	0
Howard	6	–	2	7	–	4
Bethune–Cookman	6	–	2	7	–	4
North Carolina Central	5	–	3	7	–	4
Hampton	5	–	3	6	–	5
Norfolk State	4	–	4	4	–	7
Savannah State *	3	–	5	3	–	8
South Carolina State	2	–	6	3	–	7
Florida A&M *	2	–	6	3	–	8
Delaware State	2	–	6	2	–	9
Morgan State *	1	–	7	1	–	10
$ – Conference champion; * Florida A&M, Morgan State and Savannah State ineligible for postseason due to APR violations; Rankings from STATS Poll

2018 Mid-Eastern Athletic Conference football standings
	Conf.			Overall
Team	W		L	W		L
No. 12 North Carolina A&T $	6	–	1	9	–	2
Bethune–Cookman	5	–	2	7	–	5
Florida A&M	5	–	2	6	–	5
South Carolina State	4	–	3	5	–	6
Howard	4	–	3	4	–	6
North Carolina Central	3	–	4	5	–	6
Morgan State	3	–	4	4	–	7
Norfolk State	2	–	5	4	–	7
Delaware State	2	–	5	3	–	8
Savannah State	1	–	6	2	–	8
$ – Conference champion; Rankings from STATS Poll

2019 Mid-Eastern Athletic Conference football standings
	Conf.			Overall
Team	W		L	W		L
No. 24 Florida A&M *	7	–	1	9	–	2
No. 20 North Carolina A&T +	6	–	2	9	–	3
South Carolina State +	6	–	2	8	–	3
Bethune–Cookman	5	–	3	7	–	4
Norfolk State	4	–	4	5	–	7
North Carolina Central	3	–	5	4	–	8
Howard	2	–	6	2	–	10
Morgan State	2	–	6	3	–	9
Delaware State	1	–	7	2	–	10
+ – Conference co-champions; * Florida A&M ineligible for conference title due to NCAA sanctions; Rankings from STATS Poll

2020 Mid-Eastern Athletic Conference football standings
	Conf.			Overall
Team	W		L	W		L
North Division
Delaware State	2	–	2	2	–	3
Howard*	0	–	2	0	–	2
South Division
South Carolina State	2	–	0	3	–	1
Notes: Due to COVID-19, the Mid-Eastern Athletic suspended the fall 2020 football season. Florida A&M, Bethune–Cookman, North Carolina Central, North Carolina A&T, Morgan State, and Norfolk State opted out of the spring season. The MEAC suspended the spring season on February 11, due to only having three schools playing in the spring. * – Ineligible for FCS postseason play due to NCAA sanctions; Rankings from STATS Poll

2021 Mid-Eastern Athletic Conference football standings
	Conf.			Overall
Team	W		L	W		L
South Carolina State $	5	–	0	7	–	5
North Carolina Central	4	–	1	6	–	5
Delaware State	2	–	3	5	–	6
Norfolk State	2	–	3	6	–	5
Howard	1	–	4	3	–	8
Morgan State	1	–	4	2	–	9
$ – Conference champion

2022 Mid-Eastern Athletic Conference football standings
	Conf.			Overall
Team	W		L	W		L
North Carolina Central +	4	–	1	10	–	2
Howard +	4	–	1	5	–	6
Delaware State	2	–	3	5	–	6
Morgan State	2	–	3	4	–	7
Norfolk State	2	–	3	2	–	9
South Carolina State	1	–	4	3	–	8
+ – Conference co-champions; Rankings from STATS Poll

2023 Mid-Eastern Athletic Conference football standings
	Conf.			Overall
Team	W		L	W		L
Howard +	4	–	1	6	–	6
No. 20 North Carolina Central +^	4	–	1	9	–	3
South Carolina State	3	–	2	5	–	6
Morgan State	3	–	2	4	–	6
Norfolk State	1	–	4	3	–	8
Delaware State	0	–	5	1	–	10
+ – Conference co-champions; ^ – FCS playoff participant; Rankings from STATS Poll

2024 Mid-Eastern Athletic Conference football standings
	Conf.			Overall
Team	W		L	W		L
No. 24 South Carolina State $	5	–	0	9	–	3
North Carolina Central	4	–	1	8	–	3
Morgan State	3	–	2	6	–	6
Norfolk State	2	–	3	4	–	8
Howard	1	–	4	4	–	8
Delaware State	0	–	5	1	–	11
$ – Conference champion; Rankings from STATS Poll

2025 Mid-Eastern Athletic Conference football standings
	Conf.			Overall
Team	W		L	W		L
No. 21 South Carolina State $	5	–	0	10	–	3
Delaware State	4	–	1	8	–	4
North Carolina Central	3	–	2	8	–	4
Howard	2	–	3	5	–	7
Morgan State	1	–	4	4	–	8
Norfolk State	0	–	5	1	–	11
$ – Conference champion; Rankings from STATS Poll

2026 Mid-Eastern Athletic Conference football standings
	Conf.			Overall
Team	W		L	W		L
Delaware State	0	–	0	0	–	0
Howard	0	–	0	0	–	0
Morgan State	0	–	0	0	–	0
Norfolk State	0	–	0	0	–	0
North Carolina Central	0	–	0	0	–	0
South Carolina State	0	–	0	0	–	0
Rankings from STATS Poll
