= List of Howard Bison football seasons =

The following is a list of Howard Bison football seasons for the football team that has represented Howard University in NCAA competition.

== Results ==
Year	Coach	Overall	Conference	Standing	Bowl/playoffs	Rank^{#}
Charles Cook (Independent) (1893–1900)
1893	Charles Cook	2–0				
1894	Charles Cook	0–1–1				
1895	Charles Cook	4–1–1				
1896	No Team					
1897	Charles Cook	5–0				
1898	No Team					
1899	Charles Cook	3–0				
1900	Charles Cook	2–0–1				
Charles Cook:		16–2–3				
"Cap" Washington (Independent) (1901–1906)
1901	"Cap" Washington	4–0				
1902	"Cap" Washington	1–0				
1903	"Cap" Washington	2–0				
1904	"Cap" Washington	1–1–1				
1905	"Cap" Washington	1–1				
1906	"Cap" Washington	2–1–2				
"Cap" Washington:		11–3–3				
"Heine" Bullock (Independent) (1907)
1907	"Heine" Bullock	3–1				
"Heine" Bullock:		3–1				
Merton Robinson (1st stint) (Independent) (1908)
1908	Merton Robinson	5–1–1				
Merton Robinson:		5–1–1				
Ernest Marshall (Independent) (1909–1911)
1909	Ernest Marshall	4–0				
1910	Ernest Marshall	5–0				
1911	Ernest Marshall	3–0–1				
Ernest Marshall (Central Intercollegiate Athletics Association) (1912–1916)
1912	Ernest Marshall	5–0	2–0	1st		
1913	Ernest Marshall	3–1–1	2–1	2nd		
1914	Ernest Marshall	4–1	1–0	1st		
1915	Ernest Marshall	2–1	1–1			
1916	Ernest Marshall	5–1–2	1–1			
Ernest Marshall:		31–4–4	7–3			
W.H. Beckett (Central Intercollegiate Athletics Association) (1917)
1917	W.H. Beckett	0–4	0–2	4th		
W.H. Beckett:		0–4	0–2			
Merton Robinson (2nd stint) (Central Intercollegiate Athletics Association) (1918–1919)
1918	Merton Robinson	0–3	0–2			
1919	Merton Robinson	3–0–3	2–0–1			
Merton Robinson:		3–3–3	2–2–1			
Edward Morrison (1st stint) (Central Intercollegiate Athletics Association) (1920–1922)
1920	Edward Morrison	7–0	4–0	1st		
1921	Edward Morrison	7–1	3–0			
1922	Edward Morrison	4–2	1–1			
Edward Morrison:		18–3	8–1			
Louis L. Watson (1st stint) (Central Intercollegiate Athletics Association) (1923)
1923	Louis L. Watson	7–0–1	2–0			
Louis L. Watson:		7–0–1	2–0			
Edward Morrison (2nd stint) (Central Intercollegiate Athletics Association) (1924)
1924	Edward Morrison	1–2–3				
Edward Morrison:		1–2–3				
Louis L. Watson (2nd stint) (Central Intercollegiate Athletics Association) (1923)
1925	Louis L. Watson	6–0–2				
1926	Louis L. Watson	7–0				
1927	Louis L. Watson	3–3–2				
Louis L. Watson:		16–3–4				
Edward Morrison (3rd stint) (Central Intercollegiate Athletics Association) (1928)
1928	Edward Morrison	6–1–2				
Edward Morrison:		6–1–2				
Thomas Verdell (Central Intercollegiate Athletics Association) (1929–1933)
1929	Thomas Verdell	0–7–2				
1930	Thomas Verdell	4–3–1				
1931	Thomas Verdell	3–5				
1932	Thomas Verdell	4–4				
1933	Thomas Verdell	3–5			L Florida A&M Orange Blossom Classic	
Thomas Verdell:		14–24–3				
Charles West (Central Intercollegiate Athletics Association) (1934–1935)
1934	Charles West	4–2–2				
1935	Charles West	3–6				
Charles West:		7–8–2				
Harry R. Payne (Central Intercollegiate Athletics Association) (1936–1940)
1936	Harry R. Payne	1–6				
1937	Harry R. Payne	2–5–1				
1938	Harry R. Payne	4–5				
1939	Harry R. Payne	2–6				
1940	Harry R. Payne	1–7				
Harry R. Payne:		10–29–1				
James Rowland (Central Intercollegiate Athletics Association) (1941–1942)
1941	James Rowland	3–3				
1942	James Rowland	1–4–2				
James Rowland:		4–7–2				
1943	No Team Due to WW2					
James Chambers (Central Intercollegiate Athletics Association) (1944)
1944	James Chambers	1–4				
James Chambers:		1–4				
Coach Unknown (Central Intercollegiate Athletics Association) (1945)
1945	Coach Unknown	4–4				
Edward L. Jackson (Central Intercollegiate Athletics Association) (1946–1952)
1946	Edward L. Jackson	6–3				
1947	Edward L. Jackson	6–2–1				
1948	Edward L. Jackson	7–2				
1949	Edward L. Jackson	6–3				
1950	Edward L. Jackson	5–4				
1951	Edward L. Jackson	5–4				
1952	Edward L. Jackson	6–2–1				
Edward L. Jackson:		41–20–2				
Thomas F. Johnson (Central Intercollegiate Athletics Association) (1953–1956)
1953	Thomas F. Johnson	3–5–1				
1954	Thomas F. Johnson	2–6–1				
1955	Thomas F. Johnson	3–6				
1956	Thomas F. Johnson	4–5				
Thomas F. Johnson:		12–22–2				
Robert M. White (Central Intercollegiate Athletics Association) (1957–1961)
1957	Robert M. White	3–7				
1958	Robert M. White	6–2–1				
1959	Robert M. White	3–5				
1960	Robert M. White	4–4				
1961	Robert M. White	1–8				
Robert M. White:		17–25–1				
Tillman R. Sease (1st stint) (Central Intercollegiate Athletics Association) (1962–1968)
1962	Tillman R. Sease	1–8				
1963	Tillman R. Sease	4–5				
1964	Tillman R. Sease	8–2				
1965	Tillman R. Sease	5–3				
1966	Tillman R. Sease	4–4				
1967	Tillman R. Sease	2–6				
1968	Tillman R. Sease	3–5				
Tillman R. Sease:		27–33				
John Organ (Central Intercollegiate Athletics Association) (1969)
1969	John Organ	3–6				
John Organ:		3–6				
Tillman R. Sease (2nd stint) (Central Intercollegiate Athletics Association) (1970)
1970	Tillman R. Sease	7–2				
Tillman R. Sease (2nd stint) (Mid-Eastern Athletic Conference) (1971–1972)
1971	Tillman R. Sease	4–5				
1972	Tillman R. Sease	6–4				
Tillman R. Sease:		17–11				
Edmund Wyche (Mid-Eastern Athletic Conference) (1973)
1973	Edmund Wyche	8–2				
Edmund Wyche:		8–2				
Douglas Porter (Mid-Eastern Athletic Conference) (1974–1978)
1974	Douglas Porter	8–2–1			L Florida A&M Orange Blossom Classic	
1975	Douglas Porter	8–3				
1976	Douglas Porter	5–5–1				
1977	Douglas Porter	5–5				
1978	Douglas Porter	4–6				
Douglas Porter:		30–21–2				
Floyd Keith (Mid-Eastern Athletic Conference) (1979–1982)
1979	Floyd Keith	5–6				
1980	Floyd Keith	6–2–2				
1981	Floyd Keith	6–4				
1982	Floyd Keith	6–5				
Floyd Keith:		23–17–2				
Joe Taylor (Mid-Eastern Athletic Conference) (1983)
1983	Joe Taylor	1–9				
Joe Taylor:		1–9				
Willie Jeffries (Mid-Eastern Athletic Conference) (1984–1988)
1984	Willie Jeffries	2–8				
1985	Willie Jeffries	4–7				
1986	Willie Jeffries	8–3				
1987	Willie Jeffries	0–10^{[A]}				
1988	Willie Jeffries	7–4				
Willie Jeffries:		21–32				
Steve Wilson (Mid-Eastern Athletic Conference) (1989–2001)
1989	Steve Wilson	8–3				
1990	Steve Wilson	6–5				
1991	Steve Wilson	2–9				
1992	Steve Wilson	7–4				
1993	Steve Wilson	11–1		1st	L Marshall NCAA Division I-AA First Round	
1994	Steve Wilson	4–7				
1995	Steve Wilson	6–5				
1996	Steve Wilson	10–2			W Southern Heritage Bowl	
1997	Steve Wilson	7–4				
1998	Steve Wilson	7–4				
1999	Steve Wilson	5–6				
2000	Steve Wilson	3–8				
2001	Steve Wilson	2–9				
Steve Wilson:		78–67				
Rayford T. Petty (1st stint) (Mid-Eastern Athletic Conference) (2002–2006)
2002	Rayford T. Petty	6–5	4–4	6th		
2003	Rayford T. Petty	4–7	2–5	6th		
2004	Rayford T. Petty	6–5	3–4	5th		
2005	Rayford T. Petty	4–7	1–7	8th		
2006	Rayford T. Petty	5–6	4–4	5th		
Rayford T. Petty:		25–30	14–24			
Carey Bailey (Mid-Eastern Athletic Conference) (2007–2010)
2007	Carey Bailey	4–7	2–6	7th		
2008	Carey Bailey	1–10	0–8	9th		
2009	Carey Bailey	2–9	0–8	9th		
2010	Carey Bailey	1–10	0–8	11th		
Carey Bailey:		8–36	2–30			
Gary Harrell (Mid-Eastern Athletic Conference) (2011–2016*)
2011	Gary Harrell	5–6	4–4	6th		
2012	Gary Harrell	7–4	6–2	2nd		
2014	Gary Harrell	5–7	3–5	7th		
2015	Gary Harrell	1–10	1–7	6th		
2016	Gary Harrell	2–9	2–6	10th		
Gary Harrell:		20–36	16–24			
Rayford T. Petty (2nd stint) (Mid-Eastern Athletic Conference) (2013)
2013	Rayford T. Petty	6–6	4–4	6th		
Rayford T. Petty^{[B]}:		6–6	4–4			
Mike London (Mid-Eastern Athletic Conference) (2017–2018)
2017	Mike London	7–4	6–2			
2018	Mike London	4–6	4–3			
Mike London:		11-10	10-5			
Ron Prince (First 9 Games) (Mid-Eastern Athletic Conference) (2019)
2019	Ron Prince (9 Games)	1-8	1-6			
Ron Prince:		1-8	1-6			
Aaron Kelton (Last 3 Games) (Mid-Eastern Athletic Conference) (2019)
2019	Aaron Kelton (3 Games)	1-2	1-2			
Aaron Kelton:		1-2	1-2			
Larry Scott (Mid-Eastern Athletic Conference) (2020–present)
2020	Larry Scott	0–2	0–2			
2021	Larry Scott	3–8	1–4	5th		
2022	Larry Scott	5–6	4–1	1st		
2023	Larry Scott	6–6	4–1	1st	L Florida A&M Rattlers Celebration Bowl	
2024	Larry Scott	4-8	1-4			
2025	Larry Scott	5-7	2-3	4th		
Larry Scott:		23–37	12–15			
Ted White (Mid-Eastern Athletic Conference) (2026–present)
2026	Ted White	4-5	1-1	5th		
Ted White:		4-5	1-1			
Total:		534–517–40				
National championship Conference title Conference division title or championship game berth
^{#}Post 1996 rankings from final Sports Network poll.
