= 2011 Morgan State Bears football team =

American college football season

2011 Morgan State Bears football
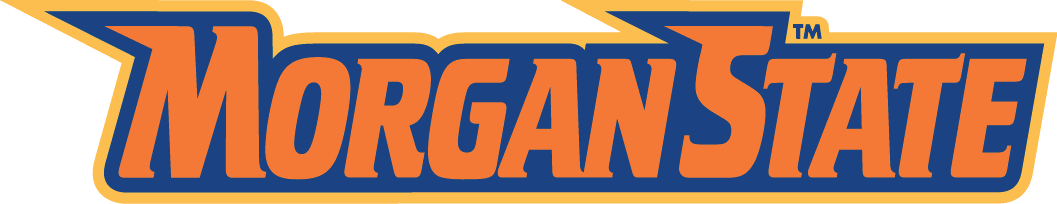
- Conference: Mid-Eastern Athletic Conference
- Record: 5–6 (4–4 MEAC)
- Head coach: Donald Hill-Eley (11th season)
- Offensive coordinator: Joseph Wright / William "B.T." Sherman
- Defensive coordinator: Herbert Parham / Alonzo Lee
- Home stadium: Hughes Stadium

2011 Mid-Eastern Athletic Conference football standings
	Conf.			Overall
Team	W		L	W		L
No. 19 Norfolk State $^	7	–	1	9	–	3
Bethune–Cookman	6	–	2	8	–	3
South Carolina State	6	–	2	7	–	4
Florida A&M	5	–	3	7	–	4
Hampton	5	–	3	7	–	4
Howard	4	–	4	5	–	6
Morgan State	4	–	4	5	–	6
North Carolina A&T	4	–	4	5	–	6
Delaware State	1	–	7	3	–	8
North Carolina Central	1	–	7	2	–	9
Savannah State	1	–	7	1	–	10
$ – Conference champion; ^ – FCS playoff participant; Rankings from The Sports Network poll

The 2011 Morgan State Bears football team represented Morgan State University in the 2011 NCAA Division I FCS football season. The Bears were led by 11th-year head coach Donald Hill-Eley and played their home games at Hughes Stadium. They were a member of the Mid-Eastern Athletic Conference (MEAC). Morgan State finished the season 5–6, 4–4 in MEAC play to finish in a tie for sixth place.

== Schedule ==
Date	Time	Opponent	Site	TV	Result	Attendance
September 3	7:00 pm	at Towson*	Johnny Unitas Stadium; Towson, MD (The Battle for Greater Baltimore)		L 3–42	9,759
September 10	7:00 pm	at Bowling Green*	Doyt Perry Stadium; Bowling Green, OH		L 13–58	15,206
September 17	1:00 pm	Robert Morris*	Hughes Stadium; Baltimore, MD		W 13–12	4,782
September 24	4:00 pm	vs. Howard	MetLife Stadium; East Rutherford, NJ (NY Urban League Classic, rivalry)	ESPNU	W 14–9	24,996
October 1	1:00 pm	North Carolina A&T	Hughes Stadium; Baltimore, MD		L 3–24	2,312
October 8	1:00 pm	Savannah State^{†}	Hughes Stadium; Baltimore, MD		W 44–17	14,356
October 15	4:00 pm	at North Carolina Central	O'Kelly–Riddick Stadium; Durham, NC		W 52–3	4,218
October 29	1:00 pm	at Delaware State	Alumni Stadium; Dover, DE		W 12–0	955
November 5	4:00 pm	at Bethune-Cookman	Municipal Stadium; Daytona Beach, FL		L 23–49	9,649
November 12	1:00 pm	Norfolk State	Hughes Stadium; Baltimore, MD		L 14–47	5,329
November 19	1:00 pm	at Hampton	Armstrong Stadium; Hampton, VA		L 18–42	2,356
*Non-conference game; ^{†}Homecoming; All times are in Eastern time
