= 2011 Florida A&M Rattlers football team =

American college football season

2011 Florida A&M Rattlers football
- Conference: Mid-Eastern Athletic Conference
- Record: 7–4 (5–3 MEAC)
- Head coach: Joe Taylor (4th season)
- Defensive coordinator: Earl Holmes (4th season)
- Home stadium: Bragg Memorial Stadium

2011 Mid-Eastern Athletic Conference football standings
| | Conf. | | | Overall |
| Team | W | | L | W | | L |
|---|---|---|---|---|---|---|
| No. 19 Norfolk State $^ | 7 | – | 1 | 9 | – | 3 |
| Bethune–Cookman | 6 | – | 2 | 8 | – | 3 |
| South Carolina State | 6 | – | 2 | 7 | – | 4 |
| Florida A&M | 5 | – | 3 | 7 | – | 4 |
| Hampton | 5 | – | 3 | 7 | – | 4 |
| Howard | 4 | – | 4 | 5 | – | 6 |
| Morgan State | 4 | – | 4 | 5 | – | 6 |
| North Carolina A&T | 4 | – | 4 | 5 | – | 6 |
| Delaware State | 1 | – | 7 | 3 | – | 8 |
| North Carolina Central | 1 | – | 7 | 2 | – | 9 |
| Savannah State | 1 | – | 7 | 1 | – | 10 |
$ – Conference champion; ^ – FCS playoff participant; Rankings from The Sports Network poll

The 2011 Florida A&M Rattlers football team represented Florida A&M University in the 2011 NCAA Division I FCS football season. The Rattlers were led by fourth year head coach Joe Taylor and played their home games at Bragg Memorial Stadium. They are a member of the Mid-Eastern Athletic Conference. They finished the season 7–4, 5–3 in MEAC play to finish in a tie for fourth place.

== Schedule ==
| Date | Time | Opponent | Site | TV | Result | Attendance |
|---|---|---|---|---|---|---|
| September 3 | 6:00 pm | Fort Valley State* | Bragg Memorial Stadium; Tallahassee, FL | | W 28–22 | 21,162 |
| September 10 | 6:00 pm | at Hampton | Armstrong Stadium; Hampton, VA | | L 17–23 | 4,356 |
| September 17 | 7:00 pm | at No. 20 (FBS) South Florida* | Raymond James Stadium; Tampa, FL | BHSN | L 17–70 | 50,128 |
| September 24 | 3:30 pm | vs. Southern* | Georgia Dome; Atlanta, GA (Atlanta Football Classic) | Versus | W 38–33 | 59,373 |
| October 1 | 6:00 pm | Delaware State | Bragg Memorial Stadium; Tallahassee, FL | | W 34–7 | 1,408 |
| October 8 | 3:00 pm | Howard^{†} | Bragg Memorial Stadium; Tallahassee, FL | | L 28–29 | 23,400 |
| October 15 | 7:00 pm | at Savannah State | Ted Wright Stadium; Savannah, GA | | W 47–7 | 4,356 |
| October 22 | 1:30 pm | at South Carolina State | Oliver C. Dawson Stadium; Orangeburg, SC | | W 27–24 | 17,153 |
| November 5 | 3:00 pm | North Carolina A&T | Bragg Memorial Stadium; Tallahassee, FL | | W 26–20 | 16,415 |
| November 12 | 2:00 pm | at North Carolina Central | O'Kelly–Riddick Stadium; Durham, NC | | W 31–10 | 7,711 |
| November 19 | 2:30 pm | vs. Bethune-Cookman | Citrus Bowl; Orlando, FL (Florida Classic) | ESPN Classic | L 16–26 | 60,218 |
*Non-conference game; ^{†}Homecoming; Rankings from The Sports Network Poll released prior to the game; All times are in Eastern time
