= 2011 Delaware State Hornets football team =

American college football season

2011 Delaware State Hornets football
- Conference: Mid-Eastern Athletic Conference
- Record: 3–8 (1–7 MEAC)
- Head coach: Kermit Blount (1st season)
- Offensive coordinator: Arrington Jones (1st season)
- Defensive coordinator: Mike Ketchum (1st season)
- Home stadium: Alumni Stadium

2011 Mid-Eastern Athletic Conference football standings
	Conf.			Overall
Team	W		L	W		L
No. 19 Norfolk State $^	7	–	1	9	–	3
Bethune–Cookman	6	–	2	8	–	3
South Carolina State	6	–	2	7	–	4
Florida A&M	5	–	3	7	–	4
Hampton	5	–	3	7	–	4
Howard	4	–	4	5	–	6
Morgan State	4	–	4	5	–	6
North Carolina A&T	4	–	4	5	–	6
Delaware State	1	–	7	3	–	8
North Carolina Central	1	–	7	2	–	9
Savannah State	1	–	7	1	–	10
$ – Conference champion; ^ – FCS playoff participant; Rankings from The Sports Network poll

The 2011 Delaware State Hornets football team represented Delaware State University as a member of the Mid-Eastern Athletic Conference (MEAC) in the 2011 NCAA Division I FCS football season. Led by first-year head coach Kermit Blount, the Hornets compiled an overall record of 3–8 with a mark of 1–7 in conference play, placing in a three-way tie for ninth at the bottom of the MEAC standings. Delaware State played home games at Alumni Stadium in Dover, Delaware.

== Schedule ==
Date	Time	Opponent	Site	Result	Attendance
September 3	1:30 pm	VMI*	Alumni Stadium; Dover, DE	W 24–21	6,209
September 10	6:00 pm	Shaw*	Alumni Stadium; Dover, DE	W 31–27	1,600
September 17	7:00 pm	at No. 7 Delaware*	Delaware Stadium; Newark, DE (Route 1 Rivalry)	L 0–45	18,011
September 24	2:00 pm	at No. 25 South Carolina State	Oliver C. Dawson Stadium; Orangeburg, SC	L 0–69	15,227
October 1	6:00 pm	at Florida A&M	Bragg Memorial Stadium; Tallahassee, FL	L 7–34	1,408
October 8	1:00 pm	Norfolk State	Alumni Stadium; Dover, DE	L 21–38	3,198
October 15	1:30 pm	at North Carolina A&T	Aggie Stadium; Greensboro, NC	L 24–42	19,454
October 29	1:00 pm	Morgan State^{†}	Alumni Stadium; Dover, DE	L 0–12	955
November 5	1:00 pm	North Carolina Central	Alumni Stadium; Dover, DE	L 7–14	1,795
November 12	1:00 pm	at Hampton	Armstrong Stadium; Hampton, VA	L 6–42	2,217
November 19	1:00 pm	Howard	Alumni Stadium; Dover, DE	W 39–36	1,405
*Non-conference game; ^{†}Homecoming; Rankings from The Sports Network Poll released prior to the game; All times are in Eastern time
