= 2011 Hampton Pirates football team =

American college football season

2011 Hampton Pirates football
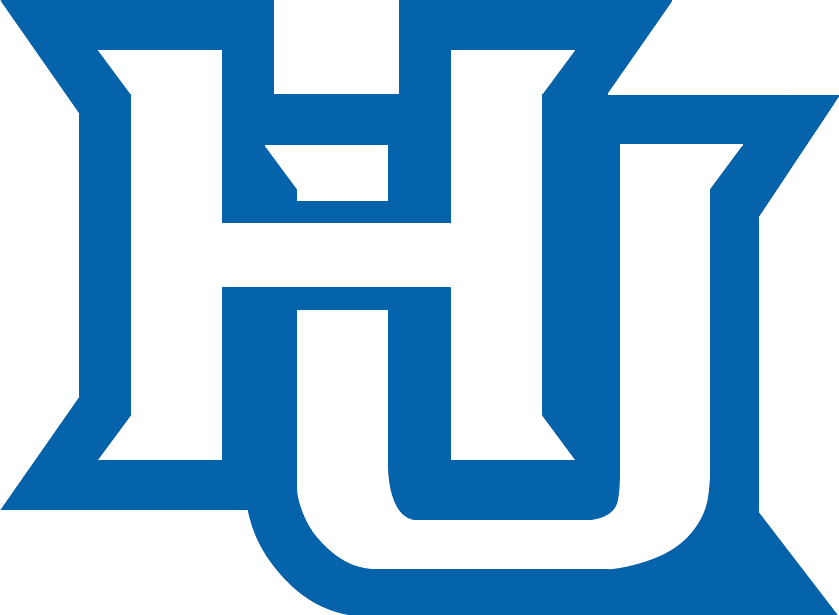
- Conference: Mid-Eastern Athletic Conference
- Record: 7–4 (5–3 MEAC)
- Head coach: Donovan Rose (3rd season)
- Offensive coordinator: Willie Snead III
- Defensive coordinator: Keith Goganious
- Home stadium: Armstrong Stadium

2011 Mid-Eastern Athletic Conference football standings
	Conf.			Overall
Team	W		L	W		L
No. 19 Norfolk State $^	7	–	1	9	–	3
Bethune–Cookman	6	–	2	8	–	3
South Carolina State	6	–	2	7	–	4
Florida A&M	5	–	3	7	–	4
Hampton	5	–	3	7	–	4
Howard	4	–	4	5	–	6
Morgan State	4	–	4	5	–	6
North Carolina A&T	4	–	4	5	–	6
Delaware State	1	–	7	3	–	8
North Carolina Central	1	–	7	2	–	9
Savannah State	1	–	7	1	–	10
$ – Conference champion; ^ – FCS playoff participant; Rankings from The Sports Network poll

The 2011 Hampton Pirates football team represented Hampton University in the 2011 NCAA Division I FCS football season. The Pirates were led by third-year head coach Donovan Rose and played their home games at Armstrong Stadium. They are a member of the Mid-Eastern Athletic Conference. They finished the season 7–4 overall and 5–3 in MEAC play to tie for fourth place.

== Schedule ==
Date	Time	Opponent	Site	TV	Result	Attendance
September 3	5:00 pm	vs. Alabama A&M*	Soldier Field; Chicago, IL (Chicago Football Classic)		W 21–20	35,653
September 9	6:00 pm	Florida A&M	Armstrong Stadium; Hampton, VA		W 23–17	4,356
September 17	6:00 pm	at Old Dominion*	Foreman Field; Norfolk, VA		L 42–45	19,818
September 22	7:30 pm	at Bethune-Cookman	Municipal Stadium; Daytona Beach, FL	ESPNU	L 31–35	4,765
October 8	1:00 pm	Princeton*	Armstrong Stadium; Hampton, VA		W 28–23	6,200
October 15	4:00 pm	at Norfolk State	William "Dick" Price Stadium; Norfolk, VA (Battle of the Bay)		L 24–34	19,556
October 22	2:00 pm	North Carolina Central^{†}	Armstrong Stadium; Hampton, VA		W 30–27 ^{OT}	8,147
October 29	2:00 pm	at Savannah State	Ted Wright Stadium; Savannah, GA		W 22–5	10,375
November 5	1:00 pm	Howard	Armstrong Stadium; Hampton, VA (The Real HU)		L 7–10	5,907
November 12	1:00 pm	Delaware State	Armstrong Stadium; Hampton, VA		W 42–6	2,217
November 19	1:00 pm	Morgan State	Armstrong Stadium; Hampton, VA		W 42–18	2,356
*Non-conference game; ^{†}Homecoming; All times are in Eastern time
