= 2011 South Carolina State Bulldogs football team =

American college football season

2011 South Carolina State Bulldogs football
- Conference: Mid-Eastern Athletic Conference
- Record: 7–4 (6–2 MEAC)
- Head coach: Oliver Pough (10th season)
- Defensive coordinator: Mike Adams
- Home stadium: Oliver C. Dawson Stadium

2011 Mid-Eastern Athletic Conference football standings
	Conf.			Overall
Team	W		L	W		L
No. 19 Norfolk State $^	7	–	1	9	–	3
Bethune–Cookman	6	–	2	8	–	3
South Carolina State	6	–	2	7	–	4
Florida A&M	5	–	3	7	–	4
Hampton	5	–	3	7	–	4
Howard	4	–	4	5	–	6
Morgan State	4	–	4	5	–	6
North Carolina A&T	4	–	4	5	–	6
Delaware State	1	–	7	3	–	8
North Carolina Central	1	–	7	2	–	9
Savannah State	1	–	7	1	–	10
$ – Conference champion; ^ – FCS playoff participant; Rankings from The Sports Network poll

The 2011 South Carolina State Bulldogs football team represented South Carolina State University in the 2011 NCAA Division I FCS football season. The Bulldogs were led by tenth year head coach Oliver Pough and played their home games at Oliver C. Dawson Stadium. They are a member of the Mid-Eastern Athletic Conference. They finished the season 7–4, 6–2 in MEAC play to finish in a tie for second place.

== Schedule ==
Date	Time	Opponent	Rank	Site	TV	Result	Attendance
September 1	7:00 pm	at Central Michigan*	No. 23	Kelly/Shorts Stadium; Mount Pleasant, MI		L 6–21	17,891
September 10	4:00 pm	at No. 25 Bethune–Cookman		Municipal Stadium; Daytona Beach, FL		W 26–18	9,463
September 17	3:30 pm	at Indiana*	No. 25	Memorial Stadium; Bloomington, IN	BTN	L 21–38	41,203
September 24	2:00 pm	Delaware State	No. 25	Oliver C. Dawson Stadium; Orangeburg, SC		W 69–0	15,227
October 1	4:00 pm	at Norfolk State	No. 22	William "Dick" Price Stadium; Norfolk, VA		L 14–17	10,137
October 8	1:30 pm	North Carolina Central^{†}		Oliver C. Dawson Stadium; Orangeburg, SC		W 49–38	22,181
October 15	1:30 pm	Georgia State*		Oliver C. Dawson Stadium; Orangeburg, SC		W 23–13	11,517
October 22	1:30 pm	Florida A&M		Oliver C. Dawson Stadium; Orangeburg, SC		L 24–27	17,153
October 29	1:00 pm	at Howard		William H. Greene Stadium; Washington, DC		W 31–0	1,057
November 12	1:30 pm	North Carolina A&T		Oliver C. Dawson Stadium; Orangeburg, SC		W 30–22	16,224
November 19	2:00 pm	at Savannah State		Ted Wright Stadium; Savannah, GA		W 20–10	4,069
*Non-conference game; ^{†}Homecoming; Rankings from The Sports Network Poll released prior to the game; All times are in Eastern time
