= 2011 Howard Bison football team =

American college football season

2011 Howard Bison football
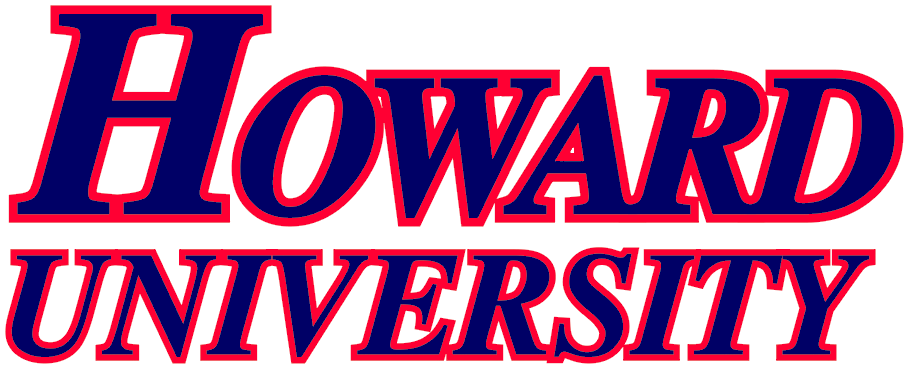
- Conference: Mid-Eastern Athletic Conference
- Record: 5–6 (4–4 MEAC)
- Head coach: Gary Harrell (1st season)
- Offensive coordinator: Ted White (1st season)
- Co-offensive coordinator: Chennis Berry (1st season)
- Defensive coordinator: Rayford Petty (1st season)
- Home stadium: William H. Greene Stadium

2011 Mid-Eastern Athletic Conference football standings
	Conf.			Overall
Team	W		L	W		L
No. 19 Norfolk State $^	7	–	1	9	–	3
Bethune–Cookman	6	–	2	8	–	3
South Carolina State	6	–	2	7	–	4
Florida A&M	5	–	3	7	–	4
Hampton	5	–	3	7	–	4
Howard	4	–	4	5	–	6
Morgan State	4	–	4	5	–	6
North Carolina A&T	4	–	4	5	–	6
Delaware State	1	–	7	3	–	8
North Carolina Central	1	–	7	2	–	9
Savannah State	1	–	7	1	–	10
$ – Conference champion; ^ – FCS playoff participant; Rankings from The Sports Network poll

The 2011 Howard Bison football team represented Howard University as a member of the Mid-Eastern Athletic Conference (MEAC) during the 2011 NCAA Division I FCS football season. Led by first-year head coach Gary Harrell, the Bison compiled an overall record of 5–6 with a mark of 4–4, placing in a three-way tie for sixth in the MEAC. Howard played home games at William H. Greene Stadium in Washington, D.C.

== Schedule ==
Date	Time	Opponent	Site	TV	Result	Attendance
September 4	12:00 pm	at Eastern Michigan*	Rynearson Stadium; Ypsilanti, MI		L 9–41	3,563
September 10	3:30 pm	vs. Morehouse*	Robert F. Kennedy Memorial Stadium; Washington, D.C. (Nation's Football Classic)		W 30–27	18,406
September 17	1:00 pm	Norfolk State	William H. Greene Stadium; Washington, DC		L 9–23	4,063
September 24	4:00 pm	vs. Morgan State	MetLife Stadium; East Rutherford, NJ (NY Urban League Classic, rivalry)	ESPNU	L 9–14	24,996
October 1	7:00 pm	at Savannah State	Ted Wright Stadium; Savannah, GA		W 34–14	5,635
October 8	3:00 pm	at Florida A&M	Bragg Memorial Stadium; Tallahassee, FL		W 29–28	23,400
October 15	1:00 pm	Georgetown*	William H. Greene Stadium; Washington, DC		L 3–21	1,891
October 22	1:00 pm	North Carolina A&T^{†}	William H. Greene Stadium; Washington, DC		W 35–28 ^{OT}	7,086
October 29	1:00 pm	South Carolina State	William H. Greene Stadium; Washington, DC		L 0–31	1,057
November 5	1:00 pm	at Hampton	Armstrong Stadium; Hampton, VA (The Real HU)		W 10–7	5,907
November 19	1:00 pm	at Delaware State	Alumni Stadium; Dover, DE		L 36–39	1,405
*Non-conference game; ^{†}Homecoming; All times are in Eastern time
