= 2011 Savannah State Tigers football team =

American college football season

2011 Savannah State Tigers football
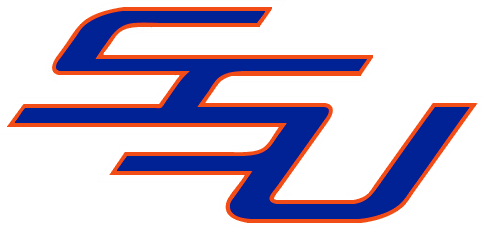
- Conference: Mid-Eastern Athletic Conference
- Record: 1–10 (1–7 MEAC)
- Head coach: Steve Davenport (1st season)
- Offensive coordinator: Terance Mathis (1st season)
- Home stadium: Ted A. Wright Stadium

2011 Mid-Eastern Athletic Conference football standings
	Conf.			Overall
Team	W		L	W		L
No. 19 Norfolk State $^	7	–	1	9	–	3
Bethune–Cookman	6	–	2	8	–	3
South Carolina State	6	–	2	7	–	4
Florida A&M	5	–	3	7	–	4
Hampton	5	–	3	7	–	4
Howard	4	–	4	5	–	6
Morgan State	4	–	4	5	–	6
North Carolina A&T	4	–	4	5	–	6
Delaware State	1	–	7	3	–	8
North Carolina Central	1	–	7	2	–	9
Savannah State	1	–	7	1	–	10
$ – Conference champion; ^ – FCS playoff participant; Rankings from The Sports Network poll

The 2011 Savannah State Tigers football team represented Savannah State University in the 2011 NCAA Division I FCS football season. The Tigers are a first year member of the Mid-Eastern Athletic Conference (MEAC). This was the first season under the guidance of head coach Steve Davenport and played their home games at Ted Wright Stadium. They finished the season 1–10, 1–7 in MEAC play to finish in a tie for ninth place.

== Coaches and support staff ==
Name	Type	College	Graduating year
Steve Davenport	Head coach	Georgia Tech	1990
Greg Lester	Assistant head coach/Outside Receivers coach	Georgia Tech	
Terance Mathis	Offensive coordinator/Inside Receivers coach	New Mexico	1990
Thomas Balkcom	Defensive backs coach	Georgia Tech	
William Bell	Running backs coach	Georgia Tech	
Mitch Doolittle	Linebackers coach	Presbyterian College	2006
Saeed Khalif	Defensive coordinator/defensive line coach	Georgia Tech	1988
Tony Haynes	Quarterbacks coach	Webber International	2005
Broderick Jones	Offensive line coach	Ole Miss	2005

== Media ==
Radio flagship: WHCJ
Broadcasters: Steve Richards (play-by-play), Curtis Foster (analyst)

== Schedule ==
Date	Time	Opponent	Site	Result	Attendance
September 3	5 :00 p.m.	at Albany State*	Henderson Stadium; Macon, Georgia (Music City Classic)	L 34–37	7,105
September 10	8:00 p.m.	at Southeastern Louisiana*	Strawberry Stadium; Hammond, Louisiana	L 6–63	4,974
September 17	6:00 p.m.	at No. 3 Appalachian State*	Kidd Brewer Stadium; Boone, North Carolina	L 6–41	24,917
September 24	6:00 p.m.	at North Carolina Central	O'Kelly–Riddick Stadium; Durham, North Carolina	W 33–30	7,536
October 1	7:00 p.m.	Howard	Ted Wright Stadium; Savannah, Georgia (Coming Home/Hall of Fame Game)	L 14–34	5,635
October 8	1:00 p.m.	at Morgan State	Hughes Stadium; Baltimore, Maryland	L 17–44	14,356
October 15	7:00 p.m.	Florida A&M	Ted Wright Stadium; Savannah, Georgia	L 7–47	4,356
October 29	2:00 p.m.	Hampton^{†}	Ted Wright Stadium; Savannah, Georgia	L 5–22	10,375
November 5	5:00 p.m.	Norfolk State	Ted Wright Stadium; Savannah, Georgia	L 3–45	4,193
November 12	3:00 p.m.	at Bethune–Cookman	Municipal Stadium; Daytona Beach, Florida	L 3–59	4,964
November 19	2:00 p.m.	South Carolina State	Ted Wright Stadium; Savannah, Georgia	L 10–20	4,069
*Non-conference game; ^{†}Homecoming; Rankings from The Sports Network Poll released prior to the game; All times are in Eastern time

== Game summaries ==
=== Albany State ===
Quarter	1	2	3	4	Total
Savannah State	0	3	18	13	34
Albany State	12	7	3	15	37

at Henderson Stadium, (Macon, Georgia) in the Music City Classic

- Game time: 5 p.m.
- Game attendance: 7,105
- Referee: Arthur Williams

The Tigers lost the season opener, 37-34, as the Golden Rams' quarterback Stan Jennings scored on a twelve-yard run with 26 seconds remaining in the fourth quarter of the 2011 Music City Classic. The Tigers trailed at halftime 19-0, but took a 27-22 lead early in the fourth quarter.

SSU's quarterback A.J. Defilippis threw for 315 yards and three touchdowns while running back Justin Babb rushed for 37 yards on sixteen carries. Brian Lackey had 3 receptions for 115 yards and one touchdown. Derek Williams kicked a 52-yard field goal, breaking the SSU record of 51 yards which was set by Calvin Tucker in 1986. Linebacker Nate Clay had 18 tackles in the game.

=== Southeastern Louisiana ===
Quarter	1	2	3	4	Total
Savannah State	3	3	0	0	6
Southeastern Louisiana	7	35	14	7	63

at Strawberry Stadium (Hammond, Louisiana)

- Game time: 7 p.m. (CST)
- Game weather: Clear
- Game attendance: 4,974
- Referee: Ross Smith
- TV: Southeastern Channel

The Tigers keep the game close in the first quarter, trailing 14-6, but Southeastern Louisiana scored 49 unanswered points the rest of the way and easily won 63-6. Senior kicker Derek Williams kicked field goals of 27 and 39 yards for the Tigers only scores of the game. Quarterback AJ DeFilippis passed for 68 yards and Darren Heyward led the Tigers defense with 11 tackles.

=== Appalachian State ===
Quarter	1	2	3	4	Total
Savannah State	0	0	0	6	6
Appalachian State	10	17	7	7	41

at Kidd Brewer Stadium (Boone, North Carolina)

- Game time: 7 p.m. (CST)
- Game weather: Cloudy
- Game attendance: 24,917
- Referee: Rodney Burnette

The Mountaineers of Appalachian State University, ranked at #3, scored on five of the first seven possessions of the game and cruised to a 41-6 win over the Tigers at Kidd Brewer Stadium. The Tigers trailed 27-0 and halftime and were only able to muster one score, a 10-yard touchdown run early in the fourth quarter by quarterback Antonio Bostick. Starting quarterback AJ DeFilippis left the game early in the second quarter with a head injury. Bostick threw for 136 yards but was sacked three times. DeFilippis, passed for 81 yards before leaving the game, but was also sacked three times by the Mountaineer defense. On defense, Vaughn Cornelia led the Tigers with a game-high 11 tackles.

=== North Carolina Central ===
Quarter	1	2	3	4	Total
Savannah State	6	7	7	13	33
North Carolina Central	6	6	3	15	30

at O'Kelly–Riddick Stadium (Durham, North Carolina)

- Game time: 6 p.m.
- Game weather: Mostly Cloudy
- Game attendance: 7,536
- Referee: Preston Harding

The Tigers earned their first ever MEAC conference win in their first MEAC Conference game with a 33-30 win against North Carolina Central. Quarterback Antonio Bostic got his first start of the season and ran for two touchdowns and threw for another. Senior running back Justin Babb rushed for a game-high 93 yards and one touchdown. The Tigers defense sacked the Eagles quarterback five times in the game.

=== Howard ===
Quarter	1	2	3	4	Total
Howard	0	20	7	7	34
Savannah State	7	0	0	7	14

at Ted Wright Stadium (Savannah, Georgia) in the Coming Home / Hall of Fame Game

- Game time: 7 p.m.
- Referee: Darrel Davis

The Tigers scored first in the newly renovated Ted Wright Stadium, taking a 7-0 lead with seconds left in the first quarter, but the Howard Bison scored 20 unanswered points in the second quarter en route to a 34-14 win in the Tigers first home game of the season. A crowd of 5,635 were on hand as the Tigers played on campus for the first time since November 14, 2009, because of stadium renovations. Starting quarterback A.J. DeFilippis finished the game with 91 yards, completing 12 of his 26 pass attempts and threw one touchdown. He was intercepted once by the Bison defense and sacked five times. Sophomore quarterback Antonio Bostick also threw one interception and was sacked three times. He threw for 62 yards and one touchdown. The Tigers finished the game with 74 total yards of rushing on 32 carries, despite the fact that senior running back Justin Babb led the team with 79 yards on 11 carries. The win by the Bison was their first MEAC victory since October 27, 2007.

=== Morgan State ===
Quarter	1	2	3	4	Total
Savannah State	7	3	7	0	17
Morgan State	7	10	14	13	44

at Hughes Stadium (Baltimore, Maryland)

- Game time: 1:00 pm
- Game weather: Clear
- Game attendance: 14,356
- Referee: F. Williams

A boisterous crowd of 14,356 were on hand as the Tigers gave up 30 points for the sixth consecutive game the season in a 44-17 loss to Morgan State. The Tigers struggled on both sides of the ball managing just 188 yards of total offense and surrendering 430 yards to the Bears who entered the game ranked last in the Football Championship Subdivision in scoring (9.2 points per game) and total offense (190 yards per game). The Tigers fell to 1-5 this season and 1-2 in the MEAC.

=== Florida A&M ===
Quarter	1	2	3	4	Total
Florida A&M	14	14	6	13	47
Savannah State	0	0	7	0	7

at Ted Wright Stadium (Savannah, Georgia)

- Game time: 7 p.m.
- Game attendance: 4,356
- Referee: Andre' Love

The Tigers scored their only touchdown of the game on a 38-yard TD run by Sheldon Barnes with 11:09 to go in the third. The Tigers were led on offense by Justin Babbs, who rushed for 117 yards on ten carries and A.J. DeFillips who had six completions in 19 attempts for 97 yards. Chris Asbury led the Tiger defense with a game-high ten tackles.

=== Hampton ===
Quarter	1	2	3	4	Total
Hampton	3	0	5	14	22
Savannah State	2	3	0	0	5

at Ted Wright Stadium (Savannah, Georgia) -- Homecoming

- Game time: 2 p.m.
- Game attendance: 10,375
- Referee: Clement Hall

A crowd of 10,350 were on hand at Wright Stadium as the Tigers fell to the Hampton Pirates, . The Tigers led at halftime after Nate Clay tackled a Hampton player in the end zone for a safety and Derek Williams kicked a 22-yard field goal. The Pirates scored 19 unanswered points to open the second half and held the Tigers to just 38 yards. Quarterback Antonio Bostick led the Tigers offense with 70 yards passing and 44 yards rushing. On the defensive side, Clay had 16 tackles followed by Sadrak JeanBaptiste (14) and Chris Asbury (13).

=== Norfolk State ===
Quarter	1	2	3	4	Total
Norfolk State	21	3	14	7	45
Savannah State	0	0	3	0	3

at Ted Wright Stadium (Savannah, Georgia)

- Game time: 5 p.m.
- Game attendance: 4,193
- Referee: Darrell Davis

Spartan's quarterback Chris Walley threw three touchdown pass and ran for two more as the Spartans beat the Tigers 45-3 and clinched a share of MEAC regular season title. The Tigers' never made it into the red zone and collected only 45 yards of total offense in the game.

=== Bethune–Cookman ===
Quarter	1	2	3	4	Total
Savannah State	0	3	0	0	3
Bethune-Cookman	17	7	21	14	59

at Municipal Stadium (Daytona Beach, Florida)

- Game time: 4 p.m.
- Game weather: Partly Cloudy
- Game attendance: 4,964
- Referee: Donnell Leathers

A 30-yard field goal early in the second quarter by Derek Williams was the only scoring for the SSU as Bethune-Cookman routed the Tigers before a crowd of 4,964 at Municipal Stadium in Daytona, Beach. SSU quarterback AJ DeFilippis threw for 45 yards while Justin Babb ran for 66 yards and caught three passes for ten yards. Jamani Chavis and Justin Dixon each had eight tackles to lead the SSU defense. David Blackwell ran for three touchdowns and threw for two more for the Wildcats who improved to 7-3. The Tigers fell to 1-9.

=== South Carolina State ===
Quarter	1	2	3	4	Total
South Carolina State	10	7	0	3	20
Savannah State	0	3	0	7	10

at Ted Wright Stadium (Savannah, Georgia)

- Game time: 2 p.m.
- Game attendance: 4,096

The Bulldogs of South Carolina State took a 17-0 early in the second quarter and SSU's Derek Williams kicked a 33-yard field goal with just over 5 minutes left before halftime. The Tigers scored early in the 4th quarter as Antonio Bostick threw a 27-yard touchdown pass to Brian Lackey, but the Bulldogs responded with a 45-yard field goal with 4:16 remaining in the game. Lackey caught 3 passes for 53 yards to lead the Tigers while Bostick passed for 176 yards and Justin Babb ran for 25 yards. Darren Hunter led the Tigers defense with 11 tackles. This was the final game for 18 Tiger seniors.
