= 2009 Morgan State Bears football team =

American college football season

2009 Morgan State Bears football
- Conference: Mid-Eastern Athletic Conference
- Record: 6–5 (4–4 MEAC)
- Head coach: Donald Hill-Eley (8th season)
- Home stadium: Hughes Stadium

2009 Mid-Eastern Athletic Conference football standings
	Conf.			Overall
Team	W		L	W		L
No. 8 South Carolina State $^	7	–	1	10	–	2
No. 23 Florida A&M	6	–	2	8	–	3
Norfolk State	5	–	3	7	–	4
Morgan State	4	–	4	6	–	5
Bethune–Cookman	4	–	4	5	–	6
Delaware State	3	–	4	4	–	6
Hampton	3	–	5	5	–	6
North Carolina A&T	2	–	5	4	–	6
Howard	0	–	8	2	–	9
$ – Conference champion; ^ – FCS playoff participant; Rankings from The Sports Network poll

The 2009 Morgan State Bears football team represented Morgan State University as a member of the Mid-Eastern Athletic Conference (MEAC) during the 2009 NCAA Division I FCS football season. Led by eighth-year head coach Donald Hill-Eley, the Bears compiled an overall record of 6–5, with a mark of 4–4 in conference play, and finished tied for fourth in the MEAC.

== Schedule ==
Date	Opponent	Site	Result	Attendance	Source
September 12	at Akron*	InfoCision Stadium–Summa Field; Akron, OH	L 0–41	27,881	
September 19	vs. Winston-Salem State*	Giants Stadium; East Rutherford, NJ (Urban League Classic)	W 16–10	25,604	
September 26	Towson*	Hughes Stadium; Baltimore, MD (rivalry)	W 12–9		
October 3	at Bethune–Cookman	Municipal Stadium; Daytona Beach, FL	W 24–13	3,428	
October 10	North Carolina A&T	Hughes Stadium; Baltimore, MD	W 7–6	12,045	
October 15	Howard	Hughes Stadium; Baltimore, MD (rivalry)	W 14–7		
October 24	at Delaware State	Alumni Stadium; Dover, DE	L 22–35	5,327	
October 31	No. 24 Florida A&M	Hughes Stadium; Baltimore, MD	L 28–31 ^{OT}	3,410	
November 7	Norfolk State	Hughes Stadium; Baltimore, MD	L 23–31	3,121	
November 14	at No. 9 South Carolina State	Oliver C. Dawson Stadium; Orangeburg, SC	L 13–37		
November 21	at Hampton	Armstrong Stadium; Hampton, VA	W 16–13		
*Non-conference game; Rankings from The Sports Network Poll released prior to the game
