= 2009 Hampton Pirates football team =

American college football season

2009 Hampton Pirates football
- Conference: Mid-Eastern Athletic Conference
- Record: 5–6 (3–5 MEAC)
- Head coach: Donovan Rose (1st season)
- Home stadium: Armstrong Stadium

2009 Mid-Eastern Athletic Conference football standings
	Conf.			Overall
Team	W		L	W		L
No. 8 South Carolina State $^	7	–	1	10	–	2
No. 23 Florida A&M	6	–	2	8	–	3
Norfolk State	5	–	3	7	–	4
Morgan State	4	–	4	6	–	5
Bethune–Cookman	4	–	4	5	–	6
Delaware State	3	–	4	4	–	6
Hampton	3	–	5	5	–	6
North Carolina A&T	2	–	5	4	–	6
Howard	0	–	8	2	–	9
$ – Conference champion; ^ – FCS playoff participant; Rankings from The Sports Network poll

The 2009 Hampton Pirates football team represented Hampton University as a member of the Mid-Eastern Athletic Conference (MEAC) during the 2009 NCAA Division I FCS football season. Led by first-year head coach Donovan Rose, the Pirates compiled an overall record of 6–5, with a mark of 3–5 in conference play, and finished seventh in the MEAC.

== Schedule ==
Date	Opponent	Site	Result	Attendance	Source
September 5	North Carolina Central*	Armstrong Stadium; Hampton, VA	W 31–24	7,417	
September 12	at Alabama A&M*	Louis Crews Stadium; Normal, AL	L 24–31	6,377	
September 19	at North Carolina A&T	Aggie Stadium; Greensboro, NC	W 24–14	13,502	
September 26	Delaware State	Armstrong Stadium; Hampton, VA	L 6–21	4,632	
October 10	Howard	Armstrong Stadium; Hampton, VA (rivalry)	W 37–0		
October 17	at Norfolk State	William "Dick" Price Stadium; Norfolk, VA (rivalry)	L 6–46	6,342	
October 24	No. 10 South Carolina State	Armstrong Stadium; Hampton, VA	L 9–21	5,492	
October 31	at Winston-Salem State*	Bowman Gray Stadium; Winston-Salem, NC	W 16–13 ^{OT}	14,372	
November 7	at Bethune–Cookman	Municipal Stadium; Daytona Beach, FL	L 24–27	4,821	
November 14	No. 22 Florida A&M	Armstrong Stadium; Hampton, VA	W 25–0	1,931	
November 21	Morgan State	Armstrong Stadium; Hampton, VA	L 13–16		
*Non-conference game; Rankings from The Sports Network Poll released prior to the game
