= 2009 Delaware State Hornets football team =

American college football season

2009 Delaware State Hornets football
- Conference: Mid-Eastern Athletic Conference
- Record: 4–7 (3–5 MEAC)
- Head coach: Al Lavan (6th season)
- Offensive coordinator: Doug Sams (3rd season)
- Defensive coordinator: Rayford Petty (3rd season)
- Home stadium: Alumni Stadium

2009 Mid-Eastern Athletic Conference football standings
	Conf.			Overall
Team	W		L	W		L
No. 8 South Carolina State $^	7	–	1	10	–	2
No. 23 Florida A&M	6	–	2	8	–	3
Norfolk State	5	–	3	7	–	4
Morgan State	4	–	4	6	–	5
Bethune–Cookman	4	–	4	5	–	6
Delaware State	3	–	4	4	–	6
Hampton	3	–	5	5	–	6
North Carolina A&T	2	–	5	4	–	6
Howard	0	–	8	2	–	9
$ – Conference champion; ^ – FCS playoff participant; Rankings from The Sports Network poll

The 2009 Delaware State Hornets football team represented Delaware State University as a member of the Mid-Eastern Athletic Conference (MEAC) in the 2009 NCAA Division I FCS football season. The Hornets were led by sixth-year head coach Al Lavan and played their home games at Alumni Stadium. They finished the season 4–7 overall and 3–5 in conference play to place sixth in the MEAC.

Delaware State was given a forfeit for their scheduled game at North Carolina A&T after they declined to play the game in favor of playing at Michigan on the same day.

== Schedule ==
Date	Time	Opponent	Site	TV	Result	Attendance	Source
September 5	6:00 p.m.	at Florida A&M	Bragg Memorial Stadium; Tallahassee, FL		L 12–21	17,209	
September 19	12:00 p.m.	at Delaware*	Delaware Stadium; Newark, DE (Route 1 Rivalry)	WHYY	L 17–27	20,585	
September 26	6:00 p.m.	at Hampton	Armstrong Stadium; Hampton, VA		W 21–6	4,632	
October 10	7:00 p.m.	Bethune–Cookman	Alumni Stadium; Dover, DE		L 7–9	3,873	
October 17	12:00 p.m.	at Michigan*	Michigan Stadium; Ann Arbor, MI	BTN	L 6–63	106,304	
October 17		at North Carolina A&T	Aggie Stadium; Greensboro, NC		L (forfeit)		
October 24	1:00 p.m.	Morgan State^{†}	Alumni Stadium; Dover, DE		W 35–22	5,327	
October 31	1:30 p.m.	at No. 10 South Carolina State	Oliver C. Dawson Stadium; Orangeburg, SC		L 10–52	21,257	
November 7	1:00 p.m.	at Winston-Salem State*	Bowman Gray Stadium; Winston-Salem, NC		W 24–21	4,719	
November 14	1:00 p.m.	Norfolk State	Alumni Stadium; Dover, DE		L 16–21	4,127	
November 21	1:00 p.m.	Howard	Alumni Stadium; Dover, DE		W 30–20	2,731	
*Non-conference game; ^{†}Homecoming; Rankings from The Sports Network Poll released prior to the game
