= 2011 Norfolk State Spartans football team =

American college football season

2011 Norfolk State Spartans football
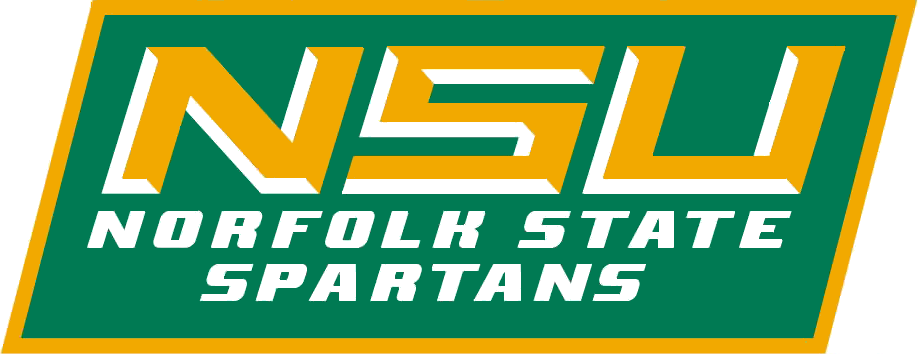

MEAC champion

FCS Playoffs First Round, L 18–35 vs. Old Dominion
- Conference: Mid-Eastern Athletic Conference

Ranking
- Sports Network: No. 19
- FCS Coaches: No. 22
- Record: 9–3 (7–1 MEAC)
- Head coach: Pete Adrian (7th season)
- Offensive coordinator: Joe Blackwell
- Defensive coordinator: Mark DeBastiani
- Home stadium: William "Dick" Price Stadium

2011 Mid-Eastern Athletic Conference football standings
	Conf.			Overall
Team	W		L	W		L
No. 19 Norfolk State $^	7	–	1	9	–	3
Bethune–Cookman	6	–	2	8	–	3
South Carolina State	6	–	2	7	–	4
Florida A&M	5	–	3	7	–	4
Hampton	5	–	3	7	–	4
Howard	4	–	4	5	–	6
Morgan State	4	–	4	5	–	6
North Carolina A&T	4	–	4	5	–	6
Delaware State	1	–	7	3	–	8
North Carolina Central	1	–	7	2	–	9
Savannah State	1	–	7	1	–	10
$ – Conference champion; ^ – FCS playoff participant; Rankings from The Sports Network poll

The 2011 Norfolk State Spartans football team represented Norfolk State University in the 2011 NCAA Division I FCS football season. The Spartans were led by seventh-year head coach Pete Adrian and played their home games at William "Dick" Price Stadium. They are a member of the Mid-Eastern Athletic Conference MEAC. They finished the season 9–3, 7–1 in MEAC play to win the conference championship. They received the conference's automatic bid into the FCS playoffs, where they lost in the first round to Old Dominion.

== Schedule ==
Date	Time	Opponent	Rank	Site	TV	Result	Attendance
September 3	6:00 pm	Virginia State*		William "Dick" Price Stadium; Norfolk, VA (Labor Day Classic)	SSC	W 37–3	17,357
September 10	1:00 pm	at No. 24 (FBS) West Virginia*		Mountaineer Field; Morgantown, WV	ESPN3	L 12–55	51,911
September 17	1:00 pm	at Howard		William H. Greene Stadium; Washington, D.C.		W 23–9	4,063
September 24	1:30 pm	at Charleston Southern*		Buccaneer Field; Charleston, SC		W 33–3	1,933
October 1	4:00 pm	No. 22 South Carolina State		William "Dick" Price Stadium; Norfolk, VA	SSC	W 17–14	10,137
October 8	1:00 pm	at Delaware State		Alumni Stadium; Dover, DE		W 38–21	3,198
October 15	4:00 pm	Hampton		William "Dick" Price Stadium; Norfolk, VA (Battle of the Bay)	SSC	W 34–24	19,556
October 20	7:30 pm	Bethune-Cookman	No. 24	William "Dick" Price Stadium; Norfolk, VA	ESPNU	L 6–14	10,053
October 29	2:00 pm	North Carolina A&T^{†}		William "Dick" Price Stadium; Norfolk, VA	SSC	W 14–10	18,752
November 5	5:00 pm	at Savannah State		Ted Wright Stadium; Savannah, GA		W 45–3	4,193
November 12	1:00 pm	at Morgan State	No. 22	Hughes Stadium; Baltimore, MD		W 47–14	5,329
November 26	1:30 pm	at No. 10 Old Dominion*	No. 19	Foreman Field; Norfolk, VA (FCS Playoffs First Round)	ESPN3	L 18–35	19,818
*Non-conference game; ^{†}Homecoming; Rankings from The Sports Network Poll released prior to the game; All times are in Eastern time
