= 2009 South Carolina State Bulldogs football team =

American college football season

2009 South Carolina State Bulldogs football

Black college national champion MEAC champion

NCAA Division I First Round, L 13–20 vs. Appalachian State
- Conference: Mid-Eastern Athletic Conference

Ranking
- Sports Network: No. 8
- FCS Coaches: No. 8
- Record: 10–2 (8–0 MEAC)
- Head coach: Oliver Pough (8th season)
- Home stadium: Oliver C. Dawson Stadium

2009 Mid-Eastern Athletic Conference football standings
	Conf.			Overall
Team	W		L	W		L
No. 8 South Carolina State $^	7	–	1	10	–	2
No. 23 Florida A&M	6	–	2	8	–	3
Norfolk State	5	–	3	7	–	4
Morgan State	4	–	4	6	–	5
Bethune–Cookman	4	–	4	5	–	6
Delaware State	3	–	4	4	–	6
Hampton	3	–	5	5	–	6
North Carolina A&T	2	–	5	4	–	6
Howard	0	–	8	2	–	9
$ – Conference champion; ^ – FCS playoff participant; Rankings from The Sports Network poll

The 2009 South Carolina State Bulldogs football team represented South Carolina State University as a member of the Mid-Eastern Athletic Conference (MEAC) during the 2009 NCAA Division I FCS football season. Led by eighth-year head coach Oliver Pough, the Bulldogs compiled an overall record of 10–2 and a mark of 8–0 in conference play, winning the MEAC title. South Carolina State earned an automatic bid NCAA Division I Football Championship playoffs, the Bulldogs lost to Appalachian State in the first round. At the conclusion of the season, South Carolina State was recognized as a black college national champion.

== Schedule ==
Date	Opponent	Rank	Site	Result	Attendance	Source
September 6	vs. No. T–25 Grambling State*	No. 16	Florida Citrus Bowl; Orlando, FL (MEAC/SWAC Challenge)	W 34–31	21,367	
September 12	at Bethune–Cookman	No. 15	Daytona Stadium; Daytona Beach, FL	W 24–3		
September 26	Winston-Salem State*	No. 14	Oliver C. Dawson Stadium; Orangeburg, SC	W 27–10	15,903	
October 3	at South Carolina*	No. 15	Williams–Brice Stadium; Columbia, SC	L 14–38	77,066	
October 10	at Norfolk State	No. 17	William "Dick" Price Stadium; Norfolk, VA	W 37–10	6,532	
October 17	No. 22 Florida A&M	No. 11	Oliver C. Dawson Stadium; Orangeburg, SC	W 35–20	24,496	
October 24	at Hampton	No. 10	Armstrong Stadium; Hampton, VA	W 21–9	5,492	
October 31	Delaware State	No. 10	Oliver C. Dawson Stadium; Orangeburg, SC	W 52–10	21,257	
November 7	at Howard	No. 10	William H. Greene Stadium; Washington, DC	W 43–13		
November 14	Morgan State	No. 9	Oliver C. Dawson Stadium; Orangeburg, SC	W 37–13		
November 21	North Carolina A&T	No. 7	Oliver C. Dawson Stadium; Orangeburg, SC (rivalry)	W 28–10		
November 28	at No. 5 Appalachian State*	No. 7	Kidd Brewer Stadium; Boone, NC (NCAA Division I First Round)	L 13–20	12,216	
*Non-conference game; Rankings from The Sports Network Poll released prior to the game
