= 2009 Howard Bison football team =

American college football season

2009 Howard Bison football
- Conference: Mid-Eastern Athletic Conference
- Record: 2–9 (0–8 MEAC)
- Head coach: Carey Bailey (3rd season)
- Home stadium: William H. Greene Stadium

2009 Mid-Eastern Athletic Conference football standings
	Conf.			Overall
Team	W		L	W		L
No. 8 South Carolina State $^	7	–	1	10	–	2
No. 23 Florida A&M	6	–	2	8	–	3
Norfolk State	5	–	3	7	–	4
Morgan State	4	–	4	6	–	5
Bethune–Cookman	4	–	4	5	–	6
Delaware State	3	–	4	4	–	6
Hampton	3	–	5	5	–	6
North Carolina A&T	2	–	5	4	–	6
Howard	0	–	8	2	–	9
$ – Conference champion; ^ – FCS playoff participant; Rankings from The Sports Network poll

The 2009 Howard Bison football team represented Howard University as a member of the Mid-Eastern Athletic Conference (MEAC) during the 2009 NCAA Division I FCS football season. Led by third-year head coach Carey Bailey, the Bison compiled an overall record of 2–9, with a conference record of 0–8, and finished ninth in the MEAC.

== Schedule ==
Date	Opponent	Site	Result	Attendance	Source
September 12	at Rutgers*	Rutgers Stadium; Piscataway, NJ	L 7–45	43,722	
September 17	at Florida A&M	Bragg Memorial Stadium; Tallahassee, FL	L 10–48	7,668	
September 26	at Georgetown*	Multi-Sport Field; Washington, DC	W 14–11	2,630	
October 3	Winston-Salem State*	William H. Greene Stadium; Washington, DC	W 7–3	2,883	
October 10	at Hampton	Armstrong Stadium; Hampton, VA (rivalry)	L 0–37		
October 15	at Morgan State	Hughes Stadium; Baltimore, MD (rivalry)	L 7–14		
October 24	North Carolina A&T	William H. Greene Stadium; Washington, DC	L 19–30	7,086	
October 31	at Norfolk State	William "Dick" Price Stadium; Norfolk, VA	L 6–41	15,832	
November 7	No. 10 South Carolina State	William H. Greene Stadium; Washington, DC	L 13–43		
November 14	Bethune–Cookman	William H. Greene Stadium; Washington, DC	L 10–21	541	
November 21	at Delaware State	Alumni Stadium; Dover, DE	L 20–30	2,731	
*Non-conference game; Rankings from The Sports Network Poll released prior to the game
