= Donovan Rose =

American gridiron football player (born 1957)

No. 27, 26, 6, 20
- Positions: Cornerback, safety

Personal information
- Born: March 9, 1957 (age 69); Norfolk, Virginia, U.S.
- Listed height: 6 ft 1 in (1.85 m)
- Listed weight: 187 lb (85 kg)

Career information
- High school: Norview (Norfolk)
- College: Hampton
- NFL draft: 1980: undrafted

Career history

Playing
- Kansas City Chiefs (1980); Toronto Argonauts (1981–1983); Winnipeg Blue Bombers (1983–1984); Hamilton Tiger-Cats (1985); Miami Dolphins (1986–1987); Indianapolis Colts (1988)*
- * Offseason or practice squad member only

Coaching
- Hampton (2009–2013) Head coach

Awards and highlights
- Grey Cup champion (1984)

Career NFL statistics
- Interceptions: 2
- Fumble recoveries: 1
- Stats at Pro Football Reference

Donovan James Rose (born March 9, 1957) is an American former professional football player who was a defensive back in the National Football League (NFL) and Canadian Football League (CFL). He was the head coach of the Hampton Pirates from 2009 to 2013. He played college football at Hampton and played for the Kansas City Chiefs and Miami Dolphins of the NFL and the Toronto Argonauts, Winnipeg Blue Bombers and Hamilton Tiger-Cats of the CFL.

== Head coaching record ==
Year	Team	Overall	Conference	Standing	Bowl/playoffs
Hampton Pirates (Mid-Eastern Athletic Conference) (2009–2013)
2009	Hampton	5–6	3–5	7th	
2010	Hampton	6–5	5–3	4th	
2011	Hampton	7–4	5–3	T–4th	
2012	Hampton	3–7	3–5	8th	
2013	Hampton	4–8	4–4	T–5th	
Hampton:		25–30	20–20		
Total:		25–30			
