= 2009 Florida A&M Rattlers football team =

American college football season

2009 Florida A&M Rattlers football
- Conference: Mid-Eastern Athletic Conference

Ranking
- Sports Network: No. 23
- FCS Coaches: No. 22
- Record: 8–3 (6–2 MEAC)
- Head coach: Joe Taylor (2nd season)
- Co-defensive coordinator: Earl Holmes (2nd season)
- Home stadium: Bragg Memorial Stadium

2009 Mid-Eastern Athletic Conference football standings
	Conf.			Overall
Team	W		L	W		L
No. 8 South Carolina State $^	7	–	1	10	–	2
No. 23 Florida A&M	6	–	2	8	–	3
Norfolk State	5	–	3	7	–	4
Morgan State	4	–	4	6	–	5
Bethune–Cookman	4	–	4	5	–	6
Delaware State	3	–	4	4	–	6
Hampton	3	–	5	5	–	6
North Carolina A&T	2	–	5	4	–	6
Howard	0	–	8	2	–	9
$ – Conference champion; ^ – FCS playoff participant; Rankings from The Sports Network poll

The 2009 Florida A&M Rattlers football team represented Florida A&M University as a member of the Mid-Eastern Athletic Conference (MEAC) during the 2009 NCAA Division I FCS football season. The Rattlers were led by second-year head coach Joe Taylor and played their home games at Bragg Memorial Stadium. They finished the season 8–3 overall and 6–2 in conference play to place second in the MEAC.

== Schedule ==
Date	Time	Opponent	Rank	Site	TV	Result	Attendance	Source
September 5	6:00 p.m.	Delaware State		Bragg Memorial Stadium; Tallahassee, FL		W 21–12	17,209	
September 10	7:30 p.m.	at Winston-Salem State*		Bowman Gray Stadium; Winston-Salem, NC		W 34–10	6,313	
September 17	7:30 p.m.	Howard		Bragg Memorial Stadium; Tallahassee, FL		W 48–10	7,668	
September 26	4:45 p.m.	vs. Tennessee State*		Georgia Dome; Atlanta, GA		W 31–12	51,950	
October 10	7:00 p.m.	at No. 11 (FBS) Miami (FL)*	No. 22	Land Shark Stadium; Miami, FL	ESPN360	L 16–48	47,859	
October 17	2:00 p.m.	at No. 11 South Carolina State	No. 22	Oliver C. Dawson Stadium; Orangeburg, SC		L 20–35	24,496	
October 24	3:00 p.m.	Norfolk State		Bragg Memorial Stadium; Tallahassee, FL		W 34–20	17,049	
October 31	4:00 p.m.	at Morgan State	No. 24	Hughes Stadium; Baltimore, MD		W 31–28 ^{OT}	3,410	
November 7	3:00 p.m.	North Carolina A&T	No. 22	Bragg Memorial Stadium; Tallahassee, FL		W 31–27	8,034	
November 14	1:00 p.m.	at Hampton	No. 22	Armstrong Stadium; Hampton, VA		L 0–25	1,931	
November 21	2:30 p.m.	vs. Bethune–Cookman		Florida Citrus Bowl; Orlando, FL (Florida Classic)		W 42–6	59,418	
*Non-conference game; Rankings from The Sports Network Poll released prior to the game; All times are in Eastern time
