= 2011 North Carolina Central Eagles football team =

American college football season

2011 North Carolina Central Eagles football
- Conference: Mid-Eastern Athletic Conference
- Record: 2–9 (1–7 MEAC)
- Head coach: Henry Frazier III (1st season)
- Offensive coordinator: Michael Bryant (1st season)
- Defensive coordinator: John Morgan Jr. (1st season)
- Home stadium: O'Kelly–Riddick Stadium

2011 Mid-Eastern Athletic Conference football standings
	Conf.			Overall
Team	W		L	W		L
No. 19 Norfolk State $^	7	–	1	9	–	3
Bethune–Cookman	6	–	2	8	–	3
South Carolina State	6	–	2	7	–	4
Florida A&M	5	–	3	7	–	4
Hampton	5	–	3	7	–	4
Howard	4	–	4	5	–	6
Morgan State	4	–	4	5	–	6
North Carolina A&T	4	–	4	5	–	6
Delaware State	1	–	7	3	–	8
North Carolina Central	1	–	7	2	–	9
Savannah State	1	–	7	1	–	10
$ – Conference champion; ^ – FCS playoff participant; Rankings from The Sports Network poll

The 2011 North Carolina Central Eagles football team represented North Carolina Central University as a member of the Mid-Eastern Athletic Conference (MEAC) during the 2011 NCAA Division I FCS football season. Led by first-year head coach Henry Frazier III, the Eagles compiled an overall record of 2–9 with a mark of 1–7, placing in a three-way tie for ninth in the MEAC. North Carolina Central played home games at O'Kelly–Riddick Stadium in Durham, North Carolina.

== Schedule ==
Date	Time	Opponent	Site	TV	Result	Attendance
September 1	7:30 pm	at Rutgers*	High Point Solutions Stadium; Piscataway, NJ	ESPN3	L 0–48	40,061
September 10	12:00 pm	vs. Central State (OH)*	Cleveland Browns Stadium; Cleveland, OH (Cleveland Classic)		W 42–3	5,600
September 17	6:00 pm	Elon*	O'Kelly–Riddick Stadium; Durham, NC		L 22–23	6,722
September 24	6:00 pm	Savannah State	O'Kelly–Riddick Stadium; Durham, NC		L 30–33	7,536
October 8	1:30 pm	at South Carolina State	Oliver C. Dawson Stadium; Orangeburg, SC		L 38–49	22,181
October 15	4:00 pm	Morgan State	O'Kelly–Riddick Stadium; Durham, NC		L 3–52	4,218
October 22	2:00 pm	at Hampton	Armstrong Stadium; Hampton, VA		L 27–30 ^{OT}	8,147
October 29	2:00 pm	Bethune–Cookman^{†}	O'Kelly–Riddick Stadium; Durham, NC		L 6–34	12,516
November 5	1:00 pm	at Delaware State	Alumni Stadium; Dover, DE		W 14–7	1,795
November 12	2:00 pm	Florida A&M	O'Kelly–Riddick Stadium; Durham, NC		L 10–31	7,711
November 19	1:30 pm	at North Carolina A&T	Aggie Stadium; Greensboro, NC (rivalry)		L 21–31	18,413
*Non-conference game; ^{†}Homecoming; All times are in Eastern time
