= Steve Davenport =

American football player and coach (born 1967)

Current position
- Title: Head coach
- Team: South Gwinnett HS (GA)

Biographical details
- Born: May 3, 1967 (age 59); Atlanta, Georgia, U.S.

Playing career
- 1985–1988: Georgia Tech
- Position: Wide receiver

Coaching career (HC unless noted)
- 1990–1991: Southwest DeKalb HS (GA) (DB)
- 1992–1993: Georgia Tech (GA)
- 1994–1996: Southwest DeKalb HS (GA) (OC)
- 1997–2001: Redan HS (GA)
- 2003–2004: Decatur HS (GA)
- 2005–2006: Rockdale County HS (GA)
- 2007–2010: UAB (RB)
- 2011–2012: Savannah State
- 2014–2016: Woodland HS (GA)
- 2017–present: South Gwinnett HS (GA)

Head coaching record
- Overall: 2–20 (college)

Steve Davenport (born May 3, 1967) is an American football coach. He is the head football coach at South Gwinnett High School in Snellville, Georgia, a position he has held since 2017. Davenport served as the head football coach at Savannah State University in Savannah, Georgia from 2011 to 2012, compiling a record of 2–20.

== Playing career ==
Davenport was an All-American wide receiver at Southwest Dekalb High School in Decatur, Georgia. In college, he was a three-year starter at wide receiver, and a four-year letterman, for the Georgia Tech Yellow Jackets from 1985 to 1988. He was a member of the 1985 Yellow Jacket team that defeated Michigan State in the Hall of Fame Classic. Davenport is a graduate of Georgia Tech with a bachelor's degree in 1990 and a master's degree in 1994.

== Coaching career ==
Davenport was hired as a defensive backs coach at Southwest DeKalb High School (1990–91). He served as a graduate assistant coach at Georgia Tech during the 1992 and 1993 seasons under head coach Bill Lewis. During this assignment he was an assistant wide receivers coach, served as the assistant recruiting coordinator, and was responsible for the defensive scout team during practices.

He returned to Southwest DeKalb to become the offensive coordinator in 1994, a position he held until 1996. During this tenure, the Panthers won the 1995 Georgia State AAAAA championship. In 1997 Davenport was hired as the head football coach at Redan High School in Lithonia, Georgia where he spent four seasons (1997–2001).

He was the head coach at Decatur High School for two seasons (2003–2004) and was named the Georgia Class AA State Coach-of-the-Year in 2003 as the Bulldogs finished 13–1, losing in the state semifinals.

When he became the offensive coordinator at Rockdale County High School in Conyers, Georgia in 2005, he joined a staff that previously went 1–9 in 2004. The team finished the 2005 season as the runner-up in Region 8-AAAA, advancing into the second round of the state playoffs.

Davenport served at the University of Alabama-Birmingham as the running back coach and as the university's director of community relations.

=== Savannah State ===
Davenport was announced as head football coach at Savannah State University on January 7, 2011. He was relieved of his duties as head football coach on April 17, 2013.

== Personal life ==
Davenport is married to the former Stephanie Gilstrap and is the father of one child.

== Head coaching record ==
=== College ===
Year	Team	Overall	Conference	Standing	Bowl/playoffs
Savannah State Tigers (Mid-Eastern Athletic Conference) (2011–2012)
2011	Savannah State	1–10	1–7	T–9th	
2012	Savannah State	1–10	0–8	11th	
Savannah State:		2–20	1–15		
Total:		2–20			
