= 2009 Bethune–Cookman Wildcats football team =

American college football season

2009 Bethune–Cookman Wildcats football
- Conference: Mid-Eastern Athletic Conference
- Record: 5–6 (4–4 MEAC)
- Head coach: Alvin Wyatt (12th season)
- Home stadium: Municipal Stadium

2009 Mid-Eastern Athletic Conference football standings
	Conf.			Overall
Team	W		L	W		L
No. 8 South Carolina State $^	7	–	1	10	–	2
No. 23 Florida A&M	6	–	2	8	–	3
Norfolk State	5	–	3	7	–	4
Morgan State	4	–	4	6	–	5
Bethune–Cookman	4	–	4	5	–	6
Delaware State	3	–	4	4	–	6
Hampton	3	–	5	5	–	6
North Carolina A&T	2	–	5	4	–	6
Howard	0	–	8	2	–	9
$ – Conference champion; ^ – FCS playoff participant; Rankings from The Sports Network poll

The 2009 Bethune–Cookman Wildcats football team represented Bethune-Cookman University as a member of the Mid-Eastern Athletic Conference (MEAC) during the 2009 NCAA Division I FCS football season. The Wildcats were led by twelfth-year and final year as head coach Alvin Wyatt and played their home games at Municipal Stadium. They finished the season 5–6 overall and 4–4 in conference play, tying for fourth place in the MEAC.

== Schedule ==
Date	Time	Opponent	Site	TV	Result	Attendance	Source
September 5	4:00 pm	Shaw*	Municipal Stadium; Daytona Beach, FL		L 6–20	4,137	
September 12	4:00 pm	No. 15 South Carolina State*	Municipal Stadium; Daytona Beach, FL		L 3–24	5,745	
September 26	4:00 pm	at Norfolk State	William "Dick" Price Stadium; Norfolk, VA	ESPNU	L 14–40	7,040	
October 3	4:00 pm	Morgan State	Municipal Stadium; Daytona Beach, FL		L 13–24	3,428	
October 10	7:00 pm	at Delaware State	Alumni Stadium; Dover, DE		W 9–7	3,873	
October 17	5:00 pm	at Savannah State*	Ted Wright Stadium; Savannah, GA		W 34–24	3,517	
October 24	4:00 pm	Winston-Salem State*	Municipal Stadium; Daytona Beach, FL		L 10–16	7,957	
October 31	1:30 pm	at North Carolina A&T	Aggie Stadium; Greensboro, NC		W 31–13	21,500	
November 7	4:00 pm	Hampton	Municipal Stadium; Daytona Beach, FL		W 27–24	4,821	
November 14	1:00 pm	at Howard	William H. Greene Stadium; Washington, DC		W 21–10	541	
November 21	2:30 pm	vs. Florida A&M	Florida Citrus Bowl; Orlando, FL (Florida Classic)		L 6–42	59,418	
*Non-conference game; Rankings from The Sports Network Poll released prior to the game; All times are in Eastern time
