= 2011 North Carolina A&T Aggies football team =

American college football season

2011 North Carolina A&T Aggies football
- Conference: Mid-Eastern Athletic Conference
- Record: 5–6 (4–4 MEAC)
- Head coach: Rod Broadway (1st season)
- Offensive coordinator: Joe Pizzo (1st season)
- Defensive coordinator: Sam Washington (1st season)
- Home stadium: Aggie Stadium

2011 Mid-Eastern Athletic Conference football standings
	Conf.			Overall
Team	W		L	W		L
No. 19 Norfolk State $^	7	–	1	9	–	3
Bethune–Cookman	6	–	2	8	–	3
South Carolina State	6	–	2	7	–	4
Florida A&M	5	–	3	7	–	4
Hampton	5	–	3	7	–	4
Howard	4	–	4	5	–	6
Morgan State	4	–	4	5	–	6
North Carolina A&T	4	–	4	5	–	6
Delaware State	1	–	7	3	–	8
North Carolina Central	1	–	7	2	–	9
Savannah State	1	–	7	1	–	10
$ – Conference champion; ^ – FCS playoff participant; Rankings from The Sports Network poll

The 2011 North Carolina A&T Aggies football team represented North Carolina A&T State University as a member of Mid-Eastern Athletic Conference (MEAC) during the 2011 NCAA Division I FCS football season. Led by first-year head coach Rod Broadway, the Aggies compiled an overall record of 5–6 with a mark of 4–4 in conference play, tying for sixth place in the MEAC. North Carolina A&T played home games at Aggie Stadium in Greensboro, North Carolina.

== Schedule ==
Date	Time	Opponent	Site	Result	Attendance
September 3	4:00 pm	Virginia–Lynchburg*	Aggie Stadium; Greensboro, NC	W 38–7	11,659
September 10	3:30 pm	at No. 3 Appalachian State*	Kidd Brewer Stadium; Boone, NC	L 6–58	26,415
September 24	4:00 pm	Coastal Carolina*	Aggie Stadium; Greensboro, NC	L 14–31	9,709
October 1	4:00 pm	at Morgan State	Hughes Stadium; Baltimore, MD	W 24–3	2,312
October 8	1:30 pm	Bethune–Cookman	Aggie Stadium; Greensboro, NC	W 22–3	10,352
October 15	1:30 pm	Delaware State^{†}	Aggie Stadium; Greensboro, NC	W 42–24	19,454
October 22	1:00 pm	at Howard	William H. Greene Stadium; Washington, DC	L 28–35 ^{OT}	7,086
October 29	2:00 pm	at Norfolk State	William "Dick" Price Stadium; Norfolk, VA	L 10–14	18,752
November 5	3:00 pm	at Florida A&M	Bragg Memorial Stadium; Tallahassee, FL	L 20–26	16,415
November 12	1:30 pm	at South Carolina State	Oliver C. Dawson Stadium; Orangeburg, SC (rivalry)	L 22–30	16,224
November 19	1:30 pm	North Carolina Central	Aggie Stadium; Greensboro, NC (rivalry)	W 31–21	18,413
*Non-conference game; ^{†}Homecoming; Rankings from The Sports Network Poll released prior to the game; All times are in Eastern time

== Game summaries ==
=== Virginia–Lynchburg ===
	1	2	3	4	Total
Dragons	0	0	7	0	7
Aggies	0	10	21	7	38

.

=== Appalachian State ===
	1	2	3	4	Total
Aggies	0	0	6	0	6
Mountaineers	14	7	21	16	58

.

=== Coastal Carolina ===
	1	2	3	4	Total
Chanticleers	3	14	7	7	31
Aggies	0	0	7	7	14

.
