= 2009 Norfolk State Spartans football team =

American college football season

2009 Norfolk State Spartans football
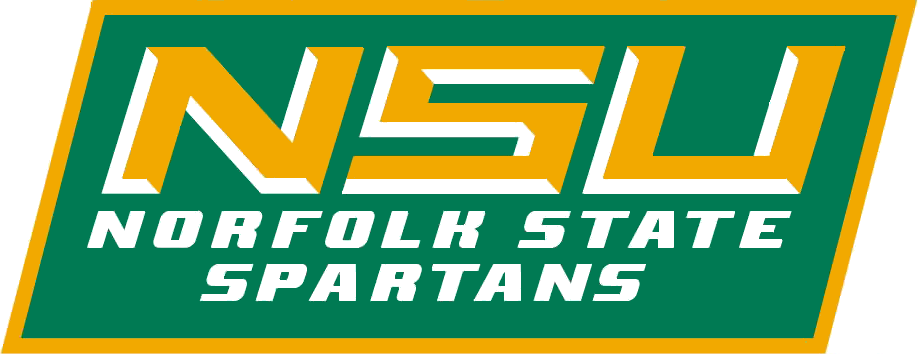
- Conference: Mid-Eastern Athletic Conference
- Record: 7–4 (6–3 MEAC)
- Head coach: Pete Adrian (5th season)
- Home stadium: William "Dick" Price Stadium

2009 Mid-Eastern Athletic Conference football standings
	Conf.			Overall
Team	W		L	W		L
No. 8 South Carolina State $^	7	–	1	10	–	2
No. 23 Florida A&M	6	–	2	8	–	3
Norfolk State	5	–	3	7	–	4
Morgan State	4	–	4	6	–	5
Bethune–Cookman	4	–	4	5	–	6
Delaware State	3	–	4	4	–	6
Hampton	3	–	5	5	–	6
North Carolina A&T	2	–	5	4	–	6
Howard	0	–	8	2	–	9
$ – Conference champion; ^ – FCS playoff participant; Rankings from The Sports Network poll

The 2009 Norfolk State Spartans football team represented Norfolk State University in the 2009 NCAA Division I FCS football season. The Spartans were led by fifth-year head coach Pete Adrian and played their home games at William "Dick" Price Stadium. They were a member of the Mid-Eastern Athletic Conference. They finished the season 7–4, 6–3 in MEAC play.

== Schedule ==
Date	Time	Opponent	Site	TV	Result	Attendance	Source
September 5	6:00 pm	Virginia State*	William "Dick" Price Stadium; Norfolk, VA		W 28–10	24,325	
September 12	6:00 pm	at North Carolina A&T	Aggie Stadium; Greensboro, NC		L 13–17	14,338	
September 19	6:00 pm	No. 5 William & Mary*	William "Dick" Price Stadium; Norfolk, VA		L 15–27	10,005	
September 26	4:00 pm	Bethune–Cookman	William "Dick" Price Stadium; Norfolk, VA	ESPNU	W 40–14	7,040	
October 10	1:00 pm	at No. 17 South Carolina State	William "Dick" Price Stadium; Norfolk, VA		L 10–37	6,532	
October 17	1:00 pm	Hampton	William "Dick" Price Stadium; Norfolk, VA (rivalry)	SSC	W 46–6	6,342	
October 24	3:00 pm	at Florida A&M	Bragg Memorial Stadium; Tallahassee, FL		L 20–34	17,049	
October 31	1:00 pm	Howard^{†}	William "Dick" Price Stadium; Norfolk, VA		W 41–6	15,832	
November 7	4:00 pm	at Morgan State	Hughes Stadium; Baltimore, MD		W 31–23	3,121	
November 14	1:00 pm	Delaware State	Alumni Stadium; Dover, DE		W 21–16	4,127	
November 21	1:00 pm	Winston-Salem State*	William "Dick" Price Stadium; Norfolk, VA	SSC	W 28–21	6,573	
*Non-conference game; ^{†}Homecoming; Rankings from The Sports Network Poll released prior to the game; All times are in Eastern time
