= 1902 Howard Bison football team =

American college football season

1902 Howard Bison football
- Conference: Independent
- Record: 1–1
- Head coach: Cap Washington (2nd season)

The 1902 Howard Bison football team represented Howard University in the 1902 college football season. They had no conference affiliation and compiled a record of 1–1.

== Schedule ==
Opponent	Site	Result	Source
Morgan State		W 23–0	
Lincoln (PA)		L 5-6	
