= Alonzo Lee =

American football coach (born 1958)

Biographical details
- Born: January 15, 1958 (age 68); Washington, D.C., U.S.
- Education: Eastern Illinois University (1982)

Playing career
- 1977–1981: Eastern Illinois
- Position: Linebacker

Coaching career (HC unless noted)
- 1982: Eastern Illinois (LB)
- 1983–1988: Howard (DB)
- 1989–1992: Florida A&M (LB)
- 1993–1996: Florida A&M (ST/DB/S&C)
- 1997–2002: Hampton (DC/ST)
- 2003–2005: North Carolina A&T (DC/LB)
- 2006–2008: Morgan State (DC)
- 2009–2010: North Carolina A&T
- 2011–2012: Morgan State (DC)
- 2015: Jackson State (DC)

Head coaching record
- Overall: 5–16

Accomplishments and honors

Awards
- AFCA Assistant Coach of the Year Award (1997)

Alonzo Lee Sr. (born January 15, 1958) is an American former college football coach. He was the head football coach for North Carolina A&T State University from 2009 to 2010. He also coached for Eastern Illinois, Howard, Florida A&M, Hampton, Morgan State, and Jackson State. He played college football for Eastern Illinois as a linebacker.

In 1997, Lee was named AFCA Assistant Coach of the Year.

== Head coaching record ==
Year	Team	Overall	Conference	Standing	Bowl/playoffs
North Carolina A&T Aggies (Mid-Eastern Athletic Conference) (2009–2010)
2009	North Carolina A&T	4–6	2–5	8th	
2010	North Carolina A&T	1–10	1–7	8th	
North Carolina A&T:		5–16	3–12		
Total:		5–16			
