= 2009 North Carolina A&T Aggies football team =

American college football season

2009 North Carolina A&T Aggies football
- Conference: Mid-Eastern Athletic Conference
- Record: 5–6 (3–5 MEAC)
- Head coach: Alonzo Lee (1st season)
- Home stadium: Aggie Stadium

2009 Mid-Eastern Athletic Conference football standings
	Conf.			Overall
Team	W		L	W		L
No. 8 South Carolina State $^	7	–	1	10	–	2
No. 23 Florida A&M	6	–	2	8	–	3
Norfolk State	5	–	3	7	–	4
Morgan State	4	–	4	6	–	5
Bethune–Cookman	4	–	4	5	–	6
Delaware State	3	–	4	4	–	6
Hampton	3	–	5	5	–	6
North Carolina A&T	2	–	5	4	–	6
Howard	0	–	8	2	–	9
$ – Conference champion; ^ – FCS playoff participant; Rankings from The Sports Network poll

The 2009 North Carolina A&T Aggies football team represented North Carolina A&T State University as a member of the Mid-Eastern Athletic Conference (MEAC) during the 2009 NCAA Division I FCS football season. Led by first-year head coach Alonzo Lee, the Aggies compiled an overall record of 5–6, with a mark of 3–5 in conference play, and finished eighth in the MEAC.

North Carolina A&T was awarded a forfeit victory for their scheduled game against Delaware State after the Hornets declined to play in favor of playing at Michigan on the same day.

== Schedule ==
Date	Opponent	Site	Result	Attendance	Source
September 5	at Winston-Salem State*	Bowman Gray Stadium; Winston-Salem, NC (rivalry)	W 19–10	22,000	
September 12	Norfolk State	Aggie Stadium; Greensboro, NC	W 17–13	14,338	
September 19	Hampton	Aggie Stadium; Greensboro, NC	L 14–24	13,502	
September 26	at Coastal Carolina*	Brooks Stadium; Conway, SC	L 7–28	7,367	
October 3	North Carolina Central*	Aggie Stadium; Greensboro, NC (rivalry)	W 23–17 ^{2OT}	19,534	
October 10	at Morgan State	Hughes Stadium; Baltimore, MD	L 6–7	12,045	
October 17	Delaware State	Aggie Stadium; Greensboro, NC	W (forfeit)		
October 24	at Howard	William H. Greene Stadium; Washington, DC	W 30–19	7,086	
October 31	Bethune–Cookman	Aggie Stadium; Greensboro, NC	L 13–31	21,500	
November 7	at No. 22 Florida A&M	Bragg Memorial Stadium; Tallahassee, FL	L 27–31	8,034	
November 21	at No. 7 South Carolina State	Oliver C. Dawson Stadium; Orangeburg, SC (rivalry)	L 10–28		
*Non-conference game; Rankings from The Sports Network Poll released prior to the game
