= Gary Harrell =

American gridiron football player and coach (born 1972)

Current position
- Title: Running backs coach
- Team: Wyoming
- Conference: MW

Biographical details
- Born: January 23, 1972 (age 54); Miami, Florida, U.S.

Playing career
- 1990–1993: Howard
- 1994–1995: New York Giants
- 1996: Frankfurt Galaxy
- 1996: Montreal Alouettes
- Position: Wide receiver

Coaching career (HC unless noted)
- 2002–2003: Howard (WR)
- 2004–2005: Texas Southern (WR)
- 2006–2007: Florida A&M (WR)
- 2008: Morgan State (QB)
- 2009–2010: Bowie State (OC)
- 2011–2016: Howard
- 2017–2018: Florida Atlantic (WR)
- 2019: Alabama State (AHC/RB)
- 2020–2022: Jackson State (RB)
- 2023–2024: Colorado (AHC/RB)
- 2025–present: Wyoming (RB)

Head coaching record
- Overall: 20–36

Gary Lamar Harrell, affectionately known as "The Flea," (born January 23, 1972) is an American college football coach at the University of Wyoming and former professional gridiron football player. He previously was the assistant head coach and running backs coach at the University of Colorado Boulder. Harrell was a wide receiver in the National Football League (NFL), World League of American Football (WLAF) and Canadian Football League (CFL) for three seasons during the 1990s. Harrell served two stints as the head football coach at Howard University in Washington, D.C. from 2011 to 2012 and 2014 to 2016, with a leave of absence in 2013. He joined the coaching staff at Alabama State University in January 2019, after a two-year stint under Lane Kiffin at Florida Atlantic University.

== Playing career ==
=== College ===
Harrell was a four-year letter winner as a wide receiver and punt return specialist at Howard University in Washington, D.C. He started every game for Howard's 1993 team, which won the Mid-Eastern Athletic Conference (MEAC) title. Harrell holds the Howard record for most receptions in a game (13) and in a career (184). He was inducted into the Howard University Hall of Fame in November 2005, and also received a proclamation from the City of Miami declaring it Gary "Flea" Harrell Day. Prior to attending Howard, he was a varsity athlete at Miami Northwestern Senior High School in Miami.

=== Professional ===
Harrell played two seasons in the National Football League (NFL), seeing action in four games during the 1994 and 1995 seasons with the New York Giants. He also played one season, in 1996, for the World League's Frankfurt Galaxy if the World League of American Football (WLAF) and two seasons, from 1996 to 1997, in the Canadian Football League (CFL) with the Montreal Alouettes.

== Coaching career ==
Harrell got his start in coaching at his alma mater, as Howard's wide receivers coach from 2002 to 2003. He served as wide receivers as Texas Southern University from 2004 to 2005 and then at Florida A&M University from 2006 to 2007. In 2008, Harrell was the quarterbacks coach at Morgan State University in Baltimore. While at Morgan State he also served as the wide receivers coach for Team Michigan, of the All American Football League (AAFL) in 2008. Harrell then spent to two seasons, from 2009 TO 2010, as the offensive coordinator at Bowie State University in Bowie, Maryland.

Harrell returned to Howard in 2011 as head football coach. In 2012, he was honored by the D.C. Touchdown Club as the Local College Coach of the Year at its inaugural awards dinner. Harrell took a leave of absence in 2013, but returned as Howard's head coach in 2014. In five seasons as Howard's head coach, Harrell compiled a record of 20–36 including a 7–4 mark in 2012.

Harrell joined Lane Kiffin's coaching staff at Florida Atlantic University in January 2017 as wide receivers coach. Under Harrell's tutelage, senior Kalib Woods was named the MVP of the 2017 Conference USA Football Championship Game. Willie Wright, a freshman, was the team's most consistent wideout and led the Owls with 56 catches and a total of six scores. Following the year, Wright earned a spot on the C-USA All-Freshman team. In 2019, Harrell served as assistant head coach and running backs coach for at Alabama State University.

Harrell joined Jackson State University in November 2020 as the team's running backs coach under Deion Sanders. During the 2021 season, Harrell acted as interim head coach while Sanders recovered from foot surgery. The Tigers won all three games while Sanders was absent. Jackson State credits Sanders as the head coach of record for the entire 2021 season.

In December 2022, Harrell followed Sanders to the University of Colorado Boulder to be the assistant head coach and running backs coach for the Colorado Buffaloes. In January 2025 it was announced that Harrell left the team.

In April 2025, Harrell was announced as the running backs coach at the University of Wyoming.

== Personal life ==
A native of Miami, Harrell earned a degree in marketing from Howard in 1994. He and his wife, Tenika, have two children: a daughter, Jasmine, and a son, Gary Jr., who also played football at Howard.

== Head coaching record ==
Year	Team	Overall	Conference	Standing	Bowl/playoffs
Howard Bison (Mid-Eastern Athletic Conference) (2011–2012)
2011	Howard	5–6	4–4	T–4th	
2012	Howard	7–4	6–2	2nd	
Howard Bison (Mid-Eastern Athletic Conference) (2014–2016)
2014	Howard	5–7	3–5	T–7th	
2015	Howard	1–10	1–7	T–8th	
2016	Howard	2–9	2–6	10th	
Howard:		20–36	16–24		
Total:		20–36			
