= Mike Ketchum =

American football coach

Current position
- Title: Defensive coordinator & linebackers coach
- Team: Bluefield
- Conference: AAC

Playing career
- 1975–1978: Guilford
- Position: Nose guard

Coaching career (HC unless noted)
- 1979–1980: Eau Gallie HS (FL) (JVOL)
- 1983–1984: Florida (GA)
- 1985–1986: Carson–Newman (OL)
- 1987: Carson–Newman (DL)
- 1988–1990: Guilford (OL)
- 1991–2004: Guilford
- 2006–2009: Winston–Salem State (DC)
- 2010: Winston–Salem State (DL)
- 2011–2014: Delaware State (DC)
- 2015–2017: Hampton (DC/LB)
- 2018–2019: Bluefield (OL/RGC)
- 2020–2022: Bluefield (OC/OL)
- 2023–present: Bluefield (DC/LB)

Administrative career (AD unless noted)
- 1996–2002: Guilford

Head coaching record
- Overall: 53–85

Accomplishments and honors

Championships
- 2 ODAC (1991, 1997)

Michael Ketchum is an American college football coach. He is the defensive coordinator and linebackers coach for Bluefield University, positions he has held since 2023. Ketchum served as the head football coach at Guilford College in Greensboro, North Carolina from 1991 to 2004, compiling a record of 53–85.

== Head coaching record ==
Year	Team	Overall	Conference	Standing	Bowl/playoffs
Guilford Quakers (Old Dominion Athletic Conference) (1991–2004)
1991	Guilford	8–2	4–1	T–1st	
1992	Guilford	2–8	1–4	6th	
1993	Guilford	2–8	1–4	T–4th	
1994	Guilford	8–2	3–2	T–2nd	
1995	Guilford	3–6	1–4	5th	
1996	Guilford	3–6	2–3	T–4th	
1997	Guilford	8–2	4–1	T–1st	
1998	Guilford	4–6	3–2	3rd	
1999	Guilford	4–6	2–4	6th	
2000	Guilford	1–9	1–5	7th	
2001	Guilford	4–6	3–3	T–2nd	
2002	Guilford	3–7	0–6	7th	
2003	Guilford	2–8	1–5	T–6th	
2004	Guilford	1–9	1–5	6th	
Guilford:		53–85	27–49		
Total:		53–85			
National championship Conference title Conference division title or championship game berth
