= 2011 Bethune–Cookman Wildcats football team =

American college football season

2011 Bethune–Cookman Wildcats football
- Conference: Mid-Eastern Athletic Conference
- Record: 8–3 (6–2 MEAC)
- Head coach: Brian Jenkins (2nd season)
- Home stadium: Municipal Stadium

2011 Mid-Eastern Athletic Conference football standings
	Conf.			Overall
Team	W		L	W		L
No. 19 Norfolk State $^	7	–	1	9	–	3
Bethune–Cookman	6	–	2	8	–	3
South Carolina State	6	–	2	7	–	4
Florida A&M	5	–	3	7	–	4
Hampton	5	–	3	7	–	4
Howard	4	–	4	5	–	6
Morgan State	4	–	4	5	–	6
North Carolina A&T	4	–	4	5	–	6
Delaware State	1	–	7	3	–	8
North Carolina Central	1	–	7	2	–	9
Savannah State	1	–	7	1	–	10
$ – Conference champion; ^ – FCS playoff participant; Rankings from The Sports Network poll

The 2011 Bethune–Cookman Wildcats football team represented Bethune-Cookman University in the 2011 NCAA Division I FCS football season. The Wildcats were led by fifth year head coach Brian Jenkins and played their home games at Municipal Stadium. They are a member of the Mid-Eastern Athletic Conference. They finished the season 8–3, 6–2 in MEAC play to finish in second place.

== Schedule ==
Date	Time	Opponent	Rank	Site	TV	Result	Attendance
September 4	12:00 pm	vs. Prairie View A&M*		Florida Citrus Bowl; Orlando, FL (MEAC/SWAC Challenge)	ESPN	W 63–14	17,337
September 10	4:00 pm	South Carolina State	No. 25	Municipal Stadium; Daytona Beach, FL		L 18–26	9,463
September 22	7:30 pm	Hampton		Municipal Stadium; Daytona Beach, FL	ESPNU	W 35–31	4,765
October 1	3:30 pm	at Miami (FL)*		Sun Life Stadium; Miami Gardens, FL	ESPNU	L 14–45	40,387
October 8	1:30 pm	at North Carolina A&T		Aggie Stadium; Greensboro, NC		L 3–22	10,352
October 15	4:00 pm	Fort Valley State*		Municipal Stadium; Daytona Beach, FL		W 58–30	4,921
October 20	7:30 pm	at No. 24 Norfolk State		William "Dick" Price Stadium; Norfolk, VA	ESPNU	W 14–6	10,053
October 29	2:00 pm	at North Carolina Central		O'Kelly–Riddick Stadium; Durham, NC		W 34–6	12,516
November 5	4:00 pm	Morgan State		Municipal Stadium; Daytona Beach, FL		W 49–23	9,649
November 12	3:00 pm	Savannah State		Municipal Stadium; Daytona Beach, FL		W 59–3	4,964
November 19	2:30 pm	vs. Florida A&M		Citrus Bowl; Orlando, FL (Florida Classic)	ESPNC	W 26–16	60,218
*Non-conference game; Rankings from The Sports Network Poll released prior to the game; All times are in Eastern time
