= Ted Wright Stadium =

Multi-purpose stadium

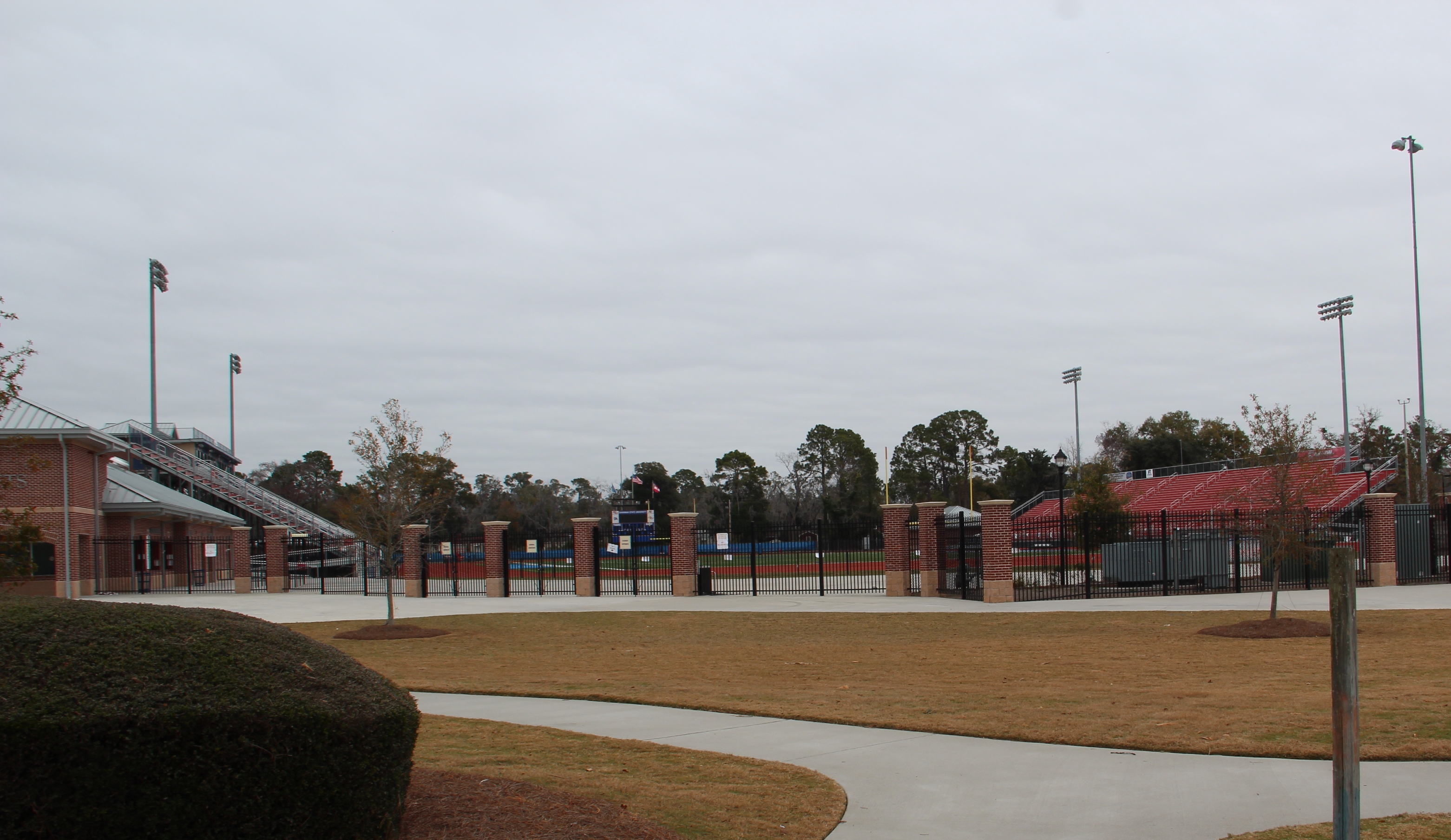
- Interactive map of Ted Wright Stadium
- Full name: Theodore A. Wright Stadium
- Location: Savannah State University; Savannah, GA
- Coordinates: 32.027593°N 81.068673°W
- Owner: Savannah State University
- Operator: Savannah State University
- Capacity: 8,500
- Surface: FieldTurf

Construction
- Opened: 1969

Tenants
- Savannah State Tigers (football & track) (1969–present); Benedictine Military School (football) (2012–2018)

Ted Wright Stadium is a 8,500-seat multi-purpose stadium in Savannah, Georgia, United States. The facility is located on the campus of Savannah State University. The stadium is primarily used for American football and track and field. It is home to the Savannah State Tigers football and track and field teams and occasionally hosts games and events by high schools in Chatham County. The stadium is named in honor of Ted A. Wright, who served as Savannah State's head football coach from 1947 to 1949.

The original stadium's construction was part of massive school building project that spanned from 1964 to 1971. The new stadium was built at a cost of $133,665 and John McGlockton, a 1935 graduate was instrumental in securing the lighting at no expense to the college. Prior to the current location of T.A. Wright Stadium, the SSU football team played in several different locations in over 100 years of competitive football. From 1902 to 1940, the Tigers played where the King-Frazier building now stands on the Savannah State campus. From 1940 to the 1969, they played on the grounds that the A.H. Gordon Library sits on today.

== Major renovations ==
Through an agreement between the Georgia Board of Regents and Chatham County, track and field improvements were made at the stadium between 1993 and 1995. A newly constructed 400-meter track and competitive field areas were a part of the "Olympic Legacy" package, a county program designed to provide recreational projects for county resident's use, and cost the Chatham County residents $1,062,980 in Special Purpose Local Option Sales Tax (SPLOST) funds. The Stadium Went under another renovations in 2010 at a cost of $6.5 million revitalization included Adding 5,000 seats, new professional style locker rooms, ticket booths, concession areas, brick front, and field turf. In 2009, a new press box was added featuring a President's Box. The stadium has undergone three major renovations since it was built in 1969. .

== See also ==
- List of NCAA Division I FCS football stadiums
