= Armstrong Stadium =

Stadium in Hampton, Virginia

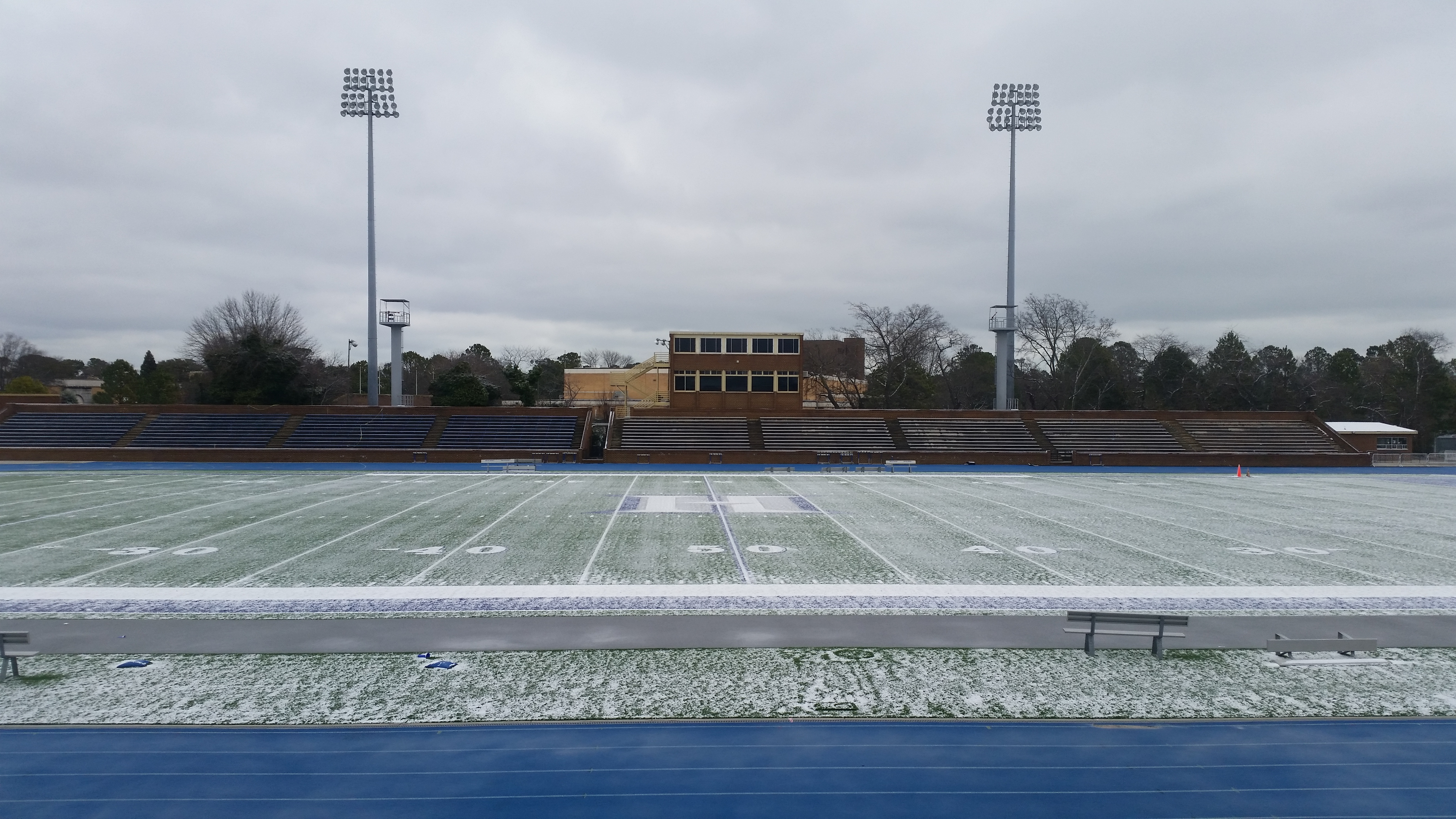
- Interactive map of Armstrong Stadium
- Location: Marshall Avenue; Hampton, Virginia 23669
- Coordinates: 37.02049°N 76.33355°W
- Owner: Hampton University
- Operator: Hampton University
- Capacity: 12,000
- Surface: AstroTurf GameDay Grass 3D Decade

Construction
- Groundbreaking: 1928
- Opened: October 6, 1928
- Renovated: 1978, 1998
- Expanded: 1948, 1985, 1986, 1999
- Architect: William E. Lee

Tenants
- Hampton University Pirates (NCAA) (1928–present); VHSL Class 5/6 State Championships (2016–present)

Armstrong Stadium is a 12,000-seat multi-purpose stadium in Hampton, Virginia. It opened in 1928. It is home to the Hampton University Pirates football team, lacrosse team, and men's and women's track teams.

== History ==
=== Initial construction ===
The original design for the stadium was provided by William E. Lee, a graduate of Hampton's Building and Construction Program.

Construction was completed by Hampton students. The initial seating capacity was 1,500. The stadium was officially dedicated on October 6, 1928.

=== Renovations and expansions ===
In 1948, additional seating was added to the west side of the field. In 1978, a new press box was added to the west side of the stadium. In 1985, new seating was added on the west side of the stadium. New seats were added to the east side of the stadium in 1986. Stadium lights and a new track were added in 1988. In 1991, a new press box was added to the east side of the stadium and new television towers were added to accommodate cameras for televised games. A year later, "ready rooms" were added beneath with west side seats. In 1998, the press box was renovated, the stadium was bricked, the playing field was resurfaced and a new scoreboard was installed.

In 1999, a new section behind the North end zone was added to add seating. This new section houses nine offices, meeting rooms, a locker room, reception and waiting areas and a team lounge.

== See also ==
- List of NCAA Division I FCS football stadiums
