= 2009 NCAA Division I Football Championship Game =

Postseason college football game

2009 NCAA Division I Football Championship
- FCS National Championship Game
Montana Grizzlies	Villanova Wildcats
(11–0)	(10–1)
Big Sky	CAA
21	23
Head coach: Bobby Hauck	Head coach: Andy Talley
TSN / Seed; 1 / 1	TSN / Seed; 2 / 2
	1	2	3	4	Total
Montana	7	7	0	7	21
Villanova	3	6	7	7	23
- Date: December 18, 2009
- Season: 2009
- Stadium: Finley Stadium
- Location: Chattanooga, Tennessee
- MVP: Matt Szczur (WR, Villanova)
- Favorite: Villanova by 2
- Referee: Matt Young (OVC)
- Attendance: 14,328

United States TV coverage
- Network: ESPN2

The 2009 NCAA Division I Football Championship Game was a postseason college football game between the Villanova Wildcats and the Montana Grizzlies. It was played on December 18, 2009, at Finley Stadium, home field of the University of Tennessee at Chattanooga. The culminating game of the 2009 NCAA Division I FCS football season, it was won by Villanova, 23–21.

== Teams ==
The participants of the Championship Game were the finalists of the 2009 FCS Playoffs, which began with a 16-team bracket.

=== Montana Grizzlies ===
Montana finished their regular season with an 11–0 record (8–0 in conference). As the first-seed in the tournament, the Grizzlies defeated South Dakota State, Stephen F. Austin, and Appalachian State to reach the final. This was Montana's second consecutive and seventh overall appearance in an FCS/Division I-AA championship game, having previously won in 1995 and 2001, and having lost in 1996, 2000, 2004, and 2008.

=== Villanova Wildcats ===
Villanova finished their regular season with a 10–1 record (7–1 in conference). As the second-seed in the tournament, the Wildcats defeated Holy Cross, New Hampshire (who had given Villanova their only loss during the regular season), and William & Mary to reach the final. This was Villanova's first appearance in an FCS/Division I-AA championship game.

== Game summary ==
=== Scoring summary ===
Scoring summary

Quarter	Time	Drive			Team	Scoring information	Score	
Quarter	Time	Plays	Yards	TOP	Team	Scoring information	MONT	NOVA
1	5:12	5	79	3:55	NOVA	23-yard field goal by Nick Yako	0	3
1	3:15	5	69	1:57	MONT	Marc Mariani 24-yard touchdown reception from Andrew Selle, Brody McKnight kick good	7	3
2	6:48	9	80	4:13	MONT	Jabin Sambrano 4-yard touchdown reception from Selle, McKnight kick good	14	3
2	3:34	7	66	3:14	NOVA	Matt Szczur 5-yard touchdown run, Yako kick no good	14	9
3	5:27	13	81	7:28	NOVA	Chris Farmer 3-yard touchdown reception from Chris Whitney, Yako kick good	14	16
4	11:04	10	95	4:47	NOVA	Szczur 3-yard touchdown run, Yako kick good	14	23
4	1:07	5	93	1:10	MONT	Sambrano 53-yard touchdown reception from Selle, McKnight kick good	21	23
"TOP" = time of possession. For other American football terms, see Glossary of American football.							21	23

=== Game statistics ===
	1	2	3	4	Total
No. 1 Grizzlies	7	7	0	7	21
No. 2 Wildcats	3	6	7	7	23

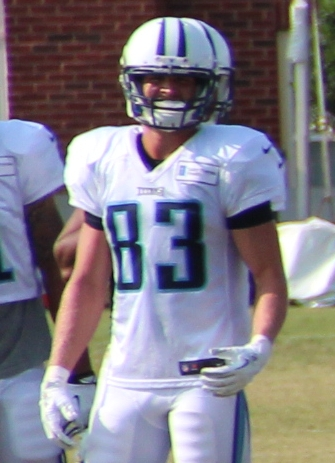
Montana wide receiver Marc Mariani

Statistics	MONT	NOVA
First downs	18	22
Plays–yards	56–425	64–493
Rushes–yards	19–60	51–351
Passing yards	365	142
Passing: comp–att–int	28–37–0	10–13–1
Time of possession	26:33	33:27

Team	Category	Player	Statistics
Montana	Passing	Andrew Selle	27–35, 351 yds, 3 TD
Montana	Rushing	Chase Reynolds	15 car, 64 yds
Montana	Receiving	Marc Mariani	9 rec, 178 yds, 1 TD
Villanova	Passing	Chris Whitney	10–13, 142 yds, 1 TD, 1 INT
Villanova	Rushing	Matt Szczur	14 car, 159 yds, 2 TD
Villanova	Receiving	Matt Szczur	4 rec, 68 yds
