= Matt Szczur =

American baseball player (born 1989)

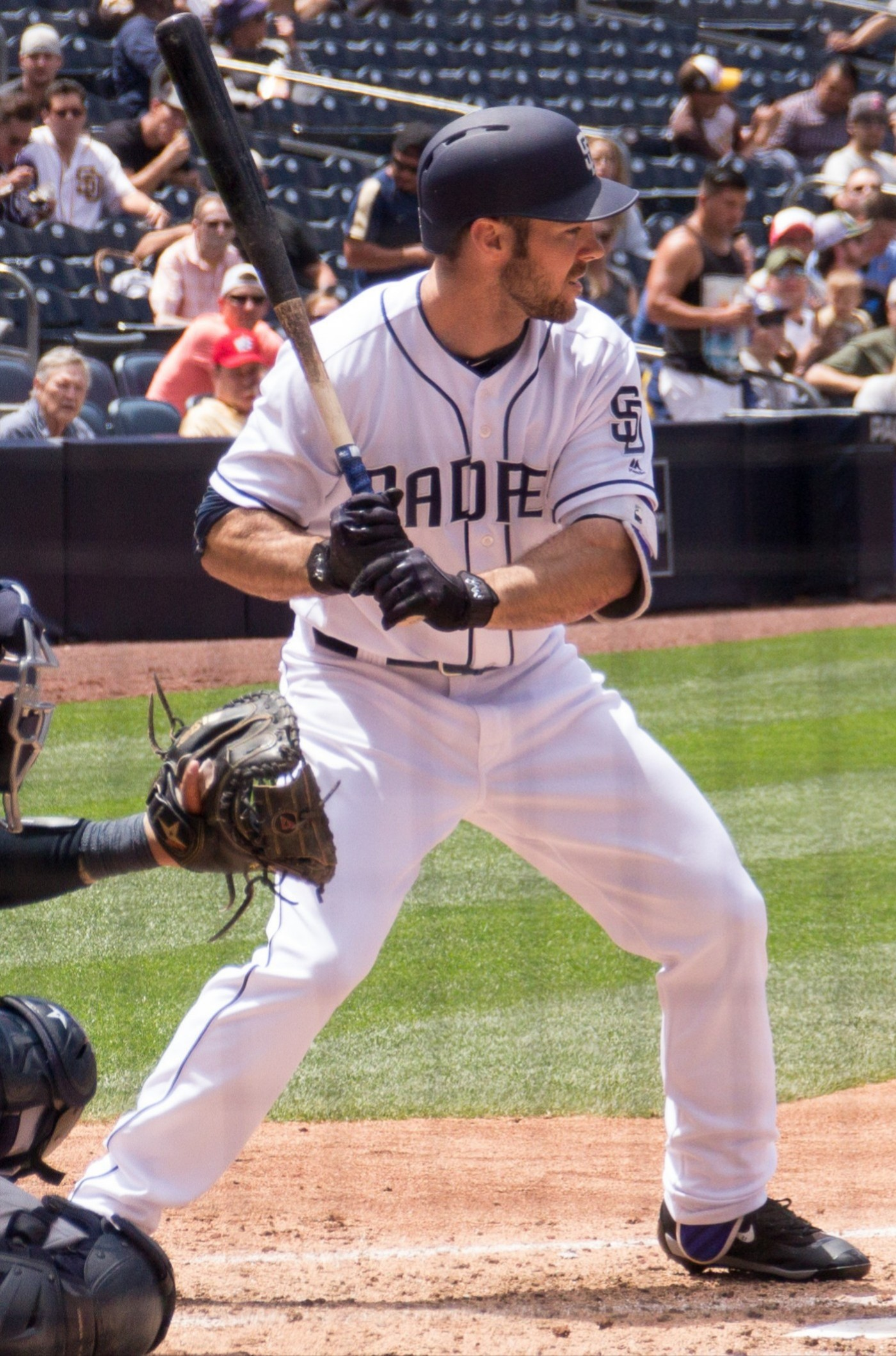
- Szczur batting for the San Diego Padres in 2017
- Outfielder
- Born: July 20, 1989 (age 37); Cape May Court House, New Jersey, U.S.
- Batted: Right Threw: Right

MLB debut
- August 17, 2014, for the Chicago Cubs

Last MLB appearance
- June 30, 2018, for the San Diego Padres

MLB statistics
- Batting average: .231
- Home runs: 12
- Runs batted in: 61
- Stats at Baseball Reference

Teams
- Chicago Cubs (2014–2017); San Diego Padres (2017–2018)

Career highlights and awards
- World Series champion (2016)

Matthew Francis Szczur (/ˈsiːzər/; born July 20, 1989) is an American former professional baseball outfielder. He made his Major League Baseball (MLB) debut with the Chicago Cubs in 2014 and also played for the San Diego Padres. Prior to his pro baseball career, Szczur played football and baseball at Villanova University, winning MVP of the 2009 FCS National Championship Game.

== Early life ==
Szczur was born in Cape May Court House, New Jersey, and grew up in the Erma section of Lower Township, New Jersey. He attended Lower Cape May Regional High School, where he earned varsity letters in football, baseball, and track and field. Szczur was drafted in the 2007 Major League Baseball draft out of high school by the Los Angeles Dodgers in the 38th round, but decided to attend Villanova University instead.

== College career ==
Szczur played both football and baseball for the Villanova Wildcats.

=== Football ===
In football, Szczur played wide receiver, running back, wildcat quarterback and was a return specialist on special teams. During his junior season, he was a consensus All-American and was named the CAA Offensive Player of the Year as Villanova went on to win its first-ever FCS National Championship. In the 2009 NCAA Division I Football Championship Game, he gained 270 all-purpose yards and was awarded MVP honors.

=== Baseball ===
In baseball, Szczur served as an outfielder and catcher for the Wildcats. After sitting out his freshman year due to a football-related injury, he hit .392 (142-362) with 62 RBI and 28 stolen bases over the next two seasons. During his junior season, he was a First Team All-Big East selection and named the Philadelphia Big 5 player of the year for baseball.

== Professional career ==
=== Chicago Cubs ===
==== Minor leagues ====
Szczur signed a contract with the Chicago Cubs organization, who drafted him in the fifth-round of the 2010 Major League Baseball draft. He received a $100,000 signing bonus, with an additional $500,000 if he declined to attend the NFL Combine and made a written commitment to baseball before February 10, 2011. He was assigned to the club's short season Low–A affiliate, the Boise Hawks, and first appeared in uniform July 8, 2010. He was then promoted to the club's Single–A affiliate, the Peoria Chiefs on July 27, 2010. Szczur hit .347/.414/.465 10 RBI and two stolen bases across 25 total games in 2010.

After the 2010 season, Szczur committed to baseball and signed a $1.5 million deal with the Cubs in January 2011. As he was released from his initial contract and signed a new contract to receive the bonus, he would have been eligible in the 2011 Rule 5 draft if not added to the Cubs' 40-man roster.

On July 9, 2011, Szczur was assigned to the High–A Daytona Cubs. He finished the year batting .293 in 109 games between Peoria and Daytona. On July 27, 2012, he was promoted to the Double–A Tennessee Smokies. He slashed .267/.360/.390 in 113 games between Tennessee and Daytona in 2012. In 2013, Szczur returned to Tennessee where he hit .281/.350/.367 with three home runs and 44 RBI. He began the 2014 season with the Triple-A Iowa Cubs before being promoted to the Major League roster.

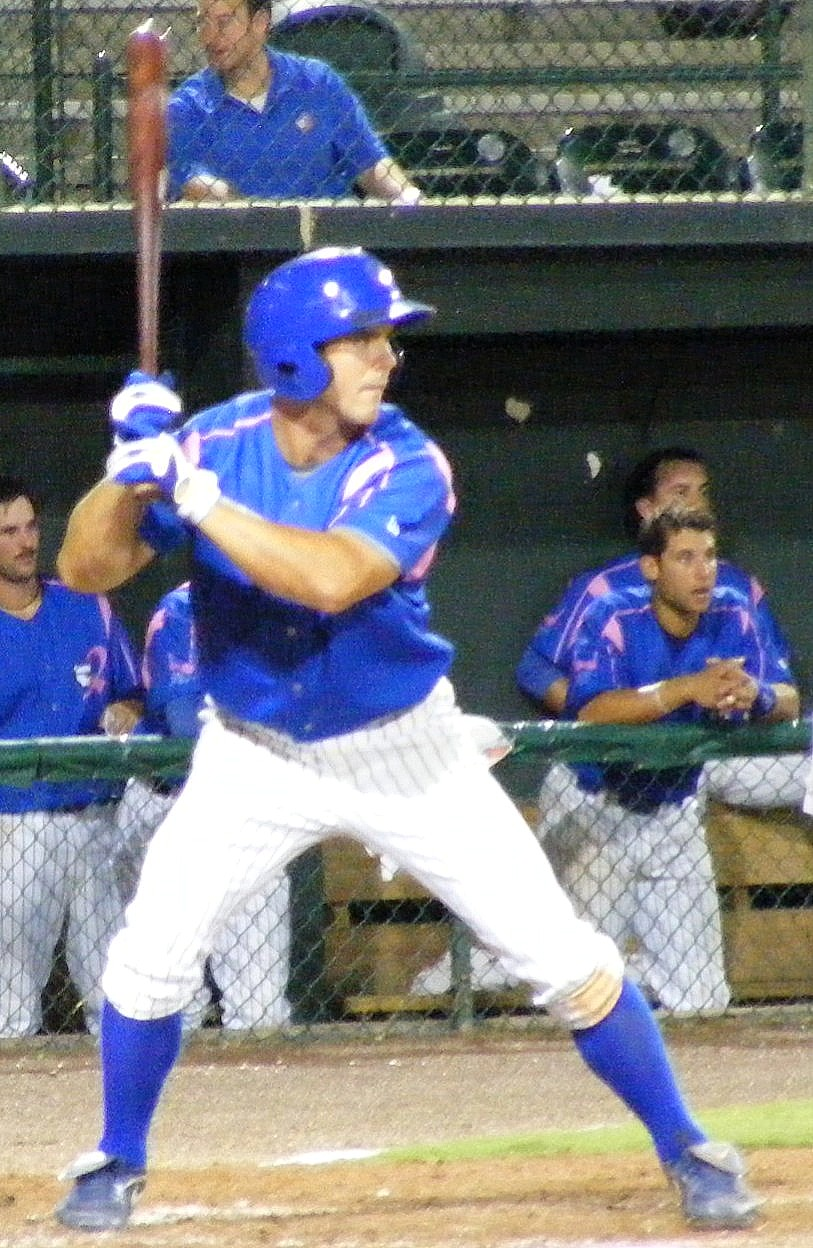
Szczur batting for the Daytona Cubs in 2011

==== Major leagues ====
On August 16, 2014, Szczur was promoted to the major leagues for the first time. He made his MLB debut the next day. Szczur recorded his first Major League hit on August 21 against Madison Bumgarner of the San Francisco Giants. He recorded his first career home run on September 13 against Justin Wilson of the Pittsburgh Pirates.

Szczur split time during the 2015 season between Triple–A and the Majors, ultimately being called up by the Cubs on seven occasions. He finished the year hitting .222/.278/.333 in 47 major league games.

On April 29, 2016, he hit his first career Major League grand slam against Chris Withrow of the Atlanta Braves in the 8th inning, putting the Cubs up 6–1. In 2016, Szczur played in 107 games batting .259 with five home runs and 24 RBI. Szczur made no appearances during the Cubs World Series run nor was he on the World Series roster, but still earned his first career championship. Szczur was designated for assignment by the Cubs after only playing in 15 games on May 6, 2017.

=== San Diego Padres ===
The Cubs traded Szczur to the San Diego Padres in exchange for Justin Hancock on May 8, 2017. Szczur played in 104 games for San Diego in 2017, batting .227/.358/.364 with three home runs and 15 RBI. In 2018 with San Diego, Szczur hit .187 in 57 games. On July 1, 2018, he was designated for assignment by San Diego and sent outright to the Triple–A El Paso Chihuahuas. He declared free agency on October 2.

=== Arizona Diamondbacks ===
On December 14, 2018, Szczur signed a minor league contract with the Arizona Diamondbacks organization. Szczur spent the year with the Triple-A Reno Aces, also playing in 3 games for the AZL Diamondbacks, slashing .313/.380/.569 with eight home runs and 29 RBI. He elected free agency following the season on November 4.

=== Philadelphia Phillies ===
Szczur signed a minor league contract with the Philadelphia Phillies on December 13, 2019, with an invite to major-league spring training camp. Szczur did not play in a game in 2020 due to the cancellation of the minor league season because of the COVID-19 pandemic. Szczur was released by the Phillies organization on June 28, 2020.

=== St. Louis Cardinals ===
On February 13, 2021, Szczur signed a minor league contract with the St. Louis Cardinals organization that included an invitation to Spring Training. In 30 games with the Triple-A Memphis Redbirds, Szczur hit only .186/.236/.382 with five home runs and 11 RBI. Szczur was released by the Cardinals organization on June 28, 2021.

On March 7, 2022, Szczur announced his retirement from professional baseball.

== Personal life ==
In 2009, Szczur donated bone marrow to a 15-month-old Ukrainian girl named Anastasia battling leukemia. Szczur essentially saved the girl's life given the severity of her condition and how hard it would have been to find another person that was a match for bone marrow. He met the healthy 4-year-old girl and her parents via Skype using a translator who was present at Anastasia's house. It was documented in E:60 Risking it All, which is one of ESPN's E:60 presentations.

Szczur and his wife, Natalie, were married in November 2014 in Philadelphia, Pennsylvania. They have two children, a son and a daughter.

After retiring from baseball, Szczur gained a following on Instagram and TikTok, where he posted videos of his paintings.
