= 2009 Rhode Island Rams football team =

American college football season

2009 Rhode Island Rams football
- Conference: Colonial Athletic Association
- North Division
- Record: 1–10 (0–8 CAA)
- Head coach: Joe Trainer (1st season)
- Offensive coordinator: Chris Pincince (2nd season)
- Defensive coordinator: Rob Neviaser (1st season)
- Home stadium: Meade Stadium

2009 Colonial Athletic Association football standings
	Conf.			Overall
Team	W		L	W		L
North Division
No. 7 New Hampshire x^	6	–	2	10	–	3
Maine	4	–	4	5	–	6
Hofstra	3	–	5	5	–	6
UMass	3	–	5	5	–	6
Northeastern	3	–	5	3	–	8
Rhode Island	0	–	8	1	–	10
South Division
No. 1 Villanova x+^	7	–	1	14	–	1
No. 5 Richmond x+^	7	–	1	11	–	2
No. 4 William & Mary ^	6	–	2	11	–	3
Delaware	4	–	4	6	–	5
James Madison	4	–	4	6	–	5
Towson	1	–	7	2	–	9
+ – Conference co-champions; x – Division champion/co-champions; ^ – FCS playoff participant; Rankings from The Sports Network poll

The 2009 Rhode Island Rams football team represented the University of Rhode Island in the 2009 NCAA Division I FCS football season as a member of the Colonial Athletic Association (CAA). The Rams were led by first year head coach Joe Trainer and played their home games at Meade Stadium. They finished the season with one win and ten losses (1–10, 0–8 in CAA play) and finished in last place in the conference.

== Schedule ==
Date	Time	Opponent	Site	TV	Result	Attendance	Source
September 5	1:00 pm	Fordham*	Meade Stadium; Kingston, RI		W 41–28	2,731	
September 19	3:30 pm	at No. 17 UMass*	McGuirk Stadium; Hadley, MA	CSN	L 10–30	12,124	
September 26	12:00 pm	at Connecticut*	Rentschler Field; East Hartford, CT (rivalry)	ESPN360	L 10–52	38,620	
October 3	12:30 pm	at Brown*	Brown Stadium; Providence, RI (rivalry)		L 20–28	3,214	
October 10	1:00 pm	Towson	Meade Stadium; Kingston, RI		L 28–36	3,314	
October 17	12:00 pm	Hofstra^{†}	Meade Stadium; Kingston, RI		L 16–28	5,159	
October 24	3:30 pm	at No. 4 Villanova	Villanova Stadium; Villanova, PA		L 7–36	5,517	
October 31	1:00 pm	No. 5 William & Mary	Meade Stadium; Kingston, RI		L 14–39	5,117	
November 7	12:00 pm	at No. 8 New Hampshire	Cowell Stadium; Durham, NH	CSN	L 42–55	4,643	
November 14	12:00 pm	at Maine	Alfond Stadium; Orono, ME		L 17–41	3,517	
November 21	12:30 pm	Northeastern	Meade Stadium; Kingston RI		L 27–33	2,610	
*Non-conference game; ^{†}Homecoming; Rankings from The Sports Network Poll released prior to the game; All times are in Eastern time

== Coaching staff ==
Rhode Island Rams
Name	Position	Consecutive season at Rhode Island in current position	Previous position
Joe Trainer	Head coach	1st	Rhode Island associate head coach and defensive coordinator (2008)
Roy Istvan	Assistant head coach and offensive line coach	1st	Rhode Island offensive line coach (2008)
Chris Pincince	Offensive coordinator	2nd	Holy Cross offensive coordinator (2006–2007)
Rob Neviaser	Defensive coordinator and defensive line coach	1st	Rhode Island defensive line coach (2008)
Eddie Allen	Special teams coordinator and running backs coach	2nd	Rutgers graduate assistant (2005–2007)
Ryan Crawford	Defensive backs coach	2nd	Bucknell defensive backs coach (2005–2007)
Tem Lukabu	Linebackers coach	1st	Rhode Island outside linebackers coach (2008)
Bob Griffin	Tight ends coach	2nd	Holy Cross co-offensive coordinator (2004–2005)
Ryan Roeder	Wide receivers coach	1st	Temple wide receivers coach (2008)
Ari Confesor	Assistant defensive backs coach	1st	Holy Cross wide receiver (player) (2000–2003)
