= 2009 Delaware Fightin' Blue Hens football team =

American college football season

2009 Delaware Fightin' Blue Hens football
- Conference: Colonial Athletic Association
- South Division
- Record: 6–5 (4–4 CAA)
- Head coach: K. C. Keeler (8th season)
- Offensive coordinator: Jim Hofher (1st season)
- Offensive scheme: Spread
- Defensive coordinator: Nick Rapone (4th season)
- Base defense: 4–3
- Home stadium: Delaware Stadium

2009 Colonial Athletic Association football standings
	Conf.			Overall
Team	W		L	W		L
North Division
No. 7 New Hampshire x^	6	–	2	10	–	3
Maine	4	–	4	5	–	6
Hofstra	3	–	5	5	–	6
UMass	3	–	5	5	–	6
Northeastern	3	–	5	3	–	8
Rhode Island	0	–	8	1	–	10
South Division
No. 1 Villanova x+^	7	–	1	14	–	1
No. 5 Richmond x+^	7	–	1	11	–	2
No. 4 William & Mary ^	6	–	2	11	–	3
Delaware	4	–	4	6	–	5
James Madison	4	–	4	6	–	5
Towson	1	–	7	2	–	9
+ – Conference co-champions; x – Division champion/co-champions; ^ – FCS playoff participant; Rankings from The Sports Network poll

The 2009 Delaware Fightin' Blue Hens football team represented the University of Delaware as a member of the South Division of the Colonial Athletic Association (CAA) during the 2009 NCAA Division I FCS football season. Led by eighth-year head coach K. C. Keeler, the Fightin' Blue Hens compiled an overall record of 6–5 with a mark of 4–4 in conference play, tying for fourth place in the CAA's South Division. The team played home games at Delaware Stadium in Newark, Delaware.

== Recruiting ==
The biggest coup for the University of Delaware in the off-season was the addition of quarterback Pat Devlin, a transfer from Penn State and former high school All-American out of Downingtown East High School. In high school Devlin is Pennsylvania's all-time leading passer with 8,162 yards. He was named the 2005 Pennsylvania Class AAA Player of the Year and the Gatorade Pennsylvania Player of the Year and earned a No. 4 ranking among prep quarterbacks nationally by Scout.com. He also was a named a Parade magazine All-American and played in the prestigious Big 33 Football Classic. Delaware also signed 20 recruits including four defensive linemen, four offensive linemen, three defensive backs, three linebackers, two running backs, two wide receivers, one quarterback, and one tight end. The recruits hail from seven states, including five from Pennsylvania, four each from New Jersey and Florida, three from Maryland, two from Virginia, and one each from Delaware and New York. The 2009 class matched the all-time high total of 20 signed by Coach Keeler in 2006.

== Schedule ==
Date	Time	Opponent	Rank	Site	TV	Result	Attendance	Source
September 4	7:00 pm	No. 14 (D-II) West Chester*		Delaware Stadium; Newark, DE (rivalry)		W 35–0	22,006	
September 12	3:30 pm	No. 1 Richmond		Delaware Stadium; Newark, DE	TCN	L 15–16	20,800	
September 19	12:00 pm	Delaware State*		Delaware Stadium; Newark, DE (Route 1 Rivalry)	WHYY	W 27–17	20,585	
September 26	7:00 pm	at No. 5 William & Mary		Zable Stadium; Williamsburg, VA (rivalry)		L 20–30	12,259	
October 3	6:00 pm	at Maine		Morse Field; Orono, ME	WABI	W 27–17	4,314	
October 10	6:00 pm	No. 12 UMass		Delaware Stadium; Newark, DE		W 43–27	22,034	
October 17	3:30 pm	at Towson	No. 23	Johnny Unitas Stadium; Towson, MD		W 49–21	6,026	
October 31	12:00 pm	James Madison^{†}	No. 16	Delaware Stadium; Newark, DE (rivalry)	TCN	L 8–20	20,639	
November 7	12:00 pm	Hofstra	No. 23	Delaware Stadium; Newark, DE		W 28–24	18,433	
November 14	3:30 pm	at Navy*	No. 23	Navy–Marine Corps Memorial Stadium; Annapolis, MD	CBSCS	L 18–35	34,223	
November 21	3:30 pm	at No. 2 Villanova	No. 25	Villanova Stadium; Villanova, PA (Battle of the Blue)	TCN	L 12–30	12,073	
*Non-conference game; ^{†}Homecoming; Rankings from The Sports Network Poll released prior to the game; All times are in Eastern time

== Game summaries ==
=== West Chester ===
	1	2	3	4	Total
#17 (D-II) West Chester	0	0	0	0	0
Delaware	7	14	14	0	35

After two years as a backup quarterback at Penn State, Pat Devlin made his debut as starting quarterback for the Blue Hens. Devlin completed 12 of 15 passes for 227 yards with two touchdown passes and also ran for a third. The Fightin' Blue Hens defense held the West Chester offense, ranked #17 in Division 2, to 176 total yards while securing the shutout. Mark Mackey led the team with 83 receiving yards, while redshirt freshman David Hayes rushed for 57. With a comfortable 35–0 lead in the third quarter, the Blue Hens brought out the backups.

=== Richmond ===
	1	2	3	4	Total
#1 Richmond	0	7	0	9	16
Delaware	5	3	7	0	15

Delaware squared off against #1 Richmond on Saturday September 12 in front of 20,000 plus fans, with the Spiders coming off a big win over the Duke Blue Devils. Delaware's defense opened the scoring by forcing a punt which resulted in a muffed snap that went over the Richmond punters head in the end zone. The punter kicked the ball out of the back of the end zone to prevent a Delaware touchdown, and UD took a 2–0 lead. On the ensuing drive the Blue Hens managed to get into field goal range and made the score 5–0. After another UD field goal put them up 8–0, Richmond drove down the field with the half winding down and scored a touchdown to cut the lead to 8–7. After trading defensive stops, UD forced a fumble in the red zone and the offense punched it in for touchdown putting Delaware up 15–7. Richmond was able to drive down the field in the 4th quarter for a touchdown and went for a 2-point conversion to tie it, but the conversion failed and Delaware led 15–13. Richmond again managed to get down the field and the Delaware defense again held them to a field goal, putting Richmond ahead 16–15. After defensive stops by both teams, the Richmond punter muffed a punt that failed to cross the 50. With the excellent field position, Pat Devlin completed a pair of passes to get Delaware to the 12-yard line with under 2 minutes to play. After three straight rushing plays to run time off the clock, UD set up for the field goal with 32 seconds to play. The Richmond defense however was able to block the 29-yard field goal attempt to preserve a close 16–15 win in a hard fought CAA game. The blocked field goal made ESPN's Top Ten Highlights for Saturday as the #2 play of the day.

=== Delaware State ===
	1	2	3	4	Total
Delaware State	3	0	0	14	17
Delaware	7	0	7	13	27

In the first regular season meeting between the two schools in the new Route 1 Rivalry, over 20,000 fans were in attendance for the noon kickoff of the intrastate game. The first quarter saw UD score a touchdown on their opening drive, a 1-yard rush by quarterback Pat Devlin at the 7:41 mark of the first quarter. The drive had initially stalled and kicker John Striefsky had missed a 42-yard field goal attempt wide left, however, the Delaware State Hornets were called for a personal foul on the play, giving UD 15 yards and a first down. The Hornets answered by driving down the field themselves, but had to settle for a 42-yard field goal by kicker Riley Flickinger, a career long. After trading punts several times and a 44-yard field goal attempt by Delaware State missed wide right, the Blue Hens were able to move the ball to the 1-yard line with 1.5 seconds left in the first half. The Blue Hens decided to go for the touchdown and the Hornets made a goal line stop as time expired in the first half with the aid of a questionable call by the officials. In the second half the offenses again moved the ball up and down the field but were still unable to punch it in for a score, with Delaware State reaching the Blue Hens 18-yard line before an interception. Late in the third Delaware took over the ball at their own 30-yard line after stopping the Hornets on downs and executed a 4 play 70-yard drive for a touchdown that again ended with a Pat Devlin 1-yard run to extend the lead to 14–3. Delaware State again moved into Blue Hens territory for the third straight time, but again turned the ball over as a fumble by Jason Randall on the Delaware 25-yard line was recovered by UD and returned to the 41. The Hens then drove down the field on five plays ending with a Pat Devlin 17-yard touchdown pass to freshman Rob Jones, increasing the lead to 21–7. Delaware State attempted to answer back, driving down the field into scoring range only to turn the ball over again after a Flickinger's 35-yard field goal attempt was blocked. Delaware State finally got a break, however, as on the ensuing drive Pat Devlin's pass went off the hands of a receiver and was intercepted by free safety Jerome Strums who raced 71 yards down the field for the Hornets first touchdown, cutting into the lead 21–10. After an excellent kickoff return, UD needed just 3 plays to pick up 23 yards for another touchdown as Leon Jackson rushed for a 3-yard touchdown making it 27–10 with 3:36 left in the game. Delaware State was able to muster one final drive as Delaware State quarterback Anthony Glaud kept the ball himself for a 1-yard rushing touchdown with 31 seconds left in the game to complete the scoring at 27–21.

=== William & Mary ===
	1	2	3	4	Total
Delaware	0	7	0	13	20
#5 William & Mary	14	3	6	7	30

The #5 William & Mary Tribe put up 458 total yards of offense, including a 91-yard touchdown pass to set a record as the longest in school history, in their 30–20 victory over UD. The Tribe scored first on the 91-yard pass as W&M receiver Chase Hill got by the Blue Hens corner Marcus Burley, who was making his first career start in place of the injured Tyrone Grant. Hill would again beat Burley for the Tribe's second touchdown. The Fightin' Blue Hens were held to −2 yards rushing, the first time they were held to negative yardage rushing since a playoff game against Grambling in 1973. Although statistically Pat Devlin had a good performance, finishing 33–49 for 302 yards and 3 touchdowns, Delaware scored only 1 touchdown before the final 2:37 of the game. The William & Mary defense forced Delaware to punt 9 times in their first 11 possessions.

=== Maine ===
	1	2	3	4	Total
Delaware	7	7	7	6	27
Maine	7	7	3	0	17

The Fightin' Blue Hens managed to bounce back from a their loss to William & Mary and secure their first conference win in Orono, Maine against the Black Bears. UD quarterback Pat Devlin passed for 329 yards and a touchdown, a 79-yard pass in the first quarter to Mark Duncan who had missed the previous game to William & Mary. Duncan finished with four receptions for 145 yards to lead all UD receivers. Running back David Hayes led the way for the Hens ground game with 106 yards rushing including a 25-yard touchdown, while Leon Jackson added 61 yards on 23 carries for two touchdowns, including the go ahead score on a 2-yard run to put Delaware in the lead for good. Maine quarterback Warren Smith was 23-for-36 with 258 yards passing, and threw two touchdowns but had two interceptions for the Black Bears. Landis Williams led the Maine offense catching 10 passes for 104 yards.

=== UMass ===
	1	2	3	4	Total
#12 UMass	3	0	3	21	27
Delaware	20	3	14	6	43

Pat Devlin threw four touchdown passes as the unranked University of Delaware Fightin' Blue Hens defeated the #12 Massachusetts Minutemen 43–27. The scoring began with a 15-yard touchdown pass to Mark Mackey, however, UMass was able to block the PAT. Three minutes later, Delaware again drove down the field ending with a 22-yard touchdown pass to Mark Duncan. On the ensuing UMass drive, Marc Burley recovered a fumble and returned it 42-yards for a touchdown to give Delaware a 20 to 0 lead. On their final drive of the quarter, UMass was able to drive down the field and set up Armando Cuko for a 51-yard field goal to bring the score to 20–3. The second quarter saw UD's Jon Striefsky hit a 22-yard field goal to bring the score to 23–3 heading into halftime. In the third quarter, Armando Cuko hit a 37-yard field goal to bring the score to 23–6. Delaware quickly answered with Pat Devlin throwing a 4-yard touchdown pass to Trevor Mooney and a 27-yard touchdown pass to Mark Duncan, giving Delaware a 37–6 lead. In the fourth quarter, UMass got the offense going with mainly backups playing. Kyle Havens threw a 4-yard touchdown to Andrew Krevis early in the fourth and Delaware drove back down the field leading to another Striefsky field goal from 24 yards out, making the score 40–13. Emil Igwenagu then caught a 52-yard pass from Kyle Havens as UMass closed the gap to 40–20, but UD was able to use up several minutes of the game clock as the drove down the field for a 23-yard Striefsky field goal to give Delaware a 43–20 lead. With under a minute to play, UMass scored for the final time on a 20-yard pass from Scott Woodward to Aaron Frears to end the scoring at 43–27. Striefsky's three field goals tied the schools season game record on the same night he set the record for most field goals in a career with 33. The win snapped an 8-game losing streak to top 25 opponents for the Blue Hens.

=== Towson ===
	1	2	3	4	Total
#23 Delaware	7	28	14	0	49
Towson	0	0	0	21	21

The #23 Fightin' Blue Hens cruised to a 49–21 victory over Towson in the rain on October 17. The Blue Hens were up 49–0 before Towson scored their first points in their homecoming game. Quarterback Pat Devlin completed 9 of 15 passes for 127 yards and two touchdowns. Running back Leon Jackson scored three rushing touchdowns, including a 2-yard run on the opening drive that completed an 11-play 80-yard drive. After forcing Towson to punt from their own 6, Delaware started from the Towson 26-yard line and Devlin found wide receiver Mark Duncan on the next play for a 14–0 lead with 12:57 remaining in the half. On the ensuing drive, Delaware drove down the field and Jackson again punched it in from 2-yards out. Delaware scored again on a 43-yard pass from Devlin to Duncan and capped the first half when free safety Charles Graves returned an interception 90 yards for a touchdown and a 35–0 lead. To open the second half, Delaware's Jerry Butler returned the kickoff 89 yards for a touchdown. At the end of the third quarter Jackson rushed 1-yard to end Delaware's scoring with a 49–0 lead. Tigers running back Dominique Booker and backup quarterback Tom Chroniger each got their first career touchdowns for Towson in the fourth quarter. Tremayne Dameron later added a 1-yard touchdown run to finish the game at 49–21.

=== James Madison ===
	1	2	3	4	Total
James Madison	0	0	13	7	20
#16 Delaware	0	3	3	2	8

Quarterback Pat Devlin was sacked eight times and intercepted twice as the #16 Blue Hens playoff chances were dealt a major blow in a rainy homecoming game. The James Madison Dukes came into Delaware Stadium with a 1–5 record and had not won in Newark since 1994. The only scoring in the first half for either team came on a 34-yard field goal early in the second quarter by Delaware's John Striefsky. Early in the first quarter the Blue Hens had attempted a fake field goal from the James Madison 9-yard line, but were stopped short of the first down. The Dukes took a 7–3 lead on the first drive of the third quarter when quarterback Justin Thorpe rushed into the endzone on a 12-yard option keeper to close a six-play, 75-yard drive. Striefsky kicked a 31-yard field goal to bring Delaware back within 7–6, however JMU answered back, with Thorpe throwing 7 yards to tight end Charlie Newman with 3:18 left in the third quarter for the touchdown. A 53-yard pass to Rockeed McCarter set up the touchdown, however the Dukes missed the extra point and led 13–6. James Madison drove 83 yards on 14 plays to score on Jamal Sullivan's 3-yard rush with under 10 minutes left in the fourth quarter to stretch the lead to 20–6. The Dukes defense then held off the Blue Hens offense and an intentional safety by the Dukes completed the scoring for a 20–8 loss for the Blue Hens.

=== Hofstra ===
	1	2	3	4	Total
Hofstra	0	14	10	0	24
#23 Delaware	7	14	0	7	28

=== Navy ===
	1	2	3	4	Total
#23 Delaware	3	6	3	6	18
(FBS) Navy	7	0	7	21	35

=== Villanova ===
	1	2	3	4	Total
#25 Delaware	0	3	3	6	12
Villanova	10	10	7	3	30

== Roster ==
2009 Delaware Fightin' Blue Hens football team roster
Players
Coaches
Offense

Pos.	#	Name	Class
TE	2	Josh Baker	Sr
QB	17	Pat Devlin	Jr
OL	78	Sam Burrows	So
OL	79	Nick Cattolico	Fr
WR	89	Jim Roche	So

Defense

Pos.	#	Name	Class
DB	1	Tyrone Grant	Jr

Special teams

Pos.	#	Name	Class
P	13	Ed Wagner	Jr

Head coach

K. C. Keeler

Coordinators/assistant coaches

- Jim Hofher
  Offensive coordinator / quarterbacks
- Damian Wroblewski
  Offensive line / Assistant head coach
- Ben Albert
  Linebackers

Legend

- (C) Team captain
- (S) Suspended
- (I) Ineligible
- Injured
- Redshirt

Roster
