= 2009 Towson Tigers football team =

American college football season

2009 Towson Tigers football
- Conference: Colonial Athletic Association
- Record: 2–9 (1–7 CAA)
- Head coach: Rob Ambrose (1st season)
- Home stadium: Johnny Unitas Stadium

2009 Colonial Athletic Association football standings
	Conf.			Overall
Team	W		L	W		L
North Division
No. 7 New Hampshire x^	6	–	2	10	–	3
Maine	4	–	4	5	–	6
Hofstra	3	–	5	5	–	6
UMass	3	–	5	5	–	6
Northeastern	3	–	5	3	–	8
Rhode Island	0	–	8	1	–	10
South Division
No. 1 Villanova x+^	7	–	1	14	–	1
No. 5 Richmond x+^	7	–	1	11	–	2
No. 4 William & Mary ^	6	–	2	11	–	3
Delaware	4	–	4	6	–	5
James Madison	4	–	4	6	–	5
Towson	1	–	7	2	–	9
+ – Conference co-champions; x – Division champion/co-champions; ^ – FCS playoff participant; Rankings from The Sports Network poll

The 2009 Towson Tigers football team represented Towson University in the 2009 NCAA Division I FCS football season. They were led by first-year head coach Rob Ambrose and played their home games at Johnny Unitas Stadium. They are a member of the Colonial Athletic Association. They finished the season 2–9, 1–7 in CAA play.

== Schedule ==
Date	Time	Opponent	Site	TV	Result	Attendance	Source
September 5	11:00 am	at Northwestern*	Ryan Field; Evanston, IL	Big Ten Network	L 14–47	17,857	
September 19	7:00 pm	Coastal Carolina*	Johnny Unitas Stadium; Towson, MD		W 21–17	7,628	
September 26	4:00 pm	at Morgan State*	Hughes Stadium; Baltimore, MD (The Battle for Greater Baltimore)		L 9–12		
October 3	3:30 pm	No. 6 New Hampshire	Johnny Unitas Stadium; Towson, MD	Comcast SportsNet	L 7–57	8,026	
October 10	1:00 pm	at Rhode Island	Meade Stadium; Kingston, RI		W 36–28	3,314	
October 17	3:30 pm	No. 23 Delaware^{†}	Johnny Unitas Stadium; Towson, MD		L 21–49	6,026	
October 24	1:00 pm	at Northeastern	Parsons Field; Brookline, MA		L 7–27	1,920	
October 31	1:00 pm	No. 1 Richmond	Johnny Unitas Stadium; Towson, MD		L 14–42	4,396	
November 7	1:30 pm	at No. 5 William & Mary	Zable Stadium; Williamsburg, VA		L 0–31	8,037	
November 14	1:00 pm	No. 2 Villanova	Villanova Stadium; Villanova, PA		L 7–49	5,339	
November 21	3:00 pm	at James Madison	Bridgeforth Stadium; Harrisonburg, VA		L 12–43	13,138	
*Non-conference game; ^{†}Homecoming; Rankings from The Sports Network Poll released prior to the game; All times are in Eastern time
