= 2009 Northeastern Huskies football team =

American college football season

2009 Northeastern Huskies football
- Conference: Colonial Athletic Association
- North Division
- Record: 3–8 (3–5 CAA)
- Head coach: Rocky Hager (6th season)
- Defensive coordinator: Frank Forcucci (1st season)
- Home stadium: Parsons Field

2009 Colonial Athletic Association football standings
	Conf.			Overall
Team	W		L	W		L
North Division
No. 7 New Hampshire x^	6	–	2	10	–	3
Maine	4	–	4	5	–	6
Hofstra	3	–	5	5	–	6
UMass	3	–	5	5	–	6
Northeastern	3	–	5	3	–	8
Rhode Island	0	–	8	1	–	10
South Division
No. 1 Villanova x+^	7	–	1	14	–	1
No. 5 Richmond x+^	7	–	1	11	–	2
No. 4 William & Mary ^	6	–	2	11	–	3
Delaware	4	–	4	6	–	5
James Madison	4	–	4	6	–	5
Towson	1	–	7	2	–	9
+ – Conference co-champions; x – Division champion/co-champions; ^ – FCS playoff participant; Rankings from The Sports Network poll

The 2009 Northeastern Huskies football team represented Northeastern University in the 2009 NCAA Division I FCS football season. Northeastern competed as a member of the Colonial Athletic Association (CAA) under head football coach Rocky Hager and played their home games at Parsons Field. The 2009 campaign was the final year that Northeastern fielded a football team. The decision to drop the program after this season cited financial problems, poor attendance, and very few winning seasons.

== Schedule ==
Date	Time	Opponent	Site	TV	Result	Attendance	Source
September 5	2:00 pm	at Boston College*	Alumni Stadium; Chestnut Hill, MA	ESPN360	L 0–54	33,262	
September 12	1:00 pm	No. 20 Maine	Parsons Field; Brookline, MA		L 7–17	1,528	
September 19	6:00 pm	Youngstown State*	Parsons Field; Brookline, MA		L 21–38	2,180	
September 26	3:30 pm	at No. 2 Villanova	Villanova Stadium; Villanova, PA		L 7–56	11,119	
October 3	1:00 pm	No. 21 Holy Cross*	Parsons Field; Brookline, MA		L 21–42	1,103	
October 10	1:00 pm	No. 8 William & Mary	Parsons Field; Brookline, MA		L 14–34	1,829	
October 24	1:00 pm	Towson^{†}	Parsons Field; Brookline, MA		W 27–7	1,920	
October 31	12:00 pm	at No. 8 New Hampshire	Cowell Stadium; Durham, NH		L 21–48	4,566	
November 7	12:00 pm	at UMass	Warren McGuirk Alumni Stadium; Hadley, MA		L 7–37	6,725	
November 14	1:00 pm	Hofstra	Parsons Field; Brookline, MA		W 14–13	1,017	
November 21	12:30 pm	at Rhode Island	Meade Stadium; Kingston, RI		W 33–27	2,610	
*Non-conference game; ^{†}Homecoming; Rankings from The Sports Network Poll released prior to the game; All times are in Eastern time
