= 2009 James Madison Dukes football team =

American college football season

2009 James Madison Dukes football
- Conference: Colonial Athletic Association
- South Division
- Record: 6–5 (4–4 CAA)
- Head coach: Mickey Matthews (11th season)
- Offensive coordinator: Jeff Durden (6th season)
- Defensive coordinator: Kyle Gillenwater (1st season)
- Home stadium: Bridgeforth Stadium

2009 Colonial Athletic Association football standings
	Conf.			Overall
Team	W		L	W		L
North Division
No. 7 New Hampshire x^	6	–	2	10	–	3
Maine	4	–	4	5	–	6
Hofstra	3	–	5	5	–	6
UMass	3	–	5	5	–	6
Northeastern	3	–	5	3	–	8
Rhode Island	0	–	8	1	–	10
South Division
No. 1 Villanova x+^	7	–	1	14	–	1
No. 5 Richmond x+^	7	–	1	11	–	2
No. 4 William & Mary ^	6	–	2	11	–	3
Delaware	4	–	4	6	–	5
James Madison	4	–	4	6	–	5
Towson	1	–	7	2	–	9
+ – Conference co-champions; x – Division champion/co-champions; ^ – FCS playoff participant; Rankings from The Sports Network poll

The 2009 James Madison Dukes football team represented James Madison University in the 2009 NCAA Division I FCS football season. JMU finished the season 6–5 with a record of 4–4 in the Colonial Athletic Association.

== Schedule ==
Date	Time	Opponent	Rank	Site	TV	Result	Attendance	Source
September 12	6:00 pm	at Maryland*	No. 6	Byrd Stadium; College Park, MD	ESPN360	L 35–38 ^{OT}	46,485	
September 19	6:00 pm	VMI*	No. 7	Bridgeforth Stadium; Harrisonburg, VA		W 44–16	15,951	
September 26	7:00 pm	at No. 25 Liberty*	No. 7	Williams Stadium; Lynchburg, VA		W 24–10	15,532	
October 3	3:00 pm	at Hofstra	No. 7	James M. Shuart Stadium; Hempstead, NY		L 17–24	2,751	
October 10	12:00 pm	No. 1 Richmond	No. 13	Bridgeforth Stadium; Harrisonburg, VA	CSN	L 17–21	16,098	
October 17	3:30 pm	No. 6 Villanova	No. 16	Bridgeforth Stadium; Harrisonburg, VA	TCN	L 0–27	16,037	
October 24	12:00 pm	at No. 5 William & Mary		Zable Stadium; Williamsburg, VA (rivalry)	CSN	L 3–24	12,259	
October 31	12:00 pm	at No. 16 Delaware		Delaware Stadium; Newark, DE (rivalry)	TCN	W 20–8	20,639	
November 7	3:00 pm	Maine		Bridgeforth Stadium; Harrisonburg, VA		W 22–14	15,303	
November 14	12:00 pm	at UMass		Warren McGuirk Alumni Stadium; Hadley, MA	TCN	W 17–14	4,028	
November 21	3:00 pm	Towson		Bridgeforth Stadium; Harrisonburg, VA		W 43–12	13,138	
*Non-conference game; Rankings from The Sports Network Poll released prior to the game; All times are in Eastern time
