= 2009 Hofstra Pride football team =

American college football season

2009 Hofstra Pride football
- Conference: Colonial Athletic Association
- North Division
- Record: 5–6 (3–5 CAA)
- Head coach: Dave Cohen (4th season)
- Offensive coordinator: Dave Patenaude (2nd season)
- Defensive coordinator: Rich Nagy (1st season)
- Home stadium: James M. Shuart Stadium

2009 Colonial Athletic Association football standings
	Conf.			Overall
Team	W		L	W		L
North Division
No. 7 New Hampshire x^	6	–	2	10	–	3
Maine	4	–	4	5	–	6
Hofstra	3	–	5	5	–	6
UMass	3	–	5	5	–	6
Northeastern	3	–	5	3	–	8
Rhode Island	0	–	8	1	–	10
South Division
No. 1 Villanova x+^	7	–	1	14	–	1
No. 5 Richmond x+^	7	–	1	11	–	2
No. 4 William & Mary ^	6	–	2	11	–	3
Delaware	4	–	4	6	–	5
James Madison	4	–	4	6	–	5
Towson	1	–	7	2	–	9
+ – Conference co-champions; x – Division champion/co-champions; ^ – FCS playoff participant; Rankings from The Sports Network poll

The 2009 Hofstra Pride football team represented Hofstra University as a member of the North Division of the Colonial Athletic Association during the 2009 NCAA Division I FCS football season. Led by fourth-year head coach Dave Cohen, the Pride compiled an overall record of 5–6 with a mark of 3–5 in conference play, placing in a three-way tie for third in the CAA's North Division. Hofstra played home games at James M. Shuart Stadium in Hempstead, New York.

The 2009 campaign was the final year that Hofstra fielded a football team. The university dropped the program to fund the Zucker School of Medicine.

== Schedule ==
Date	Time	Opponent	Site	TV	Result	Attendance	Source
September 5	7:00 p.m.	Stony Brook*	James M. Shuart Stadium; Hempstead, NY (Battle of Long Island)	FiOS1 / Big South Network	W 17–10	7,160	
September 12	1:00 p.m.	at Bryant*	Bulldog Stadium; Smithfield, RI		W 40–24	1,760	
September 19	3:30 p.m.	at No. 1 Richmond	University of Richmond Stadium; Richmond, VA		L 0–47	7,511	
September 26	7:00 p.m.	Western Michigan*	Waldo Stadium; Kalamazoo, MI		L 10–24	16,116	
October 3	3:00 p.m.	No. 7 James Madison	James M. Shuart Stadium; Hempstead, NY		W 24–17	2,751	
October 10	1:00 p.m.	Maine	James M. Shuart Stadium; Hempstead, NY		L 14–16		
October 17	12:00 p.m.	at Rhode Island	Meade Stadium; Kingston, RI		W 28–16	5,159	
October 24	3:00 p.m.	No. 9 New Hampshire	James M. Shuart Stadium; Hempstead, NY		L 10–18	3,386	
November 7	12:00 p.m.	at No. 23 Delaware	Delaware Stadium; Newark, DE		L 24–28	18,433	
November 14	1:00 p.m.	at Northeastern	Parsons Field; Boston, MA		L 13–14	1,017	
November 21	1:00 p.m.	UMass	James M. Shuart Stadium; Hempstead, NY		W 52–38	2,549	
*Non-conference game; Rankings from The Sports Network Poll released prior to the game; All times are in Eastern time

== Coaching staff ==
Hofstra Pride
Name	Position	Consecutive season at Hofstra in current position	Previous position
Dave Cohen	Head coach	4th	Delaware – Defensive coordinator (2002–2005)
Bill Durkin	Assistant head coach / offensive line	1st	Hofstra – Offensive line (2008)
Dave Patenaude	Offensive coordinator / quarterbacks	2nd	Hofstra – Quarterbacks (2007)
Rich Nagy	Defensive coordinator / linebackers	1st	Murray State – Defensive coordinator / linebackers (2006–2008)
Lyle Hemphill	Special teams coordinator / defensive backs	3rd	Hofstra – Assistant defensive backs (2006)
Kahmal Roy	Wide receivers	2nd	Hofstra – Assistant defensive backs (2007)
Antonio Smikle	Running backs	3rd	Rutgers – Quality control (2005–2006)
Kevin Mapp	Defensive line	1st	Hofstra – Defensive ends (2008)
Phil Armatas	Tight ends	1st	Marshall – Offensive graduate assistant (2008)
Douglas Goodwin	Assistant defensive line	1st	Boston College – Video coordinator (2007–2008)
Jack Mrozinski	Assistant defensive backs	1st	Muhlenberg – Safeties (2007–2008)

== Awards and honors ==
- First Team All-CAA – Luke Bonus
- Second Team All-CAA – Everette Benjamin, Aaron Weaver
- Third Team All-CAA – Derek Moore
