= 2009 Maine Black Bears football team =

American college football season

2009 Maine Black Bears football
- Conference: Colonial Athletic Association
- North Division
- Record: 4–7 (3–4 CAA)
- Head coach: Jack Cosgrove (17th season)
- Captains: Mike Brusko; Brandon McLaughlin; Jordan Stevens
- Home stadium: Alfond Stadium

2009 Colonial Athletic Association football standings
	Conf.			Overall
Team	W		L	W		L
North Division
No. 7 New Hampshire x^	6	–	2	10	–	3
Maine	4	–	4	5	–	6
Hofstra	3	–	5	5	–	6
UMass	3	–	5	5	–	6
Northeastern	3	–	5	3	–	8
Rhode Island	0	–	8	1	–	10
South Division
No. 1 Villanova x+^	7	–	1	14	–	1
No. 5 Richmond x+^	7	–	1	11	–	2
No. 4 William & Mary ^	6	–	2	11	–	3
Delaware	4	–	4	6	–	5
James Madison	4	–	4	6	–	5
Towson	1	–	7	2	–	9
+ – Conference co-champions; x – Division champion/co-champions; ^ – FCS playoff participant; Rankings from The Sports Network poll

The 2009 Maine Black Bears football team was an American football team that represented the University of Maine as a member of the Colonial Athletic Association (CAA) during the 2009 NCAA Division I FCS football season. In their 17th season under head coach Jack Cosgrove, the Black Bears compiled a 5–6 record (4–4 against conference opponents) and finished second in the CAA's North Division. Mike Brusko, Brandon McLaughlin, and Jordan Stevens were the team captains.

== Schedule ==
Date	Time	Opponent	Rank	Site	TV	Result	Attendance	Source
September 3		St. Cloud State*	No. 19	Alfond Stadium; Orono, ME		W 34–27 ^{OT}		
September 12	1:00 p.m.	at Northeastern	No. 20	Parsons Field; Brookline, MA		W 17–7	1,528	
September 19	4:00 p.m.	at Albany*	No. 20	University Field; Albany, NY		L 16–20	4,823	
September 26	7:00 p.m.	at Syracuse*		Carrier Dome; Syracuse, NY	TWCSN	L 24–41	35,632	
October 3	6:00 p.m.	Delaware		Alfond Stadium; Orono, ME	WABI	L 17–27	4,314	
October 10	1:00 p.m.	at Hofstra		James M. Shuart Stadium; Hempstead, NY		W 16–14		
October 17	12:00 p.m.	No. 1 Richmond		Alfond Stadium; Orono, ME	CSN	L 21–38	6,087	
October 31	3:30 p.m.	No. 19 UMass		Alfond Stadium; Orono, ME	CSN NE	W 19–9	3,562	
November 7	3:00 p.m.	at James Madison		Bridgeforth Stadium; Harrisonburg, VA		L 14–22	15,303	
November 14	12:00 p.m.	Rhode Island		Alfond Stadium; Orono, ME		W 41–17	3,517	
November 21	12:00 p.m.	at No. 11 New Hampshire		Cowell Stadium; Durham, NH (Battle for the Brice–Cowell Musket)	CSN	L 24–27	6,635	
*Non-conference game; Rankings from The Sports Network Poll released prior to the game; All times are in Eastern time
