= Andy Talley =

American football player and coach (born 1943)

Biographical details
- Born: April 6, 1943 (age 83); Bryn Mawr, PA

Playing career
- 1963–1966: Southern Connecticut State
- Position: Defensive back

Coaching career (HC unless noted)
- 1967–1968: Simsbury HS (CT) (assistant)
- 1969: Springfield (DB)
- 1970–1972: Middlebury (OB)
- 1973–1978: Brown (OB)
- 1979–1983: St. Lawrence
- 1985–2016: Villanova

Head coaching record
- Overall: 257–155–2
- Tournaments: 11–10 (NCAA D-I-AA/FCS playoffs); 1–1 (NCAA D-III playoffs)

Accomplishments and honors

Championships
- 1 NCAA Division I (2009); 2 ICAC (1982–1983); 2 Yankee (1989, 1991); 2 A-10 (1997, 2001); 2 CAA (2009, 2012)

Awards
- 5× AFCA Regional Coach of the Year (1982, 1991, 1997, 2008–2009); 2× New York Sportswriters/ECAC Coach of the Year (1982, 1991); 2× AFCA National Coach of the Year (1997, 2009); Eddie Robinson Award (1997); A-10 Coach of the Year (1997)

Records
- Winningest coach in Villanova history Winningest coach in CAA history
- College Football Hall of Fame; Inducted in 2020 (profile)

Andrew J. Talley (born April 6, 1943) is a retired American football coach. He served as the head football coach at St. Lawrence University in Canton, New York from 1979 to 1983 and Villanova University from 1985 to 2016, compiling a career college football coaching record of 257–155–2.

Talley was hired by Villanova in 1984 to revive the Wildcats football program, which had been dormant since 1980. In 1997, he won the AFCA Coach of the Year Award and the Eddie Robinson Award. Talley led his 2009 Villanova team to an NCAA Division I Football Championship. He is a 1967 graduate of Southern Connecticut State University, where he played college football as a defensive back. Talley was inducted into the College Football Hall of Fame as a coach in 2020.

== Head coaching record ==
Year	Team	Overall	Conference	Standing	Bowl/playoffs	TSN/STATS^{#}
St. Lawrence Saints (Independent College Athletic Conference) (1979–1983)
1979	St. Lawrence	3–6	1–3	4th		
1980	St. Lawrence	5–4	1–3	T–4th		
1981	St. Lawrence	5–4	2–2	T–3rd		
1982	St. Lawrence	10–1	4–0	1st	L NCAA Division III Semifinal	
1983	St. Lawrence	5–3–1	3–0–1	1st		
St. Lawrence:		28–18–1	11–8–1			
Villanova Wildcats (NCAA Division III independent) (1985–1986)
1985	Villanova	4–0				
1986	Villanova	8–1				
Villanova Wildcats (NCAA Division I-AA independent) (1987)
1987	Villanova	6–4				
Villanova Wildcats (Yankee Conference) (1988–1996)
1988	Villanova	5–5–1	4–4	T–3rd		
1989	Villanova	8–4	6–2	T–1st	L NCAA Division I-AA First Round	
1990	Villanova	6–5	5–3	T–2nd		
1991	Villanova	10–2	7–1	T–1st	L NCAA Division I-AA First Round	
1992	Villanova	9–3	6–2	2nd	L NCAA Division I-AA First Round	
1993	Villanova	3–8	1–7	6th (Mid-Atlantic)		
1994	Villanova	5–6	2–6	5th (Mid-Atlantic)		
1995	Villanova	3–8	2–6	5th (Mid-Atlantic)		
1996	Villanova	8–4	6–2	T–2nd (Mid-Atlantic)	L NCAA Division I-AA First Round	12
Villanova Wildcats (Atlantic 10 Conference) (1997–2006)
1997	Villanova	12–1	8–0	1st (Mid-Atlantic)	L NCAA Division I-AA Quarterfinal	1
1998	Villanova	6–5	4–4	T–2nd (Mid-Atlantic)		
1999	Villanova	7–4	6–2	3rd		
2000	Villanova	5–6	3–5	7th		
2001	Villanova	8–3	7–2	T–1st		20
2002	Villanova	11–4	6–3	3rd	L NCAA Division I-AA Semifinal	4
2003	Villanova	7–4	5–4	T–4th		25
2004	Villanova	6–5	3–5	4th (South)		
2005	Villanova	4–7	2–6	6th (South)		
2006	Villanova	6–5	5–3	2nd (South)		
Villanova Wildcats (Colonial Athletic Association) (2007–2016)
2007	Villanova	7–4	5–3	T–3rd (South)		
2008	Villanova	10–3	7–1	2nd (South)	L NCAA Division I Quarterfinal	6
2009	Villanova	14–1	7–1	T–1st (South)	W NCAA Division I Championship	1
2010	Villanova	9–5	5–3	T–3rd	L NCAA Division I Semifinal	3
2011	Villanova	2–9	1–7	10th		
2012	Villanova	8–4	6–2	T–1st	L NCAA Division I First Round	16
2013	Villanova	6–5	5–3	4th		
2014	Villanova	11–3	7–1	2nd	L NCAA Division I Quarterfinal	7
2015	Villanova	6–5	5–3	T–4th		
2016	Villanova	9–4	6–2	T–2nd	L NCAA Division I Second Round	11
Villanova:		229–137–1	142–93			
Total:		257–155–2				
National championship Conference title Conference division title or championship game berth
^{#}Rankings from final Sports Network Poll.

== See also ==
- List of college football career coaching wins leaders
