= 2009 Richmond Spiders football team =

American college football season

2009 Richmond Spiders football

CAA co-champion

FCS Quarterfinal, L 31–35 vs. Appalachian State
- Conference: Colonial Athletic Association
- South

Ranking
- Sports Network: No. 5
- FCS Coaches: No. 5
- Record: 11–2 (7–1 CAA)
- Head coach: Mike London (2nd season)
- Offensive coordinator: Mike Faragalli (2nd season)
- Defensive coordinator: Vic Shealy (1st season)
- Home stadium: University of Richmond Stadium

2009 Colonial Athletic Association football standings
	Conf.			Overall
Team	W		L	W		L
North Division
No. 7 New Hampshire x^	6	–	2	10	–	3
Maine	4	–	4	5	–	6
Hofstra	3	–	5	5	–	6
UMass	3	–	5	5	–	6
Northeastern	3	–	5	3	–	8
Rhode Island	0	–	8	1	–	10
South Division
No. 1 Villanova x+^	7	–	1	14	–	1
No. 5 Richmond x+^	7	–	1	11	–	2
No. 4 William & Mary ^	6	–	2	11	–	3
Delaware	4	–	4	6	–	5
James Madison	4	–	4	6	–	5
Towson	1	–	7	2	–	9
+ – Conference co-champions; x – Division champion/co-champions; ^ – FCS playoff participant; Rankings from The Sports Network poll

The 2009 Richmond Spiders football team represented the University of Richmond during the 2009 NCAA Division I FCS football season. Richmond competed as a member of the Colonial Athletic Association (CAA) under second-year head football coach Mike London and played its home games at University of Richmond Stadium. The 2009 campaign came on the heels of an NCAA Division I FCS national championship in 2008. With the win over William & Mary on November 21, the Spiders recorded their first ten-win regular season in school history.

== Schedule ==
Date	Time	Opponent	Rank	Site	TV	Result	Attendance	Source
September 5	7:00 pm	at Duke*	No. 2	Wallace Wade Stadium; Durham, NC		W 24–16	33,311	
September 12	3:30 pm	at Delaware	No. 1	Delaware Stadium; Newark, DE	CN	W 16–15	20,800	
September 19	3:00 pm	Hofstra	No. 1	University of Richmond Stadium; Richmond VA		W 47–0	7,511	
September 26	3:00 pm	VMI*	No. 1	University of Richmond Stadium; Richmond, VA		W 38–28	7,554	
October 10	12:00 pm	at No. 13 James Madison	No. 1	Bridgeforth Stadium; Harrisonburg, VA	CSN	W 21–17	16,098	
October 17	12:00 pm	at Maine	No. 1	Alfond Stadium; Orono, ME	CSN	W 38–21	6,087	
October 24	3:00 pm	No. 14 UMass	No. 1	University of Richmond Stadium; Richmond, VA		W 34–12	8,214	
October 31	1:00 pm	at Towson	No. 1	Johnny Unitas Stadium; Towson, MD		W 42–14	4,396	
November 7	3:30 pm	No. 4 Villanova^{†}	No. 1	University of Richmond Stadium; Richmond, VA	CSN	L 20–21	11,667	
November 14	1:00 pm	at Georgetown*	No. 4	Multi-Sport Field; Washington, DC		W 49–10	2,312	
November 21	12:00 pm	No. 5 William & Mary	No. 4	University of Richmond Stadium; Richmond, VA (Capital Cup)	CN	W 13–10	17,527	
November 28	1:00 pm	No. 9 Elon*	No. 4	University of Richmond Stadium; Richmond, VA (NCAA Division I First Round)		W 16–13	6,143	
December 5	7:00 pm	No. 5 Appalachian State*	No. 4	University of Richmond Stadium; Richmond, VA (NCAA Division I Quarterfinal)	ESPNGP	L 31–35	7,272	
*Non-conference game; ^{†}Homecoming; Rankings from The Sports Network Poll released prior to the game; All times are in Eastern time
