= 2009 UMass Minutemen football team =

American college football season

2009 UMass Minutemen football
- Conference: Colonial Athletic Association
- North Division
- Record: 5–6 (3–5 CAA)
- Head coach: Kevin Morris (1st season)
- Offensive coordinator: Brian Picucci (1st season)
- Offensive scheme: Pro-style
- Defensive coordinator: Keith Dudzinski (6th season)
- Base defense: 4–3
- Home stadium: Warren McGuirk Alumni Stadium

2009 Colonial Athletic Association football standings
	Conf.			Overall
Team	W		L	W		L
North Division
No. 7 New Hampshire x^	6	–	2	10	–	3
Maine	4	–	4	5	–	6
Hofstra	3	–	5	5	–	6
UMass	3	–	5	5	–	6
Northeastern	3	–	5	3	–	8
Rhode Island	0	–	8	1	–	10
South Division
No. 1 Villanova x+^	7	–	1	14	–	1
No. 5 Richmond x+^	7	–	1	11	–	2
No. 4 William & Mary ^	6	–	2	11	–	3
Delaware	4	–	4	6	–	5
James Madison	4	–	4	6	–	5
Towson	1	–	7	2	–	9
+ – Conference co-champions; x – Division champion/co-champions; ^ – FCS playoff participant; Rankings from The Sports Network poll

The 2009 UMass Minutemen football team represented the University of Massachusetts Amherst in the 2009 NCAA Division I FCS football season as a member of the Colonial Athletic Association. The team was coached by Kevin Morris and played its home games at Warren McGuirk Alumni Stadium in Hadley, Massachusetts. The 2009 season was Morris's first as head coach of the Minutemen, as Don Brown left the position in the offseason to become the defensive coordinator at Maryland. It was also the first year UMass finished with a losing record since joining the CAA, both overall (5–6) and in-conference (3–5).

== Schedule ==
Date	Time	Opponent	Rank	Site	TV	Result	Attendance	Source
September 5	7:10 p.m.	at Kansas State*		Snyder Family Stadium; Manhattan, KS		L 17–21	50,750	
September 12	6:00 p.m.	Albany*	No. 17	McGuirk Stadium; Hadley, MA		W 44–7	13,215	
September 19	3:30 p.m.	Rhode Island	No. 17	McGuirk Stadium; Hadley, MA	CSN NE	W 30–10	12,124	
September 26	6:00 p.m.	Stony Brook*	No. 15	McGuirk Stadium; Hadley, MA		W 44–17	16,122	
October 10	6:00 p.m.	at Delaware	No. 12	Delaware Stadium; Newark, DE		L 27–43	22,034	
October 17	3:30 p.m.	No. 4 New Hampshire^{†}	No. 18	McGuirk Stadium; Hadley, MA (rivalry)	CSN NE	W 23–17	13,108	
October 24	3:30 p.m.	at No. 1 Richmond	No. 14	UR Stadium; Richmond, VA		L 12–34	8,214	
October 31	3:30 p.m.	at Maine	No. 19	Alfond Stadium; Orono, ME	CSN NE	L 9–19	3,562	
November 7	12:00 p.m.	Northeastern		McGuirk Stadium; Hadley, MA		W 37–7	6,725	
November 14	12:00 p.m.	James Madison		McGuirk Stadium; Hadley, MA	CSN NE	L 14–17	4,028	
November 21	1:00 p.m.	at Hofstra		Shuart Stadium; Hempstead, NY		L 38–52	2,549	
*Non-conference game; ^{†}Homecoming; Rankings from The Sports Network Poll released prior to the game; All times are in Eastern time
