= R. J. Archer =

American gridiron football player (born 1987)

R.J. Archer
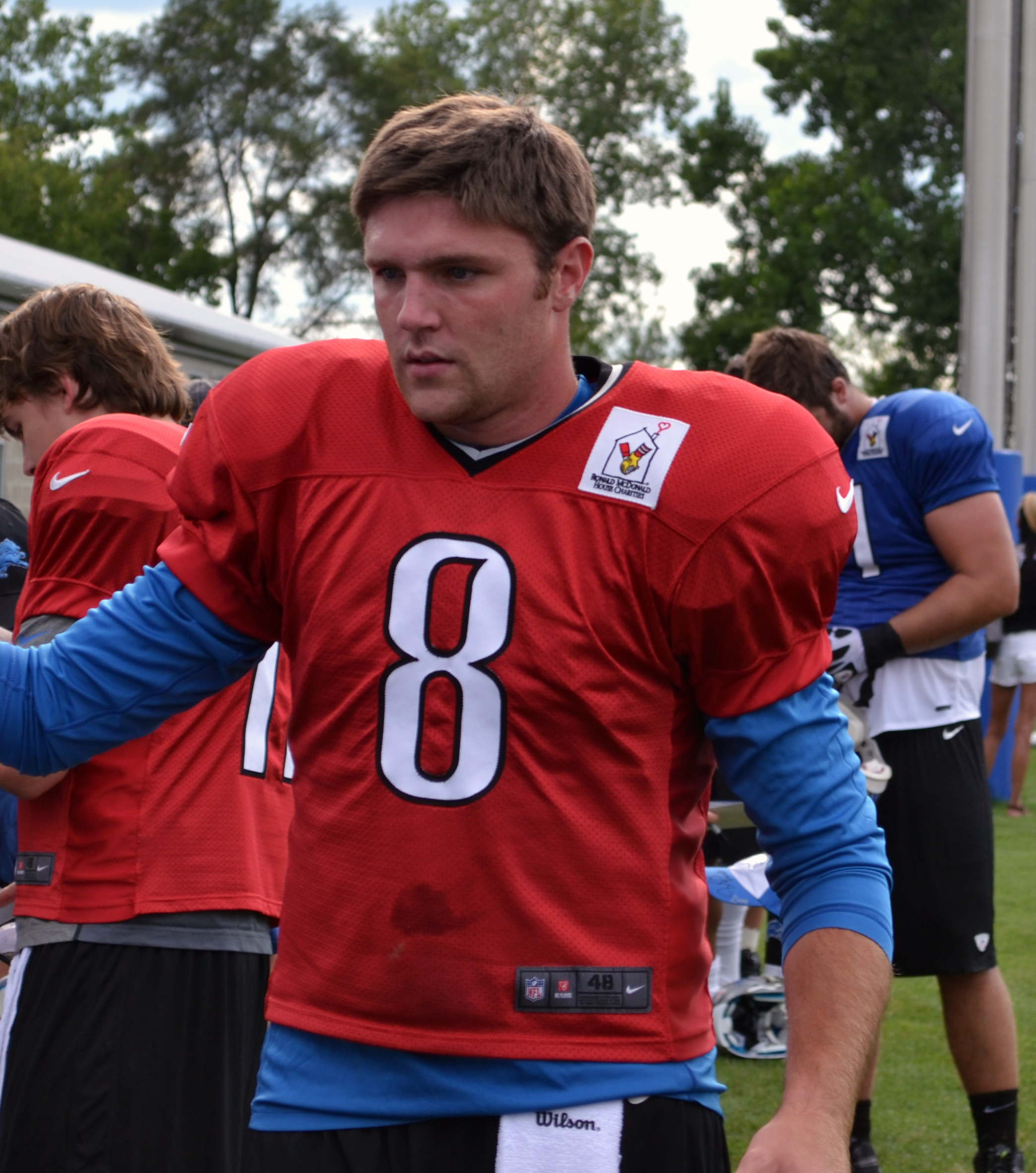
- Archer with the Detroit Lions in 2012

Profile
- Position: Quarterback

Personal information
- Born: August 5, 1987 (age 39); Charlottesville, Virginia, U.S.
- Listed height: 6 ft 2 in (1.88 m)
- Listed weight: 220 lb (100 kg)

Career information
- High school: Albemarle (Charlottesville)
- College: William & Mary (2005–2009)
- NFL draft: 2010: undrafted

Career history
- Minnesota Vikings (2010); Milwaukee Mustangs (2011); Georgia Force (2012); Detroit Lions (2012)*; Winnipeg Blue Bombers (2012); Jacksonville Sharks (2013–2014); Seattle Seahawks (2015)*; BC Lions (2015); Jacksonville Sharks (2016)
- * Offseason or practice squad member only

Career AFL statistics
- Comp. / Att.: 885 / 1,482
- Passing yards: 10,119
- TD–INT: 180–43
- Passer rating: 98.57
- Rushing TD: 12
- Stats at ArenaFan.com
- Stats at CFL.ca (archive)

Rush James "R. J." Archer II (born August 5, 1987) is an American former professional football quarterback who played in the Arena Football League (AFL) and Canadian Football League (CFL). He played college football for the William & Mary Tribe. Archer went undrafted in the 2010 NFL draft, afterwards signing with the Minnesota Vikings of the National Football League (NFL).

== Early life ==
Archer was a three-year starter at Albemarle High School. He holds the school's record for passing yards (4,568), touchdown passes (41), completions, and attempts.

== College career ==
Archer enrolled at The College of William & Mary and was redshirted his first year, during which time he ran the scout team. During the 2006 and 2007 seasons, he changed positions from quarterback to wide receiver, where he totaled 69 receptions. In 2008, he moved back to quarterback, but was not the full-time starter until the 2009 season when he threw for 16 touchdowns and nine interceptions.

== Professional career ==
Archer was rated the 17th best quarterback in the 2010 NFL draft by NFLDraftScout.com.

Pre-draft measurables
Height	Weight	40-yard dash	10-yard split	20-yard split	20-yard shuttle	Three-cone drill	Vertical jump	Broad jump
6 ft 1 in (1.85 m)	220 lb (100 kg)	4.80 s	1.66 s	2.76 s	4.27 s	7.10 s	34 in (0.86 m)	9 ft 4 in (2.84 m)
All values from William & Mary Pro Day

Archer went undrafted in the 2010 NFL draft, but was signed by the Vikings as an undrafted free agent. He was released prior to training camp on June 29. On November 10, 2010, Archer signed with the Spokane Shock of the Arena Football League.

With injuries to Vikings quarterbacks Brett Favre and Joe Webb, Minnesota re-signed him to the practice squad on December 7. He was subsequently placed on the Other League Exempt list by the Spokane Shock. He was elevated to the Vikings' 53-man roster on December 20 when quarterback Tarvaris Jackson was placed on injured reserve. He took the roster spot of guard Steve Hutchinson. The next day, it was reported that Archer was waived by the Vikings in favor of quarterback Rhett Bomar, who was signed off the practice squad of the New York Giants.

Archer played for the Milwaukee Mustangs of the Arena Football League in 2011 and the Georgia Force of the AFL in 2012.

On June 22, 2012, Archer was signed by the Detroit Lions. He was waived on August 23.

On October 11, 2012, Archer was added to the practice roster of the Winnipeg Blue Bombers of the CFL. He was promoted to the active roster on November 1 and dressed in one game for the Blue Bombers during the 2012 season but did not record any statistics.

From 2013 to 2014, Archer played for the Jacksonville Sharks of the Arena Football League, recording 104 touchdowns on 5,381 passing yards.

On February 9, 2015, Archer was signed by Seattle Seahawks. He was released on September 5, 2015.

On September 22, 2015, Archer signed with the BC Lions. He dressed in two games for the Lions but did not record any statistics. He was released following the season.

On December 3, 2015, the Sharks activated Archer from the other league exempt list.

== Career statistics ==
=== AFL ===
Year	Team	Passing							Rushing		
Year	Team	Cmp	Att	Pct	Yds	TD	Int	Rtg	Att	Yds	TD
2011	Milwaukee	219	367	59.7	2,334	27	14	80.81	18	35	5
2012	Georgia	228	380	60.0	2,404	49	12	97.52	7	43	1
2013	Jacksonville	72	102	70.6	741	12	3	108.33	7	28	0
2014	Jacksonville	366	633	57.8	4,640	92	14	107.93	20	43	6
Career		885	1,482	59.7	10,119	180	43	98.57	52	149	12

=== College ===
Year	Team	Passing							Rushing				Receiving		
Year	Team	Cmp	Att	Yds	Pct	TD	Int	Rtg	Att	Yds	Avg	TD	Rec	Yds	TD
2006	William & Mary	0	1	0	0.0	0	0	0.0	1	15	15.0	0	30	489	0
2007	William & Mary	1	3	25	33.3	0	0	103.3	1	−1	−1.0	0	39	451	1
2008	William & Mary	28	53	387	52.8	3	1	129.7	23	90	3.9	2	0	0	0
2009	William & Mary	261	433	2,778	60.3	16	9	122.2	100	255	2.5	5	0	0	0
Career		290	490	3,190	59.2	19	10	–	125	359	2.9	7	69	940	1
