= 2009 New Hampshire Wildcats football team =

American college football season

2009 New Hampshire Wildcats football

CAA North Division champion

FCS Quarterfinals, L 7–46 vs. Villanova
- Conference: Colonial Athletic Association
- North

Ranking
- Sports Network: No. 7
- FCS Coaches: No. 7
- Record: 10–3 (6–2 CAA)
- Head coach: Sean McDonnell (11th season)
- Offensive coordinator: Tim Cramsey (1st season)
- Home stadium: Cowell Stadium (Capacity: 6,500)

2009 Colonial Athletic Association football standings
	Conf.			Overall
Team	W		L	W		L
North Division
No. 7 New Hampshire x^	6	–	2	10	–	3
Maine	4	–	4	5	–	6
Hofstra	3	–	5	5	–	6
UMass	3	–	5	5	–	6
Northeastern	3	–	5	3	–	8
Rhode Island	0	–	8	1	–	10
South Division
No. 1 Villanova x+^	7	–	1	14	–	1
No. 5 Richmond x+^	7	–	1	11	–	2
No. 4 William & Mary ^	6	–	2	11	–	3
Delaware	4	–	4	6	–	5
James Madison	4	–	4	6	–	5
Towson	1	–	7	2	–	9
+ – Conference co-champions; x – Division champion/co-champions; ^ – FCS playoff participant; Rankings from The Sports Network poll

The 2009 New Hampshire Wildcats football team represented the University of New Hampshire during the 2009 NCAA Division I FCS football season. New Hampshire competede as a member of the Colonial Athletic Association (CAA) under head coach Sean McDonnell and played their home games at Cowell Stadium. They won the North Division of the CAA with a 9–2 (6–2 conference) record.

== Schedule ==
Date	Time	Opponent	Rank	Site	TV	Result	Attendance	Source
September 5	12:00 pm	St. Francis (PA)*	No. 8	Cowell Stadium; Durham, NH	UNHTV	W 24–14	6,330	
September 12	7:00 pm	at Ball State*	No. 9	Scheumann Stadium; Muncie, IN		W 23–16	11,884	
September 26	12:00 pm	Dartmouth*	No. 6	Cowell Stadium; Durham, NH (rivalry)	UNHTV	W 44–14	8,271	
October 3	3:30 pm	at Towson	No. 6	Johnny Unitas Stadium; Towson, MD	CSN	W 57–7	8,026	
October 10	12:00 pm	No. 2 Villanova^{†}	No. 5	Cowell Stadium; Durham, NH	UNHTV	W 28–24	14,811	
October 17	3:30 pm	at No. 18 UMass	No. 4	Warren McGuirk Alumni Stadium; Hadley, MA (rivalry)	CSN	L 17–23	13,108	
October 24	3:00 pm	at Hofstra	No. 9	James M. Shuart Stadium; Hempstead, NY		W 18–10	3,386	
October 31	12:00 pm	Northeastern	No. 8	Cowell Stadium; Durham, NH	UNHTV	W 48–21	4,566	
November 7	12:00 pm	Rhode Island	No. 8	Cowell Stadium; Durham, NH	UNHTV	W 55–42	4,643	
November 14	1:30 pm	at No. 5 William & Mary	No. 8	Zable Stadium; Williamsburg, VA		L 17–20	9,246	
November 21	12:00 pm	Maine	No. 11	Cowell Stadium; Durham, NH (Battle for the Brice–Cowell Musket)	CSN	W 27–24	6,635	
November 28	3:00 pm	at No. 8 McNeese State*	No. 10	Cowboy Stadium; Lake Charles, LA (NCAA Division I First Round)		W 49–13	10,009	
December 5	3:30 pm	at No. 2 Villanova*	No. 10	Villanova Stadium; Villanova, PA (NCAA Division I Quarterfinal)	CSN	L 7–46	2,661	
*Non-conference game; ^{†}Homecoming; Rankings from The Sports Network Poll released prior to the game; All times are in Eastern time
