= 2009 William & Mary Tribe football team =

American college football season

2009 William & Mary Tribe football

NCAA Division I Semifinal, L 13–14 vs. Villanova
- Conference: Colonial Athletic Association
- South Division

Ranking
- Sports Network: No. 4
- FCS Coaches: No. 3
- Record: 11–3 (6–2 CAA)
- Head coach: Jimmye Laycock (30th season)
- Offensive coordinator: Zbig Kepa (17th season)
- Defensive coordinator: Bob Shoop (3rd season)
- Captains: R. J. Archer; David Caldwell; Sean Lissemore; Adrian Tracy; Rob Varno
- Home stadium: Zable Stadium

2009 Colonial Athletic Association football standings
	Conf.			Overall
Team	W		L	W		L
North Division
No. 7 New Hampshire x^	6	–	2	10	–	3
Maine	4	–	4	5	–	6
Hofstra	3	–	5	5	–	6
UMass	3	–	5	5	–	6
Northeastern	3	–	5	3	–	8
Rhode Island	0	–	8	1	–	10
South Division
No. 1 Villanova x+^	7	–	1	14	–	1
No. 5 Richmond x+^	7	–	1	11	–	2
No. 4 William & Mary ^	6	–	2	11	–	3
Delaware	4	–	4	6	–	5
James Madison	4	–	4	6	–	5
Towson	1	–	7	2	–	9
+ – Conference co-champions; x – Division champion/co-champions; ^ – FCS playoff participant; Rankings from The Sports Network poll

The 2009 William & Mary Tribe football team represented the College of William & Mary during the 2009 NCAA Division I FCS football season. William & Mary competed as a member of the Colonial Athletic Association (CAA) under head football coach Jimmye Laycock and played their home games at Zable Stadium. The 2009 campaign came on the heels of a 7–4 record in 2008.

The 2009 Tribe football team finished the season ranked No. 4 in The Sports Network's final poll, which was the second highest final ranking William & Mary had ever earned; they finished No. 3 in 2004.

== Schedule ==
Date	Time	Opponent	Rank	Site	TV	Result	Attendance	Source
September 5	6:00 pm	at Virginia*	No. 14	Scott Stadium; Charlottesville, VA	ESPN360	W 26–14	54,587	
September 12	7:00 pm	Central Connecticut*	No. 7	Zable Stadium; Williamsburg, VA		W 33–14	9,546	
September 19	6:00 pm	at Norfolk State*	No. 5	William "Dick" Price Stadium; Norfolk, VA		W 27–15	10,005	
September 26	7:00 pm	Delaware	No. 5	Zable Stadium; Williamsburg, VA (rivalry)		W 30–20	12,259	
October 3	3:30 pm	at No. 2 Villanova	No. 5	Villanova Stadium; Villanova, PA	Versus	L 17–28	8,217	
October 10	1:00 pm	at Northeastern	No. 8	Parsons Field; Brookline, Massachusetts		W 34–14	1,829	
October 24	12:00 pm	James Madison^{†}	No. 5	Zable Stadium; Williamsburg, VA (rivalry)	CSN	W 24–3	12,259	
October 31	1:00 pm	at Rhode Island	No. 5	Meade Stadium; RI		W 39–14	5,117	
November 7	1:30 pm	Towson	No. 5	Zable Stadium; Williamsburg, VA		W 31–0	8,037	
November 14	1:30 pm	No. 8 New Hampshire	No. 5	Zable Stadium; Williamsburg, VA		W 20–17	9,246	
November 21	12:00 pm	at No. 4 Richmond	No. 5	University of Richmond Stadium; Richmond, VA (Capital Cup)	Comcast	L 10–13	17,527	
November 28	1:00 pm	No. 15 Weber State*	No. 6	Zable Stadium; Williamsburg, VA (NCAA Division I First Round)		W 38–0	6,497	
December 5	12:00 pm	at No. 1 Southern Illinois*	No. 6	McAndrew Stadium; Carbondale, IL (NCAA Division I Quarterfinal)	MASN	W 24–3	5,860	
December 11	8:00 pm	at No. 2 Villanova*	No. 6	Villanova Stadium; Villanova, PA (NCAA Division I Semifinal)	ESPN2	L 13–14	4,171	
*Non-conference game; ^{†}Homecoming; Rankings from The Sports Network Poll released prior to the game; All times are in Eastern time

== Season summary ==
=== Regular season ===
On September 5, William & Mary opened their season against their academic rivals, the Virginia Cavaliers (UVa) in Charlottesville. UVa, an FBS team, was expected to win handily. However, the Tribe forced a UVa school record-tying seven turnovers and won the game 26–14. It was William & Mary's first win over Virginia since 1986 and their first over an FBS school since 1998 (a 45–38 win over Temple). Tribe redshirt freshman cornerback B.W. Webb intercepted three passes, including a 50-yard pick six late in the fourth quarter to seal the victory. Webb was named the College Football National Defensive Player of the Week by the press. This selection marked the first time since the award's inception in 2001 that any player from an FCS school earned the distinction. Webb's game-sealing third interception was also chosen as SportsCenter's #5 play of the day on its daily Top 10 Plays segment.

The October 3rd match-up pitted the #5 Tribe against the #2 Villanova Wildcats. Both teams headed into the contest with 4–0 (1–0 CAA) records. The 3:30 p.m. game was broadcast live on the Versus network, making it the first-ever nationally televised CAA football game. Villanova won the game 28–17.

After defeating the #8 New Hampshire Wildcats on November 14, the Tribe tied their program's best record through 10 games since the 1947 season. The victory improved William & Mary's record to 5–0 at home on the season, marking the first time since 2004 that they had posted an undefeated regular season mark at Zable Stadium.

Capital Cup showdown

The I-64 Trophy, given to the winner of the annual rivalry game with Richmond (dubbed the I-64 Bowl), was replaced in 2009 with the Capital Cup, which honors the entire 118-game history of the rivalry (through 2008) between the schools and the status of the two cities as the last two capitals of the Commonwealth of Virginia. Both the trophy and game's names were changed to be called the Capital Cup. The 2009 edition turned out to be the most anticipated match-up in the long series' history. Both teams headed into the regular season finale with 9–1 (6–1 CAA) records, and each of the teams' single losses came to Villanova. The #5 Tribe had matched their best record through 10 games since the 1947 season, while the #4 Spiders were also looking for their first 10-win regular season in school history. The game contained not only playoff seeding ramifications, but a minimum share of the conference title was also on the line (the winner of the UR–W&M game would be the CAA's outright winner if #2 Villanova were to be upset by #25 Delaware).

The game was a defensive struggle as most possessions resulted in three-and-outs or, at most, one or two first downs. Tied at 10 apiece with less than 20 seconds remaining in the 4th quarter, William & Mary attempted one last play in Richmond territory to move close enough for a game-winning field goal. However, Tribe quarterback R. J. Archer threw an interception with 14 seconds left, giving the Spiders one last possession. After two pass completions covering close to 30 yards, Spiders kicker Andrew Howard converted a 48-yard field goal as time expired to give Richmond the win and a share of the conference title (Villanova would go on to win their game later that afternoon). Howard had only been 1-for-3 in field goal attempts prior to his game-winning kick.

=== Playoffs ===
With the loss, William & Mary finished the regular season 9–2 (6–2 CAA). When the FCS playoff bracket was announced, the #6 Tribe found out that they would be hosting the #15 Weber State Wildcats on November 28. In the first-ever meeting between the schools, William & Mary utilized a season-high four interceptions (two returned for touchdowns) to easily handle the Wildcats 38–0.

In the second round, William & Mary traveled to Carbondale, Illinois to take on the #1 ranked Southern Illinois Salukis. The Salukis boasted an offense that averaged more than 400 yards per game and over 34 points per game. After trailing 3–0 at the end of the first quarter, William & Mary's defense (#1 in the nation for rushing, #3 overall) stymied Southern Illinois for the remainder of the game and the Tribe stunned the host 24–3. The victory marked head coach Jimmye Laycock's 200th career victory (all at W&M), and also made him just the 13th FCS head coach to ever earn that many wins. It also helped the Tribe tie a single season school record of 11 wins which had been set back in 2004, the first and last time that they had reached the national semifinals.

On December 11 at 8:00 p.m., #6 William & Mary versus #2 Villanova met once again at Villanova Stadium for a national semifinal face-off. The game was broadcast live on ESPN2, and either winner of this match-up was going to make their first-ever national championship appearance in football. The Wildcats (12–1–0) came back from a 10–0 halftime deficit to defeat the Tribe for the second time in that season, 14–13. Villanova would then move on to defeat the Montana Grizzlies, 23–21, in the national championship.
