= Route 1 Rivalry =

American college football rivalry

- Delaware Fightin' Blue Hens Delaware State Hornets
- Sport: Football
- First meeting: November 23, 2007; Delaware 44, Delaware State 7
- Latest meeting: August 28, 2025; Delaware 35, Delaware State 17
- Trophy: First State Cup

Statistics
- Total meetings: 12
- All-time series: Delaware leads 12–0
- Largest victory: Delaware 45, Delaware State 0 (2011)
- Longest win streak: Delaware 12, (2007–present)
- Current win streak: Delaware 12, (2007–present)

Locations of Delaware and Delaware State

The Route 1 Rivalry is the name given for the American football rivalry between the University of Delaware and Delaware State University. The winner of the game is awarded the First State Cup. Delaware has won each of the 12 games of the rivalry, winning by at least ten points each time.

== History ==
For years, one of the most controversial aspects of the University of Delaware and Delaware State University football programs was that they had never been scheduled as potential instate rivals for a regular season game. It is highly unusual for two state universities that play on the same athletic tier to not play one another, particularly given their proximity. Critics charged that this had to do with the fact that DSU is a historically black college. Furthermore, supporters of a game between DSU and UD claimed that it would be akin to other instate rivalries and would be good for the state. In 2007, Jeff Pearlman, a University of Delaware graduate and ESPN writer, wrote a scathing article charging the Blue Hens with racism. In response to the charges of racism on UD's part, their supporters pointed out that Delaware has scheduled and played regular season games against several other HBCUs such as Morgan State and North Carolina A&T. UD supporters also claimed that DSU's team was not as strong as the Blue Hens, and that UD's program had made commitments to other universities that they had to fulfill. Finally, UD supporters also noted the fact that the two colleges routinely meet in other sports than football.

As it would turn out, Delaware and Delaware State finally met on the football field for the first time on November 23, 2007, in Newark, DE in the first round of the NCAA Division I National Championship Tournament. The Blue Hens defeated the Hornets 44–7 in front of 19,765 people, the largest playoff crowd in Delaware Stadium history. The game had by then garnered such attention in the media throughout the United States that it was the only first-round game televised live nationally on ESPN.

On February 25, 2009, University of Delaware Coach K. C. Keeler joined Delaware State University Coach Al Lavan along with school officials and state politicians in Dover, Delaware to announce that their schools had signed on to play the first regular season game in their history on September 19, 2009, at the University of Delaware, along with a three-game series in September 2012, 2013, and 2014. This is due to the fact that UD's Delaware Stadium seating of 22,000 is much larger than that of Delaware State's Alumni Stadium at just over 7,000. The schools had been engaged in talks to play a game as early as 2010, but Furman University, who had previously signed a contract to play a home and away series with UD, backed out of game two which was scheduled to be played at UD in order to play University of Missouri and garner a larger payday. This left the University of Delaware with an open date to fill with only a few months before the season started and the two sides quickly completed the deal.

== Trophy ==
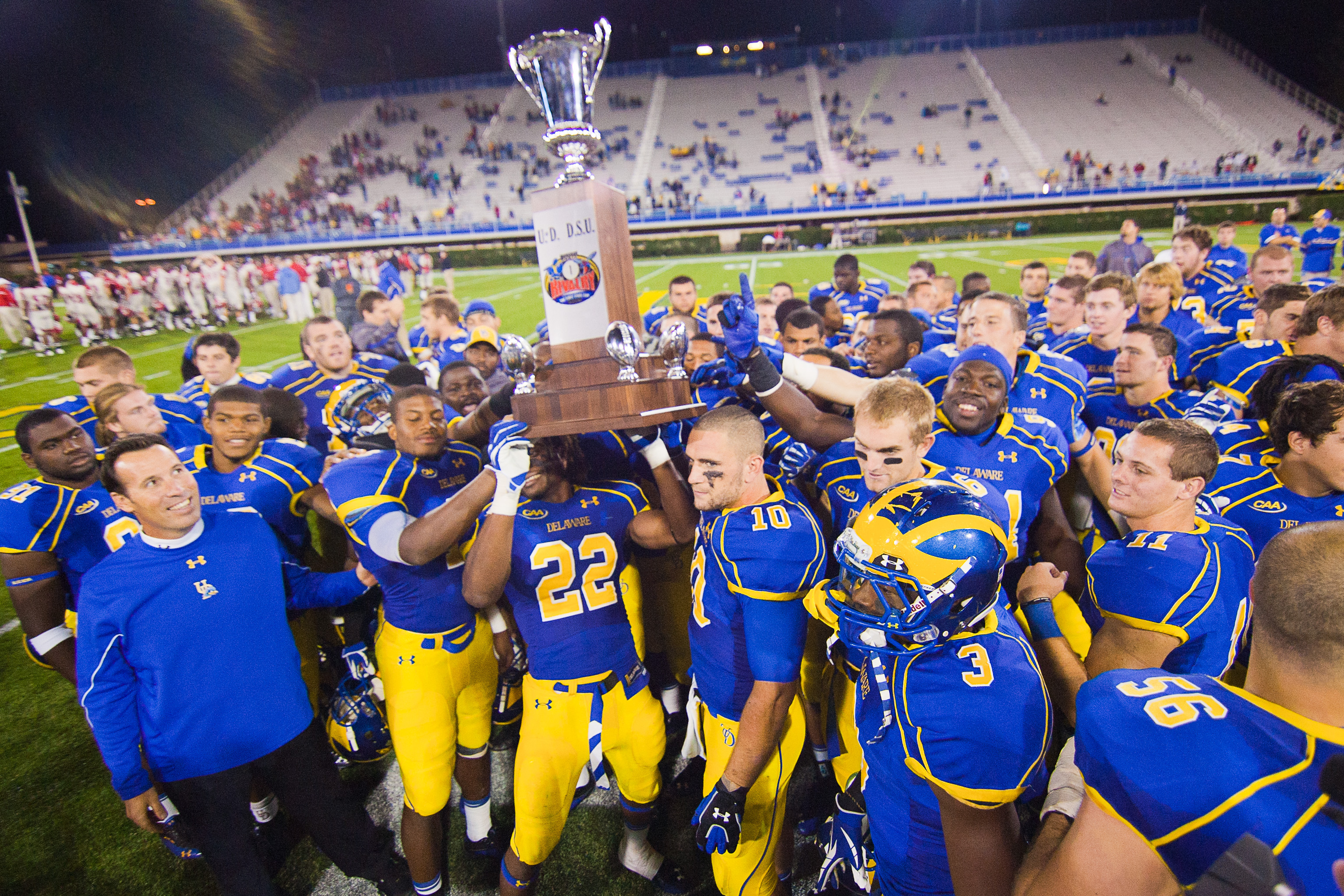
Delaware players Paul Worrilow (10), Leon Jackson (22) and Mark Schenaur (6) hold up the trophy after defeating Delaware State 45–0 on September 17, 2011

The News Journal, Delaware's main newspaper, held a contest to come up with a trophy for a winner of the rivalry game. Matthew Peart, of Newark, Delaware, suggested the "Route 1 Rivalry", after Delaware Route 1, a major roadway that runs from north to south through the state.

== Game results ==
Delaware has won each of the 12 games, with an average point differential of 24.8.

Delaware victories	Delaware State victories

No.	Date	Location	Winner	Score
1	November 23, 2007	Newark, DE	Delaware	44–7
2	September 19, 2009	Newark, DE	Delaware	27–17
3	September 17, 2011	Newark, DE	Delaware	45–0
4	September 8, 2012	Newark, DE	Delaware	38–14
5	September 7, 2013	Newark, DE	Delaware	42–21
6	September 7, 2014	Newark, DE	Delaware	27–9
7	September 1, 2016	Newark, DE	Delaware	56–14
8	August 31, 2017	Newark, DE	Delaware	22–3
9	August 29, 2019	Newark, DE	Delaware	31–13
10	April 10, 2021	Dover, DE	Delaware	34–14
11	September 10, 2022	Newark, DE	Delaware	35–9
12	August 28, 2025	Newark, DE	Delaware	35–17
Series: Delaware leads 12–0

== The second game ==
	1	2	3	4	Total
Delaware State	3	0	0	14	17
Delaware	7	0	7	13	27

In the first regular season meeting between the two schools in the new Route 1 Rivalry, more than 20,000 fans were in attendance for the noon kickoff of the intrastate game. The first quarter saw UD score a touchdown on their opening drive, a 1-yard rush by quarterback Pat Devlin at the 7:41 mark of the first quarter. The drive had initially stalled and kicker John Striefsky had missed a 42-yard field goal attempt wide left, however, the Delaware State Hornets were called for a personal foul on the play, giving UD 15 yards and a first down. The Hornets answered by driving down the field themselves, but had to settle for a 42-yard field goal by kicker Riley Flickinger, a career long. After trading punts several times and a 44-yard field goal attempt by Delaware State missed wide right, the Blue Hens were able to move the ball to the 1 yard line with 1.5 seconds left in the first half. The Blue Hens decided to go for the touchdown and the Hornets made a goal line stop as time expired in the first half with the aid of a questionable call by the officials. In the second half the offenses again moved the ball up and down the field but were still unable to punch it in for a score, with Delaware State reaching the Blue Hens 18 yard line before an interception. Late in the third Delaware took over the ball at their own 30 yard line after stopping the Hornets on downs and executed a 4 play 70-yard drive for a touchdown that again ended with a Pat Devlin 1-yard run to extend the lead to 14–3.

Delaware hosted Delaware State on September 19, 2009, for the two teams' first regular season meeting.

Delaware State again moved into Blue Hens territory for the third straight time, but again turned the ball over as a fumble by Jason Randall on the Delaware 25 yard line was recovered by UD and returned to the 41. The Hens then drove down the field on five plays ending with a Pat Devlin 17-yard touchdown pass to freshman Rob Jones, increasing the lead to 21–3. Delaware State attempted to answer back, driving down the field into scoring range only to turn the ball over again after a Flickinger's 35-yard field goal attempt was blocked. Delaware State finally got a break, however, as on the ensuing drive Pat Devlin's pass went off the hands of a receiver and was intercepted by free safety Jerome Strums who raced 71 yards down the field for the Hornets first touchdown, cutting into the lead 21–10. After an excellent kickoff return, UD needed just 3 plays to pick up 23 yards for another touchdown as Leon Jackson rushed for a 3-yard touchdown making it 27–10 with 3:36 left in the game. Delaware State was able to muster one final drive as Delaware State quarterback Anthony Glaud kept the ball himself for a 1-yard rushing touchdown with 31 seconds left in the game to complete the scoring at 27–17.

== See also ==
- List of NCAA college football rivalry games
