= 2009 Villanova Wildcats football team =

American college football season

2009 Villanova Wildcats football

NCAA Division I champion CAA co-champion Lambert Cup winner ECAC Team of the Year

NCAA Division I Championship Game, W 23–21 vs. Montana
- Conference: Colonial Athletic Association
- South Division

Ranking
- Sports Network: No. 1
- FCS Coaches: No. 1
- Record: 14–1 (7–1 CAA)
- Head coach: Andy Talley (25th season)
- Offensive coordinator: Sam Venuto (11th season)
- Offensive scheme: Multiple spread
- Defensive coordinator: Mark Reardon (5th season)
- Base defense: 4–2–5
- Home stadium: Villanova Stadium

2009 Colonial Athletic Association football standings
	Conf.			Overall
Team	W		L	W		L
North Division
No. 7 New Hampshire x^	6	–	2	10	–	3
Maine	4	–	4	5	–	6
Hofstra	3	–	5	5	–	6
UMass	3	–	5	5	–	6
Northeastern	3	–	5	3	–	8
Rhode Island	0	–	8	1	–	10
South Division
No. 1 Villanova x+^	7	–	1	14	–	1
No. 5 Richmond x+^	7	–	1	11	–	2
No. 4 William & Mary ^	6	–	2	11	–	3
Delaware	4	–	4	6	–	5
James Madison	4	–	4	6	–	5
Towson	1	–	7	2	–	9
+ – Conference co-champions; x – Division champion/co-champions; ^ – FCS playoff participant; Rankings from The Sports Network poll

The 2009 Villanova Wildcats football team represented Villanova University in the 2009 NCAA Division I FCS football season. They played their home games at Villanova Stadium in Villanova, Pennsylvania. They were co-champions of the Colonial Athletic Association (CAA) and advanced to the National Championship game where they defeated Montana, 23–21. It was Villanova's first national championship in football, marking them as the only team to have both an NCAA Division I Football and Men's Basketball championship (the FCS is the only official NCAA Division I Football Championship). They finished with a record of 14–1, 7–1 in CAA play.

== Schedule ==
Date	Time	Opponent	Rank	Site	TV	Result	Attendance
September 3	7:00 pm	at Temple*	No. 5	Lincoln Financial Field; Philadelphia, PA (Mayor's Cup)		W 27–24	27,759
September 12	7:00 pm	Lehigh*	No. 3	Villanova Stadium; Villanova, PA	FCS	W 38–17	8,811
September 19	7:00 pm	at Penn*	No. 2	Franklin Field; Philadelphia, PA	TCN	W 14–3	14,876
September 26	3:30 pm	Northeastern	No. 2	Villanova Stadium; Villanova, PA	TCN	W 56–7	11,119
October 3	3:30 pm	No. 5 William & Mary	No. 2	Villanova Stadium; Villanova, PA	Versus	W 28–17	8,217
October 10	12:00 pm	at No. 5 New Hampshire	No. 2	Cowell Stadium; Durham, NH		L 24–28	14,811
October 17	3:30 pm	at No. 16 James Madison	No. 6	Bridgeforth Stadium; Harrisonburg, VA	TCN	W 27–0	16,037
October 24	3:30 pm	Rhode Island^{†}	No. 4	Villanova Stadium; Villanova, PA		W 36–7	5,517
November 7	3:30 pm	at No. 1 Richmond	No. 4	UR Stadium; Richmond, Virginia	CSN	W 21–20	11,667
November 14	1:00 pm	at Towson	No. 2	Johnny Unitas Stadium; Towson, Maryland		W 49–7	5,339
November 21	3:30 pm	No. 25 Delaware	No. 2	Villanova Stadium; Villanova, PA (Battle of the Blue)	TCN	W 30–12	12,073
November 28	12:00 pm	No. 17 Holy Cross*	No. 2	Villanova Stadium; Villanova, PA (NCAA Division I First Round)		W 38–28	4,319
December 5	3:30 pm	No. 10 New Hampshire*	No. 2	Villanova Stadium; Villanova, PA (NCAA Division I Quarterfinal)	CSN	W 46–7	2,661
December 11	8:00 pm	No. 6 William & Mary*	No. 2	Villanova Stadium; Villanova, PA (NCAA Division I Semifinal)	ESPN2	W 14–13	4,171
December 18	8:00 pm	vs. No. 1 Montana*	No. 2	Finley Stadium; TN (NCAA Division I Championship Game)	ESPN2	W 23–21	14,328
*Non-conference game; ^{†}Homecoming; Rankings from The Sports Network Poll released prior to the game; All times are in Eastern time

== Game summaries ==
=== At Temple ===
	1	2	3	4	Total
No. 5 Wildcats	0	0	14	13	27
Owls	0	10	7	7	24

=== Lehigh ===
	1	2	3	4	Total
Mountain Hawks	0	7	3	7	17
No. 3 Wildcats	10	14	7	7	38

=== At Penn ===
	1	2	3	4	Total
No. 2 Wildcats	7	0	7	0	14
Quakers	0	3	0	0	3

=== Northeastern ===
	1	2	3	4	Total
Huskies	0	0	7	0	7
No. 2 Wildcats	21	7	14	14	56

=== No. 5 William & Mary ===
	1	2	3	4	Total
No. 5 Tribe	0	6	3	8	17
No. 2 Wildcats	7	14	7	0	28

=== At No. 5 New Hampshire ===
	1	2	3	4	Total
No. 2 Villanova	7	10	7	0	24
No. 5 New Hampshire	16	6	0	6	28

=== At No. 16 James Madison ===
	1	2	3	4	Total
No. 6 Wildcats	7	13	7	0	27
No. 16 Dukes	0	0	0	0	0

=== Rhode Island ===
	1	2	3	4	Total
Rams	0	0	7	0	7
No. 4 Wildcats	7	14	7	8	36

=== At No. 1 Richmond ===
	1	2	3	4	Total
No. 4 Wildcats	7	7	0	7	21
No. 1 Spiders	0	6	0	14	20

=== At Towson ===
	1	2	3	4	Total
No. 2 Wildcats	21	14	14	0	49
Tigers	0	0	7	0	7

=== No. 25 Delaware ===
	1	2	3	4	Total
No. 25 Fightin' Blue Hens	0	3	3	6	12
No. 2 Wildcats	10	10	7	3	30

=== No. 17 Holy Cross (NCAA Division I First Round) ===
	1	2	3	4	Total
No. 17 Crusaders	14	0	7	7	28
No. 2 Wildcats	14	14	7	3	38

=== No. 10 New Hampshire (NCAA Division I Quarterfinal) ===
	1	2	3	4	Total
No. 10 New Hampshire	0	0	0	7	7
No. 2 Villanova	17	7	15	7	46

=== No. 6 William & Mary (NCAA Division I Semifinal) ===
	1	2	3	4	Total
No. 6 Tribe	0	10	3	0	13
No. 2 Wildcats	0	0	7	7	14

=== Vs. No. 1 Montana (NCAA Division I Championship Game) ===
	1	2	3	4	Total
No. 1 Grizzlies	7	7	0	7	21
No. 2 Wildcats	3	6	7	7	23

== Roster ==
2009 Villanova Wildcats football team roster
Players			Coaches
Offense: Pos. / # / Name / Class; OL / 71 / Ben Ijalana / Sr	Defense: Pos. / # / Name / Class	Special teams: Pos. / # / Name / Class	Head coach: Andy Talley; Coordinators/assistant coaches: Mark Ferrante (AHC/OL); Darrius G. Smith (RB/TE); Legend: (C) Team captain; (S) Suspended; (I) Ineligible; Injured; Redshirt; Roster
