= 2009 NCAA Division I FCS football season =

American college football season

2009 NCAA Division I FCS season

Regular season
- Number of teams: 125
- Duration: August – November
- Payton Award: Armanti Edwards
- Buchanan Award: Arthur Moats

Playoff
- Duration: November 28 – December 18
- Championship date: December 18, 2009
- Championship site: Finley Stadium; Chattanooga, Tennessee
- Champion: Villanova

NCAA Division I FCS football seasons
- «2008 2010»

The 2009 NCAA Division I FCS football season, the 2009 season of college football for teams in the Football Championship Subdivision (FCS), began in August 2009 and concluded with the 2009 NCAA Division I Football Championship Game on December 18, 2009, in Chattanooga, Tennessee, won by Villanova 23–21 over Montana.

== Conference changes and new programs ==
School	2008 Conference	2009 Conference
Bryant	FCS Independent	NEC
Iona	FCS Independent	Dropped Program
Marist	FCS Independent	Pioneer
Old Dominion	New Program	FCS Independent

== FCS team wins over FBS teams ==
September 3 – Villanova 27, Temple 24
September 5 – Richmond 24, Duke 16
September 5 – William & Mary 26, Virginia 14
September 12 – New Hampshire 23, Ball State 16
September 19 – Central Arkansas 28, Western Kentucky 7

== Notable upsets ==
- August 27 – Quincy 26, Indiana State 20 ^{OT} (Division II over Division I FCS)
- September 5 – Arkansas-Monticello 27, Arkansas-Pine Bluff 3 (Division II over Division I FCS)
- September 5 – Shaw 20, Bethune-Cookman 6 (Division II over Division I FCS)
- September 5 – Saint Joseph's (IN) 31, Valparaiso 6 (Division II over Division I FCS non-scholarship)
- September 5 – Stonehill 45, Wagner 42 (Division II over Division I FCS)
- September 12 – Birmingham–Southern 35, Campbell 28 ^{OT} (Division III over Division I FCS non-scholarship)
- September 12 – Lenoir-Rhyne 42, Davidson 0 (Division II over Division I FCS non-scholarship)
- September 12 – Urbana 13, Dayton 10 (Division II over Division I FCS non-scholarship)
- September 26 – Carthage 34, Valparaiso 24 (Division III over Division I FCS non-scholarship)
- September 26 – Concordia (AL) 23, Savannah State 21 (USCAA over Division I FCS)
- September 26 – Central Washington 33, Idaho State 22 (Division II over Division I FCS)
- October 17 – Sioux Falls 28, North Dakota 13 (NAIA over Division I FCS)
- November 14 – Webber International 35, Savannah State 20 (NAIA over Division I FCS)
- November 26 – Tuskegee 21, Alabama State 0 (Division II over Division I FCS)

== Eastern Illinois coach's death ==
On Saturday, November 28, just hours after Eastern Illinois lost to Southern Illinois 48–7 in the first round of the FCS playoffs, Eastern Illinois' offensive coordinator Jeffrey O. Hoover, age 41, was killed in a car accident. The single-vehicle accident occurred south of Effingham when Hoover, his family and EIU strength coach Eric Cash struck a deer while driving home from Carbondale, the home of SIU.

Hoover's death was the second Eastern Illinois coaching death within a month. On November 4, women's basketball assistant coach Jackie Moore, 28, died after collapsing during a workout on campus.

== Conference standings ==
2009 Big Sky Conference football standings
	Conf.			Overall
Team	W		L	W		L
No. 2 Montana $^	8	–	0	14	–	1
No. 13 Eastern Washington ^	6	–	2	8	–	4
No. 17 Weber State ^	6	–	2	7	–	5
Montana State	5	–	3	7	–	4
Northern Arizona	4	–	4	5	–	6
Sacramento State	4	–	4	5	–	6
Northern Colorado	1	–	7	3	–	8
Portland State	1	–	7	2	–	9
Idaho State	1	–	7	1	–	10
$ – Conference champion; ^ – FCS playoff participant; Rankings from The Sports Network poll

2009 Big South Conference football standings
	Conf.			Overall
Team	W		L	W		L
No. 22 Liberty +	5	–	1	8	–	3
Stony Brook +	5	–	1	6	–	5
Charleston Southern	4	–	2	6	–	5
Gardner–Webb	3	–	3	6	–	5
Coastal Carolina	3	–	3	5	–	6
VMI	1	–	5	2	–	9
Presbyterian	0	–	6	0	–	11
+ – Conference co-champions; Rankings from The Sports Network poll

2009 Colonial Athletic Association football standings
	Conf.			Overall
Team	W		L	W		L
North Division
No. 7 New Hampshire x^	6	–	2	10	–	3
Maine	4	–	4	5	–	6
Hofstra	3	–	5	5	–	6
UMass	3	–	5	5	–	6
Northeastern	3	–	5	3	–	8
Rhode Island	0	–	8	1	–	10
South Division
No. 1 Villanova x+^	7	–	1	14	–	1
No. 5 Richmond x+^	7	–	1	11	–	2
No. 4 William & Mary ^	6	–	2	11	–	3
Delaware	4	–	4	6	–	5
James Madison	4	–	4	6	–	5
Towson	1	–	7	2	–	9
+ – Conference co-champions; x – Division champion/co-champions; ^ – FCS playoff participant; Rankings from The Sports Network poll

2009 Great West Conference football standings
	Conf.			Overall
Team	W		L	W		L
UC Davis $	3	–	1	6	–	5
North Dakota	2	–	2	6	–	5
South Dakota	2	–	2	5	–	5
Southern Utah	2	–	2	5	–	6
Cal Poly	1	–	3	4	–	7
$ – Conference champion

2009 Ivy League football standings
	Conf.			Overall
Team	W		L	W		L
No. 20 Penn $	7	–	0	8	–	2
Harvard	6	–	1	7	–	3
Brown	4	–	3	6	–	4
Columbia	3	–	4	4	–	6
Princeton	3	–	4	4	–	6
Yale	2	–	5	4	–	6
Dartmouth	2	–	5	2	–	8
Cornell	1	–	6	2	–	8
$ – Conference champion; Rankings from The Sports Network poll

2009 Mid-Eastern Athletic Conference football standings
	Conf.			Overall
Team	W		L	W		L
No. 8 South Carolina State $^	7	–	1	10	–	2
No. 23 Florida A&M	6	–	2	8	–	3
Norfolk State	5	–	3	7	–	4
Morgan State	4	–	4	6	–	5
Bethune–Cookman	4	–	4	5	–	6
Delaware State	3	–	4	4	–	6
Hampton	3	–	5	5	–	6
North Carolina A&T	2	–	5	4	–	6
Howard	0	–	8	2	–	9
$ – Conference champion; ^ – FCS playoff participant; Rankings from The Sports Network poll

2009 Missouri Valley Football Conference standings
	Conf.			Overall
Team	W		L	W		L
No. 6 Southern Illinois $^	8	–	0	11	–	2
No. 11 South Dakota State ^	7	–	1	8	–	3
No. 18 Northern Iowa	5	–	3	7	–	4
Illinois State	5	–	3	6	–	5
Missouri State	4	–	4	6	–	5
Youngstown State	4	–	4	6	–	5
North Dakota State	2	–	6	3	–	8
Indiana State	1	–	7	1	–	10
Western Illinois	0	–	8	1	–	10
$ – Conference champion; ^ – FCS playoff participant; Rankings from The Sports Network poll

2009 Northeast Conference football standings
	Conf.			Overall
Team	W		L	W		L
Central Connecticut State $	7	–	1	9	–	3
Albany	6	–	2	7	–	4
Wagner	5	–	3	6	–	5
Robert Morris	5	–	3	5	–	6
Monmouth	4	–	4	5	–	6
Bryant	4	–	4	5	–	6
Duquesne	2	–	6	3	–	8
Sacred Heart	2	–	6	2	–	8
Saint Francis (PA)	1	–	7	2	–	9
$ – Conference champion

2009 Ohio Valley Conference football standings
	Conf.			Overall
Team	W		L	W		L
No. 16 Jacksonville State	6	–	1	8	–	3
No. 19 Eastern Illinois $^	6	–	2	8	–	4
Tennessee Tech	5	–	3	6	–	5
Eastern Kentucky	5	–	3	5	–	6
UT Martin	4	–	4	5	–	6
Tennessee State	3	–	4	4	–	7
Austin Peay	3	–	5	4	–	7
Murray State	2	–	6	3	–	8
Southeast Missouri State	1	–	7	2	–	9
$ – Conference champion; ^ – FCS playoff participant; Jacksonville State had the best record in conference play, but was not eligible for the FCS playoffs because of APR violations.; Rankings from The Sports Network poll

2009 Patriot League football standings
	Conf.			Overall
Team	W		L	W		L
No. 14 Holy Cross $^	5	–	1	9	–	3
No. 21 Colgate	4	–	2	9	–	2
No. 24 Lafayette	4	–	2	8	–	3
Lehigh	4	–	2	4	–	7
Fordham	2	–	4	5	–	6
Bucknell	2	–	4	4	–	7
Georgetown	0	–	6	0	–	11
$ – Conference champion; ^ – FCS playoff participant; Rankings from The Sports Network poll

2009 Pioneer Football League standings
	Conf.			Overall
Team	W		L	W		L
Butler +	7	–	1	11	–	1
Dayton +	7	–	1	9	–	2
Drake	6	–	2	8	–	3
Jacksonville	6	–	2	7	–	4
Marist	5	–	3	7	–	4
San Diego	3	–	5	4	–	7
Davidson	3	–	5	3	–	7
Campbell	2	–	6	3	–	8
Morehead State	1	–	7	3	–	8
Valparaiso	0	–	8	1	–	10
+ – Conference co-champions

2009 Southern Conference football standings
	Conf.			Overall
Team	W		L	W		L
No. 3 Appalachian State $^	8	–	0	11	–	3
No. 9 Elon ^	7	–	1	9	–	3
Furman	5	–	3	6	–	5
Chattanooga	4	–	4	6	–	5
Georgia Southern	4	–	4	5	–	6
Samford	3	–	5	5	–	6
Wofford	2	–	6	3	–	8
The Citadel	2	–	6	4	–	7
Western Carolina	1	–	7	2	–	9
$ – Conference champion; ^ – FCS playoff participant; Rankings from The Sports Network poll

2009 Southland Conference football standings
	Conf.			Overall
Team	W		L	W		L
No. 10 Stephen F. Austin +^	6	–	1	10	–	3
No. 12 McNeese State +^	6	–	1	9	–	2
No. 25 Texas State	5	–	2	7	–	4
Southeastern Louisiana	4	–	3	6	–	5
Sam Houston State	3	–	4	5	–	6
Central Arkansas	2	–	5	5	–	6
Nicholls State	2	–	5	3	–	9
Northwestern State	0	–	7	0	–	11
+ – Conference co-champions; ^ – FCS playoff participant; Rankings from The Sports Network poll

2009 Southwestern Athletic Conference football standings
	Conf.			Overall
Team	W		L	W		L
East Division
Alabama A&M xy	4	–	3	7	–	5
Alcorn State	3	–	4	3	–	6
Jackson State	3	–	4	3	–	7
Alabama State	1	–	6	4	–	7
Mississippi Valley State	1	–	6	3	–	8
West Division
No. 15 Prairie View A&M xy$	7	–	0	9	–	1
Grambling State	5	–	2	7	–	4
Texas Southern	5	–	2	6	–	5
Southern	3	–	4	6	–	6
Arkansas–Pine Bluff	3	–	4	5	–	5
Championship: Prairie View A&M 30, Alabama A&M 24
$ – Conference champion; x – Division champion/co-champions; y – Championship game participant; Rankings from The Sports Network Poll

2009 NCAA Division I FCS independents football standings
	Conf.			Overall
Team	W		L	W		L
Old Dominion		–		9	–	2
North Carolina Central		–		4	–	7
Savannah State		–		2	–	8
Winston–Salem State		–		1	–	10

== Conference champions ==
=== Automatic berths ===
- Big Sky Conference – Montana
- Colonial Athletic Association – Villanova
- Missouri Valley Football Conference – Southern Illinois
- Mid-Eastern Athletic Conference – South Carolina State
- Ohio Valley Conference – Eastern Illinois (Jacksonville State had the best record in conference play, but was not eligible for the FCS playoffs because of APR violations.)
- Patriot League – Holy Cross
- Southern Conference – Appalachian State
- Southland Conference – Stephen F. Austin

=== Invitation ===
- Great West Conference – UC Davis
- Big South Conference – Liberty and Stony Brook, co-champions
- Northeast Conference – Central Connecticut State
- Pioneer Football League – Butler and Dayton, co-champions; Butler received the conference's berth in the Gridiron Classic.

In order to be eligible for the playoffs, these teams must have a minimum of eight Division I wins, with at least two against teams in automatic bid conferences. They also must be ranked an average of 16 or better in the national rankings, made up of the following components:

- The Sports Network media poll
- The FCS Coaches poll
- A variation of the Gridiron Power Index, using only five of the computer rankings used in that system

No team in the invitational conferences qualified. Starting in 2010, the Big South and NEC will become automatic bid conferences with the expansion of the playoff field to 20 teams.

=== Abstains ===
- Ivy League – Penn (8–2, 7–0)
- Southwestern Athletic Conference – Prairie View A&M (9–1, 7–0)

(Overall Record, Conference Record)

== Postseason ==
=== NCAA Division I playoff bracket ===
First Round
November 28
Campus sites

Quarterfinals
December 5
Campus sites

Semifinals
December 11 and December 12
Campus sites

National Championship Game

December 18
Finley Stadium
Chattanooga, Tennessee

South Dakota State (8–3)
48

1
Montana* (11–0)
61

1
Montana*
51

Stephen F. Austin
0

Eastern Washington (8–3)
33

Stephen F. Austin* (9–2)
44

1
Montana*
24

Appalachian State
17

Elon (9–2)
13

4
Richmond* (10–1)
16

4
Richmond*
31

Appalachian State
35

South Carolina State (10–1)
13

Appalachian State* (9–2)
20

1
Montana
21

2
Villanova
23

Holy Cross (9–2)
28

2
Villanova* (10–1)
38

2
Villanova*
46

New Hampshire
7

New Hampshire (9–2)
49

McNeese State* (9–2)
13

2
Villanova*
14

William & Mary
13

Eastern Illinois (8–3)
7

3
Southern Illinois* (10–1)
48

3
Southern Illinois*
3

William & Mary
24

Weber State (7–4)
0

William & Mary* (9–2)
38

* Host institution

=== SWAC Championship Game ===
Date	Location	Venue	West Div. Champion	East Div. Champion	Result
December 12	Birmingham, Alabama	Legion Field	Prairie View A&M	Alabama A&M	Prairie View A&M 30–24

=== Gridiron Classic ===
The Gridiron Classic is an annual game between the champions of the Northeast Conference and the Pioneer Football League that has been held since December 2006.

Date	Location	Venue	NEC Champion	PFL Champion	Result
December 5	Indianapolis	Butler Bowl	Central Connecticut State	Butler	Butler 28–23

== Final poll standings ==
Standings are from The Sports Network final poll.

Rank	Team	Record
1	Villanova Wildcats	14–1
2	Montana Grizzlies	14–1
3	Appalachian State Mountaineers	11–3
4	William & Mary Tribe	11–3
5	Richmond Spiders	11–2
6	Southern Illinois Salukis	11–2
7	New Hampshire Wildcats	10–3
8	South Carolina State Bulldogs	10–2
9	Elon Phoenix	9–3
10	Stephen F. Austin Lumberjacks	10–3
11	South Dakota State Jackrabbits	8–4
12	McNeese State Cowboys	9–3
13	Eastern Washington Eagles	8–4
14	Holy Cross Crusaders	9–3
15	Prairie View A&M Panthers	9–1
16	Jacksonville State Gamecocks	8–3
17	Weber State Wildcats	7–5
18	Northern Iowa Panthers	7–4
19	Eastern Illinois Panthers	8–4
20	Penn Quakers	8–2
21	Colgate Raiders	9–2
22	Liberty Flames	8–3
23	Florida A&M Rattlers	8–3
24	Lafayette Leopards	8–3
25	Texas State Bobcats	7–4

Standings are from the FCS Coaches final poll.

Rank	Team	Record
1	Villanova Wildcats	14–1
2	Montana Grizzlies	14–1
T-3	Appalachian State Mountaineers	11–3
T-3	William & Mary Tribe	11–3
5	Richmond Spiders	11–2
6	Southern Illinois Salukis	11–2
7	New Hampshire Wildcats	10–3
8	South Carolina State Bulldogs	10–2
9	Stephen F. Austin Lumberjacks	10–3
10	Elon Phoenix	9–3
11	South Dakota State Jackrabbits	8–4
12	McNeese State Cowboys	9–3
13	Eastern Washington Eagles	8–4
14	Holy Cross Crusaders	9–3
15	Eastern Illinois Panthers	8–4
16	Jacksonville State Gamecocks	8–3
17	Weber State Wildcats	7–5
18	Northern Iowa Panthers	7–4
19	Prairie View A&M Panthers	9–1
20	Colgate Raiders	9–2
21	Liberty Flames	8–3
22	Florida A&M Rattlers	8–3
23	Penn Quakers	8–2
24	Texas State Bobcats	7–4
25	Lafayette Leopards	8–3
