= 2009 NCAA Division I FCS football rankings =

The 2009 NCAA Division I FCS football rankings are from the Sports Network media poll and the coaches poll. This is for the 2009 season.

== Legend ==
	Increase in ranking
	Decrease in ranking
	Not ranked previous week
(#–#)	Win–loss record
(Italics)	Number of first place votes
т	Tied with team above or below also with this symbol

== The Sports Network poll ==
	Preseason	Week 1 Sept 8	Week 2 Sept 15	Week 3 Sept 22	Week 4 Sept 29	Week 5 Oct 6	Week 6 Oct 13	Week 7 Oct 20	Week 8 Oct 27	Week 9 Nov 3	Week 10 Nov 10	Week 11 Nov 17	Week 12 Nov 24	Week 13 Postseason	
1.	Appalachian State (79)	Richmond (1–0) (103)	Richmond (2–0)	Richmond (3–0) (132)	Richmond (4–0) (117)	Richmond (4–0) (106)	Richmond (5–0) (119)	Richmond (6–0) (131)	Richmond (7–0) (128)	Richmond (8–0) (123)	Southern Illinois (8–1) (37)	Southern Illinois (9–1) (49)	Southern Illinois (10–1) (36)	Villanova (14–1) (101)	1.
2.	Richmond (72)	Appalachian State (0–1) (10)	Villanova (2–0)	Villanova (3–0) (9)	Villanova (4–0) (13)	Villanova (5–0) (26)	Northern Iowa (5–1) (11)	Montana (6–0) (5)	Montana (7–0) (7)	Montana (8–0) (9)	Montana (9–0) (64)	Villanova (9–1) (38)	Villanova (10–1) (28)	Montana (14–1)	2.
3.	Montana (2)	Villanova (1–0) (3)	Northern Iowa (1–1)	Northern Iowa (2–1) (6)	Northern Iowa (3–1) (6)	Northern Iowa (4–1) (5)	Montana (5–0)	Southern Illinois (5–1) (1)	Southern Illinois (6–1) (2)	Southern Illinois (7–1) (7)	Villanova (8–1) (32)	Montana (10–0) (45)	Montana (11–0) (29)	Appalachian State (11–3)	3.
4.	Northern Iowa (2)	Northern Iowa (0–1) (3)	Montana (2–0)	Montana (3–0)	Montana (4–0)	Montana (4–0) (1)	New Hampshire (5–0) (1)	Villanova (6–1)	Villanova (7–1) (1)	Villanova (7–1) (1)	Richmond (8–1)	Richmond (9–1)	Richmond (10–1)	William & Mary (11–3)	4.
5.	Villanova (2)	Montana (1–0)	William & Mary (2–0)	William & Mary (3–0) (2)	William & Mary (4–0) (2)	New Hampshire (4–0) (1)	Southern Illinois (4–1)	William & Mary (5–1)	William & Mary (6–1)	William & Mary (7–1)	William & Mary (8–1)	William & Mary (9–1)	Appalachian State (9–2) (1)	Richmond (11–2)	5.
6.	James Madison (1)	James Madison (0–0)	New Hampshire (2–0)	New Hampshire (2–0) (1)	New Hampshire (3–0) (1)	Southern Illinois (3–1)	Villanova (5–1)	Northern Iowa (5–2)	Elon (6–1)	Elon (7–1)	Elon (8–1)	Appalachian State (8–2) (3)	William & Mary (9–2)	Southern Illinois (11–2)	6.
7.	Southern Illinois	William & Mary (1–0) (3)	James Madison (0–1)	James Madison (1–1)	James Madison (2–1)	McNeese State (3–1)	William & Mary (5–1)	Elon (5–1)	Appalachian State (5–2)	Appalachian State (6–2) (1)	Appalachian State (7–2)	South Carolina State (9–1) (2)	South Carolina State (10–1)	New Hampshire (10–3)	7.
8.	New Hampshire	Southern Illinois (0–1)	McNeese State (2–0)	McNeese State (3–0)	Southern Illinois (2–1)	William & Mary (4–1)	Elon (5–1)	Appalachian State (4–2)	New Hampshire (6–1)	New Hampshire (7–1)	New Hampshire (8–1) (1)	McNeese State (8–2)	McNeese State (9–2)	South Carolina State (10–2)	8.
9.	Weber State (1)	New Hampshire (1–0)	Southern Illinois (0–1)	Southern Illinois (1–1)	McNeese State (3–1)	Appalachian State (2–2)	Appalachian State (3–2)	New Hampshire (5–1)	South Dakota State (6–1)	South Dakota State (7–1)	South Carolina State (8–1) (1)	Northern Iowa (7–3)	Elon (9–2)	Elon (9–3)	9.
10.	Wofford	Elon (1–0)	Appalachian State (0–2)	Appalachian State (0–2)	Appalachian State (1–2)	Elon (4–1)	Central Arkansas (4–1)	South Carolina State (5–1)	South Carolina State (6–1)	South Carolina State (7–1) (1)	McNeese State (7–2)	Elon (8–2)	New Hampshire (9–2)	Stephen F. Austin (10–3)	10.
11.	Elon	Weber State (0–1)	Elon (2–0)	Weber State (1–2)	Weber State (2–2)	Central Arkansas (3–1)	South Carolina State (4–1)	South Dakota State (5–1)	Stephen F. Austin (6–1)	Northern Iowa (5–3)	Northern Iowa (6–3)	New Hampshire (8–2)	South Dakota State (8–3)	South Dakota State (8–4)	11.
12.	Cal Poly	Cal Poly (0–0)	Cal Poly (1–0)	Central Arkansas (1–1)	Elon (3–1)	UMass (3–1)	Jacksonville State (4–2)	McNeese State (4–2)	Northern Iowa (5–3)	McNeese State (6–2)	South Dakota State (7–2)	South Dakota State (7–3)	Stephen F. Austin (9–2)	McNeese State (9–3)	12.
13.	Central Arkansas	Central Arkansas (0–1)	Weber State (0–2)	Elon (2–1)	Central Arkansas (2–1)	James Madison (2–2)	McNeese State (3–2)	Jacksonville State (4–2)	McNeese State (5–2)	Holy Cross (7–1)	Holy Cross (8–1)	Holy Cross (9–1)	Eastern Washington (8–3)	Eastern Washington (8–4)	13.
14.	William & Mary	Wofford (0–1)	Wofford (1–1)	South Carolina State (2–0)	UMass (3–1)	Eastern Washington (4–1)	South Dakota State (4–1)	UMass (4–2)	Weber State (5–3)	Eastern Illinois (7–2)	Eastern Illinois (7–2)	Eastern Illinois (8–2)	Jacksonville State (8–3)	Holy Cross (9–3)	14.
15.	McNeese State	South Carolina State (1–0) (1)	South Carolina State (2–0)	UMass (2–1)	South Carolina State (3–0)	Cal Poly (2–2)	Weber State (3–3)	Stephen F. Austin (5–1)	Central Arkansas (5–2)	Stephen F. Austin (6–2)	Stephen F. Austin (7–2)	Stephen F. Austin (8–2)	Weber State (7–4)	Prairie View A&M (9–1)	15.
16.	South Carolina State (1)	McNeese State (1–0)	Central Arkansas (0–1)	Cal Poly (1–1)	South Dakota State (3–0)	Eastern Kentucky (3–1)	James Madison (2–3)	Weber State (4–3)	Delaware (5–2)	Liberty (6–2)	Liberty (7–2)	Liberty (8–2)	Northern Iowa (7–4)	Jacksonville State (8–3)	16.
17.	UMass	UMass (0–1)	UMass (1–1)	South Dakota State (2–0)	Eastern Washington (3–1)	South Carolina State (3–1)	Colgate (6–0)	Colgate (7–0)	Holy Cross (6–1)	Jacksonville State (5–3)	Jacksonville State (6–3)	Jacksonville State (7–3)	Holy Cross (9–2)	Weber State (7–5)	17.
18.	Eastern Washington	Eastern Washington (1–0)	South Dakota State (1–0)	Wofford (1–2)	Eastern Kentucky (2–1)	Jacksonville State (3–2)	UMass (3–2)	Central Arkansas (4–2)	Cal Poly (4–3)	Colgate (8–1)	Eastern Washington (6–3)	Eastern Washington (7–3)	Prairie View A&M (8–1)	Northern Iowa (7–4)	18.
19.	Maine	Texas State (1–0)	Texas State (1–0)	Eastern Washington (2–1)	Cal Poly (1–2)	Holy Cross (4–0)	Cal Poly (2–3)	Delaware (5–2)	UMass (4–3)	Weber State (5–4)	Weber State (5–4)	Weber State (6–4)	Eastern Illinois (8–3)	Eastern Illinois (8–4)	19.
20.	Texas State	Maine (1–0)	Maine (2–0)	Eastern Kentucky (1–1)	Jacksonville State (2–2)	South Dakota State (3–1)	Stephen F. Austin (4–1)	Cal Poly (3–3)	Eastern Illinois (6–2)	Central Arkansas (5–3)	Lafayette (8–1)	Prairie View A&M (7–1)	Colgate (9–2)	Penn (8–2)	20.
21.	Jacksonville State	South Dakota State (0–0)	Eastern Washington (1–1)	Holy Cross (3–0)	Holy Cross (3–0)	Weber State (2–3)	Eastern Washington (4–2)	Eastern Kentucky (4–2)	Northern Arizona (5–2)	Eastern Washington (6–3)	Prairie View A&M (6–1)	Lafayette (8–2)	Penn (8–2)	Colgate (9–2)	21.
22.	South Dakota State	Eastern Kentucky (0–1)	Eastern Kentucky (0–1)	Jacksonville State (1–2)	Texas State (2–1)	Florida A&M (4–0)	Florida A&M (4–1)	Holy Cross (5–1)	Jacksonville State (4–3)	Prairie View A&M (5–1)	Florida A&M (7–2)	Colgate (9–2)	Liberty (8–3)	Liberty (8–3)	22.
23.	Harvard	Jacksonville State (0–1)	Holy Cross (2–0)	Texas State (1–1)	Eastern Illinois (4–0)	Colgate (5–0)	Delaware (4–2)	Liberty (4–2)	Liberty (5–2)	Delaware (5–3)	Delaware (6–3)	Montana State (7–3)	Florida A&M (8–3)	Florida A&M (8–3)	23.
24.	Eastern Kentucky	Harvard (0–0)	Jacksonville State (0–2)	Eastern Illinois (3–0)	Florida A&M (4–0)	Montana State (3–1)	Eastern Kentucky (3–2)	Northern Arizona (4–2)	Colgate (7–1)	Florida A&M (6–2)	Colgate (8–2)	Penn (7–2)	Lafayette (8–3)	Lafayette (8–3)	24.
25.	Grambling State т	Holy Cross (1–0)	Harvard (0–0)	Liberty (2–1)	Colgate (4–0)	Eastern Illinois (4–1)	Holy Cross (4–1)	Eastern Illinois (5–2)	Prairie View A&M (5–1)	Lafayette (7–1)	Texas State (6–3)	Delaware (6–4)	Texas State (7–4)	Texas State (7–4)	25.
26.	Holy Cross т														26.
	Preseason	Week 1 Sept 8	Week 2 Sept 15	Week 3 Sept 22	Week 4 Sept 29	Week 5 Oct 6	Week 6 Oct 13	Week 7 Oct 20	Week 8 Oct 27	Week 9 Nov 3	Week 10 Nov 10	Week 11 Nov 17	Week 12 Nov 24	Week 13 Postseason	
		Dropped: 25 Grambling State	None	Dropped: 20 Maine; 25 Harvard	Dropped: 18 Wofford; 25 Liberty	Dropped: 22 Texas State	Dropped: 24 Montana State; 25 Eastern Illinois	Dropped: 16 James Madison; 21 Eastern Washington; 22 Florida A&M	Dropped: 21 Eastern Kentucky	Dropped: 18 Cal Poly; 19 UMass; 21 Northern Arizona	Dropped: 20 Central Arkansas	Dropped: 22 Florida A&M; 25 Texas State	Dropped: 23 Montana State; 25 Delaware	None	

== The Coaches poll ==
	Preseason	Week 1 Sept 8	Week 2 Sept 15	Week 3 Sept 22	Week 4 Sept 29	Week 5 Oct 6	Week 6 Oct 13	Week 7 Oct 20	Week 8 Oct 27	Week 9 Nov 3	Week 10 Nov 10	Week 11 Nov 17	Week 12 Nov 24	Week 13 Postseason	
1.	Appalachian State (13)	Richmond (1–0) (24)	Richmond (2–0) (25)	Richmond (3–0) (25)	Richmond (4–0) (28)	Richmond (4–0) (27)	Richmond (5–0) (28)	Richmond (6–0) (28)	Richmond (7–0) (28)	Richmond (8–0)	Montana (9–0) (16)	Montana (10–0) (17)	Montana (11–0)	Villanova (14–1)	1.
2.	Richmond (10)	Appalachian State (0–1) (3)	Villanova (2–0)	Villanova (3–0)	Villanova (4–0)	Villanova (5–0) (1)	Montana (5–0)	Montana (6–0)	Montana (7–0)	Montana (8–0)	Southern Illinois (8–1) (6)	Southern Illinois (9–1) (7)	Southern Illinois (10–1)	Montana (14–1)	2.
3.	Montana	Villanova (1–0)	Montana (2–0)	Montana (3–0)	Montana (4–0)	Montana (4–0)	Northern Iowa (5–1)	Southern Illinois (5–1)	Southern Illinois (6–1)	Southern Illinois (7–1)	Villanova (8–1) (6)	Villanova (9–1) (4)	Villanova (10–1)	Appalachian State (11–3) т	3.
4.	Northern Iowa (1)	Montana (1–0)	Northern Iowa (1–1)	Northern Iowa (2–1)	Northern Iowa (3–1)	Northern Iowa (4–1)	New Hampshire (5–0)	Villanova (6–1)	Villanova (7–1)	Villanova (7–1)	Richmond (8–1) т	Richmond (9–1)	Richmond (10–1)	William & Mary (11–3) т	4.
5.	Villanova (1)	Northern Iowa (0–1)	William & Mary (2–0)	William & Mary (3–0)	William & Mary (4–0)	New Hampshire (4–0)	Southern Illinois (4–1)	William & Mary (5–1)	William & Mary (6–1)	William & Mary (7–1)	William & Mary (8–1) т	William & Mary (9–1)	Appalachian State (9–2)	Richmond (11–2)	5.
6.	James Madison	James Madison (0–0)	James Madison (0–1)	James Madison (1–1)	James Madison (2–1)	Southern Illinois (3–1)	Villanova (5–1)	Northern Iowa (5–2)	Elon (6–1)	Elon (7–1)	Elon (8–1)	Appalachian State (8–2)	William & Mary (9–2)	Southern Illinois (11–2)	6.
7.	Southern Illinois	William & Mary (1–0) (1)	New Hampshire (2–0)	New Hampshire (2–0)	New Hampshire (3–0)	McNeese State (3–1)	William & Mary (5–1)	Elon (5–1)	New Hampshire (6–1)	New Hampshire (7–1)	New Hampshire (8–1)	South Carolina State (9–1)	South Carolina State (10–1)	New Hampshire (10–3)	7.
8.	New Hampshire	Southern Illinois (0–1)	Southern Illinois (0–1)	Southern Illinois (1–1)	Southern Illinois (2–1)	William & Mary (4–1)	Central Arkansas (4–1)	New Hampshire (5–1)	Appalachian State (5–2)	Appalachian State (6–2)	Appalachian State (7–2)	McNeese State (8–2)	McNeese State (9–2)	South Carolina State (10–2)	8.
9.	Weber State	New Hampshire (1–0)	Appalachian State (0–2)	McNeese State (3–0) (1)	McNeese State (3–1)	Central Arkansas (3–1)	Elon (5–1)	Appalachian State (4–2)	South Dakota State (6–1)	South Dakota State (7–1)	South Carolina State (8–1)	New Hampshire (8–2)	Elon (9–2)	Stephen F. Austin (10–3)	9.
10.	Wofford	Weber State (0–1)	McNeese State (2–0) (1)	Appalachian State (0–2)	Appalachian State (1–2)	Appalachian State (2–2)	Appalachian State (3–2)	South Carolina State (5–1)	South Carolina State (6–1)	South Carolina State (7–1)	McNeese State (7–2)	Elon (8–2)	New Hampshire (9–2)	Elon (9–3)	10.
11.	Elon	Elon (1–0)	Elon (2–0)	Weber State (1–2)	Weber State (2–2)	Elon (4–1)	McNeese State (3–2)	McNeese State (4–2)	McNeese State (5–2)	McNeese State (6–2)	Northern Iowa (6–3)	Northern Iowa (7–3)	South Dakota State (8–3)	South Dakota State (8–4)	11.
12.	Central Arkansas	Central Arkansas (0–1)	Weber State (0–2)	Central Arkansas (1–1)	Central Arkansas (2–1)	James Madison (2–2)	South Carolina State (4–1)	Jacksonville State (4–2)	Central Arkansas (5–2)	Northern Iowa (5–3)	South Dakota State (7–2)	South Dakota State (7–3)	Stephen F. Austin (9–2)	McNeese State (9–3)	12.
13.	Cal Poly	Cal Poly (0–0)	Central Arkansas (0–1)	Elon (2–1)	Elon (3–1)	UMass (3–1)	Jacksonville State (4–2)	South Dakota State (5–1)	Weber State (5–3)	Eastern Illinois (7–2)	Eastern Illinois (7–2)	Eastern Illinois (8–2) т	Jacksonville State (8–3)	Eastern Washington (8–4)	13.
14.	William & Mary	Wofford (0–1)	Cal Poly (1–0)	Cal Poly (1–1)	South Carolina State (3–0)	Cal Poly (2–2)	South Dakota State (4–1)	Central Arkansas (4–2)	Northern Iowa (5–3)	Holy Cross (7–1)	Holy Cross (8–1)	Holy Cross (9–1) т	Eastern Washington (8–3)	Holy Cross (9–3)	14.
15.	McNeese State	South Carolina State (1–0)	Wofford (1–1)	UMass (2–1)	South Dakota State (3–0)	Eastern Washington (4–1)	Weber State (3–3)	Weber State (4–3)	Stephen F. Austin (6–1)	Jacksonville State (5–3)	Jacksonville State (6–3)	Jacksonville State (7–3)	Northern Iowa (7–4)	Eastern Illinois (8–4)	15.
16.	South Carolina State	McNeese State (1–0)	South Carolina State (2–0)	South Carolina State (2–0)	UMass (3–1)	South Carolina State (3–1)	James Madison (2–3)	UMass (4–2)	Cal Poly (4–3)	Eastern Washington (6–3)	Liberty (7–2)	Stephen F. Austin (8–2)	Prairie View A&M (8–1)	Jacksonville State (8–3)	16.
17.	Eastern Washington	Eastern Washington (1–0)	UMass (1–1)	Wofford (1–2)	Cal Poly (1–2)	Eastern Kentucky (3–1)	Eastern Washington (4–2)	Colgate (7–0)	Holy Cross (6–1)	Liberty (6–2)	Stephen F. Austin (7–2)	Liberty (8–2)	Eastern Illinois (8–3)	Weber State (7–5)	17.
18.	UMass	UMass (0–1)	Texas State (1–0)	South Dakota State (2–0)	Eastern Washington (3–1)	Jacksonville State (3–2)	Colgate (6–0)	Stephen F. Austin (5–1)	Delaware (5–2)	Stephen F. Austin (6–2)	Eastern Washington (6–3)	Eastern Washington (7–3)	Weber State (7–4)	Northern Iowa (7–4)	18.
19.	Jacksonville State	Texas State (1–0)	Maine (2–0)	Texas State (1–1)	Texas State (2–1)	South Dakota State (3–1)	Cal Poly (2–3)	Cal Poly (3–3)	Eastern Illinois (6–2)	Central Arkansas (5–3)	Prairie View A&M (6–1)	Prairie View A&M (7–1)	Holy Cross (9–2)	Prairie View A&M (9–1)	19.
20.	Maine	Maine (1–0)	Eastern Washington (1–1)	Eastern Washington (2–1)	Jacksonville State (2–2)	Holy Cross (4–0)	UMass (3–2)	Eastern Kentucky (4–2)	Jacksonville State (4–3)	Colgate (8–1)	Lafayette (8–1)	Weber State (6–4)	Colgate (9–2)	Colgate (9–2)	20.
21.	Texas State	Jacksonville State (0–1)	South Dakota State (1–0)	Jacksonville State (1–2)	Eastern Kentucky (2–1)	Weber State (2–3)	Stephen F. Austin (4–1)	Eastern Washington (4–3)	Eastern Washington (5–3)	Weber State (5–4)	Florida A&M (7–2)	Colgate (9–2)	Florida A&M (8–3)	Liberty (8–3)	21.
22.	Harvard	Harvard (0–0)	Jacksonville State (0–2)	Eastern Kentucky (1–1)	Holy Cross (3–0)	Florida A&M (4–0)	Florida A&M (4–1)	Holy Cross (5–1)	Northern Arizona (5–2)	Prairie View A&M (5–1)	Weber State (5–4)	Lafayette (8–2)	Liberty (8–3)	Florida A&M (8–3)	22.
23.	South Dakota State	Eastern Kentucky (0–1)	Eastern Kentucky (0–1)	Holy Cross (3–0)	Florida A&M (4–0)	Montana State (3–1)	Eastern Kentucky (3–2)	Delaware (5–2)	UMass (4–3)	Florida A&M (6–2)	Delaware (6–3)	Montana State (7–3)	Pennsylvania (8–2)	Pennsylvania (8–2)	23.
24.	Hofstra	Liberty (0–1)	Liberty (1–1)	Liberty (2–1)	Eastern Illinois (4–0)	Colgate (5–0)	Holy Cross (4–1)	Eastern Illinois (5–2)	Liberty (5–2)	Lafayette (7–1)	Colgate (8–2)	Florida A&M (7–3)	Lafayette (8–3)	Texas State (7–4)	24.
25.	Grambling State	South Dakota State (0–0)	Harvard (0–0)	Florida A&M (3–0)	Montana State (2–1)	Eastern Illinois (4–1)	Eastern Illinois (4–2)	Northern Arizona (4–2)	Colgate (7–1) т	Delaware (5–3)	Texas State (6–3)	Pennsylvania (7–2)	Montana State (7–4)	Lafayette (8–3)	25.
26.									Prairie View A&M (5–1) т						26.
	Preseason	Week 1 Sept 8	Week 2 Sept 15	Week 3 Sept 22	Week 4 Sept 29	Week 5 Oct 6	Week 6 Oct 13	Week 7 Oct 20	Week 8 Oct 27	Week 9 Nov 3	Week 10 Nov 10	Week 11 Nov 17	Week 12 Nov 24	Week 13 Postseason	
		Dropped: 24 Hofstra; 25 Grambling State	None	Dropped: 19 Maine; 25 Harvard	Dropped: 17 Wofford; 24 Liberty	Dropped: 19 Texas State	Dropped: 23 Montana State	Dropped: 16 James Madison; 22 Florida A&M	Dropped: 20 Eastern Kentucky	Dropped: 16 Cal Poly; 22 Northern Arizona; 23 UMass	Dropped: 19 Central Arkansas	Dropped: 23 Delaware; 25 Texas State	None	Dropped: 25 Montana State	
