= Stephen F. Austin Lumberjacks football =

Intercollegiate American football team

2026 Stephen F. Austin Lumberjacks football team
- First season: 1923; 103 years ago
- Athletic director: Michael McBroom
- Head coach: Colby Carthel; 8th season, 43–37 (.538)
- Location: Nacogdoches, Texas
- Stadium: Homer Bryce Stadium (capacity: 14,575)
- NCAA division: Division I FCS
- Conference: Southland
- Colors: Purple and white
- All-time record: 436–547–30 (.445)
- Bowl record: 1–0 (1.000)

Conference championships
- Gulf Star: 1985 SLC: 1989, 1999, 2009, 2010, 2025, 2026 WAC: 2022
- Rivalries: Northwestern State Demons (rivalry); Sam Houston Bearkats (rivalry; dormant)
- Website: www.sfajacks.com

The Stephen F. Austin Lumberjacks football program is the intercollegiate American football team for Stephen F. Austin State University (SFA) located in the U.S. state of Texas. The team competes in the NCAA Division I Football Championship Subdivision (FCS) as members of the Southland Conference, which SFA rejoined for the 2024 season after a three-year absence. SFA had played the 2023 season in the United Athletic Conference (UAC), newly formed for the 2023 season as a merger of the football leagues of SFA's previous home of the Western Athletic Conference (WAC) and the Atlantic Sun Conference (ASUN). It replaced an alliance between the two conferences that operated in the 2021 and 2022 seasons.

SFA had long been a member of the Southland Conference (SLC) before joining the WAC in July 2021, the same time that conference relaunched its football league at the FCS level. It returned to the SLC for 2024 and beyond. Stephen F. Austin's first football team was fielded in 1923. The team plays its home games at the 14,575 seat Homer Bryce Stadium in Nacogdoches, Texas.

== Conference championships ==
Year	Coach	Conference	Overall record	Conference record
1985†	Jim Hess	Gulf Star Conference	9–2	4–1
1989	Lynn Graves	Southland Conference	12–2–1	6–0–1
1999†	Mike Santiago	Southland Conference	8–3	6–1
2009†	J. C. Harper	Southland Conference	10–3	6–1
2010	J. C. Harper	Southland Conference	9–3	6–1
2022	Colby Carthel	Western Athletic Conference	6–5	3–1
2025	Colby Carthel	Southland Conference	11–3	8–0
2026†	Colby Carthel	Southland Conference	11–1	8–1
Conference championships			8	

† Co-champions

== Head coaches ==
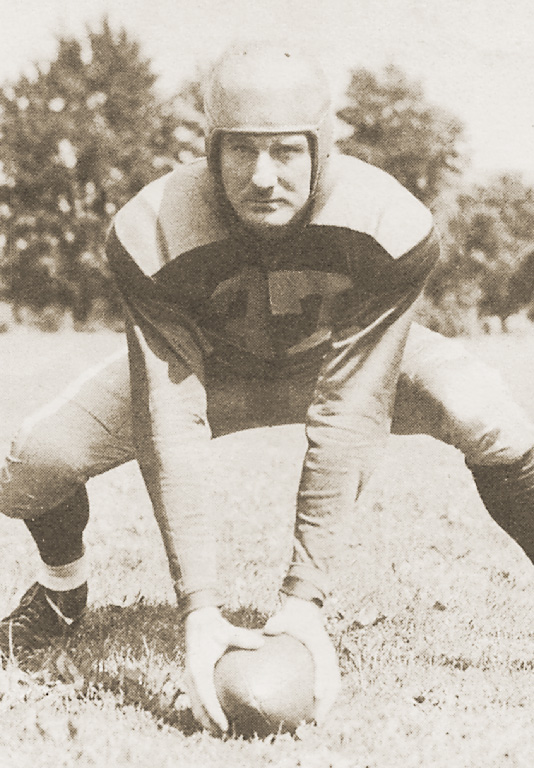
Red Conkright was head coach from 1959 to 1961.

- Bob Shelton (1923–1928)
- Gene White (1929–1936)
- Red Willis (1937–1940)
- Maurice A. Baumgarten (1941)
- No team (1942–1945)
- Bill Pierce (1946)
- Ted Jefferies (1947–1955)
- Harold J. Fischer (1956–1958)
- Red Conkright (1959–1961)
- Shorty Hughes (1962–1970)
- John Levra (1971–1974)
- Dick Munzinger (1975)
- Charles Simmons (1976–1981)
- Jim Hess (1982–1988)
- Lynn Graves (1989–1991)
- John Pearce (1992–1998)
- Mike Santiago (1999–2004)
- Robert McFarland (2005–2006)
- J. C. Harper (2007–2013)
- Clint Conque (2014–2017)
- Jeff Byrd (interim) (2018)
- Colby Carthel (2019–present)

== Notable former players ==
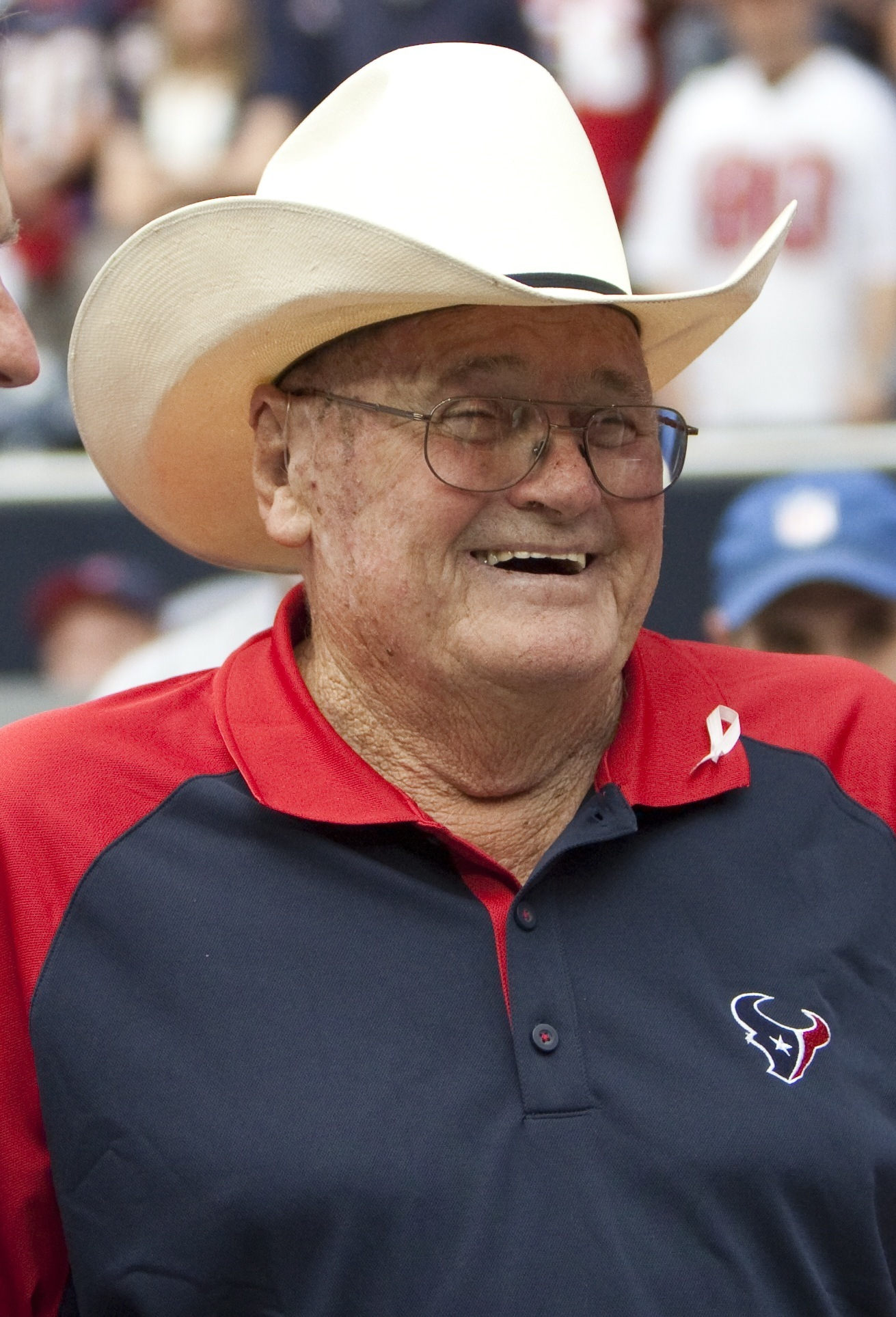
Bum Phillips played college football for the Lumberjacks

Notable alumni include:

:

- Bruce Alexander
- Derrick Blaylock
- Larry Centers
- KaRon Coleman
- Spike Dykes
- John Franklin-Myers
- Todd Hammel
- Sam Hunt
- BJ Thompson
- Willie Jefferson
- Mark Moseley
- Bum Phillips
- Mike Quinn
- James Ritchey
- George Shirkey
- Jeremiah Trotter
- Ben Wells
- Xavier Gipson

== Postseason history ==
The Lumberjacks earned a berth in the NCAA Division I FCS playoffs in 2009, the first postseason appearance for the team since 1995. The 2010 season marked the first time that the school had won an outright conference championship since 1989.

The team's only bowl game was the 1973 Poultry Bowl, in which the team defeated Gardner–Webb, 31–10, in Gainesville, Georgia.

=== Division I-AA/FCS Playoffs results ===
The Lumberjacks have made nine appearances in the Division I-AA/FCS playoffs, with an overall record of 8–9.

Year	Round	Opponent	Result
1988	First Round; Quarterfinals	Jackson State; Georgia Southern	W 24–0; L 6–27
1989	First Round; Quarterfinals; Semifinals; National Championship Game	Grambling State; Southwest Missouri State; Furman; Georgia Southern	W 59–56; W 55–25; W 21–19; L 34–37
1993	First Round	Troy State	L 20–42
1995	First Round; Quarterfinals; Semifinals	Eastern Illinois; Appalachian State; Montana	W 34–29; W 27–17; L 14–70
2009	First Round; Quarterfinals	Eastern Washington; Montana	W 44–33; L 0–51
2010	Second Round	Villanova	L 24–54
2014	First Round	Northern Iowa	L 10–44
2021	First Round	Incarnate Word	L 28–35 ^{OT}
2025	Second Round; Quarterfinals	Abilene Christian; Montana State	W 41–34; L 28–44

== Rivalries ==
The Lumberjacks have active rivalries with the Northwestern State Demons and the Sam Houston Bearkats.

== Future non-conference opponents ==
Announced schedules as of July 29, 2026.

2026	2027	2028	2029	2030
at Abilene Christian	Abilene Christian	at Texas Tech	at Cal Poly	at Louisville
at Prairie View A&M		Northeastern State		Prairie View A&M
Northeastern State				
