= Sperbeck =

Sperbeck is a surname. Notable people with the surname include:

- Jeff Sperbeck (died 2025), American NFL certified contract advisor
- Marshall Sperbeck (born 1960), American college football coach and former player
- Thomas Sperbeck (born 1994), American football player

== See also ==
- Saerbeck
