= Charles Simmons (American football) =

American football coach and college athletics administrator

Biographical details
- Born: September 15, 1931; Nacogdoches County, Texas, U.S.
- Died: February 23, 2020 (aged 88); Nacogdoches, Texas, U.S.

Playing career
- 1949–1950: Del Mar
- 1954–1955: Stephen F. Austin
- Positions: Fullback, guard

Coaching career (HC unless noted)
- 1957–1960: Carthage HS (TX) (assistant)
- 1961: Leverett's Chapel HS (TX)
- 1962: DeKalb HS (TX)
- 1963–1966: Stephen F. Austin (OL)
- 1967–1975: Kilgore
- 1976–1981: Stephen F. Austin

Administrative career (AD unless noted)
- 1976–1981: Stephen F. Austin

Head coaching record
- Overall: 19–44–1 (college); 55–34–3 (junior college); 9–11 (high school)
- Bowls: 0–1 (junior college)

Accomplishments and honors

Championships
- 3 TJCFF (1968, 1970, 1975)

Awards
- LSC Coach of the Year (1979)

Charles Wayne Simmons (September 15, 1931 – February 23, 2020) was an American football coach and college athletics administrator. He served as the head football coach at Kilgore College in Kilgore, Texas from 1967 to 1975 and Stephen F. Austin State University in Nacogdoches, Texas from 1976 to 1981. Simmons was also the athletic director at Stephen F. Austin during the same years.

A native of Nacogdoches, Simmons graduated from Nacogdoches High School. He then played football at Del Mar College in Corpus Christi, Texas and Stephen F. Austin. After graduating from Stephen F. Austin in 1957, Simmons spent four years as an assistant footfall coach at Carthage High School in Carthage, Texas. He was the head football coach at Leverett's Chapel High School in 1961 and DeKalb High School (TX) of De Kalb, Texas in 1962. Simmons returned to Stephen F. Austin in 1963 and worked as offensive line coach for four seasons under Shorty Hughes. He succeeded Boyd Converse as head football coach at Kilgore in 1967. Simmons led Kilgore to three Texas Junior College Football Federation (TJCFF) titles, in 1968, 1970, 1975.

Simmons was named Lone Star Conference (LSC) Coach of the Year in 1979 after leading Stephen F. Austin and an 8–3 record a title for second place in the conference. He was fired from his post at head football coach and athletic director following the 1981 season.

Simmons died on February 23, 2020, at his home in Nacogdoches.

== Head coaching record ==
=== College ===
Year	Team	Overall	Conference	Standing	Bowl/playoffs	NAIA Division I^{#}
Stephen F. Austin Lumberjacks (Lone Star Conference) (1976–1981)
1976	Stephen F. Austin	1–9–1	1–6	8th		
1977	Stephen F. Austin	2–8	2–5	6th		
1978	Stephen F. Austin	3–8	3–4	T–5th		
1979	Stephen F. Austin	8–3	5–2	T–2nd		17
1980	Stephen F. Austin	4–6	4–3	5th		
1981	Stephen F. Austin	1–10	0–7	8th		
Stephen F. Austin:		19–44–1	15–27			
Total:		19–44–1				

=== Junior college ===
Year	Team	Overall	Conference	Standing	Bowl/playoffs
Kilgore Rangers (Texas Junior College Football Federation) (1967–1875)
1967	Kilgore	5–5	4–3	T–3rd	
1968	Kilgore	7–3	6–1	T–1st	
1969	Kilgore	4–6	4–3	3rd	
1970	Kilgore	7–2–1	6–0–1	1st	
1971	Kilgore	8–2–1	6–1	2nd	L Wool Bowl
1972	Kilgore	6–4	4–3	4th	
1973	Kilgore	4–6	3–4	T–4th	
1974	Kilgore	6–3–1	4–3	4th	
1975	Kilgore	8–3	5–1	1st	
Kilgore:		55–34–3	42–19–1		
Total:		55–34–3			
National championship Conference title Conference division title or championship game berth

=== High school ===
Year	Team	Overall	Conference	Standing	Bowl/playoffs
Leverett's Chapel Lions () (1961)
1961	Leverett's Chapel	4–6			
Leverett's Chapel:		4–6			
DeKalb Bears () (1962)
1962	DeKalb	5–5			
DeKalb:		5–5			
Total:		9–11			
