= Jim Miller (American football coach, born 1932) =

American football coach (1932–2013)

Biographical details
- Born: March 27, 1932; Ennis, Texas, U.S.
- Died: April 13, 2013 (aged 81); Kilgore, Texas, U.S.
- Education: East Texas State University (1959)

Playing career

Football
- 1955–1958: East Texas State
- Position: Lineman

Coaching career (HC unless noted)

Football
- 1959–1962: Corsicana HS (TX) (line)
- 1963–1964: Jacksonville HS (TX) (assistant)
- 1965: Roy Miller HS (TX) (DC)
- 1966: Henderson HS (TX) (assistant)
- 1967–1975: Kilgore (DC)
- 1976–1991: Kilgore

Basketball
- 1959–1962: Corsicana HS (TX) (JV)

Track and field
- 1962: Corsicana HS (TX)

Head coaching record
- Overall: 97–66–2 (football)
- Bowls: 2–3

Accomplishments and honors

Championships
- 1 junior college (1978); 6 TJCFC (1977–1978, 1980–1982, 1990)

Awards
- As player 2× All-LSC (1957–1958); East Texas A&M Hall of Fame (1991); As coach Kilgore Hall of Fame (2002)

James Henry "Buddy" Miller (March 27, 1932 – April 13, 2013) was an American junior college football coach. He was the head football coach for Kilgore College from 1976 to 1991. He also coached for Corsicana High School, Jacksonville High School, Roy Miller High School, and Henderson High School.

== Early life and playing career ==
Miller was born in Ennis, Texas, and attended Ennis High School. He graduated in 1950 and began work as a printer for the Ennis Tag and Salesbrook Company. On May 30, 1953, he married Dianne Percival.

During the Korean War, Miller served in the United States Army. After returning from the military he attended East Texas State University—now known as East Texas A&M University—where he earned his bachelor's and master's degrees in biology, history, and education. He played college football for East Texas State as a lineman. He earned two All-Lone Star Conference (LSC) honors in his junior and senior years. In 1991, he was named to the Texas A&M–Commerce Athletic Hall of Fame.

== Coaching career ==
Miller began his coaching career as an assistant coach throughout high schools in Texas. After graduating from East Texas State, he was hired by Corsicana High School to be the line coach. He was also named as the junior varsity coach for the school's basketball team. He helped lead the team to back-to-back-to-back 8-AAA championships from 1960 to 1962. In 1962, he led the track and field team.

In 1963, Miller accepted an assistant coaching position with Jacksonville High School. After two seasons he was hired as the defensive coordinator for Roy Miller High School. In 1966, he was an assistant coach for Henderson High School.

In 1967, Miller was hired as the defensive coordinator coach for Kilgore, a junior college program in Texas. In 1976, he was named head football coach as the successor to Charles Simmons. After going 2–8 in his first season he led the team to an 8–2 record and a Texas Junior College Football Conference (TJCFC) championship. In 1978, Kilgore finished with a 10–0–1 record and a NJCAA National Football Championship championship and another TJCFC championship. In sixteen seasons as head coach, Miller finished with an overall record of 97–66–2 which was the most of any coach in Kilgore history alongside winning six TJCFC championships.

== Death ==
Miller died on April 13, 2013, in his home in Kilgore, Texas. He is buried in the Danville Cemetery.

== Head coaching record ==
=== Football ===
Year	Team	Overall	Conference	Standing	Bowl/playoffs
Kilgore Rangers (Texas Junior College Football Conference) (1976–1991)
1976	Kilgore	2–8	2–8	6th	
1977	Kilgore	8–2	8–2	T–1st	
1978	Kilgore	10–0–1	9–0–1	1st	W Garland-Texas Bowl
1979	Kilgore	5–5	5–5	5th	
1980	Kilgore	10–1	10–0	1st	L Garland-Texas Bowl
1981	Kilgore	8–2	4–1	T–1st	
1982	Kilgore	7–4	4–1	1st	L Garland-Texas Bowl
1983	Kilgore	6–4	2–3	T–4th	
1984	Kilgore	6–4	5–3	3rd	
1985	Kilgore	5–4–1	3–3	T–3rd	
1986	Kilgore	6–4	3–3	T–2nd	
1987	Kilgore	2–8	2–4	T–5th	
1988	Kilgore	3–7	1–5	6th	
1989	Kilgore	6–5	4–2	2nd	L Texas Shrine Bowl
1990	Kilgore	9–2	6–0	1st	W Texas Shrine Bowl
1991	Kilgore	4–6	0–6	7th	
Kilgore:		97–66–2	68–46–1		
Total:		97–66–2			
National championship Conference title Conference division title or championship game berth
