= 2009 Texas State Bobcats football team =

American college football season

2009 Texas State Bobcats football
- Conference: Southland Conference

Ranking
- Sports Network: No. 25
- FCS Coaches: No. 24
- Record: 7–4 (5–2 SLC)
- Head coach: Brad Wright (3rd season)
- Co-offensive coordinators: Ben Norton (3rd season); Travis Bush (3rd season)
- Offensive scheme: Multiple
- Base defense: 3–4
- Home stadium: Bobcat Stadium

2009 Southland Conference football standings
	Conf.			Overall
Team	W		L	W		L
No. 10 Stephen F. Austin +^	6	–	1	10	–	3
No. 12 McNeese State +^	6	–	1	9	–	2
No. 25 Texas State	5	–	2	7	–	4
Southeastern Louisiana	4	–	3	6	–	5
Sam Houston State	3	–	4	5	–	6
Central Arkansas	2	–	5	5	–	6
Nicholls State	2	–	5	3	–	9
Northwestern State	0	–	7	0	–	11
+ – Conference co-champions; ^ – FCS playoff participant; Rankings from The Sports Network poll

The 2009 Texas State Bobcats football team represented Texas State University–San Marcos—now known as Texas State University—as a member of the Southland Conference (SLV) during the 2009 NCAA Division I FCS football season. Led by third-year head coach Brad Wright, the Bobcats compiled and overall record of 7–4 with a mark of 5–2 in conference play, placing third in the SLC. Texas State played their home games at Bobcat Stadium in San Marcos, Texas.

== Schedule ==
Date	Opponent	Rank	Site	Result	Attendance	Source
September 5	Angelo State*	No. 20	Bobcat Stadium; San Marcos, TX	W 48–28	14,116	
September 19	at No. 15 (FBS) TCU*	No. 19	Amon G. Carter Stadium; Fort Worth, TX	L 21–56	35,249	
September 26	Texas Southern*	No. 23	Bobcat Stadium; San Marcos, TX	W 52–18	12,754	
October 3	at Southern Utah*	No. 22	Eccles Coliseum; Cedar City, UT	L 16–38	4,197	
October 10	Southeastern Louisiana		Bobcat Stadium; San Marcos, TX	L 50–51 ^{OT}	10,566	
October 17	at Nicholls State		John L. Guidry Stadium; Thibodaux, LA (rivalry)	W 34–28	3,583	
October 24	at Northwestern State		Harry Turpin Stadium; Natchitoches, LA	W 20–17	8,113	
October 31	No. 11 Stephen F. Austin		Bobcat Stadium; San Marcos, TX	W 28–7	13,926	
November 7	at No. 20 Central Arkansas		Estes Stadium; Conway, AR	W 27–24	8,249	
November 14	No. 10 McNeese State	No. 25	Bobcat Stadium; San Marcos, TX	L 27–30	13,013	
November 21	Sam Houston State		Bobcat Stadium; San Marcos, TX (rivalry)	W 28–20	9,118	
*Non-conference game; Rankings from The Sports Network Poll released prior to the game
