= 2009 Montana State Bobcats football team =

American college football season

2009 Montana State Bobcats football
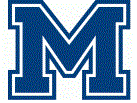
- Conference: Big Sky Conference
- Record: 7–4 (5–3 Big Sky)
- Head coach: Rob Ash (3rd season)
- Defensive coordinator: Jamie Marshall (3rd season)
- Home stadium: Bobcat Stadium

2009 Big Sky Conference football standings
	Conf.			Overall
Team	W		L	W		L
No. 2 Montana $^	8	–	0	14	–	1
No. 13 Eastern Washington ^	6	–	2	8	–	4
No. 17 Weber State ^	6	–	2	7	–	5
Montana State	5	–	3	7	–	4
Northern Arizona	4	–	4	5	–	6
Sacramento State	4	–	4	5	–	6
Northern Colorado	1	–	7	3	–	8
Portland State	1	–	7	2	–	9
Idaho State	1	–	7	1	–	10
$ – Conference champion; ^ – FCS playoff participant; Rankings from The Sports Network poll

The 2009 Montana State Bobcats football team represented Montana State University as a member of the Big Sky Conference in the 2009 NCAA Division I FCS football season. The Bobcats were led by third-year head coach Rob Ash and played their home games at Bobcat Stadium. They finished the season 7–4 overall and 5–3 in the Big Sky to place third.

== Schedule ==
Date	Time	Opponent	Rank	Site	Result
September 5	11:00 a.m.	at Michigan State*		Spartan Stadium; East Lansing, MI	L 3–44
September 12	1:05 p.m.	Dixie State*		Bobcat Stadium; Bozeman, MT	W 23–20
September 26	1:35 p.m.	at Northern Colorado		Nottingham Field; Greenley, CO	W 25–7
October 3	1:35 p.m.	at No. 11 Weber State		Stewart Stadium; Ogden, UT	W 26–21
October 10	1:35 p.m.	Northern Arizona	No. 24	Bobcat Stadium; Bozeman, MT	L 10–23
October 17	1:05 p.m.	South Dakota*		Bobcat Stadium; Bozeman, MT	W 31–24^{OT}
October 24	2:05 p.m.	at Eastern Washington		Woodward Field; Cheney, WA	L 24–35
October 31	1:35 p.m.	Idaho State		Bobcat Stadium; Bozeman, MT	W 41–10
November 7	2:05 p.m.	at Portland State		PGE Park; Portland, OR	W 28–10
November 14	12:05 p.m.	Sacramento State		Bobcat Stadium; Bozeman, MT	W 27–17
November 21	12:05 p.m.	at No. 1 Montana	No. 23	Bobcat Stadium; Bozeman, MT (rivalry)	L 19–33
*Non-conference game; Rankings from The Sports Network Poll released prior to the game; All times are in Mountain time
