= 2009 Northwestern State Demons football team =

American college football season

2009 Northwestern State Demons football
- Conference: Southland Conference
- Record: 0–11 (0–7 Southland)
- Head coach: Bradley Dale Peveto (1st season)
- Offensive coordinator: Todd Cooley (1st season)
- Co-defensive coordinators: Brad Laird (5th season); Shawn Quinn (1st season)
- Home stadium: Harry Turpin Stadium

2009 Southland Conference football standings
	Conf.			Overall
Team	W		L	W		L
No. 10 Stephen F. Austin +^	6	–	1	10	–	3
No. 12 McNeese State +^	6	–	1	9	–	2
No. 25 Texas State	5	–	2	7	–	4
Southeastern Louisiana	4	–	3	6	–	5
Sam Houston State	3	–	4	5	–	6
Central Arkansas	2	–	5	5	–	6
Nicholls State	2	–	5	3	–	9
Northwestern State	0	–	7	0	–	11
+ – Conference co-champions; ^ – FCS playoff participant; Rankings from The Sports Network poll

The 2009 Northwestern State Demons football team represented Northwestern State University as a member of the Southland Conference during the 2009 NCAA Division I FCS football season. Led by first-year head coach Bradley Dale Peveto, the Demons compiled an overall record of 0–11 with a mark of 0–7 in conference play, placing last in the Southland. Northwestern State played home games at Harry Turpin Stadium in Natchitoches, Louisiana.

== Schedule ==
Date	Time	Opponent	Site	TV	Result	Attendance	Source
September 5	6:00 pm	at Houston*	Robertson Stadium; Houston, TX		L 7–55	22,043	
September 12	6:00 pm	at Grambling State*	Eddie G. Robinson Memorial Stadium; Grambling, LA		L 17–38	19,600	
September 19	6:00 pm	North Dakota*	Harry Turpin Stadium; Natchitoches, LA	SCTN	L 20–27	10,258	
September 26	6:00 pm	at Baylor*	Floyd Casey Stadium; Waco, TX		L 13–68	36,452	
October 10	7:00 pm	No. 9 Central Arkansas	Harry Turpin Stadium; Natchitoches, LA		L 0–34	4,829	
October 17	7:00 pm	at No. 13 McNeese State	Cowboy Stadium; Lake Charles, LA (rivalry)		L 23–51	16,132	
October 24	7:00 pm	Texas State^{†}	Harry Turpin Stadium; Natchitoches, LA	TSAA	L 17–20	8,113	
October 31	6:00 pm	at Sam Houston State	Bowers Stadium; Huntsville, TX	SCTN	L 30–34	2,134	
November 7	2:00 pm	Southeastern Louisiana	Harry Turpin Stadium; Natchitoches, LA (rivalry)		L 0–27	6,523	
November 14	1:00 pm	at Nicholls State	Manning Field at John L. Guidry Stadium; Thibodaux, LA (NSU Challenge)		L 21–28	4,234	
November 21	2:00 pm	Stephen F. Austin	Harry Turpin Stadium; Natchitoches, LA (Chief Caddo)	-	L 10–19	3,488	
*Non-conference game; ^{†}Homecoming; Rankings from The Sports Network Poll released prior to the game; All times are in Central time
