= 2009 South Dakota State Jackrabbits football team =

American college football season

2009 South Dakota State Jackrabbits football

NCAA Division I Quarterfinal, L 48–61 vs Montana
- Conference: Missouri Valley Football Conference

Ranking
- Sports Network: No. 11
- FCS Coaches: No. 11
- Record: 8–4 (7–1 MVFC)
- Head coach: John Stiegelmeier (13th season)
- Offensive coordinator: Luke Meadows (8th season)
- Co-defensive coordinators: Clint Brown (1st season); Jay Bubak (1st season)
- Home stadium: Coughlin–Alumni Stadium

2009 Missouri Valley Football Conference standings
	Conf.			Overall
Team	W		L	W		L
No. 6 Southern Illinois $^	8	–	0	11	–	2
No. 11 South Dakota State ^	7	–	1	8	–	3
No. 18 Northern Iowa	5	–	3	7	–	4
Illinois State	5	–	3	6	–	5
Missouri State	4	–	4	6	–	5
Youngstown State	4	–	4	6	–	5
North Dakota State	2	–	6	3	–	8
Indiana State	1	–	7	1	–	10
Western Illinois	0	–	8	1	–	10
$ – Conference champion; ^ – FCS playoff participant; Rankings from The Sports Network poll

The 2009 South Dakota State Jackrabbits football team represented South Dakota State University as a member of the Missouri Valley Football Conference (MVFC) during the 2009 NCAA Division I FCS football season. Led by 13th-year head coach John Stiegelmeier, the Jackrabbits compiled an overall record of 8–4 with a mark of 7–1 in conference play, placing in second in the MVFC. South Dakota State played their home games at Coughlin–Alumni Stadium in Brookings, South Dakota. South Dakota State received an at–large bid to the NCAA Division I Football Championship playoffs, where the Jackrabbits were defeated by the Montana Grizzlies in the first round. The team was ranked No. 11 in The Sports Network's postseason ranking of FCS teams.

== Schedule ==
Date	Time	Opponent	Rank	Site	TV	Result	Attendance	Source
September 12	6:00 pm	Georgia Southern*	No. 21	Coughlin–Alumni Stadium; Brookings, SD		W 44–6	12,354	
September 19	6:00 pm	Indiana State	No. 18	Coughlin–Alumni Stadium; Brookings, SD		W 41–0	13,945	
September 26	7:00 pm	at Illinois State	No. 17	Hancock Stadium; Normal, IL		W 38–17	7,833	
October 3	6:00 pm	at No. 19 Cal Poly*	No. 16	Alex G. Spanos Stadium; San Luis Obispo, CA		L 14–21	10,331	
October 10	2:00 pm	Missouri State	No. 19	Plaster Sports Complex; Springfield, MO		W 24–17	10,592	
October 17	6:00 pm	North Dakota State	No. 14	Coughlin–Alumni Stadium; Brookings, SD (Dakota Marker)	KNBN-TV	W 28–13	14,188	
October 24	2:00 pm	No. 6 Northern Iowa	No. 11	Coughlin–Alumni Stadium; Brookings, SD	Mediacom (Ch. 10)/Midcontinent (Ch. 23)	W 24–14	15,523	
October 31	4:00 pm	at Youngstown State	No. 9	Stambaugh Stadium; Youngstown, OH	KDLT-TV/Comcast SportsNet Chicago/MyYTV	W 17–3	10,780	
November 7	1:00 pm	No. 3 Southern Illinois	No. 9	Coughlin–Alumni Stadium; Brookings, SD		L 15–34	10,317	
November 14	11:00 pm	at Minnesota*	No. 12	TCF Bank Stadium; Minneapolis, MN	BTN	L 13–16	50,805	
November 21	1:00 pm	at Western Illinois	No. 12	Hanson Field; Macomb, IL		W 27–7	1,508	
November 28	1:00 pm	No. 2 Montana	No. 11	Washington–Grizzly Stadium; Missoula, MT (NCAA Division I First Round)	KELO-TV/KPAX-TV	L 48–61	19,197	
*Non-conference game; Rankings from The Sports Network Poll released prior to the game; All times are in Central time
