= 2009 Illinois State Redbirds football team =

American college football season

2009 Illinois State Redbirds football
- Conference: Missouri Valley Football Conference
- Record: 6–5 (5–3 MVFC)
- Head coach: Brock Spack (1st season)
- Offensive coordinator: Steve Farmer (1st season)
- Defensive coordinator: Phil Elmassian (1st season)
- MVPs: Matt Brown; Eric Brunner
- Captains: Matt Brown; Drew Kiel; Doni Phelps
- Home stadium: Hancock Stadium

2009 Missouri Valley Football Conference standings
	Conf.			Overall
Team	W		L	W		L
No. 6 Southern Illinois $^	8	–	0	11	–	2
No. 11 South Dakota State ^	7	–	1	8	–	3
No. 18 Northern Iowa	5	–	3	7	–	4
Illinois State	5	–	3	6	–	5
Missouri State	4	–	4	6	–	5
Youngstown State	4	–	4	6	–	5
North Dakota State	2	–	6	3	–	8
Indiana State	1	–	7	1	–	10
Western Illinois	0	–	8	1	–	10
$ – Conference champion; ^ – FCS playoff participant; Rankings from The Sports Network poll

The 2009 Illinois State Redbirds football team represented Illinois State University as a member of the Missouri Valley Football Conference (MVFC) during the 2009 NCAA Division I FCS football season. Led by first-year head coach Brock Spack, the Redbirds compiled an overall record of 6–5 with a mark of 5–3 in conference play, tying for third place in the MVFC. Illinois State played home games at Hancock Stadium in Normal, Illinois.

== Schedule ==
Date	Opponent	Site	Result	Attendance	Source
September 3	at Eastern Illinois*	O'Brien Field; Charleston, IL (rivalry)	L 6–31	10,013	
September 12	at Illinois*	Memorial Stadium; Champaign, IL	L 17–45	62,347	
September 19	Austin Peay*	Hancock Stadium; Normal, IL	W 38–7	10,158	
September 26	No. 17 South Dakota State	Hancock Stadium; Normal, IL	L 17–38	7,833	
October 3	at North Dakota State	Fargodome; Fargo, ND	W 27–24	18,608	
October 10	at No. 6 Southern Illinois	McAndrew Stadium; Carbondale, IL	L 23–43	11,153	
October 17	Indiana State^{†}	Hancock Stadium; Normal, IL	W 38–21	11,514	
October 31	at Missouri State	Robert W. Plaster Stadium; Springfield, MO	W 24–14	12,115	
November 7	Western Illinois	Hancock Stadium; Normal, IL	W 25–7	12,074	
November 14	at Youngstown State	Stambaugh Stadium; Youngstown, OH	L 18–30	12,493	
November 21	No. 9 Northern Iowa	Hancock Stadium; Normal, IL	W 22–20	6,287	
*Non-conference game; ^{†}Homecoming; Rankings from The Sports Network Poll released prior to the game
