= 2009 Nicholls State Colonels football team =

American college football season

2009 Nicholls State Colonels football
- Conference: Southland Conference
- Record: 3–8 (2–5 Southland)
- Head coach: Jay Thomas (6th season)
- Offensive coordinator: H. T. Kinney (6th season)
- Offensive scheme: Spread option
- Defensive coordinator: Jeremy Atwell (1st season)
- Base defense: Multiple 4–3
- Home stadium: John L. Guidry Stadium

2009 Southland Conference football standings
	Conf.			Overall
Team	W		L	W		L
No. 10 Stephen F. Austin +^	6	–	1	10	–	3
No. 12 McNeese State +^	6	–	1	9	–	2
No. 25 Texas State	5	–	2	7	–	4
Southeastern Louisiana	4	–	3	6	–	5
Sam Houston State	3	–	4	5	–	6
Central Arkansas	2	–	5	5	–	6
Nicholls State	2	–	5	3	–	9
Northwestern State	0	–	7	0	–	11
+ – Conference co-champions; ^ – FCS playoff participant; Rankings from The Sports Network poll

The 2009 Nicholls State Colonels football team represented Nicholls State University as a member of the Southland Conference during the 2009 NCAA Division I FCS football season. Led by Jay Thomas in his sixth and final season as head coach, the Colonels compiled an overall record of 3–8 with a mark of 2–5 in conference play, tying for sixth place in the Southland. Nicholls State played home games at John L. Guidry Stadium in Thibodaux, Louisiana.

== Schedule ==
Date	Time	Opponent	Site	Result	Attendance	Source
September 5	1:00 p.m.	at Air Force*	Falcon Stadium; Colorado Springs, CO	L 0–72	42,205	
September 12	1:00 p.m.	Duquesne*	John L. Guidry Stadium; Thibodaux, LA	W 14–7	5,383	
September 19	6:00 p.m.	at Louisiana Tech*	Joe Aillet Stadium; Ruston, LA	L 13–48	19,400	
September 26	3:00 p.m.	No. 22 Jacksonville State*	John L. Guidry Stadium; Thibodaux, LA	L 10–60	8,213	
October 10	2:00 p.m.	at Sam Houston State	Bowers Stadium; Huntsville, TX	L 21–44	11,144	
October 17	1:00 p.m.	Texas State	John L. Guidry Stadium; Thibodaux, LA (Battle for the Paddle)	L 28–34	3,583	
October 24	6:00 p.m.	at No. 18 Central Arkansas	Estes Stadium; Conway, AR	L 13–42	10,653	
October 31	1:00 p.m.	No. 13 McNeese State	John L. Guidry Stadium; Thibodaux, LA	L 17–38	5,989	
November 7	6:00 p.m.	at No. 15 Stephen F. Austin	Homer Bryce Stadium; Nacogdoches, TX	L 27–31	10,214	
November 14	1:00 p.m.	Northwestern State	John L. Guidry Stadium; Thibodaux, LA (NSU Challenge)	W 28–21	4,324	
November 19	6:00 p.m.	at Southeastern Louisiana	Strawberry Stadium; Hammond, LA (River Bell Classic)	W 45–30	5,551	
*Non-conference game; Rankings from The Sports Network Poll released prior to the game; All times are in Central time
