= 2009 Southeastern Louisiana Lions football team =

American college football season

2009 Southeastern Louisiana Lions football
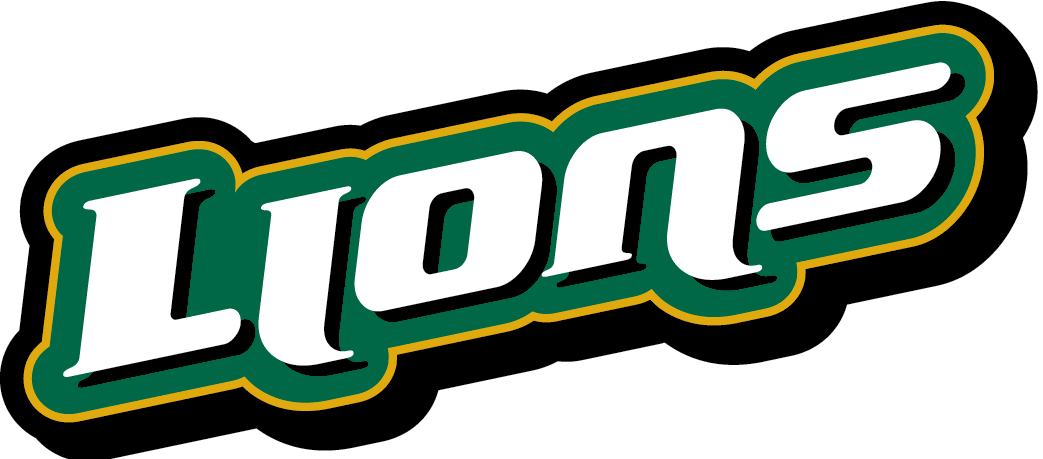
- Conference: Southland Conference
- Record: 6–5 (4–3 Southland)
- Head coach: Mike Lucas (3rd season)
- Offensive coordinator: Tommy Condell (3rd season)
- Home stadium: Strawberry Stadium

2009 Southland Conference football standings
	Conf.			Overall
Team	W		L	W		L
No. 10 Stephen F. Austin +^	6	–	1	10	–	3
No. 12 McNeese State +^	6	–	1	9	–	2
No. 25 Texas State	5	–	2	7	–	4
Southeastern Louisiana	4	–	3	6	–	5
Sam Houston State	3	–	4	5	–	6
Central Arkansas	2	–	5	5	–	6
Nicholls State	2	–	5	3	–	9
Northwestern State	0	–	7	0	–	11
+ – Conference co-champions; ^ – FCS playoff participant; Rankings from The Sports Network poll

The 2009 Southeastern Louisiana Lions football team represented Southeastern Louisiana University as a member of the Southland Conference during the 2009 NCAA Division I FCS football season. Led by third-year head coach Mike Lucas, the Lions compiled an overall record of 6–5 with a mark of 4–3 in conference play, placing fourth in the Southland. Southeastern Louisiana played home games at Strawberry Stadium in Hammond, Louisiana.

== Schedule ==
Date	Time	Opponent	Site	TV	Result	Attendance	Source
September 5	6:00 pm	Texas A&M–Commerce*	Strawberry Stadium; Hammond, LA		W 41–7	5,255	
September 10	7:00 pm	Union (KY)*	Strawberry Stadium; Hammond, LA		W 69–20	4,704	
September 19	6:30 pm	at No. 5 (FBS) Ole Miss*	Vaught–Hemingway Stadium; Oxford, MS	CSS	L 6–52	58,119	
September 26	4:05 pm	at South Dakota*	DakotaDome; Vermillion, SD		L 13–44	8,121	
October 10	2:00 pm	at Texas State	Bobcat Stadium; San Marcos, TX		W 51–50 ^{OT}	10,566	
October 17	6:00 pm	Sam Houston State^{†}	Strawberry Stadium; Hammond, LA	Southeastern Channel	W 37–21	6,902	
October 24	6:00 pm	at No. 12 McNeese State	Cowboy Stadium; Lake Charles, LA	SCTN	L 35–36	13,008	
October 31	2:00 pm	No. 12 Central Arkansas	Strawberry Stadium; Hammond, LA		W 25–21	4,261	
November 7	2:00 pm	at Northwestern State	Harry Turpin Stadium; Natchitoches, LA (rivalry)		W 27–0	6,523	
November 14	2:00 pm	No. 15 Stephen F. Austin	Strawberry Stadium; Hammond, LA	Southeastern Channel	L 10–41	6,877	
November 19	6:00 pm	Nicholls State	Strawberry Stadium; Hammond, LA (River Bell Classic)	SCTN	L 30–45	5,551	
*Non-conference game; ^{†}Homecoming; Rankings from The Sports Network Poll released prior to the game; All times are in Central time
