= 2009 Northern Colorado Bears football team =

American college football season

2009 Northern Colorado Bears football
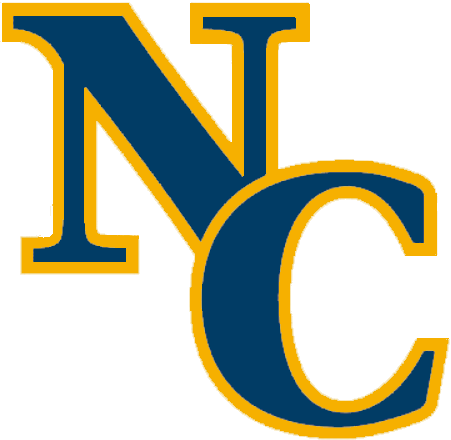
- Conference: Big Sky Conference
- Record: 3–8 (1–7 Big Sky)
- Head coach: Scott Downing (4th season)
- Home stadium: Nottingham Field

2009 Big Sky Conference football standings
| | Conf. | | | Overall |
| Team | W | | L | W | | L |
|---|---|---|---|---|---|---|
| No. 2 Montana $^ | 8 | – | 0 | 14 | – | 1 |
| No. 13 Eastern Washington ^ | 6 | – | 2 | 8 | – | 4 |
| No. 17 Weber State ^ | 6 | – | 2 | 7 | – | 5 |
| Montana State | 5 | – | 3 | 7 | – | 4 |
| Northern Arizona | 4 | – | 4 | 5 | – | 6 |
| Sacramento State | 4 | – | 4 | 5 | – | 6 |
| Northern Colorado | 1 | – | 7 | 3 | – | 8 |
| Portland State | 1 | – | 7 | 2 | – | 9 |
| Idaho State | 1 | – | 7 | 1 | – | 10 |
$ – Conference champion; ^ – FCS playoff participant; Rankings from The Sports Network poll

The 2009 Northern Colorado Bears football team represented the University of Northern Colorado in the 2009 NCAA Division I FCS football season. The Bears were led by fourth-year head coach Scott Downing and played their home games at Nottingham Field. They were a member of the Big Sky Conference. They finished the season 3–8 overall and 1–7 in the Big Sky to place in a three-way tie for fifth.

== Schedule ==
| Date | Time | Opponent | Site | Result |
|---|---|---|---|---|
| September 5 | 6:00 p.m. | at (FBS) No. 25 Kansas* | Memorial Stadium; Lawrence, KS | L 3–49 |
| September 12 | 1:35 p.m. | San Diego* | Nottingham Field; Greeley, CO | W 31–12 |
| September 19 | 1:50 p.m. | at No. 20 Eastern Washington | Woodward Field; Cheney, WA | L 0–16 |
| September 26 | 1:35 p.m. | Montana State | Nottingham Field; Greeley, CO | L 7–25 |
| October 3 | 3:50 p.m. | at Northern Arizona | Walkup Skydome; Flagstaff, AZ | L 27–35 |
| October 10 | 1:35 p.m. | Portland State | Nottingham Field; Greeley, CO | L 18–23 |
| October 17 | 3:30 p.m. | at Idaho State | Holt Arena; Pocatello, ID | W 30–7 |
| October 24 | 1:35 p.m. | No. 16 Weber State | Nottingham Field; Greeley, CO | L 20–28 |
| October 31 | 1:35 p.m. | South Dakota* | Nottingham Field; Greeley, CO | W 21–17 |
| November 7 | 12:50 p.m. | Sacramento State | Nottingham Field; Greeley, CO | L 35–38 |
| November 14 | 12:00 p.m. | at Montana | Washington–Grizzly Stadium; Missoula, MT | L 10–38 |
*Non-conference game; Rankings from The Sports Network Poll released prior to the game; All times are in Mountain time
