= DeKalb High School (Texas) =

Dekalb High School

Location
- 152 West Maple Street; DeKalb, Bowie County, Texas 75559; United States; 33.507633°N 94.623474°W

Information
- School type: Public, high school
- Locale: Rural: Distant
- School district: DeKalb ISD
- Superintendent: Donna McDaniel
- NCES School ID: 481657001422
- Principal: Clayton Little
- Teaching staff: 27.95 (on an FTE basis)
- Grades: 9‍–‍12
- Enrollment: 278 (2023–2024)
- Student to teacher ratio: 9.95
- Colors: Orange and black
- Team name: Bears
- Rivals: New Boston High School
- Website: Official website

DeKalb High School is a public high school located in DeKalb, Texas. It is the sole high school in the DeKalb Independent School District and is classified as a 3A school by the University Interscholastic League (UIL). During 2022‍–‍2023, DeKalb High School had an enrollment of 272 students and a student to teacher ratio of 11.16. The school received an overall rating of "B" from the Texas Education Agency for the 2024‍–‍2025 school year

== Athletics ==
The DeKalb Mighty Bears compete in the following sports:

- Baseball
- Basketball
- Cross Country
- Football
- Golf
- Powerlifting
- Softball
- Tennis
- Track and Field
- Volleyball
