= 2009 Sam Houston State Bearkats football team =

American college football season

2009 Sam Houston State Bearkats football
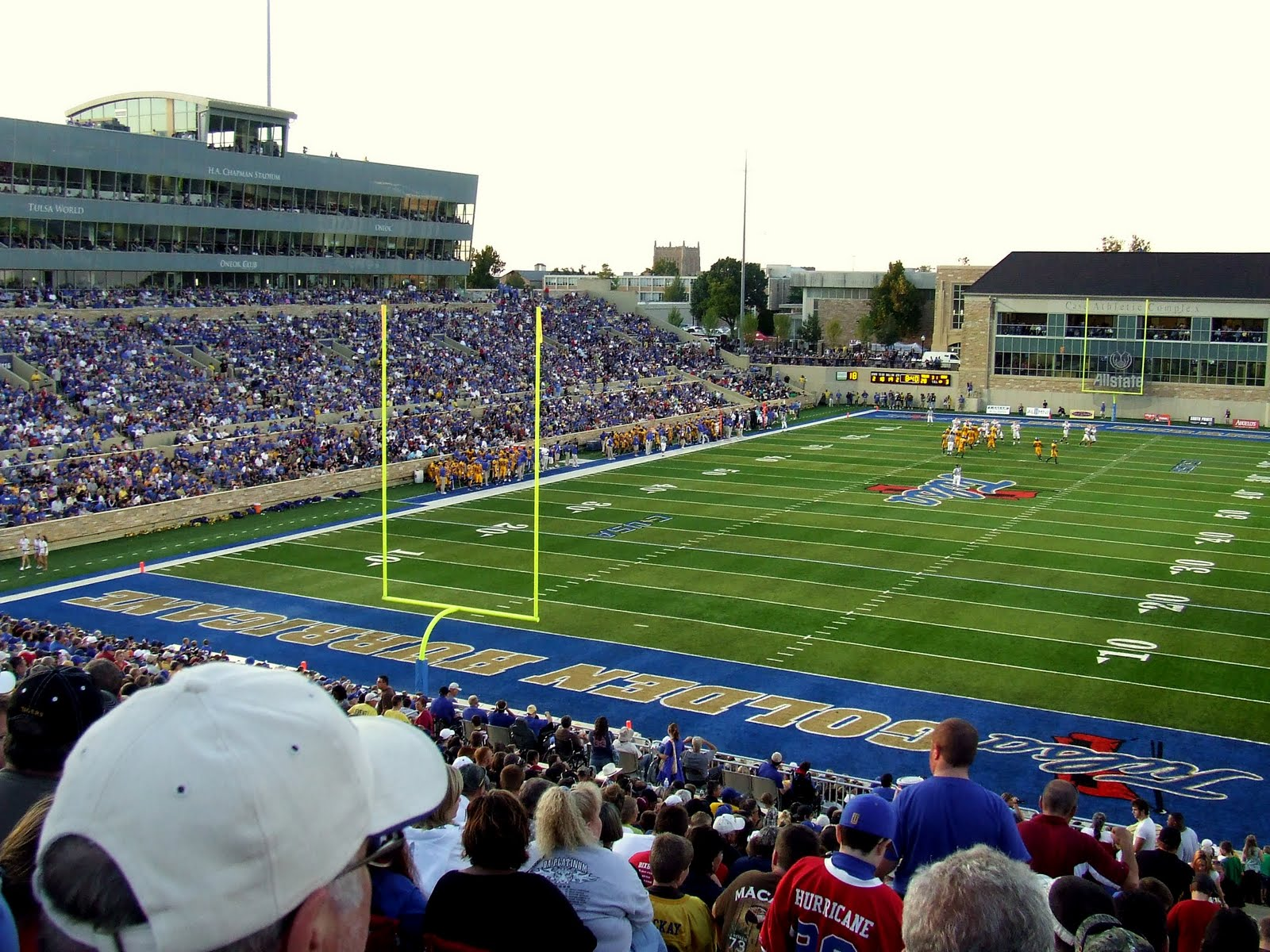
- Conference: Southland Conference
- Record: 5–6 (3–4 Southland)
- Head coach: Todd Whitten (5th season)
- Defensive coordinator: Scott Stoker (1st season)
- Home stadium: Bowers Stadium

2009 Southland Conference football standings
	Conf.			Overall
Team	W		L	W		L
No. 10 Stephen F. Austin +^	6	–	1	10	–	3
No. 12 McNeese State +^	6	–	1	9	–	2
No. 25 Texas State	5	–	2	7	–	4
Southeastern Louisiana	4	–	3	6	–	5
Sam Houston State	3	–	4	5	–	6
Central Arkansas	2	–	5	5	–	6
Nicholls State	2	–	5	3	–	9
Northwestern State	0	–	7	0	–	11
+ – Conference co-champions; ^ – FCS playoff participant; Rankings from The Sports Network poll

The 2009 Sam Houston State Bearkats football team represented Sam Houston State University as a member of the Southland Conference during the 2009 NCAA Division I FCS football season. Led by fifth-year head coach Todd Whitten, the Bearkats compiled an overall record of 5–6 with a mark of 3–4 in conference play, and finished fifth in the Southland.

== Schedule ==
Date	Opponent	Site	Result	Attendance	Source
September 3	Western Illinois*	Bowers Stadium; Huntsville, TX	L 28–35	6,035	
September 12	North Dakota State*	Bowers Stadium; Huntsville, TX	W 48–45	6,048	
September 26	at Tulsa*	H. A. Chapman Stadium; Tulsa, OK	L 3–56	26,048	
October 3	St. Joseph's (IN)*	Bowers Stadium; Huntsville, TX	W 41–0	4,041	
October 10	Nicholls State	Bowers Stadium; Huntsville, TX	W 44–21	11,144	
October 17	at Southeastern Louisiana	Strawberry Stadium; Hammond, LA	L 21–37	6,902	
October 24	at No. 15 Stephen F. Austin	Homer Bryce Stadium; Nacogdoches, TX (Battle of the Piney Woods)	L 3–42	18,546	
October 31	Northwestern State	Bowers Stadium; Huntsville, TX	W 34–30	2,134	
November 7	at No. 12 McNeese State	Cowboy Stadium; Lake Charles, LA	L 42–63	14,003	
November 14	Central Arkansas	Bowers Stadium; Huntsville, TX	W 17–14	2,817	
November 21	at Texas State	Bobcat Stadium; San Marcos, TX (rivalry)	L 20–28	9,118	
*Non-conference game; Rankings from The Sports Network Poll released prior to the game
