= 2009 McNeese State Cowboys football team =

American college football season

2009 McNeese State Cowboys football

Southland co-champion

NCAA Division I First Round, L 13–49 vs. New Hampshire
- Conference: Southland Conference

Ranking
- Sports Network: No. 12
- FCS Coaches: No. 12
- Record: 9–3 (6–1 Southland)
- Head coach: Matt Viator (4th season)
- Co-offensive coordinators: Broderick Fobbs (3rd season); Tim Leger (3rd season)
- Home stadium: Cowboy Stadium

2009 Southland Conference football standings
	Conf.			Overall
Team	W		L	W		L
No. 10 Stephen F. Austin +^	6	–	1	10	–	3
No. 12 McNeese State +^	6	–	1	9	–	2
No. 25 Texas State	5	–	2	7	–	4
Southeastern Louisiana	4	–	3	6	–	5
Sam Houston State	3	–	4	5	–	6
Central Arkansas	2	–	5	5	–	6
Nicholls State	2	–	5	3	–	9
Northwestern State	0	–	7	0	–	11
+ – Conference co-champions; ^ – FCS playoff participant; Rankings from The Sports Network poll

The 2009 McNeese State Cowboys football team represented McNeese State University as a member of the Southland Conference in the 2009 NCAA Division I FCS football season. The Cowboys were led by fourth-year head coach Matt Viator and played their home games at Cowboy Stadium. They finished the season with an overall record of 9–3 and a conference mark of 6–1, sharing the Southland title with Stephen F. Austin and losing in the first round of the FCS playoffs to New Hampshire, 49–13.

== Schedule ==
Date	Opponent	Rank	Site	TV	Result	Attendance	Source
September 5	Henderson State*	No. 15	Cowboy Stadium; Lake Charles, LA		W 27–24	12,225	
September 12	at No. 2 Appalachian State*	No. 16	Kidd Brewer Stadium; Boone, NC	FSN	W 40–35	27,914	
September 19	Savannah State*	No. 8	Cowboy Stadium; Lake Charles, LA		W 56–0	13,912	
September 26	at Tulane*	No. 8	Mercedes-Benz Superdome; New Orleans, LA		L 32–42	29,098	
October 10	at Stephen F. Austin	No. 7	Homer Bryce Stadium; Nacogdoches, TX		L 13–16	11,182	
October 17	Northwestern State	No. 13	Cowboy Stadium; Lake Charles, LA (rivalry)		W 51–23	16,132	
October 24	Southeastern Louisiana	No. 12	Cowboy Stadium; Lake Charles, LA		W 36–35	13,008	
October 31	at Nicholls State	No. 13	Manning Field at John L. Guidry Stadium; Thibodaux, LA		W 38–17	5,989	
November 7	Sam Houston State	No. 12	Cowboy Stadium; Lake Charles, LA		W 63–42	14,003	
November 14	at No. 25 Texas State	No. 10	Bobcat Stadium; San Marcos, TX	Suddenlink Cable	W 30–27	13,013	
November 21	Central Arkansas	No. 8	Cowboy Stadium; Lake Charles, LA (Red Beans and Rice Bowl)		W 21–17	11,335	
November 28	No. 10 New Hampshire	No. 8	Cowboy Stadium; Lake Charles, LA (NCAA Division I First Round)		L 13–49	10,009	
*Non-conference game; Rankings from The Sports Network Poll released prior to the game
