= Mike Lucas =

American football coach (born 1959)

Current position
- Title: Defensive coordinator & linebackers coach
- Team: Southwestern Oklahoma State
- Conference: GAC

Biographical details
- Born: March 7, 1959 (age 67); Mount Holly, New Jersey, U.S.
- Education: Liberty University, B.S. 1982

Playing career
- 1977–1978: William & Mary
- Position: Quarterback

Coaching career (HC unless noted)
- 1979: William & Mary (SA)
- 1980–1983: Liberty (DE)
- 1984: UTEP (WR)
- 1985–1986: Eastern New Mexico (DC)
- 1987–1989: Sam Houston State (AHC)
- 1990–2004: Sam Houston State (AHC/DC)
- 2005–2006: Southeastern Louisiana (DC)
- 2007–2011: Southeastern Louisiana
- 2013: Indiana State (DL)
- 2014: Northwestern State (DC/LB)
- 2015–2017: Louisiana–Lafayette (AHC/LB/RC)
- 2018–2021: Northwestern State (DC/LB)
- 2023: Northeastern State (DC/LB)
- 2024–present: Southwestern Oklahoma State (DC/LB)

Head coaching record
- Overall: 19–37

Michael Lucas (born March 7, 1959) is an American college football coach. He is the defensive coordinator and linebackers coach for Southwestern Oklahoma State University, positions he has held since 2024. From 2007 through the 2011 season he was the head football coach at Southeastern Louisiana University located in Hammond, Louisiana—the 14th football coach at the school. He was released from his duties as head coach at Southeastern Louisiana on November 21, 2011.

== Personal life ==
In November 2008, Lucas underwent surgery which successfully repaired a heart valve.

== Head coaching record ==
Year	Team	Overall	Conference	Standing	Bowl/playoffs
Southeastern Louisiana Lions (Southland Conference) (2007–2011)
2007	Southeastern Louisiana	3–8	2–5	7th	
2008	Southeastern Louisiana	5–7	2–5	T–6th	
2009	Southeastern Louisiana	6–5	4–3	4th	
2010	Southeastern Louisiana	2–9	1–6	T–7th	
2011	Southeastern Louisiana	3–8	1–6	7th	
Southeastern Louisiana:		19–37	10–25		
Total:		19–37			
