= 2009 Weber State Wildcats football team =

American college football season

2009 Weber State Wildcats football
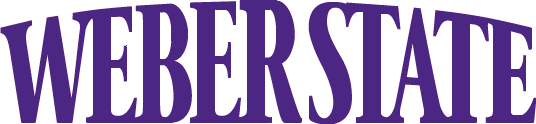

FCS Playoffs First Round, L 0–38 vs. William & Mary
- Conference: Big Sky Conference
- Record: 7–5 (6–2 Big Sky)
- Head coach: Ron McBride (5th season)
- Offensive coordinator: Matt Hammer (3rd season)
- Defensive coordinator: Colton Swan (2nd season)
- Home stadium: Stewart Stadium

2009 Big Sky Conference football standings
	Conf.			Overall
Team	W		L	W		L
No. 2 Montana $^	8	–	0	14	–	1
No. 13 Eastern Washington ^	6	–	2	8	–	4
No. 17 Weber State ^	6	–	2	7	–	5
Montana State	5	–	3	7	–	4
Northern Arizona	4	–	4	5	–	6
Sacramento State	4	–	4	5	–	6
Northern Colorado	1	–	7	3	–	8
Portland State	1	–	7	2	–	9
Idaho State	1	–	7	1	–	10
$ – Conference champion; ^ – FCS playoff participant; Rankings from The Sports Network poll

The 2009 Weber State Wildcats football team represented Weber State University for the 2009 season under head coach Ron McBride. The Wildcats finished the regular season with a record of 7–4 (6–2 Big Sky) and were invited to participate in the FCS Playoffs, where they fell in the first round to William & Mary by a final score of 0–38 to finish 7–5. The Wildcats played two FBS teams, and although they lost both games they lost each game by one touchdown (7 points) or less. Quarterback Cameron Higgins and wide receiver Tim Toone were both selected as FCS All-Americans (Toone on first team and Higgins on second team). 2009 also marked the first time in school history that Weber State qualified for the playoffs two consecutive years.

== Schedule ==
Date	Time	Opponent	Site	Result	Attendance
September 5	1:00 pm	at Wyoming*	War Memorial Stadium; Laramie, Wyoming	L 22–29	18,016
September 12	3:00 pm	at Colorado State*	Hughes Stadium; Fort Collins, Colorado	L 23–24	23,417
September 19	6:30 pm	Idaho State	Stewart Stadium; Ogden, Utah	W 44–17	8,467
September 26	1:05 pm	at Portland State	PGE Park; Portland, Oregon	W 36–29	6,659
October 3	1:30 pm	Montana State	Stewart Stadium; Ogden, Utah	L 21–26	6,112
October 10	12:30 pm	at Eastern Washington	Woodward Field; Cheney, Washington	W 31–13	5,370
October 17	1:35 pm	Sacramento State^{†}	Stewart Stadium; Ogden, Utah	W 49–10	8,218
October 24	1:35 pm	at Northern Colorado	Nottingham Field; Greeley, Colorado	W 28–20	2,852
October 31	1:05 pm	at Montana	Washington–Grizzly Stadium; Missoula, Montana	L 10–31	25,811
November 14	12:00 pm	Northern Arizona	Stewart Stadium; Ogden, Utah	W 27–9	4,321
November 21	12:00 pm	Cal Poly*	Stewart Stadium; Ogden, Utah	W 47–14	5,382
November 28	1:00 pm	at William & Mary*	Zable Stadium; Williamsburg, Virginia (FCS Playoffs First Round)	L 0–38	6,497
*Non-conference game; ^{†}Homecoming; All times are in Mountain time
