= 2009 Sacramento State Hornets football team =

American college football season

2009 Sacramento State Hornets football
- Conference: Big Sky Conference
- Record: 5–6 (4–4 Big Sky)
- Head coach: Marshall Sperbeck (3rd season)
- Home stadium: Hornet Stadium

2009 Big Sky Conference football standings
	Conf.			Overall
Team	W		L	W		L
No. 2 Montana $^	8	–	0	14	–	1
No. 13 Eastern Washington ^	6	–	2	8	–	4
No. 17 Weber State ^	6	–	2	7	–	5
Montana State	5	–	3	7	–	4
Northern Arizona	4	–	4	5	–	6
Sacramento State	4	–	4	5	–	6
Northern Colorado	1	–	7	3	–	8
Portland State	1	–	7	2	–	9
Idaho State	1	–	7	1	–	10
$ – Conference champion; ^ – FCS playoff participant; Rankings from The Sports Network poll

The 2009 Sacramento State Hornets football team represented California State University, Sacramento as a member of the Big Sky Conference during the 2009 NCAA Division I FCS football season. Led by third-year head coach Marshall Sperbeck, Sacramento State compiled an overall record of 5–6 with a mark of 4–4 in conference play, tying for fifth place in the Big Sky. The team was outscored by its opponents 371 to 274 for the season. The Hornets played home games at Hornet Stadium in Sacramento, California.

== Schedule ==
Date	Opponent	Site	Result	Attendance	Source
September 5	at UNLV*	Sam Boyd Stadium; Whitney, NV	L 3–38	22,195	
September 12	at No. 12 Cal Poly*	Alex G. Spanos Stadium; San Luis Obispo, CA	L 19–38	10,381	
September 26	No. 18 Eastern Washington	Hornet Stadium; Sacramento, CA	L 30–56	10,175	
October 3	at Portland State	PGE Park; Portland, OR	W 31–14	5,037	
October 10	Idaho State	Hornet Stadium; Sacramento, CA	W 38–17	9,883	
October 17	at No. 15 Weber State	Wildcat Stadium; Ogden, UT	L 10–49	8,218	
October 24	No. 2 Montana	Hornet Stadium; Sacramento, CA	L 30–45	7,629	
October 31	No. 21 Northern Arizona	Hornet Stadium; Sacramento, CA	W 27–24	4,862	
November 7	at Northern Colorado	Nottingham Field; Greeley, CO	W 38–35	2,464	
November 14	at Montana State	Bobcat Stadium; Bozeman, MT	L 17–27	10,697	
November 21	UC Davis*	Hornet Stadium; Sacramento, CA (Causeway Classic)	W 31–28	17,127	
*Non-conference game; Rankings from The Sports Network Poll released prior to the game
