= Maurice A. Baumgarten =

American football player and coach (1908–1976)

Biographical details
- Born: March 10, 1908; Schulenburg, Texas, U.S.
- Died: August 25, 1976 (aged 68); Houston, Texas, U.S.

Playing career

Football
- 1929–1931: Texas
- Position: Guard

Coaching career (HC unless noted)

Football
- 1941: Stephen F. Austin
- 1945–1947: Rice (assistant)

Baseball
- 1946–1948: Rice (assistant)

Head coaching record
- Overall: 1–6–1

Maurice Arnim "Dutch" Baumgarten Sr. (March 10, 1908 – August 25, 1976) was an American college football and baseball player and coach. He served as the head football coach at Stephen F. Austin University in Nacogdoches, Texas in 1941 and, later, as an assistant coach at Rice University in Houston from 1945 to 1947. During that time frame, he also served as an assistant baseball coach Rice.

== Playing career ==
Baumgarten was a three-time letter winner in football at the University of Texas at Austin from 1929 to 1931. In 1930 he helped the team win the Southwest Conference Championship and earned All-Conference honors at guard. In 1931 he was a team captain and again earned all-conference honors despite a knee injury.

He was also a three-time letter winner in baseball, and helped the Longhorns win conference championships in 1930 and 1932.

In 1932 he was awarded the Norris Athletic Trophy, which was an annual award given to the best Longhorn athlete during the late 1920’s to the middle 1930’s.

== Coaching career ==
After graduation, Baumgarten started coaching at the high school level coaching at Crane in 1933 and at Midland in the mid-1930's.

He served as the head football coach at Stephen F. Austin University in Nacogdoches, Texas in 1941 but had to play just freshmen and sophomores because the older players left to serve in World War II. At the end of the season college sports were curtailed and Baumgarten was called to serve in the United States Navy Reserve.

Baumgarten was an assistant football coach at Rice University in Houston from 1945 to 1947. During that time frame, he also served as an assistant baseball coach at Rice.

After coaching football and baseball at Rice, Baumgarten resigned in 1948 to go into private business.

== Later life ==
Baumgarten served as president of the Southwest Conference Football Association in the 1950's and worked as a Southwest Conference linesman, including at the Gator Bowl in 1960.

Baumgarten's son, Sonny, also played football at Texas as an end on the 1956 and 1957 teams.

Baumgarten died from cancer, on August 25, 1976, in Houston. He was buried in Schulenburg City Cemetery in Schulenburg, Texas, where he was born.

== Head coaching record ==
Year	Team	Overall	Conference	Standing	Bowl/playoffs
Stephen F. Austin Lumberjacks (Lone Star Conference) (1941)
1941	Stephen F. Austin	1–6–1	0–4	5th	
Stephen F. Austin:		1–6–1	0–4		
Total:		1–6–1			
