= 2009 Idaho State Bengals football team =

American college football season

2009 Idaho State Bengals football
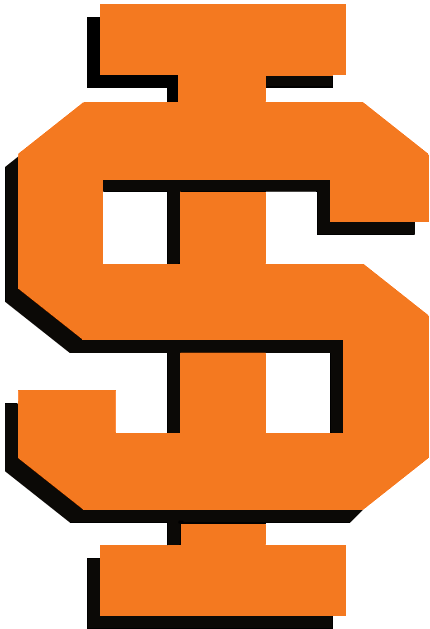
- Conference: Big Sky Conference
- Record: 1–10 (1–7 Big Sky)
- Head coach: John Zamberlin (3rd season)
- Offensive coordinator: Brian Jensen (1st season)
- Offensive scheme: Pro spread
- Defensive coordinator: Brian Strandley (3rd season)
- Base defense: 3–4
- Home stadium: Holt Arena

2009 Big Sky Conference football standings
	Conf.			Overall
Team	W		L	W		L
No. 2 Montana $^	8	–	0	14	–	1
No. 13 Eastern Washington ^	6	–	2	8	–	4
No. 17 Weber State ^	6	–	2	7	–	5
Montana State	5	–	3	7	–	4
Northern Arizona	4	–	4	5	–	6
Sacramento State	4	–	4	5	–	6
Northern Colorado	1	–	7	3	–	8
Portland State	1	–	7	2	–	9
Idaho State	1	–	7	1	–	10
$ – Conference champion; ^ – FCS playoff participant; Rankings from The Sports Network poll

The 2009 Idaho State Bengals football team represented Idaho State University as a member of the Big Sky Conference during the 2009 NCAA Division I FCS football season. Led by third-year head coach John Zamberlin, the Bengals compiled an overall record of 1–10 with a mark of 1–7 in conference play, placing last in the Big Sky. Idaho State played home games at Holt Arena in Pocatello, Idaho.

== Schedule ==
Date	Time	Opponent	Site	TV	Result	Attendance	Source
September 5	8:00 pm	at Arizona State*	Sun Devil Stadium; Tempe, AZ	FSAZ	L 3–50	42,588	
September 12	5:00 pm	at No. 13 (FBS) Oklahoma*	Gaylord Family Oklahoma Memorial Stadium; Norman, OK	FSN PPV	L 0–64	84,749	
September 19	6:05 pm	at Weber State	Stewart Stadium; Ogden, UT		L 17–44	8,467	
September 26	3:35 pm	Central Washington*	Holt Arena; Pocatello, ID		L 22–33		
October 3	3:35 pm	No. 15 Eastern Washington	Holt Arena; Pocatello, ID		L 3–38	6,003	
October 10	3:05 pm	at Sacramento State	Hornet Stadium; Sacramento, CA		L 17–38	9,883	
October 17	3:35 pm	Northern Colorado	Holt Arena; Pocatello, ID		L 7–30		
October 24	4:05 pm	at Northern Arizona	Walkup Skydome; Flagstaff, AZ		L 12–40		
October 31	1:35 pm	at Montana State	Bobcat Stadium; Bozeman, MT		L 10–41		
November 7	3:35 pm	No. 2 Montana	Holt Arena; Pocatello, ID	KPAX	L 10–12	6,461	
November 14	3:35 pm	Portland State	Holt Arena; Pocatello, ID		W 41–34	5,019	
*Non-conference game; Rankings from The Sports Network Poll released prior to the game; All times are in Mountain time
