= 2009 Southern Illinois Salukis football team =

American college football season

2009 Southern Illinois Salukis football

MVFC champion

NCAA Division I Quarterfinal, L 3–24 vs. William & Mary
- Conference: Missouri Valley Football Conference

Ranking
- Sports Network: No. 6
- Record: 11–2 (8–0 MVFC)
- Head coach: Dale Lennon (2nd season)
- Offensive coordinator: Phil Longo (2nd season)
- Defensive coordinator: Bubba Schweigert (2nd season)
- Home stadium: McAndrew Stadium

2009 Missouri Valley Football Conference standings
	Conf.			Overall
Team	W		L	W		L
No. 6 Southern Illinois $^	8	–	0	11	–	2
No. 11 South Dakota State ^	7	–	1	8	–	3
No. 18 Northern Iowa	5	–	3	7	–	4
Illinois State	5	–	3	6	–	5
Missouri State	4	–	4	6	–	5
Youngstown State	4	–	4	6	–	5
North Dakota State	2	–	6	3	–	8
Indiana State	1	–	7	1	–	10
Western Illinois	0	–	8	1	–	10
$ – Conference champion; ^ – FCS playoff participant; Rankings from The Sports Network poll

The 2009 Southern Illinois Salukis football team represented Southern Illinois University as a member of the Missouri Valley Football Conference (MVFC) during the 2009 NCAA Division I FCS football season. They were led by second-year head coach Dale Lennon and played their home games at McAndrew Stadium. The Salukis finished the season with an 11–2 record overall and an 8–0 mark in conference play, winning the MVFC title. The team received an automatic bid to the FCS playoffs, where they defeated Eastern Illinois in the first round before losing to William & Mary in the quarterfinals. The team was ranked No. 6 in The Sports Network's postseason ranking of FCS teams.

== Schedule ==
Date	Opponent	Rank	Site	Result	Attendance	Source
September 5	at Marshall*	No. 7	Joan C. Edwards Stadium; Huntington, WV	L 28–31	24,012	
September 19	Southwest Baptist*	No. 9	McAndrew Stadium; Carbondale, IL	W 59–7	8,358	
September 26	North Dakota State	No. 9	McAndrew Stadium; Carbondale, IL	W 24–14	8,768	
October 3	at Western Illinois	No. 8	Hanson Field; Macomb, IL	W 30–10	13,459	
October 10	Illinois State^{†}	No. 6	McAndrew Stadium; Carbondale, IL	W 43–23	11,153	
October 17	at No. 2 Northern Iowa	No. 5	UNI-Dome; Cedar Falls, IA	W 27–20	17,190	
October 24	Youngstown State	No. 3	McAndrew Stadium; Carbondale, IL	W 27–8	10,129	
October 31	at Indiana State	No. 3	Memorial Stadium; Terre Haute, IN	W 33–0	4,582	
November 7	at No. 9 South Dakota State	No. 3	Coughlin–Alumni Stadium; Brookings, SD	W 34–15	10,317	
November 14	Missouri State	No. 1	McAndrew Stadium; Carbondale, IL	W 44–24	11,516	
November 21	at Southeast Missouri State	No. 1	Houck Stadium; Cape Girardeau, MO	W 42–24	7,527	
November 28	No. 19 Eastern Illinois*	No. 1	McAndrew Stadium; Carbondale, IL (NCAA Division I First Round)	W 48–7	6,391	
December 5	No. 6 William & Mary*	No. 1	McAndrew Stadium; Carbondale, IL (NCAA Division I Quarterfinal)	L 3–24	5,860	
*Non-conference game; ^{†}Homecoming; Rankings from The Sports Network Poll released prior to the game
