= 2009 Northern Iowa Panthers football team =

American college football season

2009 Northern Iowa Panthers football
- Conference: Missouri Valley Football Conference

Ranking
- Sports Network: No. 18
- FCS Coaches: No. 18
- Record: 7–4 (5–3 MVFC)
- Head coach: Mark Farley (9th season)
- Co-offensive coordinators: Bill Salmon (9th season); Mario Verduzco (4th season)
- Defensive coordinator: Chris Klieman (2nd season)
- Home stadium: UNI-Dome

2009 Missouri Valley Football Conference standings
	Conf.			Overall
Team	W		L	W		L
No. 6 Southern Illinois $^	8	–	0	11	–	2
No. 11 South Dakota State ^	7	–	1	8	–	3
No. 18 Northern Iowa	5	–	3	7	–	4
Illinois State	5	–	3	6	–	5
Missouri State	4	–	4	6	–	5
Youngstown State	4	–	4	6	–	5
North Dakota State	2	–	6	3	–	8
Indiana State	1	–	7	1	–	10
Western Illinois	0	–	8	1	–	10
$ – Conference champion; ^ – FCS playoff participant; Rankings from The Sports Network poll

The 2009 Northern Iowa Panthers football team represented the University of Northern Iowa as a member of the Missouri Valley Football Conference (MVFC) during the 2009 NCAA Division I FCS football season. Led by ninth-year head coach Mark Farley, the Panthers compiled an overall record of 7–4 with a mark of 5–3 in conference play, tying for third place in the MVFC. The team played home games at the UNI-Dome in Cedar Falls, Iowa.

== Schedule ==
Date	Time	Opponent	Rank	Site	TV	Result	Attendance	Source
September 5	11:05 am	at Iowa*	No. 4	Kinnick Stadium; Iowa City, IA	BTN	L 16–17	70,585	
September 12	4:05 pm	South Dakota*	No. 4	UNI-Dome; Cedar Falls, IA	KWWL	W 66–7	12,688	
September 19	4:05 pm	Saint Francis (PA)*	No. 3	UNI-Dome; Cedar Falls, IA		W 30–0	10,981	
September 26	1:00 pm	at Missouri State	No. 3	Plaster Sports Complex; Springfield, MO	KWWL 7.3	W 35–7	15,038	
October 3	4:05 pm	Indiana State	No. 3	UNI-Dome; Cedar Falls, IA		W 62–7	14,860	
October 10	6:00 pm	at North Dakota State	No. 3	Fargodome; Fargo, ND	KWWL 7.3	W 42–27	16,418	
October 17	4:05 pm	Southern Illinois	No. 2	UNI-Dome; Cedar Falls, IA	CFU, Mediacom	L 20–27	17,190	
October 24	2:00 pm	at No. 11 South Dakota State	No. 6	Coughlin-Alumni Stadium; Brookings, SD	Mediacom/Midcontinent	L 14–24	15,523	
November 7	4:05 pm	Youngstown State	No. 11	UNI-Dome; Cedar Falls, IA		W 28–7	11,025	
November 14	4:05 pm	Western Illinois	No. 11	UNI-Dome; Cedar Falls, IA		W 34–0	11,070	
November 21	1:00 pm	at Illinois State	No. 9	Hancock Stadium; Normal, IL	Mediacom	L 20–22	6,287	
*Non-conference game; Rankings from The Sports Network Poll released prior to the game; All times are in Central time

== Rankings ==
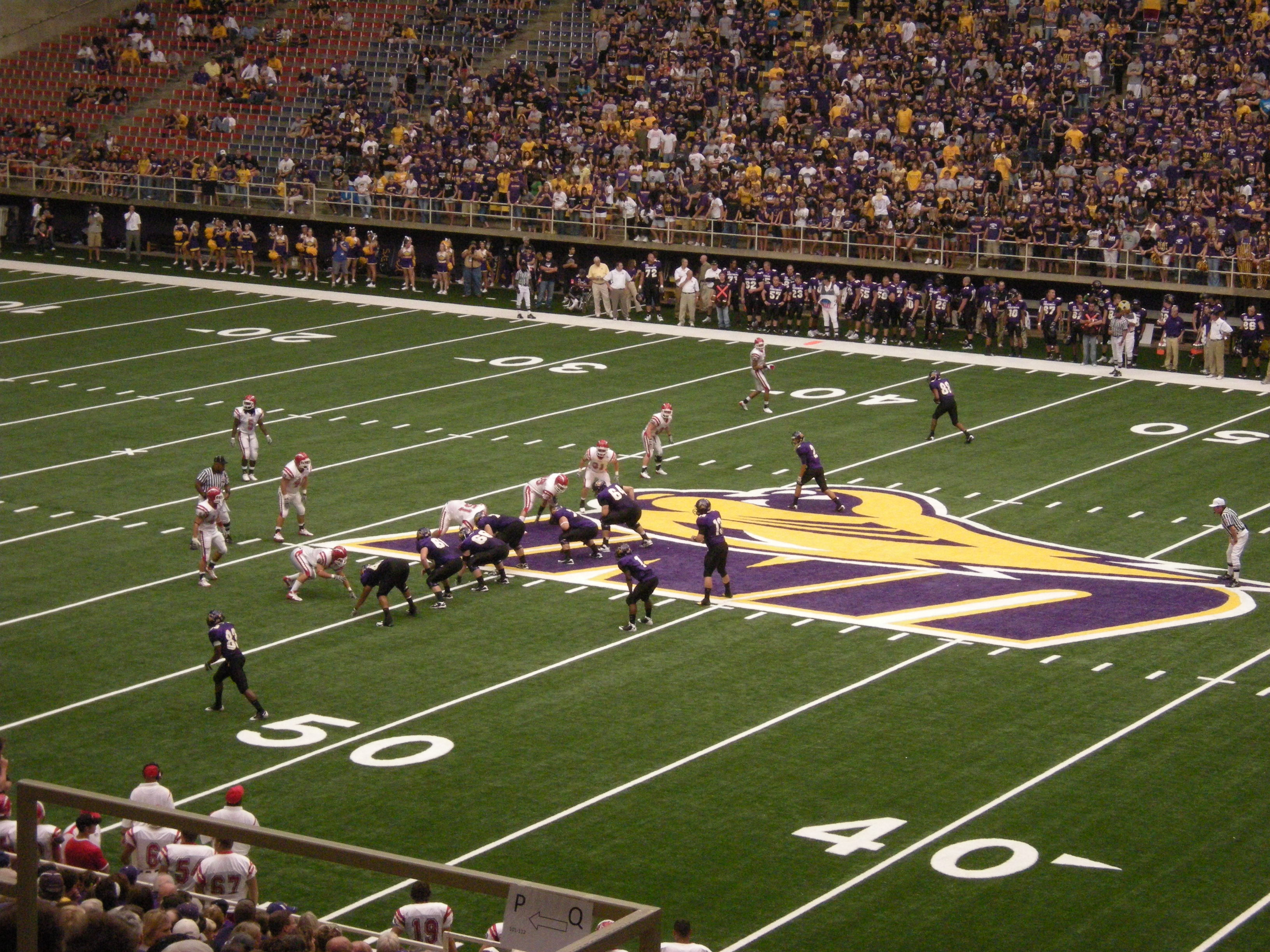
UNI's offense against Saint Francis on September 19

Ranking movements Legend: ██ Increase in ranking ██ Decrease in ranking
	Week													
Poll	Pre	1	2	3	4	5	6	7	8	9	10	11	12	Final
The Sports Network	4	4	3	3	3	3	2	5	12	11	11	9	16	18
FCS Coaches	4	5	4	4	4	4	3	6	14	12	11	11	15	18

== Personnel ==
=== Coaching staff ===
Name	Position	Year at Northern Iowa	Alma mater (year)
Mark Farley	Head coach	9th	Northern Iowa (1987)
Rick Nelson	Recruiting coordinator Offensive line	10th	Northern Iowa (1984)
Bill Salmon	Associate head coach Offensive coordinator Receivers	9th	Northern Iowa (1980)
Mario Verduzco	Co-offensive coordinator Quarterbacks	9th	San José State (1988)
Atif Austin	Running backs Special teams coordinator	5th	Iowa State (2003)
Chris Klieman	Defensive coordinator Secondary	4th	Northern Iowa (1990)
Erik Chinander	Recruiting coordinator Tight ends	6th	Iowa (2003)
Jeremiah Johnson	Recruiting coordinator/Asst. Defensive Coach	3rd	Kansas (2000)
Jovan Dewitt	Linebackers	1st	Northern Michigan (1999)
Derek Moore	Defensive assistant	1st	Buena Vista (2000)
Bill Wilt	Defensive line	2nd	Eureka College (1977)

== Awards and honors ==
Defensive end Jason Ruffin was selected to the East–West Shrine Bowl.
