= 2009 Western Illinois Leathernecks football team =

American college football season

2009 Western Illinois Leathernecks football
- Conference: Missouri Valley Football Conference
- Record: 1–10 (0–8 MVFC)
- Head coach: Don Patterson (10th season; first 3 games); Mark Hendrickson (interim, final 8 games)
- Defensive coordinator: Thomas Casey (5th season)
- Home stadium: Hanson Field

2009 Missouri Valley Football Conference standings
	Conf.			Overall
Team	W		L	W		L
No. 6 Southern Illinois $^	8	–	0	11	–	2
No. 11 South Dakota State ^	7	–	1	8	–	3
No. 18 Northern Iowa	5	–	3	7	–	4
Illinois State	5	–	3	6	–	5
Missouri State	4	–	4	6	–	5
Youngstown State	4	–	4	6	–	5
North Dakota State	2	–	6	3	–	8
Indiana State	1	–	7	1	–	10
Western Illinois	0	–	8	1	–	10
$ – Conference champion; ^ – FCS playoff participant; Rankings from The Sports Network poll

The 2009 Western Illinois Leathernecks football team represented Western Illinois University as a member of the in Missouri Valley Football Conference (MVFC) during the 2009 NCAA Division I FCS football season. The team was led by head coaches Mark Hendrickson and Don Patterson, who left the team late in the 2008 season due to health problems. The 2009 season was Patterson's last with Western Illinois. He coached the first three games before stepping down, ceding the head coaching duties to Hendrickson. Western Illinois compiling an overall record of 1–10 with a mark of 0–8 in conference play, placing last out of nine teams in the MVFC. The team played home games at Hanson Field in Macomb, Illinois.

== Schedule ==
Date	Opponent	Site	Result	Attendance	Source
September 3	at Sam Houston State*	Bowers Stadium; Huntsville, TX	W 35–28	6,035	
September 12	at Northern Illinois*	Huskie Stadium; DeKalb, IL	L 7–41	21,427	
September 19	Stephen F. Austin*	Hanson Field; Macomb, IL	L 30–40	15,328	
October 3	No. 8 Southern Illinois	Hanson Field; Macomb, IL	L 10–30	13,459	
October 10	at Youngstown State	Stambaugh Stadium; Youngstown, OH	L 21–31		
October 17	Missouri State	Hanson Field; Macomb, IL	L 16–17		
October 24	at Indiana State	Memorial Stadium; Terre Haute, IN	L 14–17		
October 31	North Dakota State	Hanson Field; Macomb, IL	L 7–14	5,489	
November 7	at Illinois State	Hancock Stadium; Normal, IL	L 7–25	12,074	
November 14	at No. 11 Northern Iowa	UNI-Dome; Cedar Falls, IA	L 0–34	11,070	
November 21	No. 12 South Dakota State	Hanson Field; Macomb, IL	L 7–27	1,508	
*Non-conference game; Rankings from The Sports Network Poll released prior to the game
