= 2009 Stephen F. Austin Lumberjacks football team =

American college football season

2009 Stephen F. Austin Lumberjacks football

Southland champion

NCAA Division I Quarterfinal, L 0–51 vs. Montana
- Conference: Southland Conference

Ranking
- Sports Network: No. 10
- FCS Coaches: No. 9
- Record: 10–3 (6–1 Southland)
- Head coach: J. C. Harper (3rd season)
- Offensive coordinator: Shannon Dawson (2nd season)
- Defensive coordinator: David Gibbs (2nd season)
- Home stadium: Homer Bryce Stadium

2009 Southland Conference football standings
	Conf.			Overall
Team	W		L	W		L
No. 10 Stephen F. Austin +^	6	–	1	10	–	3
No. 12 McNeese State +^	6	–	1	9	–	2
No. 25 Texas State	5	–	2	7	–	4
Southeastern Louisiana	4	–	3	6	–	5
Sam Houston State	3	–	4	5	–	6
Central Arkansas	2	–	5	5	–	6
Nicholls State	2	–	5	3	–	9
Northwestern State	0	–	7	0	–	11
+ – Conference co-champions; ^ – FCS playoff participant; Rankings from The Sports Network poll

The 2009 Stephen F. Austin Lumberjacks football team represented Stephen F. Austin State University in the 2009 NCAA Division I FCS football season. The team was led by third-year head coach J. C. Harper and played its home games at Homer Bryce Stadium. It finished the regular season with a 10–3 record overall and a 6–1 record in the Southland Conference, making the team conference champions. The team qualified for the playoffs, in which it was eliminated in the quarterfinals by Montana.

== Schedule ==
Date	Time	Opponent	Rank	Site	TV	Result	Attendance	Source
September 5	7:00 p.m.	at SMU*		Gerald J. Ford Stadium; University Park, TX		L 23–31	34,749	
September 12	6:00 p.m.	Texas College*		Homer Bryce Stadium; Nacogdoches, TX		W 92–0	8,346	
September 19	6:05 p.m.	at Western Illinois*		Hanson Field; Macomb, IL		W 40–30	15,328	
September 26	6:00 p.m.	North Dakota*		Homer Bryce Stadium; Nacogdoches, TX		W 65–31	10,152	
October 10	6:00 p.m.	No. 7 McNeese State		Homer Bryce Stadium; Nacogdoches, TX		W 16–13	11,182	
October 17	6:00 p.m.	at No. 8 Central Arkansas	No. 20	Estes Stadium; Conway, AR		W 33–30	7,527	
October 24	2:00 p.m.	Sam Houston State	No. 15	Homer Bryce Stadium; Nacogdoches, TX (Battle of the Piney Woods)		W 42–3	18,546	
October 31	2:00 p.m.	at Texas State	No. 11	Bobcat Stadium; San Marcos, TX		L 7–28	13,926	
November 7	6:00 p.m.	Nicholls State	No. 15	Homer Bryce Stadium; Nacogdoches, TX		W 31–27	10,214	
November 14	2:00 p.m.	at Southeastern Louisiana	No. 15	Strawberry Stadium; Hammond, LA		W 41–10	6,877	
November 21	2:00 p.m.	at Northwestern State	No. 15	Harry Turpin Stadium; Natchitoches, LA (Chief Caddo)		W 19–10	3,488	
November 28	2:00 p.m.	No. 14 Eastern Washington*	No. 12	Homer Bryce Stadium; Nacogdoches, TX (NCAA Division I First Round)	CBSCS	W 44–33	8,224	
December 5	1:00 p.m.	at No. 1 Montana*	No. 12	Washington–Grizzly Stadium; Missoula, MT (NCAA Division I Quarterfinal)		L 0–51	22,438	
*Non-conference game; Rankings from The Sports Network Poll released prior to the game; All times are in Central time
