= 2009 Missouri State Bears football team =

American college football season

2009 Missouri State Bears football
- Conference: Missouri Valley Football Conference
- Record: 6–5 (4–4 MVFC)
- Head coach: Terry Allen (4th season)
- Offensive coordinator: Rob Christophel (4th season)
- Defensive coordinator: D. J. Vokolek (4th season)
- Captains: Cedric Alvis; David Arkin; Clay Harbor; Cody Kirby; Skylar Smith
- Home stadium: Plaster Sports Complex

2009 Missouri Valley Football Conference standings
	Conf.			Overall
Team	W		L	W		L
No. 6 Southern Illinois $^	8	–	0	11	–	2
No. 11 South Dakota State ^	7	–	1	8	–	3
No. 18 Northern Iowa	5	–	3	7	–	4
Illinois State	5	–	3	6	–	5
Missouri State	4	–	4	6	–	5
Youngstown State	4	–	4	6	–	5
North Dakota State	2	–	6	3	–	8
Indiana State	1	–	7	1	–	10
Western Illinois	0	–	8	1	–	10
$ – Conference champion; ^ – FCS playoff participant; Rankings from The Sports Network poll

The 2009 Missouri State Bears football team represented Missouri State University as a member of the Missouri Valley Football Conference (MVFC) during the 2009 NCAA Division I FCS football season. Led by fourth-year head coach Terry Allen, the Bears compiled an overall record of 6–5, with a mark of 4–4 in conference play, and finished tied for fifth in the MVFC.

== Schedule ==
Date	Opponent	Site	Result	Attendance	Source
September 5	at Arkansas*	War Memorial Stadium; Little Rock, AR	L 10–48	55,572	
September 12	UT Martin*	Plaster Sports Complex; Springfield, MO	W 24–14	9,357	
September 19	Murray State*	Plaster Sports Complex; Springfield, MO	W 35–10	5,530	
September 26	No. 3 Northern Iowa	Plaster Sports Complex; Springfield, MO	L 7–35	15,038	
October 3	at Youngstown State	Stambaugh Stadium; Youngstown, OH	W 17–7	16,727	
October 10	No. 19 South Dakota State	Plaster Sports Complex; Springfield, MO	L 17–24	10,592	
October 17	at Western Illinois	Hanson Field; Macomb, IL	W 17–16		
October 24	at North Dakota State	Fargodome; Fargo, ND (Harvest Bowl)	W 21–17	15,122	
October 31	Illinois State	Plaster Sports Complex; Springfield, MO	L 14–24	12,115	
November 7	Indiana State	Plaster Sports Complex; Springfield, MO	W 31–7	4,785	
November 14	at No. 1 Southern Illinois	McAndrew Stadium; Carbondale, IL	L 24–44	11,516	
*Non-conference game; Rankings from The Sports Network Poll released prior to the game
