= 2009 North Dakota State Bison football team =

American college football season

2009 North Dakota State Bison football
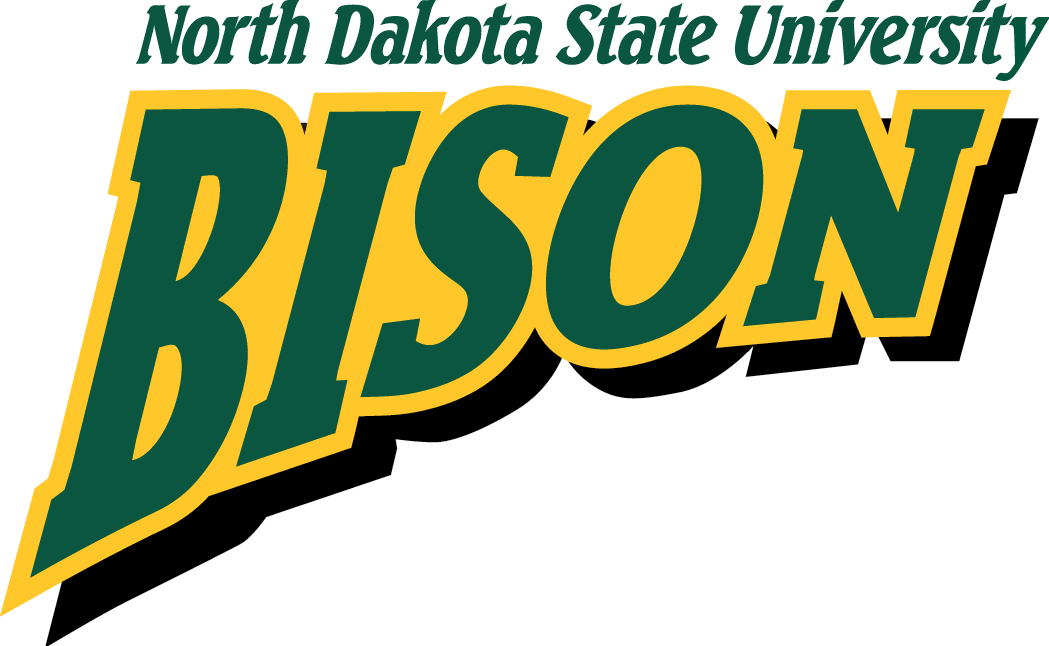
- Conference: Missouri Valley Football Conference
- Record: 3–8 (2–6 MVFC)
- Head coach: Craig Bohl (7th season)
- Offensive coordinator: Brent Vigen (1st season)
- Offensive scheme: Pro-style
- Base defense: 4–3
- Home stadium: Fargodome

2009 Missouri Valley Football Conference standings
	Conf.			Overall
Team	W		L	W		L
No. 6 Southern Illinois $^	8	–	0	11	–	2
No. 11 South Dakota State ^	7	–	1	8	–	3
No. 18 Northern Iowa	5	–	3	7	–	4
Illinois State	5	–	3	6	–	5
Missouri State	4	–	4	6	–	5
Youngstown State	4	–	4	6	–	5
North Dakota State	2	–	6	3	–	8
Indiana State	1	–	7	1	–	10
Western Illinois	0	–	8	1	–	10
$ – Conference champion; ^ – FCS playoff participant; Rankings from The Sports Network poll

The 2009 North Dakota State Bison football team represented North Dakota State University in the 2009 NCAA Division I FCS football season. The Bison were led by seventh-year head coach Craig Bohl and played their home games at the Fargodome. They were a member of the Missouri Valley Football Conference (MVC). Their record on the season was 3–8 overall and 2–6 in MVFC play to finish in seventh place. This season was only the third since 1964 that North Dakota State has a losing record. The Bison were not ranked all year and did not participate in the playoffs.

== Schedule ==
Date	Time	Opponent	Site	Result	Attendance	Source
September 3	7:10 pm	at Iowa State*	Jack Trice Stadium; Ames, IA	L 17–34	48,831	
September 12	6:00 pm	at Sam Houston State	Bowers Stadium; Huntsville, TX	L 45–48	6,048	
September 19	6:00 pm	Wagner*	Fargodome; Fargo, ND (Trees Bowl)	W 59–28	18,128	
September 26	6:00 pm	No. 9 Southern Illinois	McAndrew Stadium; Carbondale, IL	L 14–24	8,768	
October 3	1:10 pm	Illinois State^{†}	Fargodome; Fargo, ND	L 24–27	18,608	
October 10	3:10 pm	No. 3 Northern Iowa	Fargodome; Fargo, ND	L 27–42	16,418	
October 17	6:10 pm	at No. 14 South Dakota State	Coughlin-Alumni Stadium; Brookings, SD (Dakota Marker)	L 13–28	14,188	
October 24	6:00 pm	Missouri State	Fargodome; Fargo, ND (Harvest Bowl)	L 17–21	15,122	
October 31	1:05 pm	Western Illinois	Hanson Field; Macomb, IL	W 14–7	5,489	
November 14	12:00 pm	Indiana State	Memorial Stadium; Terre Haute, IN	W 56–17	2,878	
November 21	1:10 pm	Youngstown State	Fargodome; Fargo, ND	L 35–39	14,301	
*Non-conference game; ^{†}Homecoming; Rankings from The Sports Network Poll released prior to the game; All times are in Central time
