= Jeff Sperbeck =

American sports agent (1963–2025)

Jeff Sperbeck (April 17, 1963 – April 30, 2025) was an American NFL certified contract advisor who represented over 100 NFL football players in his 30-year career as a football agent. After serving as the Director of Octagon's football division from 2001 to 2009, he left and created The Novo Agency, in 2010.

== Early years ==
In 1988, Sperbeck began working for Pro Asset Management, where he started a career in the sports marketing and management field.

In 1989, Sperbeck moved to San Francisco and created his own sports marketing and events company.

In 1991, Sperbeck partnered with Hall of Fame San Francisco 49ers Ronnie Lott and 49ers running back Roger Craig to form CLS Sports, Inc. Jeff Sperbeck then became the manager for all of John Elway's and Ronnie Lott's marketing and business activities.

== Sullivan & Sperbeck ==
In 1994, Sperbeck partnered with Mike Sullivan to form Sullivan & Sperbeck in Northern California. When Sullivan & Sperbeck combined their skills, they had over 30 years in NFL player management and marketing. Their agency's roster included over two dozen NFL players and coaches, including Trent Dilfer, Damon Huard, Johnnie Morton, Eric Turner, William Floyd, Joey Porter, John Elway, Jim Plunkett, Ronnie Lott, Mike Bellotti, and Sonny Lubick.

== Octagon Football ==
In 2001, global sports marketing company Octagon Football acquired Sullivan & Sperbeck. Octagon created its football division around Sullivan & Sperbeck's existing infrastructure in Northern California. Jeff Sperbeck served as the Director of Octagon football. He, alongside Mike Sullivan, led the growth of the division to over 80 active NFL players.

== The Novo Agency ==
Sperbeck left Octagon in late 2009 and started The Novo Agency. Currently, The Novo Agency's roster includes Hall of Famers; John Elway, Ronnie Lott, Jim Plunkett, ACTIVE PLAYERS; Danny Shelton, Brandin Cooks, Billy Winn, Kenny Bell, Thomas Sperbeck, John Boyett, COACHES - Chris Strausser (Indianapolis Colts), Frank Pollack (Cincinnati Bengals), Greg Knapp (New York Jets), Joe Lombardi (Los Angeles Chargers) as well as retired players Joey Porter, Clark Haggans, Dennis Dixon, Ed Tu'amu, Chris Fuamatu Ma'afala, Christian & Fenuki Tupou, Daryn Colledge, Ramses Barden, Joel Dreessen, LaMichael James, and Mike Brisiel.

== Rep1 Football ==
The Novo Agency merged with Rep1 Sports in 2018 and Sperbeck continued to represent current coaches, retired players, and select active players.

== 7Cellars Wine & Spirits ==
In 2015, Sperbeck founded 7Cellars with long-time friend John Elway. The company produces premium and ultra-premium wines from the Central Coast of California as well as the Napa Valley under the respective names; The Farm Collection and Elway's Reserve.

== Personal life and death ==
Sperbeck was married to his wife, Cori Sperbeck, and had three children. His brother, Marshall, was the head football coach at Sacramento State from 2007 to 2013. On April 26, 2025, Sperbeck was riding in the back of a golf cart driven by John Elway at The Madison Club in La Quinta, California, when he fell off and struck his head. He was taken to a hospital in Palm Springs, where he remained on life support before dying on April 30, at the age of 62.
