= 2009 Central Arkansas Bears football team =

American college football season

2009 Central Arkansas Bears football
- Conference: Southland Conference
- Record: 5–6 (2–5 Southland)
- Head coach: Clint Conque (10th season)
- Offensive coordinator: Brooks Hollingsworth (6th season)
- Home stadium: Estes Stadium

2009 Southland Conference football standings
	Conf.			Overall
Team	W		L	W		L
No. 10 Stephen F. Austin +^	6	–	1	10	–	3
No. 12 McNeese State +^	6	–	1	9	–	2
No. 25 Texas State	5	–	2	7	–	4
Southeastern Louisiana	4	–	3	6	–	5
Sam Houston State	3	–	4	5	–	6
Central Arkansas	2	–	5	5	–	6
Nicholls State	2	–	5	3	–	9
Northwestern State	0	–	7	0	–	11
+ – Conference co-champions; ^ – FCS playoff participant; Rankings from The Sports Network poll

The 2009 Central Arkansas Bears football team represented the University of Central Arkansas as a member of the Southland Conference during the 2009 NCAA Division I FCS football season. Led by 10th-year head coach Clint Conque, the Bears compiled an overall record of 5–6 with a mark of 2–5 in conference play, and finished tied for sixth in the Southland.

== Schedule ==
Date	Time	Opponent	Rank	Site	TV	Result	Attendance	Source
September 4	12:05 am	at Hawaii*	No. 13	Aloha Stadium; Halawa, HI	Oceanic PPV, KFVE (delayed)	L 20–25	35,751	
September 19	6:00 pm	at Western Kentucky*	No. 13	Houchens Industries–L. T. Smith Stadium; Bowling Green, KY		W 28–7	17,295	
September 26	6:00 pm	Glenville State*	No. 12	Estes Stadium; Conway, AR		W 24–10	10,312	
October 3	6:00 pm	Missouri S&T*	No. 13	Estes Stadium; Conway, AR		W 45–10	10,443	
October 10	7:00 pm	at Northwestern State	No. 9	Harry Turpin Stadium; Natchitoches, LA		W 34–0	4,829	
October 17	6:00 pm	No. 20 Stephen F. Austin	No. 8	Estes Stadium; Conway, AR		L 30–33	7,527	
October 24	6:00 pm	Nicholls State	No. 18	Estes Stadium; Conway, AR		W 42–13	10,653	
October 31	2:00 pm	at Southeastern Louisiana	No. 12	Strawberry Stadium; Hammond, LA		L 21–25	4,261	
November 7	6:00 pm	Texas State	No. 20	Estes Stadium; Conway, AR		L 24–27	8,249	
November 14	2:00 pm	at Sam Houston State		Bowers Stadium; Huntsville, TX		L 14–17	2,817	
November 21	6:00 pm	at No. 8 McNeese State		Cowboy Stadium; Lake Charles, LA (Red Beans and Rice Bowl)		L 17–21	11,335	
November 28	1:00 pm	North Dakota*		Estes Stadium; Conway, AR		L 16–17	4,239	
*Non-conference game; Rankings from The Sports Network Poll released prior to the game; All times are in Central time
