= NorCal Conference =

Junior college athletic conference in Northern California

The NorCal Conference was a football conference for California Community College Athletic Association (CCCAA) teams located in Northern California.

The first iteration of the conference was known as the NorCal Football League and existed from 1990 to 1993 and disbanded after the 1993–94 school year. The conference was reformed in 1995 as the NorCal Football Conference.

== Champions ==
Year	Champion	Reference
1995	Sacramento City (Golden); Los Medanos (Bay)	
1996	Sacramento City (2) (Golden); College of the Redwoods (Bay)	
1997	Butte	
1998	Sacramento City (3)	
1999	Butte (2)	
2000	Butte (3)	
2001	Butte (4)	
2002	Butte (5)	
2003	CC of San Francisco	
2004	CC of San Francisco (2)	
2005	CC of San Francisco (3)	
2006	Santa Rosa; Foothill; CC of San Francisco (4)	
2007	Foothill (2)	
2008	Butte (6)	
2009	San Mateo; CC of San Francisco (5)	
2010	CC of San Francisco (6)	
2011	CC of San Francisco (7)	
2012	Butte (7); CC of San Francisco (8); De Anza	
2013	Butte (8)	

== Yearly standings ==
1990 NorCal Football League standings
	Conf.			Overall
Team	W		L	W		L
Taft $	6	–	0	8	–	1
College of the Sequoias	4	–	2	9	–	2
Fresno City	4	–	2	8	–	3
Merced	3	–	3	8	–	3
Sacramento City	3	–	3	5	–	5
American River	1	–	5	3	–	7
Santa Rosa	0	–	6	2	–	8
$ – Conference champion

1991 NorCal Football League standings
	Conf.			Overall
Team	W		L	W		L
College of the Sequoias +	5	–	1	10	–	1
Sacramento City +	5	–	1	8	–	2
American River	3	–	3	6	–	4
Taft	3	–	3	5	–	4
Fresno City	2	–	4	5	–	5
Santa Rosa	2	–	4	3	–	7
Merced	1	–	5	3	–	7
+ – Conference co-champions

1992 NorCal Football League standings
	Conf.					Overall
Team	W		L		T	W		L		T
Sacramento City $	6	–	0	–	0	10	–	0	–	1
Taft	4	–	2	–	0	6	–	3	–	0
Fresno City	3	–	2	–	1	6	–	4	–	1
Santa Rosa	3	–	3	–	0	4	–	6	–	0
Merced	2	–	4	–	0	3	–	7	–	0
College of the Sequoias	1	–	4	–	1	3	–	6	–	1
American River	1	–	5	–	0	3	–	7	–	0
$ – Conference champion

1993 NorCal Football League standings
	Conf.					Overall
Team	W		L		T	W		L		T
Fresno City $	5	–	1	–	0	8	–	2	–	0
Taft	4	–	1	–	1	6	–	1	–	2
Sacramento City	4	–	2	–	0	8	–	2	–	0
Merced	3	–	2	–	1	6	–	3	–	1
College of the Sequoias	3	–	3	–	0	5	–	5	–	0
Santa Rosa	1	–	5	–	0	1	–	9	–	0
American River	0	–	6	–	0	3	–	7	–	0
$ – Conference champion

1995 NorCal Football Conference standings
	Conf.			Overall
Team	W		L	W		L
Golden Division
No. 4 Sacramento City x	7	–	1	9	–	1
No. 14 Laney	5	–	2	7	–	3
Butte	5	–	2	6	–	4
College of the Siskiyous	4	–	3	6	–	4
Shasta	3	–	4	5	–	5
American River	2	–	5	4	–	6
Santa Rosa	2	–	5	2	–	8
Diablo Valley	1	–	6	3	–	7
Bay Division
No. T20 Los Medanos x	7	–	1	7	–	3
No. 18 College of the Redwoods	6	–	2	8	–	2
San Joaquin Delta	6	–	2	7	–	3
Solano	6	–	2	7	–	3
Marin	5	–	3	6	–	4
Mendocino	3	–	5	3	–	7
Sierra	2	–	6	2	–	8
Yuba	1	–	7	1	–	9
Contra Costa	0	–	8	0	–	10
x – Division champion/co-champions; Rankings from Coaches' Poll

1996 NorCal Football Conference standings
	Conf.			Overall
Team	W		L	W		L
Golden Division
No. 4 Sacramento City x	7	–	0	10	–	1
No. 7 Butte	6	–	1	9	–	2
College of the Siskiyous	4	–	3	7	–	3
Laney	4	–	3	6	–	4
Shasta	4	–	3	6	–	4
Santa Rosa	2	–	5	4	–	6
American River	1	–	6	3	–	7
Diablo Valley	0	–	7	0	–	10
Bay Division
No. 17 College of the Redwoods x	7	–	1	8	–	3
Marin	6	–	2	8	–	3
No. 13 San Joaquin Delta	6	–	2	9	–	2
Los Medanos	5	–	3	6	–	5
Mendocino	4	–	4	4	–	6
Sierra	3	–	5	3	–	7
Contra Costa	2	–	6	2	–	8
Solano #	2	–	6	2	–	8
Yuba	1	–	7	1	–	9
x – Division champion/co-champions; # – Solano forfeited against Marin, Sierra, and San Jose City; Rankings from Coaches' Poll

1997 NorCal Conference football standings
	Conf.			Overall
Team	W		L	W		L
No. 9 Butte $	4	–	1	8	–	3
No. 18 Santa Rosa	3	–	2	7	–	4
No. 17 Sacramento City	3	–	2	7	–	4
Shasta	2	–	3	5	–	6
College of the Siskiyous	2	–	3	4	–	6
Laney	1	–	4	5	–	5
$ – Conference champion; Rankings from Coaches' Poll

1998 NorCal Conference football standings
	Conf.			Overall
Team	W		L	W		L
Sacramento City $	5	–	0	8	–	2
Shasta	3	–	2	8	–	2
College of the Siskiyous	2	–	3	6	–	4
Laney	2	–	3	5	–	5
Butte	2	–	3	7	–	3
Santa Rosa	1	–	4	6	–	4
$ – Conference champion

1999 NorCal Conference football standings
	Conf.			Overall
Team	W		L	W		L
No. 2 Butte $	5	–	0	10	–	0
No. 11 Sacramento City	3	–	2	8	–	2
No. 19 College of the Siskiyous	3	–	2	7	–	3
Laney	2	–	3	5	–	5
Shasta	1	–	4	5	–	5
Santa Rosa	1	–	4	5	–	5
$ – Conference champion; Rankings from Coaches' Poll

2000 NorCal Conference football standings
	Conf.			Overall
Team	W		L	W		L
No. 7 Butte $	5	–	0	9	–	2
No. 8 Sacramento City	4	–	1	9	–	2
Shasta	2	–	3	6	–	5
Santa Rosa	2	–	3	6	–	5
College of the Siskiyous	1	–	4	2	–	8
Laney	1	–	4	1	–	9
$ – Conference champion; Rankings from Coaches' Poll

2001 NorCal Conference football standings
	Conf.			Overall
Team	W		L	W		L
Butte $	4	–	0	7	–	3
Santa Rosa	3	–	1	8	–	2
Sacramento City #	1	–	3	4	–	6
Shasta	1	–	3	4	–	6
College of the Siskiyous	1	–	3	2	–	8
$ – Conference champion; # – Sacramento City forfeited against College of the Sequoias and Santa Rosa

2002 NorCal Conference football standings
	Conf.			Overall
Team	W		L	W		L
Butte $	5	–	0	10	–	1
Foothill	4	–	1	9	–	2
CC of San Francisco	3	–	2	9	–	2
Chabot	1	–	4	4	–	6
College of the Redwoods	1	–	4	4	–	6
Sacramento City	1	–	4	3	–	7
$ – Conference champion

2003 NorCal Conference football standings
	Conf.			Overall
Team	W		L	W		L
No. 1 CC of San Francisco $	5	–	0	12	–	0
No. 11 Butte	4	–	1	9	–	2
Foothill	3	–	2	5	–	5
Sacramento City	2	–	3	3	–	7
Chabot	1	–	4	2	–	8
College of the Redwoods	0	–	5	0	–	10
$ – Conference champion; Rankings from Coaches' Poll

2004 NorCal Conference football standings
	Conf.			Overall
Team	W		L	W		L
No. 1 CC of San Francisco $	5	–	0	10	–	0
No. 4 Butte	4	–	1	9	–	1
No. 13 Foothill	3	–	2	7	–	3
No. 16 Santa Rosa	2	–	3	6	–	4
No. 22 San Mateo	1	–	4	6	–	4
Sacramento City	0	–	5	2	–	8
$ – Conference champion; Rankings from Coaches' Poll

2005 NorCal Conference football standings
	Conf.			Overall
Team	W		L	W		L
No. 4 CC of San Francisco $	4	–	1	9	–	1
No. 10 San Mateo	3	–	2	7	–	3
No. 18 Butte	3	–	2	6	–	3
No. 14 Foothill	2	–	3	7	–	3
No. 13 Santa Rosa	2	–	3	7	–	3
Sacramento City	1	–	4	3	–	7
$ – Conference champion; Rankings from Coaches' Poll

2006 NorCal Conference football standings
	Conf.			Overall
Team	W		L	W		L
Santa Rosa +	4	–	1	9	–	1
Foothill +	4	–	1	9	–	1
CC of San Francisco +	4	–	1	9	–	1
Feather River	2	–	3	6	–	4
San Mateo	1	–	4	6	–	4
Butte	0	–	5	2	–	8
+ – Conference co-champions

2007 NorCal Conference football standings
	Conf.			Overall
Team	W		L	W		L
Foothill +	5	–	0	10	–	0
CC of San Francisco +	5	–	0	9	–	1
Butte	2	–	2	6	–	3
Santa Rosa	1	–	3	6	–	3
San Mateo	1	–	4	6	–	4
Feather River	0	–	5	2	–	8
+ – Conference co-champions

2008 NorCal Conference football standings
	Conf.			Overall
Team	W		L	W		L
Butte $	5	–	0	10	–	0
CC of San Francisco	4	–	1	7	–	3
Santa Rosa	3	–	2	7	–	3
Foothill	2	–	3	7	–	3
San Mateo	1	–	4	5	–	5
Diablo Valley	0	–	5	2	–	8
$ – Conference champion

2009 NorCal Conference football standings
	Conf.			Overall
Team	W		L	W		L
San Mateo +	4	–	1	9	–	1
CC of San Francisco +	4	–	1	9	–	1
Foothill	3	–	2	7	–	3
Butte	2	–	3	7	–	3
Santa Rosa	1	–	4	5	–	5
Diablo Valley	1	–	4	3	–	7
+ – Conference co-champions

2010 NorCal Conference football standings
	Conf.			Overall
Team	W		L	W		L
CC of San Francisco $	5	–	0	11	–	0
Foothill	3	–	2	9	–	2
Butte	3	–	2	9	–	2
San Mateo	2	–	3	8	–	3
Laney	2	–	3	5	–	5
Santa Rosa	0	–	5	3	–	7
$ – Conference champion

2011 NorCal Conference football standings
	Conf.			Overall
Team	W		L	W		L
CC of San Francisco $	5	–	0	10	–	0
Butte	4	–	1	9	–	1
San Mateo	3	–	2	7	–	3
Santa Rosa	2	–	3	5	–	5
Foothill	1	–	4	5	–	5
Laney	0	–	5	2	–	8
$ – Conference champion

2012 NorCal Conference football standings
	Conf.			Overall
Team	W		L	W		L
Butte +	4	–	1	10	–	1
CC of San Francisco +	4	–	1	10	–	2
De Anza +	4	–	1	8	–	3
San Mateo	2	–	3	7	–	4
Santa Rosa	1	–	4	3	–	7
Foothill	0	–	5	3	–	7
+ – Conference co-champions

2013 NorCal Conference football standings
	Conf.			Overall
Team	W		L	W		L
Butte $	5	–	0	12	–	0
San Mateo	4	–	1	10	–	1
CC of San Francisco	3	–	2	8	–	3
Santa Rosa	2	–	3	6	–	5
De Anza	1	–	4	4	–	6
Foothill	0	–	5	2	–	8
$ – Conference champion
