= Shorty Hughes =

American football coach (1922–2003)

Biographical details
- Born: September 17, 1922; Bowie County, Texas, U.S.
- Died: June 6, 2003 (aged 80)

Coaching career (HC unless noted)
- 1949: Humble HS (TX)
- 1952–1960: Deer Park HS (TX)
- 1962–1970: Stephen F. Austin

Administrative career (AD unless noted)
- 1963–1970: Stephen F. Austin

Head coaching record
- Overall: 38–48–1 (college)

Travis Thurman "Shorty" Hughes (September 17, 1922 – June 6, 2003) was an American football coach and college athletics administrator. He served as the head football coach at Stephen F. Austin State University in Nacogdoches, Texas from 1962 to 1970, compiled a record of 38–48–1. Hughes was the head football coach at Humble High School in Humble, Texas in 1949 and Deer Park High School in Deer Park, Texas from 1952 to 1960.

== Head coaching record ==
=== College ===
Year	Team	Overall	Conference	Standing	Bowl/playoffs
Stephen F. Austin Lumberjacks (Lone Star Conference) (1962–1970)
1962	Stephen F. Austin	1–9	1–6	7th	
1963	Stephen F. Austin	7–3	4–2	T–2nd	
1964	Stephen F. Austin	4–5	3–3	5th	
1965	Stephen F. Austin	6–3	4–2	T–2nd	
1966	Stephen F. Austin	5–3–1	3–3–1	T–4th	
1967	Stephen F. Austin	4–6	3–4	T–5th	
1968	Stephen F. Austin	3–7	1–6	8th	
1969	Stephen F. Austin	7–3	5–2	3rd	
1970	Stephen F. Austin	1–9	1–8	T–9th	
Stephen F. Austin:		38–48–1	25–36–1		
Total:		38–48–1			
