= 2009 Eastern Washington Eagles football team =

American college football season

2009 Eastern Washington Eagles football

FCS First Round, L 33–44 vs. Stephen F. Austin
- Conference: Big Sky Conference

Ranking
- Sports Network: No. 13
- FCS Coaches: No. 13
- Record: 8–4 (6–2 Big Sky)
- Head coach: Beau Baldwin (2nd season)
- Offensive coordinator: Aaron Best (2nd season)
- Defensive coordinator: John Graham (2nd season)
- Home stadium: Woodward Field

2009 Big Sky Conference football standings
	Conf.			Overall
Team	W		L	W		L
No. 2 Montana $^	8	–	0	14	–	1
No. 13 Eastern Washington ^	6	–	2	8	–	4
No. 17 Weber State ^	6	–	2	7	–	5
Montana State	5	–	3	7	–	4
Northern Arizona	4	–	4	5	–	6
Sacramento State	4	–	4	5	–	6
Northern Colorado	1	–	7	3	–	8
Portland State	1	–	7	2	–	9
Idaho State	1	–	7	1	–	10
$ – Conference champion; ^ – FCS playoff participant; Rankings from The Sports Network poll

The 2009 Eastern Washington Eagles football team represented Eastern Washington University in the 2009 NCAA Division I FCS football season. They played their home games at Woodward Field in Cheney, Washington. The team finished 8–4 (6–2 Big Sky) and improved on their record from 2008 in which they finished 6–5.

== Schedule ==
Date	Time	Opponent	Rank	Site	TV	Result	Attendance
September 4	7:00 p.m.	Western Oregon*		Woodward Field; Cheney, WA		W 35–14	3,113
September 12	3:30 p.m.	at No. 10 California*	No. 20	California Memorial Stadium; Berkeley, CA	FSN	L 7–59	58,083
September 19	12:00 p.m.	Northern Colorado	No. 20	Woodward Field; Cheney, WA	SWX	W 16–0	5,538
September 26	1:05 p.m.	at Sacramento State	No. 18	Hornet Stadium; Sacramento, CA		W 56–30	10,175
October 3	6:05 p.m.	at Idaho State	No. 15	Holt Arena; Pocatello, ID		W 38–3	6,003
October 10	2:35 p.m.	No. 21 Weber State	No. 17	Woodward Field; Cheney, WA	ALT	L 13–31	5,370
October 17	3:30 p.m.	at No. 3 Montana	No. 21	Washington–Grizzly Stadium; Missoula, MT (EWU–UM Governors Cup)	SWX	L 34–41	25,751
October 31	12:05 p.m.	Montana State^{†}	No. 21	Woodward Field; Cheney, WA	SWX	W 28–17	6,632
November 7	1:05 p.m.	vs. Portland State	No. 16	Qwest Field; Seattle, WA (Showdown on the Sound, The Dam Cup)		W 41-10	6,124
November 14	1:05 p.m.	at Southern Utah*	No. 18	Eccles Coliseum; Cedar City, UT		W 48–21	3,011
November 21	2:00 p.m.	at No. 25 Northern Arizona	No. 18	Walkup Skydome; Flagstaff, AZ		W 49–45	5,023
November 28	12:00 p.m.	at No. 12 Stephen F. Austin*	No. 14	Homer Bryce Stadium; Nacogdoches, TX (NCAA Division I First Round)	CBSCS	L 33–44	8,224
*Non-conference game; ^{†}Homecoming; Rankings from The Sports Network Poll released prior to the game; All times are in Pacific time

== Game summaries ==
=== Western Oregon ===
Sophomore Taiwan Jones scored on an 87-yard run on his first carry as an Eastern Washington University running back. But it wasn't that easy the rest of the way in EWU's 35–14 non-conference college football victory against Western Oregon Saturday (September 5) at Woodward Field in Cheney, Washington

The Eagles, ranked 18th in the preseason NCAA Football Championship Subdivision rankings, scored 14 fourth-quarter points on a pair of Matt Nichols-to-Nathan Overbay touchdown passes as they survived for the win over the NCAA Division II Wolves.

=== California ===
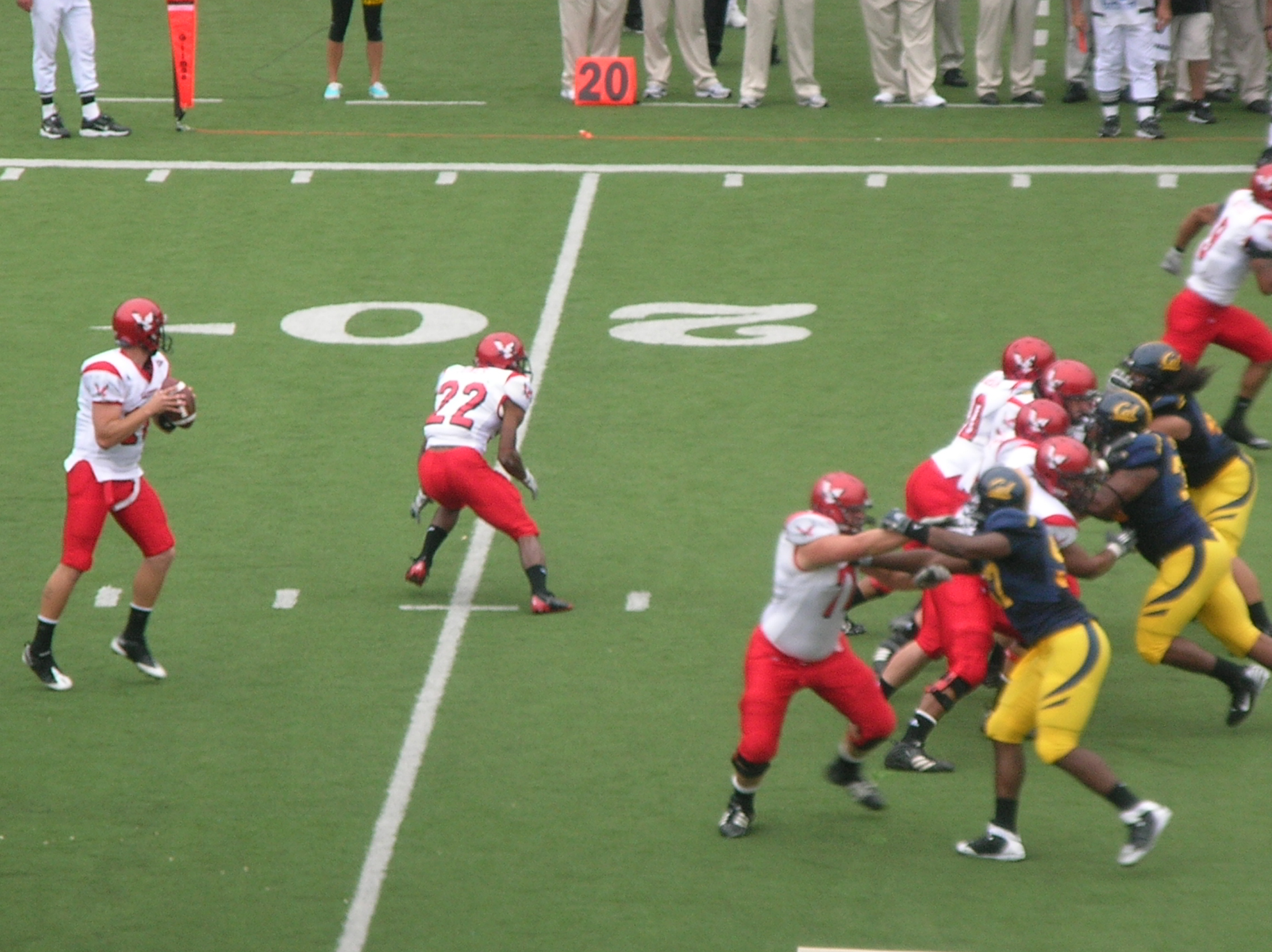
Matt Nichols throwing a pass against Cal.

Eastern Washington scored on an 83-yard drive in the first quarter, but the California Bears performed as advertised after that to score 52 unanswered points and record a 59–7 victory over Eastern Washington Saturday (September 12) at Memorial Stadium in Berkeley, California. In a match-up between the Big Sky Conference and the Pacific-10 Conference, Eastern entered the game ranked 18th in the Sports Network FCS poll. Cal, meanwhile, was ranked 10th in the Associated Press poll in the NCAA Football Bowl Division and represented the second-highest ranked team EWU has ever played (West Virginia was sixth when they beat EWU 52–3 in 2006).

Heisman Trophy candidate Jahvid Best rushed for 144 yards on 17 carries and scored twice for the Golden Bears, who are now 2–0. The Eagles, now 1–1, were out-gained 392–14 on the ground. In all, California had 507 yards of offense to EWU's 235.

=== Northern Colorado ===
The defense forced four turnovers and was equally effective on fourth down as Eastern Washington University shut-out Northern Colorado 16–0 Saturday (September 19) in the Big Sky Conference football opener for both schools at Woodward Field in Cheney, Washington

The Eagles recovered three fumbles and had an interception in Eastern's first shutout at Woodward Field since 1983. The Eagles have had six other shutouts since then either on the road or in Spokane, including a 34–0 win over UNC in 2006. Eastern also held the Bears to a 0-of-4 performance on fourth down and had four sacks.

=== Sacramento State ===
The Eastern Washington University football team has a winning record at Sacramento State. The Eagles are 10–0 against the Hornets in Sacramento, and were 15–13 against the Hornets in Sacramento last season.

The 19th-ranked Eagles scored 35 first-half points and went on to hold-off Sacramento State 56–30 Saturday (September 26) in sweltering heat at Hornet Stadium in Sacramento, California The win puts the Eastern Washington Eagles in first place in the Big Sky Conference, and also makes a statement in FCS play as EWU is now ranks #17.

=== Idaho State ===
Running back Taiwan Jones had another big day, but so did quarterback Matt Nichols and wide receiver Aaron Boyce as Eastern Washington remained unbeaten in the Big Sky Conference football standings with a 38–3 victory over Idaho State Saturday (Oct. 3) at Holt Arena in Pocatello, Idaho. Jones rushed for 168 yards and three touchdowns on just 14 carries (12.0 per rush), including a school-record 96-yard rush for a score in the third quarter. He broke the previous record of 95 yards set by John Ditz against Lewis & Clark in 1954. Last week, Jones had 190 yards and four touchdowns against Sacramento State to earn national player of the week honors.

Nichols completed 27-of-38 passes for 293 yards and a pair of touchdown passes to Boyce, who caught 10 passes for 149 yards. Nichols came up just short of his 13th 300-yard passing performance in his career, but it was the 12th 100-yard receiving output for Boyce. Eastern, which entered the game ranked 17th in the Sports Network NCAA Football Championship Subdivision poll, is now 4–1 overall, and has its third 3–0 start in Big Sky history (1992, 2004).

== Matt Nichols ==
Nichols now has twelve 300-yard passing games in his 35-game career and 14 performances with at least 300 yards of total offense. On EWU's career passing lists, Nichols ranks in the top five in all categories, including second in total offense (9,376) and second in passing yards (8,786) The record holder for both passing yards and total offense is 2005 Payton Award winner Erik Meyer (2002–05) with 10,261 passing yards and 10,942 yards of total offense. Meyer is the player Nichols replaced in 2006 as Eastern's starting quarterback. Nichols now owns the school record with 1,150 career pass attempts, and also ranks fifth in efficiency rating (136.0), second in touchdown passes (63, ranking only behind the 84 of Meyer), second in completions (698) and third in interceptions (40). With 590 rushing yards in his career, Nichols is approaching the EWU career record for a quarterback of 681 set by Meyer. Nichols has been a part of four of the 36-longest pass plays in school history of 70, 78, 80 and 85 yards, but just the 80-yarder was a touchdown. Nichols has the most starts among returning players in 2009 with 33. At the beginning of the 2009 season Nichols was again, named to the Walter Payton Award watchlist.
