= Marshall Sperbeck =

American football player and coach (born 1960)

Biographical details
- Born: May 19, 1960 (age 66); Sacramento, California, U.S.

Playing career
- 1979: Oregon State
- 1981–1982: Nevada
- Position: Quarterback

Coaching career (HC unless noted)
- 1985: Foothill (QB/WR)
- 1986–1991: Foothill (OC)
- 1992–2006: Foothill
- 2007–2013: Sacramento State

Head coaching record
- Overall: 35–44 (college); 109–52 (junior college)
- Bowls: 8–3 (junior college)

Accomplishments and honors

Championships
- 1 NorCal (2006)

Thomas Marshall Sperbeck III (born May 19, 1960) is an American college football coach and former player. Sperbeck was the head football coach at California State University, Sacramento from 2007 to April 2014, resigning in the midst of an NCAA investigation into violations committed under his supervision.

== Coaching career ==
Prior to his tenure at Sacramento State, Sperbeck was head coach for 15 seasons at Foothill College in Los Altos Hills, California, amassing a 109–52 record.

Sperbeck was named the ninth head football coach at Sacramento State on January 13, 2007. His tenure would end via resignation after the 2013 season. After Sperbeck's departure, an NCAA investigation found that the Hornets football program has committed several secondary violations during his stint as the team's head coach.

== Administrative career ==
In 2015, Sperbeck became vice president of development at Jesuit High School in Carmichael.

== Head coaching record ==
=== College ===
Year	Team	Overall	Conference	Standing	Bowl/playoffs
Sacramento State Hornets (Big Sky Conference) (2007–2013)
2007	Sacramento State	3–8	3–5	T–6th	
2008	Sacramento State	6–6	3–5	T–6th	
2009	Sacramento State	5–6	4–4	T–5th	
2010	Sacramento State	6–5	5–3	T–3rd	
2011	Sacramento State	4–7	3–5	T–6th	
2012	Sacramento State	6–5	4–4	T–5th	
2013	Sacramento State	5–7	4–4	8th	
Sacramento State:		35–44	26–30		
Total:		35–44			

=== Junior college ===
Year	Team	Overall	Conference	Standing	Bowl/playoffs	CCCAA^{#}
Foothill Owls (Coast Conference) (1992–1996)
1992	Foothill	4–6	3–5	5th (North)		
1993	Foothill	5–5	4–4	T–2nd (North)		
1994	Foothill	7–4	2–3	T–3rd (North)	L SOS Graffiti Bowl	
1995	Foothill	8–3	3–2	T–2nd (North)	L Santa Cruz County Lions Bowl	12
1996	Foothill	4–6	2–3	4th (North)		
Foothill Owls (Golden Gate Conference) (1997–2001)
1997	Foothill	6–5	2–3	T–3rd	L Silicon Valley Bowl	15 (Northern)
1998	Foothill	10–1	4–1	2nd	W Silicon Valley Bowl	5
1999	Foothill	9–2	4–1	2nd	W Silicon Valley Bowl	10
2000	Foothill	8–3	4–1	2nd	W Silicon Valley Bowl	13
2001	Foothill	8–3	3–1	2nd	W Silicon Valley Bowl	
Foothill Owls (NorCal Conference) (2002–2006)
2002	Foothill	9–2	4–1	2nd	W Silicon Valley Bowl	8
2003	Foothill	5–5	3–2	3rd		14 (Northern)
2004	Foothill	8–3	3–2	3rd	W Silicon Valley Bowl	13
2005	Foothill	8–3	2–3	T–4th	W Silicon Valley Bowl	14
2006	Foothill	10–1	4–1	T–1st	W Silicon Valley Bowl	
Foothill:		109–52	47–33			
Total:		109–52				
National championship Conference title Conference division title or championship game berth
