= 2009 Montana Grizzlies football team =

American college football season

2009 Montana Grizzlies football

Big Sky champion

FCS Championship Game, L 21–23 vs. Villanova
- Conference: Big Sky Conference

Ranking
- Sports Network: No. 2
- Record: 14–1 (8–0 Big Sky)
- Head coach: Bobby Hauck (7th season)
- Offensive coordinator: Rob Phenicie (7th season)
- Defensive coordinator: Kraig Paulson (6th season)
- Home stadium: Washington–Grizzly Stadium

2009 Big Sky Conference football standings
	Conf.			Overall
Team	W		L	W		L
No. 2 Montana $^	8	–	0	14	–	1
No. 13 Eastern Washington ^	6	–	2	8	–	4
No. 17 Weber State ^	6	–	2	7	–	5
Montana State	5	–	3	7	–	4
Northern Arizona	4	–	4	5	–	6
Sacramento State	4	–	4	5	–	6
Northern Colorado	1	–	7	3	–	8
Portland State	1	–	7	2	–	9
Idaho State	1	–	7	1	–	10
$ – Conference champion; ^ – FCS playoff participant; Rankings from The Sports Network poll

The 2009 Montana Grizzlies Football Team represented the University of Montana in the 2009 NCAA Division I FCS football season. The Grizzlies were led by head coach Bobby Hauck and played their home games at Washington–Grizzly Stadium.

== Schedule ==
Date	Time	Opponent	Rank	Site	TV	Result	Attendance	Source
September 5	1:00 pm	Western State*	No. 3	Washington–Grizzly Stadium; Missoula, MT	KPAX	W 38–0	25,698	
September 12	8:00 pm	at UC Davis*	No. 3	Aggie Stadium; Davis, CA	KPAX	W 17–10	9,087	
September 19	1:00 pm	Portland State	No. 4	Washington–Grizzly Stadium; Missoula, MT	KPAX	W 49–17	25,726	
September 26	4:00 pm	at Northern Arizona	No. 4	Walkup Skydome; Flagstaff, AZ	KPAX	W 41–34 ^{OT}	7,212	
October 10	1:00 pm	No. 15 Cal Poly*^{†}	No. 4	Washington–Grizzly Stadium; Missoula, MT	KPAX	W 35–23	25,694	
October 17	1:00 pm	No. 21 Eastern Washington	No. 3	Washington–Grizzly Stadium; Missoula, MT (EWU–UM Governors Cup)	KPAX	W 41–34	25,751	
October 24	3:00 pm	at Sacramento State	No. 2	Hornet Stadium; Sacramento, CA	KPAX	W 45–30	7,629	
October 31	1:00 pm	No. 14 Weber State	No. 2	Washington–Grizzly Stadium; Missoula, MT	KPAX	W 31–10	25,811	
November 7	3:30 pm	at Idaho State	No. 2	Holt Arena; Pocatello, ID	KPAX	W 12–10	6,461	
November 14	12:00 pm	Northern Colorado	No. 2	Washington–Grizzly Stadium; Missoula, MT	KPAX	W 38–10	25,231	
November 21	12:00 pm	at No. 23 Montana State	No. 1	Bobcat Stadium; Bozeman, MT (rivalry)	KPAX	W 33–19	15,127	
November 28	12:05 pm	No. 11 South Dakota State*	No. 2	Washington–Grizzly Stadium; Missoula, MT (NCAA Division I First Round)	KPAX	W 61–48	19,197	
December 5	12:05 pm	No. 10 Stephen F. Austin*	No. 2	Washington–Grizzly Stadium; Missoula, MT (NCAA Division I Quarterfinal)		W 51–0	22,438	
December 12	2:05 pm	No. 3 Appalachian State*	No. 2	Washington–Grizzly Stadium; Missoula, MT (NCAA Division I Semifinal)		W 24–17	24,207	
December 18	8:00 pm	No. 1 Villanova*	No. 2	Finley Stadium; Chattanooga, TN (NCAA Division I Championship Game)		L 21–23	14,328	
*Non-conference game; ^{†}Homecoming; Rankings from The Sports Network Poll released prior to the game
