= DeKalb Independent School District =

School district in Texas

- DeKalb, Bowie, Texas

District information
- Grades: PK-12
- Schools: 3

Other information
- Website: http://www.dekalbisd.net/

DeKalb Independent School District is a public school district based in DeKalb, Texas.

In 2015, the school was rated "Met Standard" by the Texas Education Agency.

The district is entirely in Bowie County and includes De Kalb.

== History ==
The district changed to a four day school week in fall 2022.

== Schools ==
- DeKalb High School (Grades 9‍–‍12)

During 2022‍–‍2023, DeKalb High School had an enrollment of 272 students in grades 9‍–‍12 and a student to teacher ratio of 11.16.

- James L Germany Middle School (Grades 5‍–‍8)

During 2022‍–‍2023, James L Germany Middle School had an enrollment of 235 students in grades 5‍–‍8 and a student to teacher ratio of 11.38.

- DeKalb Elementary School (Grades PK‍–‍4)

During 2022‍–‍2023, DeKalb Elementary School had an enrollment of 321 students in grades PK‍–‍4 and a student to teacher ratio of 14.71.
