= 2009 Lehigh Mountain Hawks football team =

American college football season

2009 Lehigh Mountain Hawks football
- Conference: Patriot League
- Record: 4–7 (4–2 Patriot)
- Head coach: Andy Coen (4th season)
- Offensive coordinator: Trey Brown (4th season)
- Captains: B. J. Benning; Matt Cohen
- Home stadium: Goodman Stadium

2009 Patriot League football standings
| | Conf. | | | Overall |
| Team | W | | L | W | | L |
|---|---|---|---|---|---|---|
| No. 14 Holy Cross $^ | 5 | – | 1 | 9 | – | 3 |
| No. 21 Colgate | 4 | – | 2 | 9 | – | 2 |
| No. 24 Lafayette | 4 | – | 2 | 8 | – | 3 |
| Lehigh | 4 | – | 2 | 4 | – | 7 |
| Fordham | 2 | – | 4 | 5 | – | 6 |
| Bucknell | 2 | – | 4 | 4 | – | 7 |
| Georgetown | 0 | – | 6 | 0 | – | 11 |
$ – Conference champion; ^ – FCS playoff participant; Rankings from The Sports Network poll

The 2009 Lehigh Mountain Hawks football team was an American football team that represented Lehigh University during the 2009 NCAA Division I FCS football season. Lehigh tied for second in the Patriot League.

In their fourth year under head coach Andy Coen, the Mountain Hawks compiled a 4–7 record. B.J . Benning and Matt Cohen were the team captains.

The Mountain Hawks were outscored 234 to 230. All of their losses, however, were to non-conference opponents, and their 4–2 conference record placed them in a three-way tie with Colgate and Lafayette for second in the Patriot League standings.

Lehigh played its home games at Goodman Stadium on the university's Goodman Campus in Bethlehem, Pennsylvania.

== Schedule ==
| Date | Opponent | Site | Result | Attendance | Source |
|---|---|---|---|---|---|
| September 5 | Central Connecticut State* | Goodman Stadium; Bethlehem, PA | L 21–28 | 6,140 | |
| September 12 | at No. 3 Villanova* | Villanova Stadium; Villanova, PA | L 17–38 | 8,811 | |
| September 26 | Princeton* | Goodman Stadium; Bethlehem, PA | L 14–17 | 8,168 | |
| October 3 | Harvard* | Goodman Stadium; Bethlehem, PA | L 14–28 | 5,457 | |
| October 10 | Georgetown | Goodman Stadium; Bethlehem, PA | W 27–0 | 5,789 | |
| October 17 | Yale* | Goodman Stadium; Bethlehem, PA | L 0–7 | 5,847 | |
| October 24 | at Bucknell | Christy Mathewson–Memorial Stadium; Lewisburg, PA | W 35–16 | 2,246 | |
| October 31 | at No. 24 Colgate | Andy Kerr Stadium; Hamilton, NY | L 20–27 | | |
| November 7 | No. 13 Holy Cross | Goodman Stadium; Bethlehem, PA | L 20–24 | 9,797 | |
| November 14 | at Fordham | Coffey Field; Bronx, NY | W 35–28 | | |
| November 21 | No. 21 Lafayette | Goodman Stadium; Bethlehem, PA (The Rivalry) | W 27–21 ^{OT} | 15,714 | |
*Non-conference game; Rankings from The Sports Network Poll released prior to the game
