= 2009 Gardner–Webb Runnin' Bulldogs football team =

American college football season

2009 Gardner–Webb Runnin' Bulldogs football
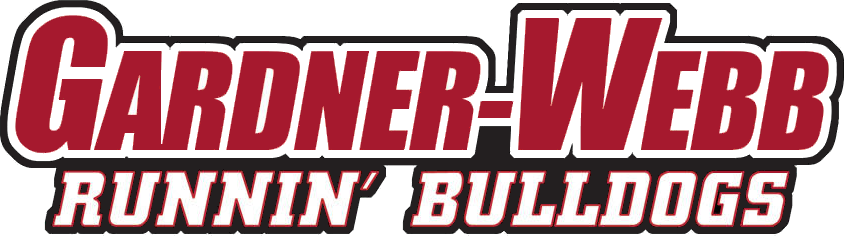
- Conference: Big South Conference
- Record: 6–5 (4–2 Big South)
- Head coach: Steve Patton (13th season)
- Defensive coordinator: John Windham (3rd season)
- Home stadium: Ernest W. Spangler Stadium

2009 Big South Conference football standings
	Conf.			Overall
Team	W		L	W		L
No. 22 Liberty +	5	–	1	8	–	3
Stony Brook +	5	–	1	6	–	5
Charleston Southern	4	–	2	6	–	5
Gardner–Webb	3	–	3	6	–	5
Coastal Carolina	3	–	3	5	–	6
VMI	1	–	5	2	–	9
Presbyterian	0	–	6	0	–	11
+ – Conference co-champions; Rankings from The Sports Network poll

The 2009 Gardner–Webb Runnin' Bulldogs football team represented Gardner–Webb University as a member of the Big South Conference during the 2009 NCAA Division I FCS football season. Led by Steve Patton in his 13th-year as head coach, the Runnin' Bulldogs compiled an overall record of 6–5 with a mark of 4–2 in conference play, tying for third place in the Big South. Gardner–Webb played home games at Ernest W. Spangler Stadium in Boiling Springs, North Carolina.

== Schedule ==
Date	Time	Opponent	Site	TV	Result	Attendance	Source
September 5	6:00 pm	Mars Hill*	Ernest W. Spangler Stadium; Boiling Springs, NC		W 58–14	5,579	
September 12	6:00 pm	at Western Carolina*	Bob Waters Field at E. J. Whitmire Stadium; Cullowhee, NC		W 27–20	9,673	
September 19	6:00 pm	at NC State*	Carter–Finley Stadium; Raleigh, NC		L 14–45	53,452	
October 3	1:30 pm	at VMI	Alumni Memorial Field; Lexington, VA		W 27–23	5,846	
October 10	3:30 pm	at Buffalo*	University at Buffalo Stadium; Amherst, NY	Time Warner Cable SportsNet	L 3–40	15,812	
October 17	11:30 am	Charleston Southern	Ernest W. Spangler Stadium; Boiling Springs, NC	SportSouth	W 27–20	4,870	
October 24	6:00 pm	Southern Virginia*	Ernest W. Spangler Stadium; Boiling Springs, NC		W 65–0		
October 31	1:30 pm	Stony Brook	Ernest W. Spangler Stadium; Boiling Springs, NC	Big South Net	L 14–24	5,430	
November 7	12:30 pm	at Coastal Carolina	Brooks Stadium; Conway, SC		L 21–26	5,797	
November 14	1:30 pm	No. 16 Liberty	Ernest W. Spangler Stadium; Boiling Springs, NC	BSN	L 28–51	5,277	
November 21	1:00 pm	at Presbyterian	Bailey Memorial Stadium; Clinton, SC	BSN	W 21–14	2,554	
*Non-conference game; Rankings from The Sports Network Poll released prior to the game; All times are in Eastern time
