= 2009 Harvard Crimson football team =

American college football season

2009 Harvard Crimson football
- Conference: Ivy League
- Record: 7–3 (6–1 Ivy)
- Head coach: Tim Murphy (16th season)
- Offensive coordinator: Joel Lamb (4th season)
- Offensive scheme: Spread
- Defensive coordinator: Scott Larkee (1st season)
- Base defense: Multiple
- Home stadium: Harvard Stadium

2009 Ivy League football standings
	Conf.			Overall
Team	W		L	W		L
No. 20 Penn $	7	–	0	8	–	2
Harvard	6	–	1	7	–	3
Brown	4	–	3	6	–	4
Columbia	3	–	4	4	–	6
Princeton	3	–	4	4	–	6
Yale	2	–	5	4	–	6
Dartmouth	2	–	5	2	–	8
Cornell	1	–	6	2	–	8
$ – Conference champion; Rankings from The Sports Network poll

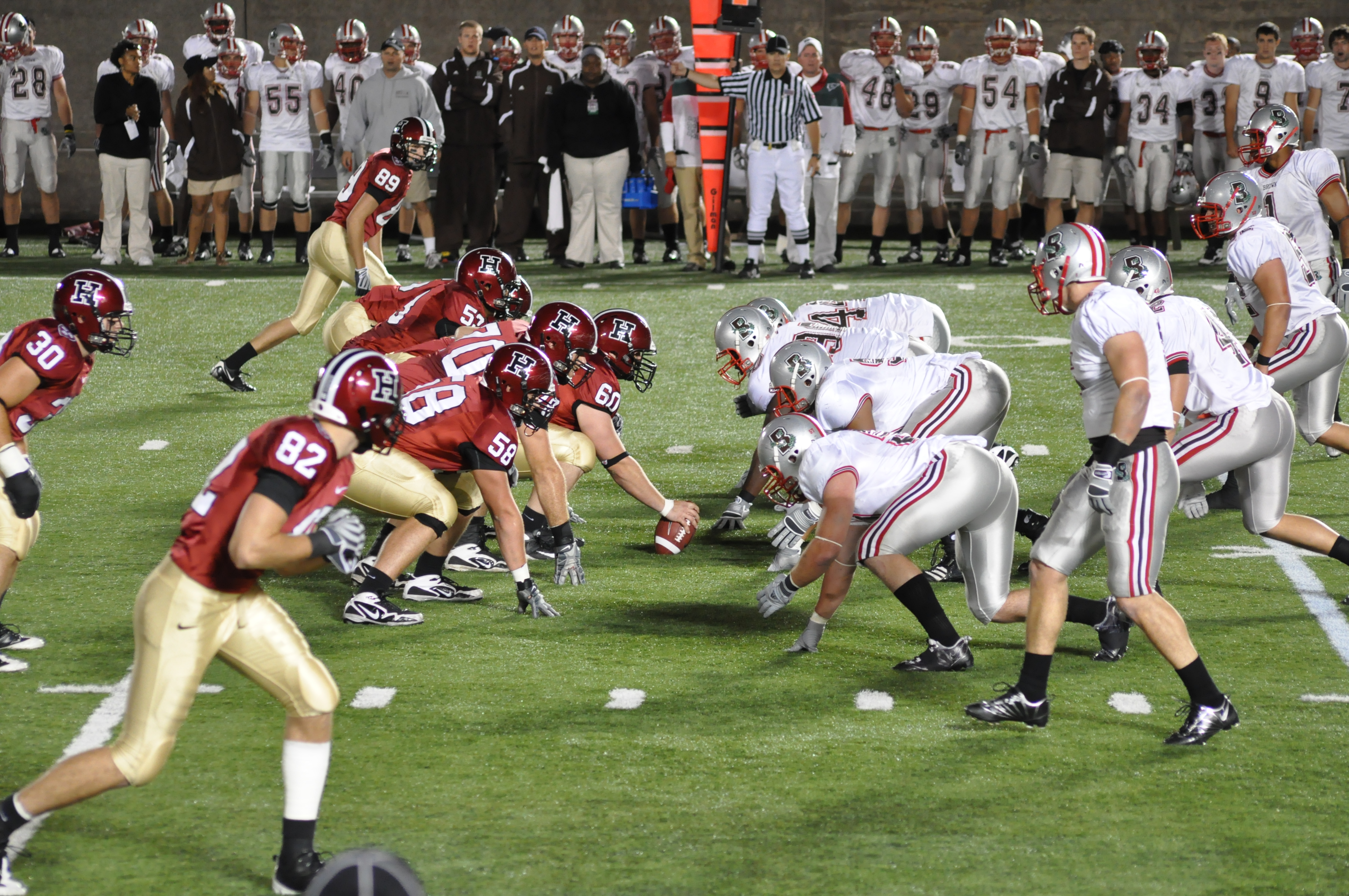
Harvard vs. Brown

The 2009 Harvard Crimson football team was an American football team that represented Harvard University in the 2009 NCAA Division I FCS football season. The Crimson finished second in the Ivy League. Harvard averaged 10,701 fans per game.

Harvard played its home games at Harvard Stadium in the Allston neighborhood of Boston, Massachusetts.

== Schedule ==
Date	Time	Opponent	Rank	Site	Result	Attendance	Source
September 19	1:00 pm	at No. 23 Holy Cross*	No. 25	Fitton Field; Worcester, MA	L 20–27	12,889	
September 25	7:00 pm	Brown^{†}		Harvard Stadium; Boston, MA	W 24–21	17,263	
October 3	12:30 pm	at Lehigh*		Goodman Stadium; Bethlehem, PA	W 28–14	5,457	
October 10	12:30 pm	at Cornell		Schoellkopf Field; Ithaca, NY	W 28–10	8,053	
October 17	12:00 p.m.	Lafayette*		Harvard Stadium; Boston, MA	L 18–35	7,146	
October 24	12:00 p.m.	Princeton		Harvard Stadium; Boston, MA (rivalry)	W 37–3	13,565	
October 31	12:00 p.m.	Dartmouth		Harvard Stadium; Boston, MA (rivalry)	W 42–21	8,107	
November 7	12:30 pm	at Columbia		Robert K. Kraft Field at Lawrence A. Wien Stadium; New York, NY	W 34–14	2,896	
November 14	12:00 p.m.	Penn		Harvard Stadium; Boston, MA (rivalry)	L 7–17	7,424	
November 21	12:00 p.m.	at Yale		Yale Bowl; New Haven, CT (The Game)	W 14–10	52,692	
*Non-conference game; ^{†}Homecoming; Rankings from The Sports Network Poll released prior to the game; All times are in Eastern time
