= Tom Williams (American football coach) =

American football player and coach (born 1969)

Biographical details
- Born: December 22, 1969 (age 56); Fort Worth, Texas, U.S.

Playing career
- 1989–1992: Stanford
- Position: Linebacker

Coaching career (HC unless noted)
- 1993–1994: Stanford (GA)
- 1995: Fujitsu Frontiers (DC)
- 1996–1998: Hawaii (LB/DC)
- 1999–2001: Washington (LB)
- 2002–2003: Stanford (DC/LB)
- 2004: Stanford (assoc. HC)
- 2005–2006: San Jose State (DC/LB)
- 2007–2008: Jacksonville Jaguars (DA/ST)
- 2009–2011: Yale
- 2012: UTEP (SAF)
- 2013: FIU (LB)
- 2014–2017: Greenhill School
- 2026 - Present: Bellarmine College Preparatory

Head coaching record
- Overall: 16–14

Tom Williams (born December 22, 1969) is an American football coach and former player. He is currently the Head Coach at Bellarmine College Preparatory in San Jose, CA. He was most recently the head football coach at Greenhill School from 2013 to 2017. Williams also served as head coach at Yale University from 2009 to 2011, compiling a record of 16–14. He was a linebacker at Stanford University from 1989 to 1992.

== Career ==
=== Playing career ===
Williams attended Trinity Valley School in his hometown of Fort Worth, Texas. During his tenure at Trinity Valley, he earned all-state honors in football, basketball, and baseball. Williams graduated from high school in 1988.

Williams attended Stanford University. Williams was a four-year starter and letterman for the Stanford Cardinals, playing linebacker from 1989–1992 and serving as captain his senior year. He was a two-time member of the Academic All-Pac-10 team and an honorable mention for All-Pac-10 his senior season.

=== Coaching career ===
After graduation, Williams worked as an assistant coach at Stanford University, the University of Hawaii, San Jose State University, and University of Washington before joining the Jacksonville Jaguars as an assistant coach from 2006 to 2008.

He accepted an offer in January 2009, to become the head football coach at Yale; he was the first black head football coach in the school's history and the second in the history of the Ivy League.

On November 17, 2011, the Rhodes Scholarship pursuits of Yale's Patrick Witt brought attention to Williams's claim that he was also a Rhodes Scholarship finalist. Williams claimed that he skipped his final interview in order to attend an NFL tryout. However, Rhodes Scholarship officials stated that they have no record of Tom Williams applying for a Rhodes Scholarship, and his name does not appear in the scholarship's trust databases. Yale launched an internal review on the matter.

Williams stepped down as Yale's head football coach. He admitted that he had never applied for a Rhodes Scholarship.

As of February 21, 2012, Williams was named University of Texas at El Paso's safeties coach. He served on the UTEP defensive staff under head football coach Mike Price.

== Personal life ==
Williams is married to Tonya Williams; they have four children: Grace, Tom, Ana, and Lauren. Williams graduated from Trinity Valley School in Fort Worth, Texas. He has a master's degree in university administration from Stanford University.

== Head coaching record ==
Year	Team	Overall	Conference	Standing	Bowl/playoffs
Yale Bulldogs (Ivy League) (2009–2011)
2009	Yale	4–6	2–5	T–6th	
2010	Yale	7–3	5–2	T–2nd	
2011	Yale	5–5	4–3	T–2nd	
Yale:		16–14	11–10		
Total:		16–14			
