= 2009 Holy Cross Crusaders football team =

American college football season

2009 Holy Cross Crusaders football

Patriot League champion

NCAA Division I First Round, L 28–38 vs. Villanova
- Conference: Patriot League

Ranking
- Sports Network: No. 14
- FCS Coaches: No. 14
- Record: 9–3 (5–1 Patriot)
- Head coach: Tom Gilmore (6th season)
- Offensive coordinator: Andy McKenzie (2nd season)
- Defensive coordinator: Richard Rodgers Sr. (4th season)
- Home stadium: Fitton Field

2009 Patriot League football standings
| | Conf. | | | Overall |
| Team | W | | L | W | | L |
|---|---|---|---|---|---|---|
| No. 14 Holy Cross $^ | 5 | – | 1 | 9 | – | 3 |
| No. 21 Colgate | 4 | – | 2 | 9 | – | 2 |
| No. 24 Lafayette | 4 | – | 2 | 8 | – | 3 |
| Lehigh | 4 | – | 2 | 4 | – | 7 |
| Fordham | 2 | – | 4 | 5 | – | 6 |
| Bucknell | 2 | – | 4 | 4 | – | 7 |
| Georgetown | 0 | – | 6 | 0 | – | 11 |
$ – Conference champion; ^ – FCS playoff participant; Rankings from The Sports Network poll

The 2009 Holy Cross Crusaders football team represented the College of the Holy Cross in the 2009 NCAA Division I FCS football season. They were led by sixth-year head coach Tom Gilmore and played their home games at Fitton Field. They were a member of the Patriot League. They finished the season 9–3, 5–1 in Patriot League play to finish in first place and won the conference title. They went to the FCS Playoffs where they lost to Villanova, 38–28.

== Schedule ==
| Date | Time | Opponent | Rank | Site | TV | Result | Attendance | Source |
|---|---|---|---|---|---|---|---|---|
| September 5 | 1:00 pm | Georgetown | No. 25 | Fitton Field; Worcester, MA | | W 20–7 | 5,897 | |
| September 12 | 1:00 pm | Sacred Heart* | No. 25 | Fitton Field; Worcester, MA | | W 52–21 | 2,897 | |
| September 19 | 1:00 pm | No. 25 Harvard* | No. 23 | Fitton Field; Worcester, MA | WCTR | W 27–20 | 12,889 | |
| October 3 | 1:00 pm | at Northeastern* | No. 21 | Parsons Field; Brookline, MA | | W 42–21 | 1,103 | |
| October 10 | 12:30 pm | at Brown* | No. 19 | Brown Stadium; Providence, RI | | L 31–34 | 5,110 | |
| October 17 | 1:00 pm | Dartmouth*^{†} | No. 25 | Fitton Field; Worcester, MA | | W 34–14 | 8,788 | |
| October 24 | 1:00 pm | No. 17 Colgate | No. 22 | Fitton Field; Worcester, MA | WCTR | W 42–28 | 9,547 | |
| October 31 | 1:00 pm | at Fordham | No. 17 | Coffey Field; Bronx, NY (Ram–Crusader Cup) | | W 41–27 | 3,449 | |
| November 7 | 12:30 pm | at Lehigh | No. 13 | Goodman Stadium; Bethlehem, PA | SE2 | W 24–20 | 9,797 | |
| November 14 | 12:00 pm | No. 20 Lafayette | No. 13 | Fitton Field; Worcester, MA | WCTR | W 28–26 | 5,291 | |
| November 21 | 1:00 pm | at Bucknell | No. 13 | Christy Mathewson–Memorial Stadium; Lewisburg, PA | | L 17–23 | 1,917 | |
| November 28 | 12:00 pm | at No. 2 Villanova* | No. 17 | Villanova Stadium; Villanova, PA (NCAA Division I First Round) | ESPN2 | L 28–38 | 4,319 | |
*Non-conference game; ^{†}Homecoming; Rankings from The Sports Network Poll released prior to the game; All times are in Eastern time
