= 2009 Dartmouth Big Green football team =

American college football season

2009 Dartmouth Big Green football
- Conference: Ivy League
- Record: 2–8 (2–5 Ivy)
- Head coach: Buddy Teevens (10th season)
- Captains: Tim McManus; Peter Pidermann
- Home stadium: Memorial Field

2009 Ivy League football standings
	Conf.			Overall
Team	W		L	W		L
No. 20 Penn $	7	–	0	8	–	2
Harvard	6	–	1	7	–	3
Brown	4	–	3	6	–	4
Columbia	3	–	4	4	–	6
Princeton	3	–	4	4	–	6
Yale	2	–	5	4	–	6
Dartmouth	2	–	5	2	–	8
Cornell	1	–	6	2	–	8
$ – Conference champion; Rankings from The Sports Network poll

The 2009 Dartmouth Big Green football team was an American football team that represented Dartmouth College during the 2009 NCAA Division I FCS football season. Dartmouth tied for second-to-last in the Ivy League. Dartmouth averaged 4,103 fans per game.

In their fifth consecutive year under head coach Eugene "Buddy" Teevens, his 10th year overall, the Big Green compiled a 2–8 record and were outscored 282 to 161. Tim McManus and Peter Pidermann were the team captains.

The Big Green's 2–5 conference record tied with Yale for sixth place in the Ivy League standings. Dartmouth was outscored 170 to 118 by Ivy opponents.

Dartmouth played its home games at Memorial Field on the college campus in Hanover, New Hampshire.

== Schedule ==
Date	Opponent	Site	Result	Attendance	Source
September 19	Colgate*	Memorial Field; Hanover, NH	L 15–34	5,073	
September 26	at No. 6 New Hampshire*	Cowell Stadium; Durham, NH (rivalry)	L 14–44	8,271	
October 3	Penn	Memorial Field; Hanover, NH	L 24–30	3,623	
October 10	at Yale	Yale Bowl; New Haven, CT	L 7–38	15,773	
October 17	at No. 25 Holy Cross*	Fitton Field; Worcester, MA	L 14–34	8,788	
October 24	Columbia^{†}	Memorial Field; Hanover, NH	W 28–6	3,816	
October 31	at Harvard	Harvard Stadium; Boston, MA (rivalry)	L 21–42	8,107	
November 7	Cornell	Memorial Field; Hanover, NH (rivalry)	W 20–17 ^{2OT}	3,706	
November 14	at Brown	Brown Stadium; Providence, RI	L 7–14 ^{OT}	4,410	
November 21	Princeton	Memorial Field; Hanover, NH	L 11–23	4,297	
*Non-conference game; ^{†}Homecoming; Rankings from The Sports Network Poll released prior to the game
