= 2009 Bucknell Bison football team =

American college football season

2009 Bucknell Bison football
- Conference: Patriot League
- Record: 4–7 (2–4 Patriot)
- Head coach: Tim Landis (7th season)
- Captains: Greg Jones; A.J. Kizekai; James Phelan
- Home stadium: Christy Mathewson–Memorial Stadium

2009 Patriot League football standings
	Conf.			Overall
Team	W		L	W		L
No. 14 Holy Cross $^	5	–	1	9	–	3
No. 21 Colgate	4	–	2	9	–	2
No. 24 Lafayette	4	–	2	8	–	3
Lehigh	4	–	2	4	–	7
Fordham	2	–	4	5	–	6
Bucknell	2	–	4	4	–	7
Georgetown	0	–	6	0	–	11
$ – Conference champion; ^ – FCS playoff participant; Rankings from The Sports Network poll

The 2009 Bucknell Bison football team was an American football team that represented Bucknell University during the 2009 NCAA Division I FCS football season. It tied for second-to-last in the Patriot League.

Bucknell played its home games at Christy Mathewson–Memorial Stadium on the university campus in Lewisburg, Pennsylvania.

In its seventh and final year under head coach Tim Landis, the Bison compiled a 4–7 record. Greg Jones, A.J. Kizekai and James Phelan were the team captains.

The Bison were outscored 260 to 162. Bucknell's 2–4 conference record tied with Fordham for fifth in the seven-team Patriot League standings.

== Schedule ==
Date	Opponent	Site	Result	Attendance	Source
September 5	at Duquesne*	Rooney Field; Pittsburgh, PA	L 19–24	1,867	
September 12	Robert Morris*	Christy Mathewson–Memorial Stadium; Lewisburg, PA	W 26–23	4,172	
September 19	at Cornell*	Schoellkopf Field; Ithaca, NY	L 9–33	9,889	
September 26	Marist*	Christy Mathewson–Memorial Stadium; Lewisburg, PA	W 17–16	4,896	
October 3	Georgetown	Christy Mathewson–Memorial Stadium; Lewisburg, PA	W 14–6		
October 10	at Penn*	Franklin Field; Philadelphia, PA	L 3–21	2,540	
October 24	Lehigh^{†}	Christy Mathewson–Memorial Stadium; Lewisburg, PA	L 16–35	2,246	
October 31	at Lafayette	Fisher Stadium; Easton, PA	L 14–35	5,549	
November 7	at Fordham	Coffey Field; Bronx, NY	L 7–21		
November 14	at No. 24 Colgate	Andy Kerr Stadium; Hamilton, NY	L 14–29		
November 21	No. 13 Holy Cross	Christy Mathewson–Memorial Stadium; Lewisburg, PA	W 23–17	1,917	
*Non-conference game; ^{†}Homecoming; ^ Parents Weekend; Rankings from The Sports Network Poll released prior to the game
