= 2009 Princeton Tigers football team =

American college football season

2009 Princeton Tigers football
- Conference: Ivy League
- Record: 4–6 (3–4 Ivy)
- Head coach: Roger Hughes (10th season)
- Defensive coordinator: Jared Backus (1st season)
- Captains: Scott Britton; Wilson Cates; Jordan Culbreath; Mark Paski
- Home stadium: Powers Field at Princeton Stadium

2009 Ivy League football standings
	Conf.			Overall
Team	W		L	W		L
No. 20 Penn $	7	–	0	8	–	2
Harvard	6	–	1	7	–	3
Brown	4	–	3	6	–	4
Columbia	3	–	4	4	–	6
Princeton	3	–	4	4	–	6
Yale	2	–	5	4	–	6
Dartmouth	2	–	5	2	–	8
Cornell	1	–	6	2	–	8
$ – Conference champion; Rankings from The Sports Network poll

The 2009 Princeton Tigers football team was an American football team that represented Princeton University during the 2009 NCAA Division I FCS football season. Princeton tied for fourth in the Ivy League.

In their tenth and final year under head coach Roger Hughes, the Tigers compiled a 4–6 record and were outscored 265 to 129. Scott Britton, Wilson Cates, Jordan Culbreath and Mark Paski were the team captains.

Princeton's 3–4 conference record tied with Dartmouth for fourth in the Ivy League standings. Princeton averaged 8,178 fans per game.The Tigers were outscored 192 to 91 by Ivy opponents.

The Tigers played their home games at Powers Field at Princeton Stadium, on the university campus in Princeton, New Jersey.

== Schedule ==
Date	Opponent	Site	Result	Attendance	Source
September 19	The Citadel*	Powers Field at Princeton Stadium; Princeton, NJ	L 7–38	7,885	
September 26	at Lehigh*	Goodman Stadium; Bethlehem, PA	W 17–14	8,168	
October 3	Columbia	Powers Field at Princeton Stadium; Princeton, NJ	L 0–38	10,738	
October 8	No. 23 Colgate*	Powers Field at Princeton Stadium; Princeton, NJ	L 14–21 ^{2OT}	5,685	
October 17	at Brown	Brown Stadium; Providence, RI	L 17–34	8,017	
October 24	at Harvard	Harvard Stadium; Boston, MA (rivalry)	L 3–37	13,565	
October 31	Cornell	Powers Field at Princeton Stadium; Princeton, NJ	W 17–14	7,100	
November 7	at Penn	Franklin Field; Philadelphia, PA (rivalry)	L 7–42	14,027	
November 14	Yale	Powers Field at Princeton Stadium; Princeton, NJ (rivalry)	W 24–17	9,483	
November 21	at Dartmouth	Memorial Field; Hanover, NH	W 23–11	4,297	
*Non-conference game; Rankings from The Sports Network Poll released prior to the game
