= 2009 Furman Paladins football team =

American college football season

2009 Furman Paladins football
- Conference: Southern Conference
- Record: 6–5 (5–3 SoCon)
- Head coach: Bobby Lamb (8th season)
- Captains: Justin Brown; Julian Hicks; Kyle McKinney; Jordan Sorrells; Chris Truss
- Home stadium: Paladin Stadium

2009 Southern Conference football standings
	Conf.			Overall
Team	W		L	W		L
No. 3 Appalachian State $^	8	–	0	11	–	3
No. 9 Elon ^	7	–	1	9	–	3
Furman	5	–	3	6	–	5
Chattanooga	4	–	4	6	–	5
Georgia Southern	4	–	4	5	–	6
Samford	3	–	5	5	–	6
Wofford	2	–	6	3	–	8
The Citadel	2	–	6	4	–	7
Western Carolina	1	–	7	2	–	9
$ – Conference champion; ^ – FCS playoff participant; Rankings from The Sports Network poll

The 2009 Furman Paladins football team was an American football team that represented Furman University as a member of the Southern Conference (SoCon) during the 2009 NCAA Division I FCS football season. In their eighth year under head coach Bobby Lamb, the Paladins compiled an overall record of 6–5 with a conference mark of 5–3, finishing third in the SoCon.

== Schedule ==
Date	Opponent	Site	Result	Attendance	Source
September 5	Presbyterian*	Paladin Stadium; Greenville, SC	W 45–21	10,960	
September 12	at Chattanooga	Finley Stadium; Chattanooga, TN	W 38–20	11,201	
September 19	at Missouri*	Faurot Field; Columbia, MO	L 12–52	61,617	
September 26	at Western Carolina	Whitmire Stadium; Cullowhee, NC	W 33–14	2,034	
October 3	No. 12 Elon	Paladin Stadium; Greenville, SC	L 12–19	12,412	
October 17	Samford	Paladin Stadium; Greenville, SC	W 26–24	10,846	
October 24	at The Citadel	Johnson Hagood Stadium; Charleston, SC (rivalry)	L 28–38	14,403	
October 31	No. 7 Appalachian State	Paladin Stadium; Greenville, SC	L 27–52	11,211	
November 7	at Auburn*	Jordan–Hare Stadium; Auburn, AL	L 31–63	81,506	
November 14	at Georgia Southern	Paulson Stadium; Statesboro, GA	W 30–22	17,922	
November 21	Wofford	Paladin Stadium; Greenville, SC (rivalry)	W 58–21	9,435	
*Non-conference game; Rankings from The Sports Network Poll released prior to the game
