= 2009 Cornell Big Red football team =

American college football season

2009 Cornell Big Red football
- Conference: Ivy League
- Record: 2–8 (1–6 Ivy)
- Head coach: Jim Knowles (6th season)
- Offensive coordinator: Bruce Barnum (3rd season)
- Offensive scheme: Pistol
- Defensive coordinator: Clayton Carlin (3rd season)
- Base defense: 4–3
- Captains: Horatio Blackman; Chris Costello
- Home stadium: Schoellkopf Field

2009 Ivy League football standings
	Conf.			Overall
Team	W		L	W		L
No. 20 Penn $	7	–	0	8	–	2
Harvard	6	–	1	7	–	3
Brown	4	–	3	6	–	4
Columbia	3	–	4	4	–	6
Princeton	3	–	4	4	–	6
Yale	2	–	5	4	–	6
Dartmouth	2	–	5	2	–	8
Cornell	1	–	6	2	–	8
$ – Conference champion; Rankings from The Sports Network poll

The 2009 Cornell Big Red football team was an American football team that represented Cornell University in the 2009 NCAA Division I FCS football season. They were led by sixth-year head coach Jim Knowles and played their home games at Schoellkopf Field. Cornell finished the season 2–8 overall and 1–6 in Ivy League play to place eighth. Cornell averaged 7,176 fans per game.

== Schedule ==
Date	Time	Opponent	Site	Result	Attendance	Source
September 19	12:30 p.m.	Bucknell*	Schoellkopf Field; Ithaca, NY	W 33–9	9,889	
September 26	12:00 p.m.	at Yale	Yale Bowl; New Haven, CT	W 14–12	17,654	
October 3	1:00 p.m.	at Colgate*	Andy Kerr Stadium; Hamilton, NY (rivalry)	L 23–45	7,123	
October 10	12:30 p.m.	Harvard	Schoellkopf Field; Ithaca, NY	L 10–28	8,053	
October 17	12:30 p.m.	Fordham*^{†}	Schoellkopf Field; Ithaca, NY	L 27–39	8,231	
October 24	12:30 p.m.	Brown	Schoellkopf Field; Ithaca, NY	L 14–34	5,117	
October 31	1:00 p.m.	at Princeton	Powers Field at Princeton Stadium; Princeton, NJ	L 13–17	7,100	
November 7	12:30 p.m.	at Dartmouth	Memorial Field; Hanover, NH (rivalry)	L 17–20 ^{OT}	3,706	
November 14	12:30 p.m.	Columbia	Schoellkopf Field; Ithaca, NY (rivalry)	L 20–30	4,593	
November 21	1:00 p.m.	at No. 24 Penn	Franklin Field; Philadelphia, PA (rivalry)	L 0–34	9,018	
*Non-conference game; ^{†}Homecoming; Rankings from The Sports Network Poll released prior to the game; All times are in Eastern time

== Roster ==
2009 Cornell Big Red football team roster
Players
Coaches
Offense

Pos.	#	Name	Class
WR	18	Bryan Walters	Sr
TE	87	J. C. Tretter	Fr

Defense

Pos.	#	Name	Class
S	22	Frank Morand	Sr

Special teams

Pos.	#	Name	Class

Head coach

- Jim Knowles

Coordinators/assistant coaches

Legend

- (C) Team captain
- (S) Suspended
- (I) Ineligible
- Injured
- Redshirt

Roster
