= 2009 Columbia Lions football team =

American college football season

2009 Columbia Lions football
- Conference: Ivy League
- Record: 4–6 (3–4 Ivy)
- Head coach: Norries Wilson (4th season)
- Offensive coordinator: Vinny Marino (4th season)
- Defensive coordinator: Aaron Kelton (2nd season)
- Captains: Alex Gross; Taylor Joseph; Austin Knowlin; Lou Miller; M.A. Olawale; John Seiler
- Home stadium: Robert K. Kraft Field at Lawrence A. Wien Stadium

2009 Ivy League football standings
	Conf.			Overall
Team	W		L	W		L
No. 20 Penn $	7	–	0	8	–	2
Harvard	6	–	1	7	–	3
Brown	4	–	3	6	–	4
Columbia	3	–	4	4	–	6
Princeton	3	–	4	4	–	6
Yale	2	–	5	4	–	6
Dartmouth	2	–	5	2	–	8
Cornell	1	–	6	2	–	8
$ – Conference champion; Rankings from The Sports Network poll

The 2009 Columbia Lions football team was an American football team that represented Columbia University during the 2009 NCAA Division I FCS football season. Columbia tied for fourth in the Ivy League. Columbia averaged 4,027 fans per game.

In their fourth season under head coach Norries Wilson, the Lions compiled a 4–6 record but outscored opponents 225 to 220. Alex Gross, Taylor Joseph, Austin Knowlin, Lou Miller, M.A. Olawale and John Seiler were the team captains.

The Lions' 3–4 conference record placed them in a tie with Princeton for fourth in the Ivy League standings. Columbia outscored Ivy opponents 151 to 146.

Columbia played its homes games at Robert K. Kraft Field at Lawrence A. Wien Stadium in Upper Manhattan, in New York City.

== Schedule ==
Date	Opponent	Site	Result	Attendance	Source
September 19	at Fordham*	Coffey Field; Bronx, NY (Liberty Cup)	W 40–28	6,449	
September 26	Central Connecticut*	Robert K. Kraft Field at Lawrence A. Wien Stadium; New York, NY	L 13–22	3,089	
October 3	at Princeton	Powers Field at Princeton Stadium; Princeton, NJ	W 38–0	10,738	
October 10	at Lafayette*	Fisher Stadium; Easton, PA	L 21–24	5,843	
October 17	Penn^{†}	Robert K. Kraft Field at Lawrence A. Wien Stadium; New York, NY	L 13–27	7,301	
October 24	at Dartmouth	Memorial Field; Hanover, NH	L 6–28		
October 31	Yale	Robert K. Kraft Field at Lawrence A. Wien Stadium; New York, NY	L 22–23	2,461	
November 7	Harvard	Robert K. Kraft Field at Lawrence A. Wien Stadium; New York, NY	L 14–34	2,896	
November 14	at Cornell	Schoellkopf Field; Ithaca, NY (rivalry)	W 30–20	4,593	
November 21	Brown	Robert K. Kraft Field at Lawrence A. Wien Stadium; New York, NY	W 28–14	4,390	
*Non-conference game; ^{†}Homecoming
