= 2009 Chattanooga Mocs football team =

American college football season

2009 Chattanooga Mocs football
- Conference: Southern Conference
- Record: 6–5 (4–4 SoCon)
- Head coach: Russ Huesman (1st season)
- Co-offensive coordinators: Carmen Felus (4th season); Marcus Satterfield (1st season)
- Defensive coordinator: Adam Fuller (1st season)
- Home stadium: Finley Stadium

2009 Southern Conference football standings
	Conf.			Overall
Team	W		L	W		L
No. 3 Appalachian State $^	8	–	0	11	–	3
No. 9 Elon ^	7	–	1	9	–	3
Furman	5	–	3	6	–	5
Chattanooga	4	–	4	6	–	5
Georgia Southern	4	–	4	5	–	6
Samford	3	–	5	5	–	6
Wofford	2	–	6	3	–	8
The Citadel	2	–	6	4	–	7
Western Carolina	1	–	7	2	–	9
$ – Conference champion; ^ – FCS playoff participant; Rankings from The Sports Network poll

The 2009 Chattanooga Mocs football team represented the University of Tennessee at Chattanooga as a member of the Southern Conference (SoCon) in the 2009 NCAA Division I FCS football season. The Mocs were led by first-year head coach Russ Huesman and played their home games at Finley Stadium. They finished the season 6–5 overall and 4–4 in SoCon play to place fourth.

== Schedule ==
Date	Time	Opponent	Site	Result	Attendance	Source
September 3	7:00 pm	No. 21 (D-II) Glenville State*	Finley Stadium; Chattanooga, TN	W 30–13	14,002	
September 12	6:00 pm	Furman	Finley Stadium; Chattanooga, TN	L 20–38	11,201	
September 19	1:30 pm	at Presbyterian*	Bailey Memorial Stadium; Clinton, SC	W 29–13	2,951	
September 26	6:00 pm	No. 17 Wofford^{†}	Finley Stadium; Chattanooga, TN	W 38–9	8,452	
October 10	3:00 pm	at Samford	Seibert Stadium; Homewood, AL	W 14–7	6,393	
October 17	6:00 pm	at Georgia Southern	Paulson Stadium; Statesboro, GA	L 20–30	17,357	
October 24	1:30 pm	at No. 7 Elon	Rhodes Stadium; Elon, NC	L 10–45	8,264	
October 31	2:00 pm	Western Carolina	Finley Stadium; Chattanooga, TN	W 24–20	9,320	
November 7	1:00 pm	at No. 7 Appalachian State	Kidd Brewer Stadium; Boone, NC	L 20–35	24,430	
November 14	2:00 pm	The Citadel	Finley Stadium; Chattanooga, TN	W 31–28	9,540	
November 21	11:20 am	at No. 2 (FBS) Alabama*	Bryant–Denny Stadium; Tuscaloosa, AL	L 0–45	92,012	
*Non-conference game; ^{†}Homecoming; Rankings from The Sports Network Poll released prior to the game; All times are in Eastern time
