= 2009 The Citadel Bulldogs football team =

American college football season

2009 The Citadel Bulldogs football
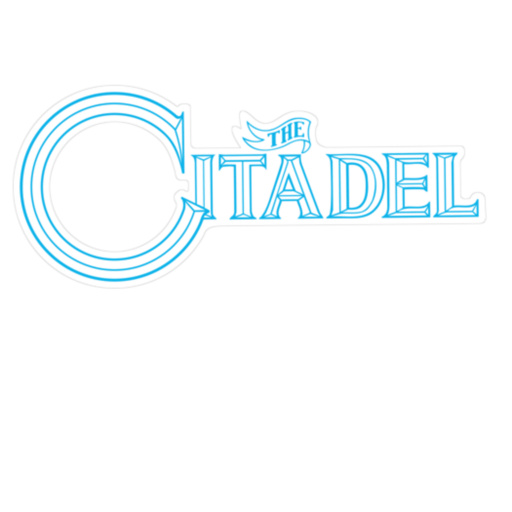
- Conference: Southern Conference
- Record: 4–7 (2–6 SoCon)
- Head coach: Kevin Higgins (5th season)
- Offensive coordinator: Dave Cecchini (3rd season)
- Defensive coordinator: Isaac Collins (4th season)
- Home stadium: Johnson Hagood Stadium

2009 Southern Conference football standings
	Conf.			Overall
Team	W		L	W		L
No. 3 Appalachian State $^	8	–	0	11	–	3
No. 9 Elon ^	7	–	1	9	–	3
Furman	5	–	3	6	–	5
Chattanooga	4	–	4	6	–	5
Georgia Southern	4	–	4	5	–	6
Samford	3	–	5	5	–	6
Wofford	2	–	6	3	–	8
The Citadel	2	–	6	4	–	7
Western Carolina	1	–	7	2	–	9
$ – Conference champion; ^ – FCS playoff participant; Rankings from The Sports Network poll

The 2009 The Citadel Bulldogs football team represented The Citadel, The Military College of South Carolina in the 2009 NCAA Division I FCS football season. The Bulldogs were led by fifth year head coach Kevin Higgins and played their home games at Johnson Hagood Stadium. They played as members of the Southern Conference, as they have since 1936.

== Schedule ==
Date	Time	Opponent	Site	TV	Result	Attendance	Source
September 5	6:00 pm	at No. 20 (FBS) North Carolina*	Kenan Memorial Stadium; Chapel Hill, NC	ESPN360	L 6–40	58,500	
September 19	3:00 pm	at Princeton*	Powers Field at Princeton Stadium; Princeton, NJ		W 38–7	7,885	
September 26	7:00 pm	Presbyterian*	Johnson Hagood Stadium; Charleston, SC	BI	W 46–21	13,034	
October 3	1:00 pm	No. 10 Appalachian State	Johnson Hagood Stadium; Charleston, SC	BI	L 27–30 ^{OT}	14,238	
October 10	1:30 pm	at No. 10 Elon	Rhodes Stadium; Elon, NC		L 7–43	7,524	
October 17	4:00 pm	at Western Carolina	E. J. Whitmire Stadium; Cullowhee, NC	SCTV	L 10–14	6,821	
October 24	2:00 pm	Furman	Johnson Hagood Stadium; Charleston, SC (rivalry)	BI	W 38–28	14,403	
October 31	1:00 pm	Samford	Johnson Hagood Stadium; Charleston, SC	BI	W 28–16	8,317	
November 7	3:05 pm	Wofford^{†}	Johnson Hagood Stadium; Charleston, SC (rivalry)	SSN	L 17–43	15,155	
November 14	2:05 pm	at Chattanooga	Finley Stadium; Chattanooga, TN		L 28–31	9,540	
November 21	2:00 pm	at Georgia Southern	Paulson Stadium; Statesboro, GA		L 6–13	12,611	
*Non-conference game; ^{†}Homecoming; Rankings from The Sports Network Poll released prior to the game; All times are in Eastern time
