= 2009 Appalachian State Mountaineers football team =

American college football season

2009 Appalachian State Mountaineers football

SoCon champion

NCAA Division I Semifinal, L 17–24 vs. Montana
- Conference: Southern Conference

Ranking
- Sports Network: No. 3
- FCS Coaches: No. 3
- Record: 11–3 (8–0 Southern)
- Head coach: Jerry Moore (21st season)
- Offensive coordinator: Collaborative
- Offensive scheme: Multiple spread
- Defensive coordinator: John Wiley (19th season)
- Base defense: 4–3
- Home stadium: Kidd Brewer Stadium

2009 Southern Conference football standings
| | Conf. | | | Overall |
| Team | W | | L | W | | L |
|---|---|---|---|---|---|---|
| No. 3 Appalachian State $^ | 8 | – | 0 | 11 | – | 3 |
| No. 9 Elon ^ | 7 | – | 1 | 9 | – | 3 |
| Furman | 5 | – | 3 | 6 | – | 5 |
| Chattanooga | 4 | – | 4 | 6 | – | 5 |
| Georgia Southern | 4 | – | 4 | 5 | – | 6 |
| Samford | 3 | – | 5 | 5 | – | 6 |
| Wofford | 2 | – | 6 | 3 | – | 8 |
| The Citadel | 2 | – | 6 | 4 | – | 7 |
| Western Carolina | 1 | – | 7 | 2 | – | 9 |
$ – Conference champion; ^ – FCS playoff participant; Rankings from The Sports Network poll

The 2009 Appalachian State Mountaineers football team represented Appalachian State University in the 2009 NCAA Division I FCS football season. It was the 80th season of play for the Mountaineers. The team was led by Jerry Moore, the 2006 Eddie Robinson Award winner for Coach of the Year. Moore is in his 21st season as head coach. The Mountaineers played their home games at Kidd Brewer Stadium in Boone, North Carolina.

== Schedule ==
| Date | Time | Opponent | Rank | Site | TV | Result | Attendance | Source |
|---|---|---|---|---|---|---|---|---|
| September 5 | 12:00 p.m. | at East Carolina* | No. 1 | Dowdy–Ficklen Stadium; Greenville, NC | MASN | L 24–29 | 43,279 | |
| September 12 | 3:30 p.m. | No. 16 McNeese State* | No. 2 | Kidd Brewer Stadium; Boone, NC | | L 35–40 | 27,914 | |
| September 26 | 3:30 p.m. | Samford | No. 10 | Kidd Brewer Stadium; Boone, NC | | W 20–7 | 22,139 | |
| October 3 | 1:00 p.m. | at The Citadel | No. 10 | Johnson Hagood Stadium; Charleston, SC | | W 30–27 ^{OT} | 14,238 | |
| October 10 | 3:30 p.m. | North Carolina Central*^{†} | No. 9 | Kidd Brewer Stadium; Boone, NC | | W 55–21 | 25,017 | |
| October 17 | 3:00 p.m. | at Wofford | No. 9 | Gibbs Stadium; Spartanburg, SC | SportSouth | W 44–34 | 8,330 | |
| October 24 | 3:00 p.m. | Georgia Southern | No. 8 | Kidd Brewer Stadium; Boone, NC (Black Saturday, rivalry) | SportSouth | W 52–16 | 26,215 | |
| October 31 | 12:00 p.m. | at Furman | No. 7 | Paladin Stadium; Greenville, SC | WLOS | W 52–27 | 11,211 | |
| November 7 | 3:30 p.m. | Chattanooga | No. 7 | Kidd Brewer Stadium; Boone, NC | | W 35–20 | 24,430 | |
| November 14 | 3:00 p.m. | at No. 6 Elon | No. 7 | Rhodes Stadium; Elon, NC | SportSouth | W 27–10 | 14,167 | |
| November 21 | 3:30 p.m. | Western Carolina | No. 6 | Kidd Brewer Stadium; Boone, NC (Battle for the Old Mountain Jug) | | W 19–14 | 30,098 | |
| November 28 | 12:00 p.m. | No. 7 South Carolina State* | No. 5 | Kidd Brewer Stadium; Boone, NC (NCAA Division I First Round) | ESPNU | W 20–13 | 12,216 | |
| December 5 | 7:00 p.m. | at No. 4 Richmond* | No. 5 | University of Richmond Stadium; Richmond, VA (NCAA Division I Quarterfinal) | MASN | W 35–31 | 7,272 | |
| December 12 | 4:00 p.m. | at No. 3 Montana* | No. 5 | Washington–Grizzly Stadium; Missoula, MT (NCAA Division I Semifinal) | ESPN | L 17–24 | 24,207 | |
*Non-conference game; ^{†}Homecoming; Rankings from The Sports Network Poll released prior to the game; All times are in Eastern time

== Game summaries ==
=== East Carolina ===
| | 1 | 2 | 3 | 4 | Total |
|---|---|---|---|---|---|
| Appalachian State | 0 | 7 | 0 | 17 | 24 |
| East Carolina | 17 | 10 | 2 | 0 | 29 |

=== McNeese State ===
| | 1 | 2 | 3 | 4 | Total |
|---|---|---|---|---|---|
| McNeese State | 7 | 7 | 13 | 13 | 40 |
| Appalachian State | 0 | 7 | 21 | 7 | 35 |

=== Samford ===
| | 1 | 2 | 3 | 4 | Total |
|---|---|---|---|---|---|
| Samford | 0 | 0 | 0 | 7 | 7 |
| Appalachian State | 7 | 13 | 0 | 0 | 20 |

=== The Citadel ===
| | 1 | 2 | 3 | 4 | OT | Total |
|---|---|---|---|---|---|---|
| Appalachian State | 0 | 7 | 10 | 10 | 3 | 30 |
| The Citadel | 7 | 6 | 0 | 14 | 0 | 27 |

=== North Carolina Central ===
| | 1 | 2 | 3 | 4 | Total |
|---|---|---|---|---|---|
| North Carolina Central | 14 | 0 | 0 | 7 | 21 |
| Appalachian State | 7 | 17 | 10 | 21 | 55 |

=== Wofford ===
| | 1 | 2 | 3 | 4 | Total |
|---|---|---|---|---|---|
| Appalachian State | 3 | 17 | 7 | 17 | 44 |
| Wofford | 6 | 21 | 7 | 0 | 34 |

=== Georgia Southern ===
| | 1 | 2 | 3 | 4 | Total |
|---|---|---|---|---|---|
| Georgia Southern | 7 | 3 | 6 | 0 | 16 |
| Appalachian State | 14 | 21 | 10 | 7 | 52 |

=== Furman ===
| | 1 | 2 | 3 | 4 | Total |
|---|---|---|---|---|---|
| Appalachian State | 14 | 21 | 17 | 0 | 52 |
| Furman | 0 | 13 | 14 | 0 | 27 |

=== Chattanooga ===
| | 1 | 2 | 3 | 4 | Total |
|---|---|---|---|---|---|
| Chattanooga | 0 | 7 | 10 | 3 | 20 |
| Appalachian State | 21 | 0 | 0 | 14 | 35 |

=== Elon ===
| | 1 | 2 | 3 | 4 | Total |
|---|---|---|---|---|---|
| Appalachian State | 14 | 7 | 3 | 3 | 27 |
| Elon | 0 | 0 | 3 | 7 | 10 |

=== Western Carolina ===
| | 1 | 2 | 3 | 4 | Total |
|---|---|---|---|---|---|
| Western Carolina | 7 | 0 | 0 | 7 | 14 |
| Appalachian State | 3 | 0 | 7 | 9 | 19 |

=== South Carolina State ===
| | 1 | 2 | 3 | 4 | Total |
|---|---|---|---|---|---|
| South Carolina State | 3 | 7 | 3 | 0 | 13 |
| Appalachian State | 0 | 13 | 0 | 7 | 20 |

=== Richmond ===
| | 1 | 2 | 3 | 4 | Total |
|---|---|---|---|---|---|
| Appalachian State | 7 | 0 | 7 | 21 | 35 |
| Richmond | 7 | 7 | 7 | 10 | 31 |

=== Montana ===
| | 1 | 2 | 3 | 4 | Total |
|---|---|---|---|---|---|
| Appalachian State | 0 | 10 | 7 | 0 | 17 |
| Montana | 7 | 0 | 7 | 10 | 24 |

== Roster ==
2009 Appalachian State Mountaineers football team roster
Players
Coaches
Offense

| Pos. | # | Name | Class |
|---|---|---|---|
| WR | 2 | DeAndre Presley | So |
| WR | 3 | Blake Elder | Jr |
| RB | 4 | Rod Chisholm | Fr |
| WR | 6 | CoCo Hillary | Jr |
| QB | 7 | Travaris Cadet | So |
| WR | 8 | Brian Quick | So |
| WR | 11 | Andrew Peacock | Fr |
| QB | 12 | Jamal Jackson | Fr |
| QB | 14 | Armanti Edwards | Sr |
| WR | 15 | Jamill Lott | Fr |
| RB | 16 | Devin Radford | Jr |
| WR | 17 | Matt Cline | Jr |
| WR | 19 | Tavaris Washington | Sr |
| RB | 20 | Devon Moore | Jr |
| RB | 21 | Robert Welton | Jr |
| RB | 26 | Josh Jackson | Sr |
| WR | 27 | Tony Washington | Fr |
| RB | 29 | Cedric Baker | So |
| TE | 37 | Jey Yokeley | Fr |
| TE | 43 | Brandon Thompson | So |
| TE | 48 | Brad Hardee | Jr |
| OL | 51 | Sherman Holt | So |
| OL | 57 | Brett Irvin | Jr |
| OL | 60 | Louis Swaba | Jr |
| OL | 61 | Mario Acitelli | Sr |
| OL | 62 | Xan Thomas | So |
| OL | 63 | Daniel Kilgore | Jr |
| OL | 64 | Orry Frye | So |
| OL | 66 | Chad Turner | Fr |
| OL | 67 | Zach Brown | Sr |
| OL | 68 | Robert Wallace | Fr |
| OL | 70 | Matt Ruff | So |
| OL | 71 | Pat Mills | Jr |
| OL | 73 | Corbett Harris | Jr |
| OL | 75 | Regan Dufort | Fr |
| OL | 76 | Anthony Wilson | So |
| OL | 77 | Jason Jones | So |
| OL | 78 | Chris Marshall | So |
| WR | 80 | Ben King | So |
| TE | 81 | Jordan Gary | Fr |
| WR | 82 | Rodger Walker | Fr |
| WR | 83 | Dominick Magazu | So |
| TE | 84 | Ben Jorden | So |
| WR | 85 | B. J. Frazier | Jr |
| TE | 86 | Tim Frye | Jr |
| WR | 87 | Wes Springfield | Fr |
| WR | 89 | Nathan Dorton | Fr |
| WR | 97 | Levi Pate | Fr |
| WR | | Jarrett Barnett | Fr |
| WR | | R. J. Burton | So |
| OL | | Blake Hart | Fr |
| WR | | Travis Lucas | Jr |
| RB | | Baine Martin | Fr |
| WR | | Jonathan Shively | Fr |
| OL | | Bradley Williams | Fr |

Defense

| Pos. | # | Name | Class |
|---|---|---|---|
| DB | 5 | Cortez Gilbert | Sr |
| LB | 9 | D. J. Smith | Jr |
| DB | 10 | Demetrius McCray | Fr |
| DB | 13 | Mark LeGree | Jr |
| DB | 18 | Dominique McDuffie | Fr |
| DB | 22 | Ingram Bell | Fr |
| LB | 24 | Brandon Grier | Fr |
| DB | 25 | Jared Reine | Jr |
| DB | 28 | Ed Gainey | So |
| LB | 30 | Brandon Olsen | So |
| DB | 31 | Troy Sanders | Fr |
| LB | 33 | Jeremy Kimbrough | Fr |
| LB | 35 | Philip Strickland | So |
| LB | 36 | Justin Lloyd | Fr |
| LB | 40 | Jacque Roman | Sr |
| LB | 41 | Zac Baker | Fr |
| LB | 42 | Michael Frazier | Fr |
| LB | 45 | Karl Anderson | Fr |
| DL | 46 | Tony Robertson | Jr |
| DB | 47 | Justin Wray | Fr |
| LB | 49 | Terrence McLean | Fr |
| LB | 50 | Cougar Norris | Fr |
| DL | 52 | Demery Brewer | So |
| DL | 53 | Mark Moll | Fr |
| DL | 54 | Jabari Fletcher | Jr |
| DL | 55 | Justin Johnson | Sr |
| DL | 56 | Bobby Bozzo | Jr |
| DL | 58 | Daniel Finnerty | Sr |
| LB | 65 | Matthew Watson | Fr |
| DL | 91 | Malcolm Bennett | Sr |
| DL | 92 | Nick Canepa | Fr |
| DL | 93 | John Rizor | Fr |
| DL | 94 | Giavonni Scott | Fr |
| DL | 95 | Gordy Witte | So |
| DL | 96 | Josh Jurius | So |
| DL | 98 | Anthony Williams | Sr |
| DL | 99 | Lanston Tanyi | So |
| DB | | Austin Crabill | Fr |
| DB | | Michael Marsh | Fr |
| LB | | Michael Rudisill | Fr |

Special teams

| Pos. | # | Name | Class |
|---|---|---|---|
| P | 34 | Adam Kassouf | Sr |
| PK | 39 | Jason Vitaris | Jr |
| LS | 59 | Wilson Fitchett | So |
| LS | 79 | Dakota Walker | Fr |
| P | 90 | Sam Martin | Fr |
| LS | | Alex Johnson | Fr |
| PK | | Stewart Johnson | Fr |
| PK | | Ethan Martin | Fr |
| P | | Michael McLendon | Fr |

Head coach

- Jerry Moore (21st season)

Coordinators/assistant coaches

- John Wiley - Defensive coordinator
- Chris Moore
- Dale Jones
- Shawn Elliott
- Mark Speir
- Brad Glenn
- John Holt
- Jason Blalock
- Lance Taylor
- Josh Robertson

Legend

- (C) Team captain
- (S) Suspended
- (I) Ineligible
- Injured
- Redshirt

Roster
Last update: November 30, 2009

== Coaching staff ==
| Name | Position | Alma Mater | Year |
|---|---|---|---|
| Jerry Moore | Head coach | Baylor, 1961 | 21st |
| John Wiley | Defensive coordinator/defensive Backs | East Texas State, 1984 | 19th |
| Chris Moore | Running backs | Appalachian State, 1999 | 15th |
| Dale Jones | Linebackers | Tennessee, 1988 | 14th |
| Shawn Elliott | Offensive line | Appalachian State, 1996 | 13th |
| Mark Speir | Defensive line/recruiting coordinator | Clemson, 1990 | 7th |
| Brad Glenn | Quarterbacks | Clemson, 1995 | 5th |
| John Holt | Tight ends | Appalachian State, 2008 | 2nd |
| Jason Blalock | Defensive tackles | Appalachian State, 2001 | 1st |
| Lance Taylor | Wide receivers | Alabama, 2004 | 1st |
| Josh Robertson | Strength & conditioning | ETSU, 1997 | 4th |

Coach profiles at GoASU

== Rankings ==
Ranking movements Legend: ██ Increase in ranking ██ Decrease in ranking
| | Week | | | | | | | | | | | | | |
| Poll | Pre | 1 | 2 | 3 | 4 | 5 | 6 | 7 | 8 | 9 | 10 | 11 | 12 | Final |
|---|---|---|---|---|---|---|---|---|---|---|---|---|---|---|
| The Sports Network | 1 | 2 | 10 | 10 | 10 | 9 | 9 | 8 | 7 | 7 | 7 | 6 | 5 | 3 |
| FCS Coaches | 1 | 2 | 9 | 10 | 10 | 10 | 10 | 9 | 8 | 8 | 8 | 6 | 5 | 3 |

== Awards and honors ==
- Walter Payton Award — Armanti Edwards
- Southern Conference Coach of the Year (coaches) — Jerry Moore
- Southern Conference Roy M. "Legs" Hawley Offensive Player of the Year (media) — Armanti Edwards
- Southern Conference Offensive Player of the Year (coaches) — Armanti Edwards
- Southern Conference Jacobs Blocking Trophy — Mario Acitelli

== Statistics ==
=== Team ===
| | ASU | Opp |
|---|---|---|
| Scoring | 465 | 313 |
| Points per game | 33.2 | 22.4 |
| First downs | 343 | 241 |
| Rushing | 168 | 108 |
| Passing | 160 | 117 |
| Penalty | 15 | 16 |
| Total offense | 6,511 | 4,458 |
| Avg per play | 6.4 | 5.0 |
| Avg per game | 465.1 | 318.4 |
| Fumbles–Lost | 19–9 | 16–7 |
| Penalties–Yards | 99–936 | 72–628 |
| Avg per game | 66.9 | 44.9 |

| | ASU | Opp |
|---|---|---|
| Punts–Yards | 52–2,080 | 78–3,185 |
| Avg per punt | 40.0 | 40.8 |
| Time of possession/Game | 30:43 | 29:17 |
| 3rd down conversions | 80 for 182 | 76 for 197 |
| 4th down conversions | 8 for 18 | 10 for 19 |
| Touchdowns scored | 58 | 39 |
| Field goals–Attempts | 19–28 | 13–19 |
| PAT–Attempts | 58–58 | 34–6 |
| Attendance | 168,029 | 122,704 |
| Games/Avg per Game | 7/24,004 | 7/17,529 |

==== Scores by quarter ====
| | 1 | 2 | 3 | 4 | OT | Total |
|---|---|---|---|---|---|---|
| Opponents | 82 | 81 | 72 | 78 | 0 | 313 |
| Mountaineers | 90 | 140 | 99 | 133 | 3 | 465 |
