= 2009 Colgate Raiders football team =

American college football season

2009 Colgate Raiders football
- Conference: Patriot League

Ranking
- Sports Network: No. 21
- FCS Coaches: No. 20
- Record: 9–2 (4–2 Patriot)
- Head coach: Dick Biddle (14th season)
- Defensive coordinator: Nick Monroe (1st season)
- Captain: Pat Simonds
- Home stadium: Andy Kerr Stadium

2009 Patriot League football standings
	Conf.			Overall
Team	W		L	W		L
No. 14 Holy Cross $^	5	–	1	9	–	3
No. 21 Colgate	4	–	2	9	–	2
No. 24 Lafayette	4	–	2	8	–	3
Lehigh	4	–	2	4	–	7
Fordham	2	–	4	5	–	6
Bucknell	2	–	4	4	–	7
Georgetown	0	–	6	0	–	11
$ – Conference champion; ^ – FCS playoff participant; Rankings from The Sports Network poll

The 2009 Colgate Raiders football team was an American football team that represented Colgate University during the 2009 NCAA Division I FCS football season. Colgate tied for second in the Patriot League.

In its 14th season under head coach Dick Biddle, the team compiled a 9–2 record. Pat Simonds was the team captains.

The Raiders outscored opponents 342 to 246. Colgate's 4–2 conference record placed it in a three-way tie with Lafayette and Lehigh for second in the Patriot League standings.

Despite tying for second place, Colgate had the best overall record among Patriot League teams, sweeping its non-league opponents. A seven-game win streak to start the season saw the team enter the weekly national rankings at No. 25 at the end of September, rising as high as No. 17 before settling at No. 21 in the final poll of the year. The Raiders did not qualify for the FCS playoffs.

Colgate played its home games at Andy Kerr Stadium in Hamilton, New York.

== Schedule ==
Date	Opponent	Rank	Site	Result	Attendance	Source
September 5	Monmouth*		Andy Kerr Stadium; Hamilton, NY	W 35–23	5,263	
September 12	Stony Brook*		Andy Kerr Stadium; Hamilton, NY	W 23–13	3,122	
September 19	at Dartmouth*		Memorial Field; Hanover, NH	W 34–15		
September 26	Fordham		Andy Kerr Stadium; Hamilton, NY	W 20–12	4,000	
October 3	at Cornell^{†}*	No. 25	Schoellkopf Field; Ithaca, NY (rivalry)	W 45–23	7,123	
October 8	at Princeton*	No. 23	Powers Field at Princeton Stadium; Princeton, NJ	W 21–14 ^{OT}	5,685	
October 17	at Georgetown	No. 17	Multi-Sport Field; Washington, DC	W 31–14		
October 24	at No. 22 Holy Cross	No. 17	Fitton Field; Worcester, MA	L 28–42	2,246	
October 31	Lehigh	No. 24	Andy Kerr Stadium; Hamilton, NY	W 27–20		
November 7	at No. 25 Lafayette	No. 18	Fisher Stadium; Easton, PA	L 49–56	8,937	
November 14	Bucknell	No. 24	Andy Kerr Stadium; Hamilton, NY	W 29–14		
*Non-conference game; ^{†}Homecoming; Rankings from The Sports Network Poll released prior to the game
