= 2009 Coastal Carolina Chanticleers football team =

American college football season

2009 Coastal Carolina Chanticleers football
- Conference: Big South Conference
- Record: 5–6 (3–3 Big South)
- Head coach: David Bennett (7th season)
- Offensive coordinator: Kevin Brown (1st season)
- Offensive scheme: Multiple
- Defensive coordinator: Curtis Walker (7th season)
- Base defense: 4–3
- Home stadium: Brooks Stadium

2009 Big South Conference football standings
	Conf.			Overall
Team	W		L	W		L
No. 22 Liberty +	5	–	1	8	–	3
Stony Brook +	5	–	1	6	–	5
Charleston Southern	4	–	2	6	–	5
Gardner–Webb	3	–	3	6	–	5
Coastal Carolina	3	–	3	5	–	6
VMI	1	–	5	2	–	9
Presbyterian	0	–	6	0	–	11
+ – Conference co-champions; Rankings from The Sports Network poll

The 2009 Coastal Carolina Chanticleers football team represented Coastal Carolina University as a member of the Big South Conference during the 2009 NCAA Division I FCS football season. Led by seventh-year head coach David Bennett, the Chanticleers compiled an overall record of 5–6 with a mark of 3–3 in conference play, tying for fourth place the Big South. Coastal Carolina played home games at Brooks Stadium in Conway, South Carolina.

== Schedule ==
Date	Time	Opponent	Site	Result	Attendance	Source
September 3	7:00 p.m.	at Kent State*	Dix Stadium; Kent, OH	L 0–18	16,481	
September 12	12:00 p.m.	Monmouth*	Brooks Stadium; Conway, SC	W 24–17	6,817	
September 19	7:00 p.m.	at Towson*	Unitas Stadium; Towson, MD	L 17–21	7,628	
September 26	7:00 p.m.	North Carolina A&T*	Brooks Stadium; Conway, SC	W 28–7	7,367	
October 10	7:00 p.m.	VMI	Brooks Stadium; Conway, SC	W 20–6	6,506	
October 17	3:30 p.m.	at Liberty	Williams Stadium; Lynchburg, VA (rivalry)	L 13–58	14,371	
October 24	3:30 p.m.	at Stony Brook	LaValle Stadium; Stony Brook, NY	L 10–16	3,292	
October 31	1:30 p.m.	at Clemson*	Memorial Stadium; Clemson, SC	L 3–49	74,429	
November 7	12:30 p.m.	Gardner–Webb	Brooks Stadium; Conway, SC	W 26–21	5,797	
November 14	12:30 p.m.	Presbyterian	Brooks Stadium; Conway, SC	W 41–37	5,207	
November 21	1:30 p.m.	at Charleston Southern	Buccaneer Field; North Charleston, SC	L 23–30	2,914	
*Non-conference game; All times are in Eastern time
