= 2009 Brown Bears football team =

American college football season

2009 Brown Bears football
- Conference: Ivy League
- Record: 6–4 (4–3 Ivy)
- Head coach: Phil Estes (12th season)
- Offensive coordinator: Frank Sheehan (4th season)
- Offensive scheme: Pro-style
- Defensive coordinator: Michael Kelleher (9th season)
- Base defense: 4–3
- Captains: James Devlin; Paul Jasinowski
- Home stadium: Brown Stadium

2009 Ivy League football standings
	Conf.			Overall
Team	W		L	W		L
No. 20 Penn $	7	–	0	8	–	2
Harvard	6	–	1	7	–	3
Brown	4	–	3	6	–	4
Columbia	3	–	4	4	–	6
Princeton	3	–	4	4	–	6
Yale	2	–	5	4	–	6
Dartmouth	2	–	5	2	–	8
Cornell	1	–	6	2	–	8
$ – Conference champion; Rankings from The Sports Network poll

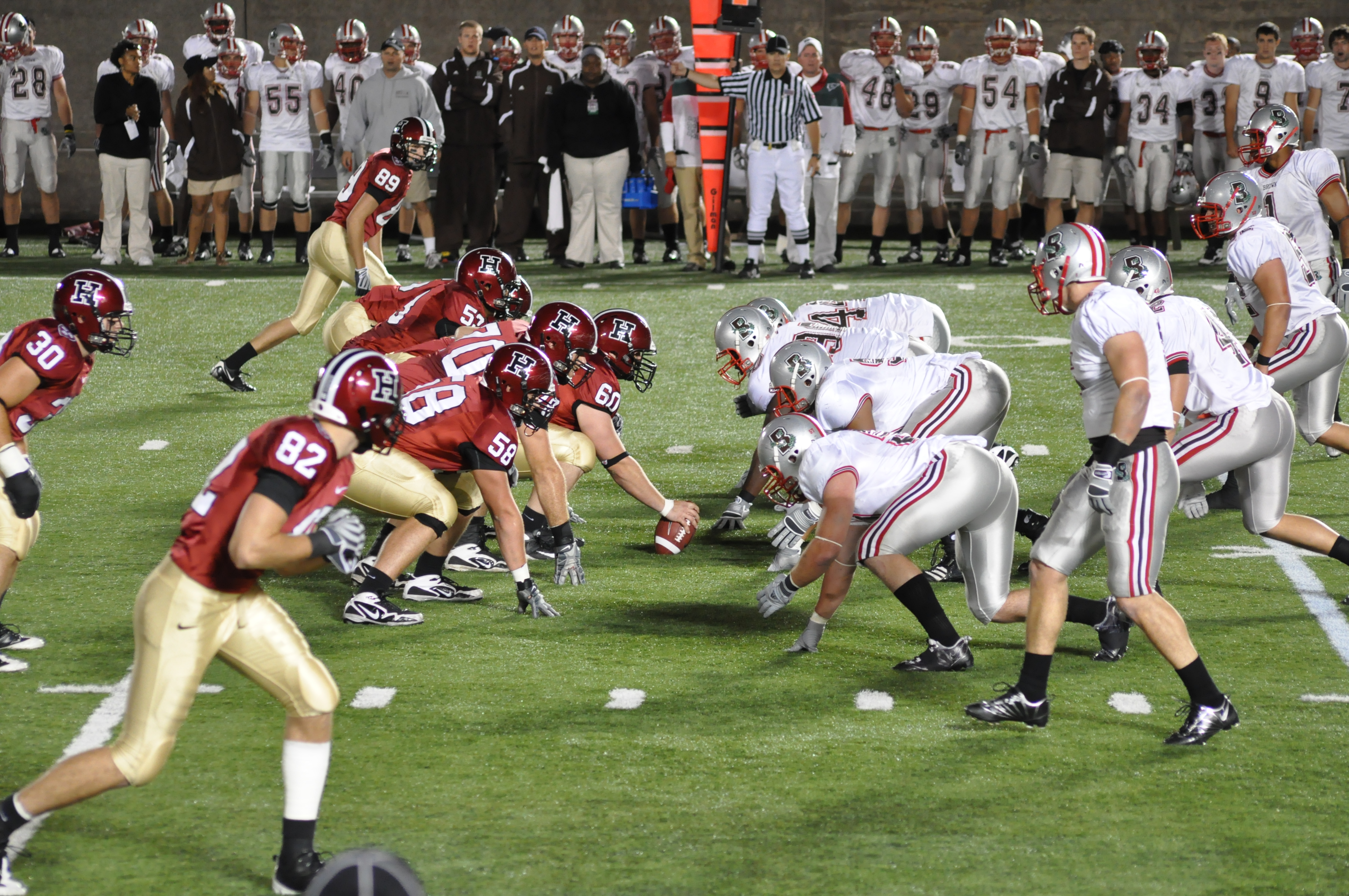
Brown vs. Harvard

The 2009 Brown Bears football team was an American football team that represented Brown University during the 2009 NCAA Division I FCS football season. Brown finished third in the Ivy League. Brown averaged 6,033 fans per game.

In their 13th season under head coach Phil Estes, the Bears compiled a 6–4 record and outscored opponents 241 to 197. James Devlin and Paul Jasinowski were the team captains.

The Bears' 4–3 conference record placed third in the Ivy League standings. They outscored Ivy opponents 159 to 125.

Brown played its home games at Brown Stadium in Providence, Rhode Island.

== Schedule ==
Date	Opponent	Site	Result	Attendance	Source
September 19	Stony Brook*	Kenneth P. LaValle Stadium; Stony Brook, New York	L 20–21	5,709	
September 25	at Harvard	Harvard Stadium; Boston, MA	L 21–24	17,263	
October 3	Rhode Island*	Brown Stadium; Providence, RI (rivalry)	W 28–20	3,214	
October 10	No. 19 Holy Cross*	Brown Stadium; Providence, RI	W 33–31	5,110	
October 17	Princeton	Brown Stadium; Providence, RI	W 34–17	8,017	
October 24	at Cornell	Schoellkopf Field; Ithaca, NY	W 34–14	5,117	
October 31	Penn	Brown Stadium; Providence, RI	L 7–14	9,417	
November 7	at Yale	Yale Bowl; New Haven, CT	W 35–21	16,228	
November 14	Dartmouth	Brown Stadium; Providence, RI	W 14–7	4,410	
November 21	at Columbia	Robert K. Kraft Field at Lawrence A. Wien Stadium; New York, NY	L 14–28	4,390	
*Non-conference game; Rankings from The Sports Network Poll released prior to the game
