= 2009 Western Carolina Catamounts football team =

American college football season

2009 Western Carolina Catamounts football
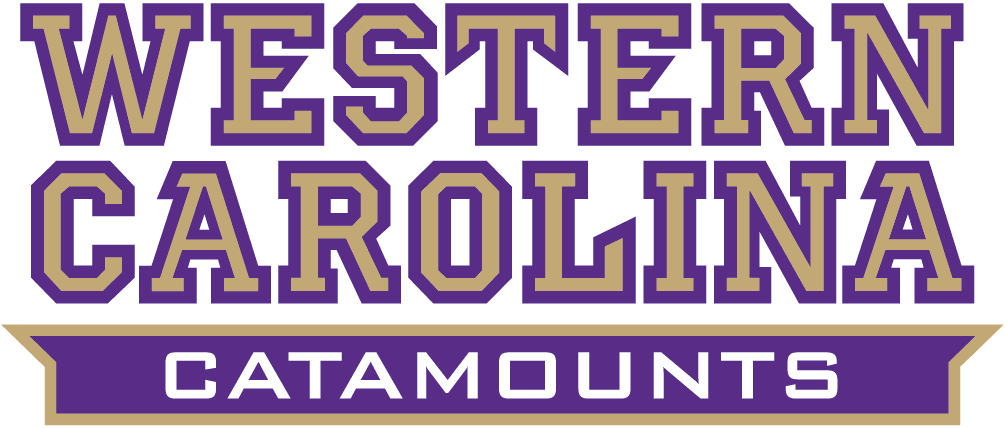
- Conference: Southern Conference
- Record: 2–9 (1–7 SoCon)
- Head coach: Dennis Wagner (2nd season)
- Offensive coordinator: Keith Heckendorf (2nd season)
- Defensive coordinator: Matt Pawlowski (2nd season)
- Home stadium: Bob Waters Field at E. J. Whitmire Stadium

2009 Southern Conference football standings
	Conf.			Overall
Team	W		L	W		L
No. 3 Appalachian State $^	8	–	0	11	–	3
No. 9 Elon ^	7	–	1	9	–	3
Furman	5	–	3	6	–	5
Chattanooga	4	–	4	6	–	5
Georgia Southern	4	–	4	5	–	6
Samford	3	–	5	5	–	6
Wofford	2	–	6	3	–	8
The Citadel	2	–	6	4	–	7
Western Carolina	1	–	7	2	–	9
$ – Conference champion; ^ – FCS playoff participant; Rankings from The Sports Network poll

The 2009 Western Carolina Catamounts team represented Western Carolina University as a member of the Southern Conference (SoCon) during the 2009 NCAA Division I FCS football season. Led by second-year head coach Dennis Wagner, the Catamounts compiled an overall record of 2–9 with a mark of 1–7 in conference play, placing last out of nine teams in the SoCon. Western Carolina played home games at Bob Waters Field at E. J. Whitmire Stadium in Cullowhee, North Carolina.

== Schedule ==
Date	Time	Opponent	Site	TV	Result	Attendance	Source
September 5	7:30 pm	at Vanderbilt*	Vanderbilt Stadium; Nashville, TN	CSS	L 0–45	36,350	
September 12	6:00 pm	Gardner–Webb*	Bob Waters Field at E. J. Whitmire Stadium; Cullowhee, NC		L 20–27	9,673	
September 19	6:00 pm	at Georgia Southern	Paulson Stadium; Statesboro, GA		L 3–27	17,633	
September 26	7:00 pm	Furman	Bob Waters Field at E. J. Whitmire Stadium; Cullowhee, NC		L 14–33	2,034	
October 3	3:00 pm	at Samford	Seibert Stadium; Homewood, AL		L 3–16	4,377	
October 17	4:00 pm	The Citadel^{†}	Bob Waters Field at E. J. Whitmire Stadium; Cullowhee, NC	SCTV	W 14–10	6,821	
October 24	4:00 pm	Wofford	Bob Waters Field at E. J. Whitmire Stadium; Cullowhee, NC		L 26–35	10,017	
October 31	2:00 pm	at Chattanooga	Finley Stadium; Chattanooga, TN		L 20–24	9,320	
November 7	1:00 pm	No. 6 Elon	Bob Waters Field at E. J. Whitmire Stadium; Cullowhee, NC		L 17–42	6,943	
November 14	1:00 pm	at Eastern Kentucky*	Roy Kidd Stadium; Richmond, KY		W 24–7	4,200	
November 21	3:30 pm	at No. 6 Appalachian State	Kidd Brewer Stadium; Boone, NC (Battle for the Old Mountain Jug)		L 14–19	30,098	
*Non-conference game; ^{†}Homecoming; Rankings from The Sports Network Poll released prior to the game; All times are in Eastern time
