= 2009 Stony Brook Seawolves football team =

American college football season

2009 Stony Brook Seawolves football

Big South co-champion
- Conference: Big South Conference
- Record: 6–5 (5–1 Big South)
- Head coach: Chuck Priore (4th season)
- Offensive coordinator: Jeff Behrman (4th season)
- Defensive coordinator: Jim Gush (1st season)
- Home stadium: Kenneth P. LaValle Stadium

2009 Big South Conference football standings
	Conf.			Overall
Team	W		L	W		L
No. 22 Liberty +	5	–	1	8	–	3
Stony Brook +	5	–	1	6	–	5
Charleston Southern	4	–	2	6	–	5
Gardner–Webb	3	–	3	6	–	5
Coastal Carolina	3	–	3	5	–	6
VMI	1	–	5	2	–	9
Presbyterian	0	–	6	0	–	11
+ – Conference co-champions; Rankings from The Sports Network poll

The 2009 Stony Brook Seawolves football team represented Stony Brook University as a member of the Big South Conference during the 2009 NCAA Division I FCS football season. The team was led by fourth-year head coach Chuck Priore and played it home games at Kenneth P. LaValle Stadium at Stony Brook, New York. The Seawolves compiled an overall record of 6–5 with a mark of 5–1 in conference place, sharing the Big South title with Liberty. This was Stony Brook's first Big South championship.

== Schedule ==
Date	Time	Opponent	Site	TV	Result	Attendance	Source
September 5	7:00 pm	at Hofstra*	James M. Shuart Stadium; Hempstead, NY	FiOS1 / Big South Net	L 10–17	7,160	
September 12	7:00 pm	at Colgate*	Andy Kerr Stadium; Hamilton, NY	Big South Net	L 13–23	3,122	
September 19	6:00 pm	Brown*	Kenneth P. LaValle Stadium; Stony Brook, NY	Big South Net	W 21–20	5,709	
September 26	6:00 pm	at No. 15 UMass*	Warren McGuirk Alumni Stadium; Hadley, MA	Big South Net	L 17–44	16,122	
October 3	3:00 pm	Presbyterian^{†}	Kenneth P. LaValle Stadium; Stony Brook, NY	Big South Net	W 52–14	6,243	
October 10	2:00 pm	at North Dakota*	Alerus Center; Grand Forks, ND	Big South Net	L 41–21	8,494	
October 17	1:30 pm	at VMI	Alumni Memorial Field; Lexington, VA	Big South Net	W 27–20	7,112	
October 24	3:30 pm	Coastal Carolina	Kenneth P. LaValle Stadium; Stony Brook, NY	MASN / Big South Net	W 16–10	3,292	
October 31	1:30 pm	at Gardner–Webb	Ernest W. Spangler Stadium; Boiling Springs, NC	Big South Net	W 24–14	5,430	
November 14	1:30 pm	at Charleston Southern	Buccaneer Field; Charleston, SC	Big South Net	L 27–30 ^{OT}	2,954	
November 21	1:00 pm	No. 16 Liberty	Kenneth P. LaValle Stadium; Stony Brook, NY	Big South Net	W 36–33	3,964	
*Non-conference game; ^{†}Homecoming; Rankings from The Sports Network Poll released prior to the game; All times are in Eastern time
