= 2009 Samford Bulldogs football team =

American college football season

2009 Samford Bulldogs football
- Conference: Southern Conference
- Record: 5–6 (3–5 SoCon)
- Head coach: Pat Sullivan (3rd season)
- Offensive coordinator: Steve Brickey (3rd season)
- Defensive coordinator: Bill D'Ottavio (3rd season)
- Home stadium: Seibert Stadium

2009 Southern Conference football standings
	Conf.			Overall
Team	W		L	W		L
No. 3 Appalachian State $^	8	–	0	11	–	3
No. 9 Elon ^	7	–	1	9	–	3
Furman	5	–	3	6	–	5
Chattanooga	4	–	4	6	–	5
Georgia Southern	4	–	4	5	–	6
Samford	3	–	5	5	–	6
Wofford	2	–	6	3	–	8
The Citadel	2	–	6	4	–	7
Western Carolina	1	–	7	2	–	9
$ – Conference champion; ^ – FCS playoff participant; Rankings from The Sports Network poll

The 2009 Samford Bulldogs football team represented Samford University as a member of the Southern Conference (SoCon) during the 2009 NCAA Division I FCS football season. Led by third-year head coach Pat Sullivan, the Bulldogs compiled an overall record of 5–6, with a mark of 3–5 in conference play, and finished sixth in the SoCon. The team played home games at Seibert Stadium in Homewood, Alabama.

== Schedule ==
Date	Time	Opponent	Site	TV	Result	Attendance	Source
September 5	6:30 pm	at UCF*	Bright House Networks Stadium; Orlando, FL	BHSN	L 24–28	34,486	
September 12	5:00 pm	Jacksonville*	Seibert Stadium; Homewood, AL		W 27–0	5,328	
September 19	2:00 pm	Miles*	Seibert Stadium; Homewood, AL		W 31–12	4,567	
September 26	2:30 pm	at No. 10 Appalachian State	Kidd Brewer Stadium; Boone, NC		L 7–20	22,139	
October 3	2:00 pm	Western Carolina	Seibert Stadium; Homewood, AL		W 16–3	4,377	
October 10	3:00 pm	Chattanooga	Seibert Stadium; Homewood, AL		L 7–14	6,393	
October 17	1:00 pm	at Furman	Paladin Stadium; Greenville, SC		L 24–26	10,846	
October 31	12:00 pm	at The Citadel	Johnson Hagood Stadium; Charleston, SC		L 16–28	8,317	
November 7	2:30 pm	Georgia Southern^{†}	Seibert Stadium; Homewood, AL		W 31–10	7,730	
November 14	12:30 pm	at Wofford	Gibbs Stadium; Spartanburg, SC		W 27–24	5,917	
November 21	2:00 pm	No. 10 Elon	Seibert Stadium; Homewood, AL		L 7–27	4,283	
*Non-conference game; ^{†}Homecoming; Rankings from The Sports Network Poll released prior to the game; All times are in Central time
