= 2009 Lafayette Leopards football team =

American college football season

2009 Lafayette Leopards football
- Conference: Patriot League

Ranking
- Sports Network: No. 24
- FCS Coaches: No. 25
- Record: 8–3 (4–2 Patriot)
- Head coach: Frank Tavani (10th season)
- Offensive coordinator: Mickey Fein (1st season)
- Offensive scheme: Multiple
- Defensive coordinator: John Loose (10th season)
- Base defense: 4–3
- Home stadium: Fisher Stadium

2009 Patriot League football standings
| | Conf. | | | Overall |
| Team | W | | L | W | | L |
|---|---|---|---|---|---|---|
| No. 14 Holy Cross $^ | 5 | – | 1 | 9 | – | 3 |
| No. 21 Colgate | 4 | – | 2 | 9 | – | 2 |
| No. 24 Lafayette | 4 | – | 2 | 8 | – | 3 |
| Lehigh | 4 | – | 2 | 4 | – | 7 |
| Fordham | 2 | – | 4 | 5 | – | 6 |
| Bucknell | 2 | – | 4 | 4 | – | 7 |
| Georgetown | 0 | – | 6 | 0 | – | 11 |
$ – Conference champion; ^ – FCS playoff participant; Rankings from The Sports Network poll

The 2009 Lafayette Leopards football team represented Lafayette College as member of the Patriot League during the 2009 NCAA Division I FCS football season. Led by tenth-year head coach Frank Tavani, the Leopards compiled an overall record of 8–3 with a mark of 4–2 in conference play, placing in a three-way tie for second in the Patriot League. Lafayette played home games at Fisher Field in Easton, Pennsylvania.

== Schedule ==
| Date | Time | Opponent | Rank | Site | TV | Result | Attendance | Source |
|---|---|---|---|---|---|---|---|---|
| September 12 | 6:00 pm | at Georgetown | | Multi-Sport Field; Washington, DC | LSN | W 28–3 | 2,875 | |
| September 19 | 6:00 pm | No. 24 Liberty* | | Fisher Stadium; Easton, PA | LSN | L 13–19 | 8,921 | |
| September 26 | 6:00 pm | Penn* | | Fisher Stadium; Easton, PA | LSN | W 24–21 ^{OT} | 10,197 | |
| October 3 | 12:00 pm | at Yale* | | Yale Bowl; New Haven, CT | LSN | W 31–14 | 3,879 | |
| October 10 | 6:00 pm | Columbia* | | Fisher Stadium; Easton, PA | LSN | W 24–21 | 5,843 | |
| October 17 | 12:00 pm | at Harvard* | | Harvard Stadium; Boston, MA | LSN | W 35–18 | 7,416 | |
| October 24 | 1:00 pm | Fordham^{†} | | Fisher Stadium; Easton, PA | LSN | W 26–21 | 6,288 | |
| October 31 | 1:00 pm | Bucknell | | Fisher Stadium; Easton, PA | LSN | W 35–14 | 5,549 | |
| November 7 | 1:00 pm | No. 20 Colgate | No. 24 | Fisher Stadium; Easton, PA | LSN | W 56–49 | 8,937 | |
| November 14 | 12:00 pm | at No. 13 Holy Cross | No. 20 | Fitton Field; Worcester, MA | LSN | L 26–28 | 5,291 | |
| November 21 | 12:30 pm | at Lehigh | No. 21 | Goodman Stadium; Bethlehem, PA (The Rivalry) | LSN | L 21–27 ^{OT} | 15,714 | |
*Non-conference game; ^{†}Homecoming; Rankings from The Sports Network Poll released prior to the game; All times are in Eastern time
