= 2009 Penn Quakers football team =

American college football season

2009 Penn Quakers football

Ivy League champion
- Conference: Ivy League

Ranking
- Sports Network: No. 20
- FCS Coaches: No. 23
- Record: 8–2 (7–0 Ivy)
- Head coach: Al Bagnoli (18th season)
- Offensive coordinator: Jon McLaughlin (1st season)
- Defensive coordinator: Ray Priore (12th season)
- Home stadium: Franklin Field

2009 Ivy League football standings
	Conf.			Overall
Team	W		L	W		L
No. 20 Penn $	7	–	0	8	–	2
Harvard	6	–	1	7	–	3
Brown	4	–	3	6	–	4
Columbia	3	–	4	4	–	6
Princeton	3	–	4	4	–	6
Yale	2	–	5	4	–	6
Dartmouth	2	–	5	2	–	8
Cornell	1	–	6	2	–	8
$ – Conference champion; Rankings from The Sports Network poll

The 2009 Penn Quakers football team was an American football team that represented the University of Pennsylvania in the 2009 NCAA Division I FCS football season. It was the 133rd season of play for the Quakers. The team was led by Al Bagnoli, in his 18th season as head coach. The Quakers played their home games at Franklin Field in Philadelphia. Penn averaged 9,550 fans per game. The season was highlighted by an eight-game winning streak to close the season as Penn captured its 14th Ivy League title, going undefeated in conference play.

== Schedule ==
Date	Time	Opponent	Rank	Site	TV	Result	Attendance	Source
September 19	7:00 pm	No. 2 Villanova*		Franklin Field; Philadelphia, PA	CSN	L 3–14	14,876	
September 26	6:00 pm	at Lafayette*		Fisher Stadium; Easton, PA	MASN	L 17–20 ^{OT}	10,197	
October 3	Noon	at Dartmouth		Memorial Field; Hanover, NH	Versus	W 30–24	3,623	
October 10	1:00 pm	Bucknell*		Franklin Field; Philadelphia, PA		W 21–3	2,540	
October 17	1:30 pm	at Columbia		Robert K. Kraft Field at Lawrence A. Wien Stadium; New York, NY		W 27–13	7,301	
October 24	3:30 pm	Yale		Franklin Field; Philadelphia, PA	CSN	W 9–0	7,290	
October 31	12:30 pm	at Brown		Brown Stadium; Providence, RI		W 14–7 ^{OT}	9,417	
November 7	3:30 pm	Princeton^{†}		Franklin Field; Philadelphia, PA (rivalry)	CSN	W 42–7	14,027	
November 14	Noon	at Harvard		Harvard Stadium; Boston, MA (rivalry)		W 17–7	7,424	
November 21	1:00 pm	Cornell	No. 24	Franklin Field; Philadelphia, PA (rivalry)		W 34–0	9,018	
*Non-conference game; ^{†}Homecoming; Rankings from The Sports Network Poll released prior to the game; All times are in Eastern time
