= 2009 VMI Keydets football team =

American college football season

2009 VMI Keydets football
- Conference: Big South Conference
- Record: 2–9 (1–5 Big South)
- Head coach: Sparky Woods (2nd season)
- Offensive coordinator: Brent Davis (4th season)
- Offensive scheme: Option
- Defensive coordinator: A. J. Christoff (2nd season)
- Base defense: 4–3
- Home stadium: Alumni Memorial Field

2009 Big South Conference football standings
	Conf.			Overall
Team	W		L	W		L
No. 22 Liberty +	5	–	1	8	–	3
Stony Brook +	5	–	1	6	–	5
Charleston Southern	4	–	2	6	–	5
Gardner–Webb	3	–	3	6	–	5
Coastal Carolina	3	–	3	5	–	6
VMI	1	–	5	2	–	9
Presbyterian	0	–	6	0	–	11
+ – Conference co-champions; Rankings from The Sports Network poll

The 2009 VMI Keydets football team represented the Virginia Military Institute during the 2009 NCAA Division I FCS football season. It was VMI's 119th all-time football season which started in 1891. They competed in the Big South Conference, and they were led by 2nd year head coach Sparky Woods, who was appointed VMI's 30th head coach in 2008. VMI played its home games at Alumni Memorial Field, as they still do ever since 1962.

The Keydets kicked off the year by just defeating Robert Morris 14–13. Two losses followed to then-#6 James Madison and then-#1 Richmond, 44–16 and 38–28, respectively. Three more losses followed to conference opponents Gardner-Webb, Coastal Carolina, and Stony Brook. The next week, VMI held off Presbyterian for a 31–20 win. It would be their final win of the year, as the Keydets lost to Charleston Southern, Liberty, Army, and Old Dominion. VMI finished 2–9 overall and 1–5 in the Big South.

== Schedule ==
Date	Time	Opponent	Site	Result	Attendance
September 5	1:30 pm	Robert Morris*	Alumni Memorial Field; Lexington, VA	W 14–13	6,084
September 19	6:00 pm	at No. 7 James Madison*	Bridgeforth Stadium; Harrisonburg, VA	L 44–16	15,951
September 26	3:30 pm	at No. 1 Richmond*	University of Richmond Stadium; Richmond, VA (rivalry)	L 38–28	7,554
October 3	1:30 pm	Gardner–Webb^{†}	Alumni Memorial Field; Lexington, VA	L 27–23	5,846
October 10	7:00 pm	at Coastal Carolina	Brooks Stadium; Conway, SC	L 20–6	6,506
October 17	1:30 pm	Stony Brook	Alumni Memorial Field; Lexington, VA	L 27–20	7,112
October 24	2:00 pm	at Presbyterian	Bailey Memorial Stadium; Clinton, SC	W 31–20	3,483
October 31	1:30 pm	Charleston Southern	Alumni Memorial Field; Lexington, VA	L 31–21	4,217
November 7	7:00 pm	at No. 16 Liberty	Williams Stadium; Lynchburg, VA	L 54–14	15,208
November 14	Noon	at Army*	Michie Stadium; West Point, NY	L 22–17	32,109
November 21	1:30 pm	Old Dominion*	Alumni Memorial Field; Lexington, VA	L 42–35	8,132
*Non-conference game; ^{†}Homecoming; Rankings from The Sports Network Poll released prior to the game

== Team leaders ==
=== Rushing ===
Name	GP	Attempts	Net Yards	Avg.	TD	Avg/Game
Howard Abegesah	11	171	964	5.6	6	87.6
Kyle Hughes	11	136	642	4.7	7	58.4
Tim Maypray	11	115	519	4.5	6	47.2

=== Passing ===
Name	GP	Comp	Attempts	Int	TD	Yards	Avg/game
Kyle Hughes	11	47	99	8	5	697	63.4
Cam Jones	7	4	11	0	1	30	4.3
Tim Maypray	11	2	5	0	0	11	1.0

=== Receiving ===
Name	GP	Thrown to	Yards	Avg.	TD	Avg/Game
Mario Scott	11	14	237	16.9	3	21.5
Tim Maypray	11	12	152	12.7	3	13.8
Bryan Barnson	11	11	183	16.6	0	16.6

=== Punt returning ===
Name	Attempts	Yards	Avg.	TD	Long
Tim Maypray	16	207	12.9	1	86
Jafri Taylor	1	34	34.0	0	34
Greg Walker	1	16	16.0	0	16

=== Interceptions ===
Name	Int	Yards	Avg.	TD
Juan Thrasher	1	1	1.0	0
Michael Johnson	1	0	0	0
Josh Sneed	1	11	11.0	0

=== Kick returning ===
Name	Attempts	Yards	Avg.	TD	Long
Tim Maypray	46	972	21.1	0	47
Michael Rainey-Wiles	3	46	15.3	0	22
Bryant Youngblood	2	13	6.5	0	7
