= 2009 Wofford Terriers football team =

American college football season

2009 Wofford Terriers football
- Conference: Southern Conference
- Record: 3–8 (2–6 SoCon)
- Head coach: Mike Ayers (22nd season)
- Home stadium: Gibbs Stadium

2009 Southern Conference football standings
	Conf.			Overall
Team	W		L	W		L
No. 3 Appalachian State $^	8	–	0	11	–	3
No. 9 Elon ^	7	–	1	9	–	3
Furman	5	–	3	6	–	5
Chattanooga	4	–	4	6	–	5
Georgia Southern	4	–	4	5	–	6
Samford	3	–	5	5	–	6
Wofford	2	–	6	3	–	8
The Citadel	2	–	6	4	–	7
Western Carolina	1	–	7	2	–	9
$ – Conference champion; ^ – FCS playoff participant; Rankings from The Sports Network poll

The 2009 Wofford Terriers football team represented Wofford College during the 2009 NCAA Division I FCS football season. The team was led by 22nd-year head coach Mike Ayers and played its home games at Gibbs Stadium. It finished the regular season with a 3–8 record overall and a 2–6 record in the Southern Conference, tying for seventh place.

== Schedule ==
Date	Time	Opponent	Rank	Site	TV	Result	Attendance	Source
September 5	7:00 pm	at South Florida*		Raymond James Stadium; Tampa, FL	BHSN	L 7–40	40,360	
September 12	7:00 pm	Charleston Southern*	No. 14	Gibbs Stadium; Spartanburg, SC		W 42–14	7,017	
September 19	12:00 pm	at Wisconsin*		Camp Randall Stadium; Madison, WI	BTN	L 14–44	78,253	
September 26	6:00 pm	at Chattanooga	No. 17	Finley Stadium; Chattanooga, TN		L 9–38	8,452	
October 3	1:30 pm	Georgia Southern		Gibbs Stadium; Spartanburg, SC		L 21–26	8,490	
October 17	3:00 pm	No. 9 Appalachian State		Gibbs Stadium; Spartanburg, SC	SportSouth	L 34–44	8,330	
October 24	4:00 pm	at Western Carolina		E. J. Whitmire Stadium; Cullowhee, NC		W 35–26	10,017	
October 31	1:30 pm	No. 6 Elon		Gibbs Stadium; Spartanburg, SC		L 6–34	6,213	
November 7	3:05 pm	at The Citadel		Johnson Hagood Stadium; Charleston, SC (rivalry)	SSN	W 43–17	15,155	
November 14	1:30 pm	Samford		Gibbs Stadium; Spartanburg, SC		L 24–27	5,917	
November 21		at Furman		Paladin Stadium; Greenville, SC (rivalry)		L 21–58	9,435	
*Non-conference game; Rankings from The Sports Network Poll released prior to the game; All times are in Eastern time
