= 2009 Elon Phoenix football team =

American college football season

2009 Elon Phoenix football

NCAA Division I first round, L 13–16 at Richmond
- Conference: Southern Conference

Ranking
- Sports Network: No. 9
- Record: 9–3 (7–1 SoCon)
- Head coach: Pete Lembo (4th season)
- Offensive coordinator: Rich Skrosky (1st as OC, 4th overall season)
- Defensive coordinator: Jay Bateman (4th season)
- Home stadium: Rhodes Stadium

2009 Southern Conference football standings
	Conf.			Overall
Team	W		L	W		L
No. 3 Appalachian State $^	8	–	0	11	–	3
No. 9 Elon ^	7	–	1	9	–	3
Furman	5	–	3	6	–	5
Chattanooga	4	–	4	6	–	5
Georgia Southern	4	–	4	5	–	6
Samford	3	–	5	5	–	6
Wofford	2	–	6	3	–	8
The Citadel	2	–	6	4	–	7
Western Carolina	1	–	7	2	–	9
$ – Conference champion; ^ – FCS playoff participant; Rankings from The Sports Network poll

The 2009 Elon Phoenix football team was an American football team that represented Elon University as a member of the Southern Conference (SoCon) during the 2009 NCAA Division I FCS football season. Led by fourth-year head coach Pete Lembo, the Phoenix compiled an overall record of 9–3, with a mark of 7–1 in conference play, and finished second in the SoCon. The Phoenix advanced to the NCAA Division I playoffs and were defeated by Richmond in the first round.

== Schedule ==
Date	Time	Opponent	Rank	Site	TV	Result	Attendance	Source
September 5	7:00 p.m.	Davidson*	No. 11	Rhodes Stadium; Elon, NC		W 56–0	8,258	
September 12	1:30 p.m.	at Presbyterian*	No. 11	Bailey Memorial Stadium; Clinton, SC		W 41–7	2,461	
September 19	6:30 p.m.	at Wake Forest*	No. 11	BB&T Field; Winston-Salem, NC	ACCS	L 7–35	31,454	
September 26	1:30 p.m.	Georgia Southern	No. 13	Rhodes Stadium; Elon, NC		W 28–14	10,189	
October 3	3:00 p.m.	at Furman	No. 12	Paladin Stadium; Greenville, SC		W 19–12	12,412	
October 10	1:30 p.m.	The Citadel	No. 10	Rhodes Stadium; Elon, NC		W 43–7	7,524	
October 24	1:30 p.m.	Chattanooga	No. 7	Rhodes Stadium; Elon, NC		W 45–10	8,264	
October 31	1:30 p.m.	at Wofford	No. 6	Gibbs Stadium; Spartanburg, SC		W 34–6	6,213	
November 7	1:00 p.m.	at Western Carolina	No. 6	E. J. Whitmire Stadium; Cullowhee, NC		W 42–17	6,943	
November 14	3:00 p.m.	No. 7 Appalachian State	No. 6	Rhodes Stadium; Elon, NC	SportSouth	L 10–27	14,167	
November 21	2:00 p.m.	at Samford	No. 10	Seibert Stadium; Homewood, AL		W 27–7	4,283	
November 28	1:00 p.m.	at No. 4 Richmond*	No. 9	University of Richmond Stadium; Richmond, VA (NCAA Division I First Round)		L 13–16	6,143	
*Non-conference game; Rankings from The Sports Network Poll released prior to the game; All times are in Eastern time
