= 2009 Georgia Southern Eagles football team =

American college football season

2009 Georgia Southern Eagles football
- Conference: Southern Conference
- Record: 5–6 (4–4 SoCon)
- Head coach: Chris Hatcher (3rd season)
- Offensive coordinator: Rance Gillespie (3rd season)
- Offensive scheme: Triple option
- Defensive coordinator: Ashley Anders (3rd season)
- Base defense: 4–3
- Home stadium: Paulson Stadium

2009 Southern Conference football standings
	Conf.			Overall
Team	W		L	W		L
No. 3 Appalachian State $^	8	–	0	11	–	3
No. 9 Elon ^	7	–	1	9	–	3
Furman	5	–	3	6	–	5
Chattanooga	4	–	4	6	–	5
Georgia Southern	4	–	4	5	–	6
Samford	3	–	5	5	–	6
Wofford	2	–	6	3	–	8
The Citadel	2	–	6	4	–	7
Western Carolina	1	–	7	2	–	9
$ – Conference champion; ^ – FCS playoff participant; Rankings from The Sports Network poll

The 2009 Georgia Southern Eagles team represented Georgia Southern University in the 2009 NCAA Division I FCS football season. The Eagles were led by third-year head coach Chris Hatcher, who was fired following the conclusion of the season, and played their home games at Paulson Stadium. They were a member of the Southern Conference. They finished the season 5–6, 4–4 in Southern Conference play.

== Schedule ==
Date	Time	Opponent	Site	TV	Result	Attendance	Source
September 5	6:00 pm	Albany*	Paulson Stadium; Statesboro, GA		W 29–26	18,118	
September 12	7:00 pm	at No. 21 South Dakota State*	Coughlin–Alumni Stadium; Brookings, SD		L 6–44	12,354	
September 19	6:00 pm	Western Carolina	Paulson Stadium; Statesboro, GA		W 28–6	17,633	
September 26	1:30 pm	at No. 13 Elon	Rhodes Stadium; Elon, NC		L 14–28	10,189	
October 3	1:30 pm	at Wofford	Gibbs Stadium; Spartanburg, SC		W 26–21	8,490	
October 10	3:30 pm	at North Carolina*	Kenan Memorial Stadium; Chapel Hill, NC	ESPN360	L 12–42	47,000	
October 17	6:00 pm	Chattanooga	Paulson Stadium; Statesboro, GA		W 30–20	17,357	
October 24	3:00 pm	at No. 8 Appalachian State	Kidd Brewer Stadium; Boone, NC (rivalry)	SS	L 16–52	26,215	
November 7	3:30 pm	at Samford	Seibert Stadium; Homewood, AL		L 10–31	7,730	
November 14	2:00 pm	Furman^{†}	Paulson Stadium; Statesboro, GA		L 22–30	17,922	
November 21	2:00 pm	The Citadel	Paulson Stadium; Statesboro, GA		W 13–6	12,611	
*Non-conference game; ^{†}Homecoming; Rankings from The Sports Network Poll released prior to the game; All times are in Eastern time
