= 2009 Presbyterian Blue Hose football team =

American college football season

2009 Presbyterian Blue Hose football
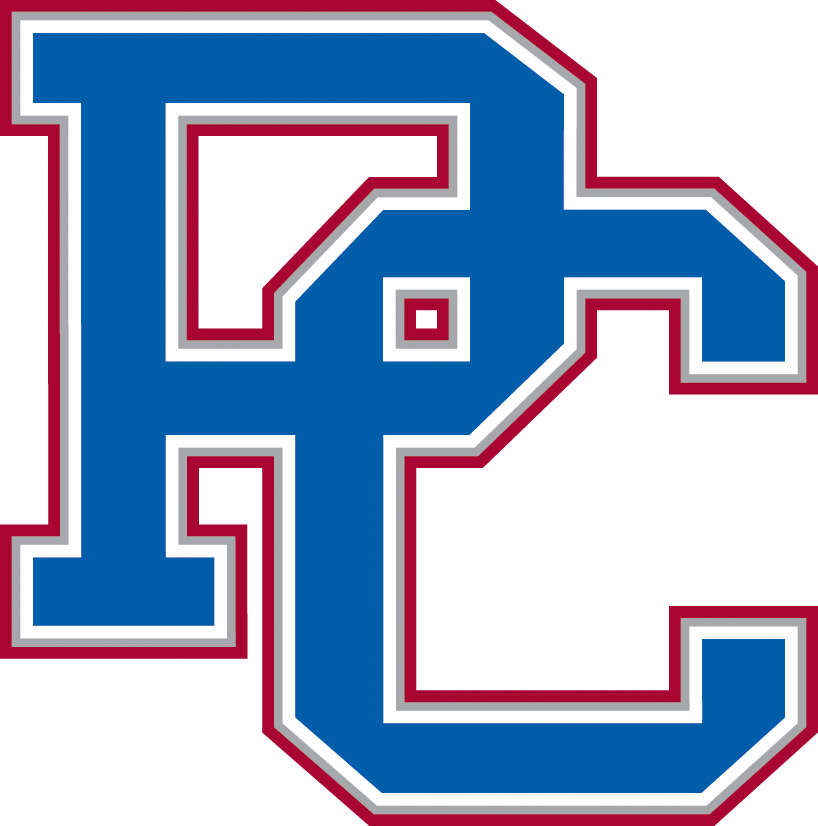
- Conference: Big South Conference
- Record: 0–11 (0–6 Big South)
- Head coach: Harold Nichols (1st season)
- Home stadium: Bailey Memorial Stadium

2009 Big South Conference football standings
	Conf.			Overall
Team	W		L	W		L
No. 22 Liberty +	5	–	1	8	–	3
Stony Brook +	5	–	1	6	–	5
Charleston Southern	4	–	2	6	–	5
Gardner–Webb	3	–	3	6	–	5
Coastal Carolina	3	–	3	5	–	6
VMI	1	–	5	2	–	9
Presbyterian	0	–	6	0	–	11
+ – Conference co-champions; Rankings from The Sports Network poll

The 2009 Presbyterian Blue Hose football team represented Presbyterian College in the 2009 NCAA Division I FCS football season. They were led by first-year head coach Harold Nichols and played their home games at Bailey Memorial Stadium. They were a member of the Big South Conference. They finished the season 0–11, 0–6 in Big South play to finish in last place.

== Schedule ==
Date	Time	Opponent	Site	TV	Result	Attendance	Source
September 5	5:00 p.m.	at Furman*	Paladin Stadium; Greenville, SC	WMYA	L 21–45	10,960	
September 12	1:30 p.m.	No. 11 Elon*	Bailey Memorial Stadium; Clinton, SC		L 7–41	2,461	
September 19	1:30 p.m.	Chattanooga*	Bailey Memorial Stadium; Clinton, SC		L 13–29	2,951	
September 26	7:00 p.m.	at The Citadel*	Johnson Hagood Stadium; Charleston, SC		L 21–46	13,034	
October 3	3:00 p.m.	at Stony Brook	Kenneth P. LaValle Stadium; Stony Brook, NY		L 14–52	6,243	
October 10	6:00 p.m.	at Old Dominion*	S.B. Ballard Stadium; Norfolk, VA		L 16–34	19,782	
October 24	2:00 p.m.	VMI	Bailey Memorial Stadium; Clinton, SC	BSN	L 20–31	3,483	
October 31	3:30 p.m.	at No. 23 Liberty	Williams Stadium; Lynchburg, VA	MASN	L 19–55	14,197	
November 7	1:30 p.m.	Charleston Southern	Bailey Memorial Stadium; Clinton, SC	BSN	L 32–46	2,001	
November 14	12:30 p.m.	at Coastal Carolina	Brooks Stadium; Conway, SC	BSN	L 37–41	5,207	
November 21	1:00 p.m.	Gardner–Webb	Bailey Memorial Stadium; Clinton, SC	BSN	L 14–21	2,554	
*Non-conference game; Rankings from The Sports Network Poll released prior to the game; All times are in Eastern time
