= 2009 Charleston Southern Buccaneers football team =

American college football season

2009 Charleston Southern Buccaneers football
- Conference: Big South Conference
- Record: 6–5 (4–2 Big South)
- Head coach: Jay Mills (7th season)
- Defensive coordinator: Thielen Smith (2nd season)
- Home stadium: Buccaneer Field

2009 Big South Conference football standings
	Conf.			Overall
Team	W		L	W		L
No. 22 Liberty +	5	–	1	8	–	3
Stony Brook +	5	–	1	6	–	5
Charleston Southern	4	–	2	6	–	5
Gardner–Webb	3	–	3	6	–	5
Coastal Carolina	3	–	3	5	–	6
VMI	1	–	5	2	–	9
Presbyterian	0	–	6	0	–	11
+ – Conference co-champions; Rankings from The Sports Network poll

The 2009 Charleston Southern Buccaneers football team represented Charleston Southern University as a member of the Big South Conference during the 2009 NCAA Division I FCS football season. Led by seventh-year head coach Jay Mills, the Buccaneers compiled an overall record of 6–5 with a mark of 4–2 in conference play, placing third in the Big South.

== Schedule ==
Date	Time	Opponent	Site	TV	Result	Attendance	Source
September 5	7:00 pm	at No. 1 (FBS) Florida*	Ben Hill Griffin Stadium; Gainesville, FL	FSN	L 3–62	90,621	
September 12	7:00 pm	at No. 14 Wofford*	Gibbs Stadium; Spartanburg, SC		L 14–42	7,017	
September 19	7:00 pm	at South Florida*	Raymond James Stadium; Tampa, FL		L 0–59	38,798	
September 26	1:30 pm	North Greenville*	Buccaneer Field; Charleston, SC		W 34–0	3,426	
October 3	1:30 pm	Savannah State*	Buccaneer Field; Charleston, SC		W 47–10	3,023	
October 17	11:30 am	at Gardner–Webb	Ernest W. Spangler Stadium; Boiling Springs, NC	SportSouth	L 20–27	4,870	
October 24	1:30 pm	No. 23 Liberty	Buccaneer Field; Charleston, SC		L 13–20	3,845	
October 31	1:30 pm	at VMI	Alumni Memorial Field; Lexington, VA		W 31–21	4,217	
November 7	1:30 pm	at Presbyterian	Bailey Memorial Stadium; Clinton, SC	BSN	W 46–32	2,001	
November 14	1:30 pm	Stony Brook	Buccaneer Field; Charleston, SC	Big South Net	W 30–27 ^{OT}	2,954	
November 21	1:30 pm	Coastal Carolina	Buccaneer Field; Charleston, SC		W 30–23	2,914	
*Non-conference game; Rankings from The Sports Network Poll released prior to the game; All times are in Eastern time
