= 2009 Fordham Rams football team =

American college football season

2009 Fordham Rams football
- Conference: Patriot League
- Record: 5–6 (2–4 Patriot)
- Head coach: Tom Masella (4th season)
- Offensive coordinator: Bryan Volk (1st season)
- Defensive coordinator: Patrick Moore (1st season)
- Home stadium: Coffey Field

2009 Patriot League football standings
	Conf.			Overall
Team	W		L	W		L
No. 14 Holy Cross $^	5	–	1	9	–	3
No. 21 Colgate	4	–	2	9	–	2
No. 24 Lafayette	4	–	2	8	–	3
Lehigh	4	–	2	4	–	7
Fordham	2	–	4	5	–	6
Bucknell	2	–	4	4	–	7
Georgetown	0	–	6	0	–	11
$ – Conference champion; ^ – FCS playoff participant; Rankings from The Sports Network poll

The 2009 Fordham Rams football team was an American football team that represented Fordham University as a member of the Patriot League during the 2009 NCAA Division I FCS football season. In its fourth season under head coach Tom Masella, the team compiled a 5–6 record (2–4 against conference opponents) and played its home games at Jack Coffey Field in The Bronx.

The team was led on offense by six-foot, five-inch quarterback John Skelton. In a game against Cornell on October 17, 2009, Skelton passed for 420 yards and was responsible for six touchdown (five passing and one rushing). During the 2009 season, Skelton led the NCAA FCS in passing yards (337 yards per game) and total passing yards (3,708). He finished his Fordham career as the school's all-time leader in pass completions, passing yards, and touchdown passes; he was inducted into the Fordham Athletic Hall of Fame in 2017. Skelton went on to play in the National Football League for the Arizona Cardinals, San Francisco 49ers, and Tennessee Titans.

The team's other statistical leaders included Xavier Martin with 700 rushing yards and Jason Caldwell with 79 receptions for 1,252 yards.

== Schedule ==
Date	Time	Opponent	Site	Result	Attendance	Source
September 5	1:00 pm	at Rhode Island*	Meade Stadium; Kingston, RI	L 28–41	2,731	
September 19	6:05 pm	Columbia*	Coffey Field; Bronx, NY (Liberty Cup)	L 28–40	6,449	
September 26	6:00 pm	at Colgate	Andy Kerr Stadium; Hamilton, NY	L 12–20	4,000	
October 3	1:05 pm	Old Dominion^{†}*	Coffey Field; Bronx, NY	W 34–29	3,673	
October 10	6:05 pm	Bryant*	Coffey Field; Bronx, NY	W 35–7	2,557	
October 17	12:37 pm	at Cornell*	Schoellkopf Field; Ithaca, NY	W 39–27	8,231	
October 24	1:08 pm	at Lafayette	Fisher Stadium; Easton, PA	L 21–26	6,288	
October 31	1:05 pm	No. 17 Holy Cross	Coffey Field; Bronx, NY	L 27–41	3,449	
November 7	1:05 pm	Bucknell	Coffey Field; Bronx, NY	W 21–7	4,703	
November 14	1:07 pm	Lehigh	Coffey Field; Bronx, NY	L 28–35	2,484	
November 21	1:05 pm	at Georgetown	Multi-Sport Field; Washington, DC	W 41–14	2,432	
*Non-conference game; ^{†}Homecoming; Rankings from The Sports Network Poll released prior to the game; All times are in Eastern time
