= 2009 Liberty Flames football team =

American college football season

2009 Liberty Flames football
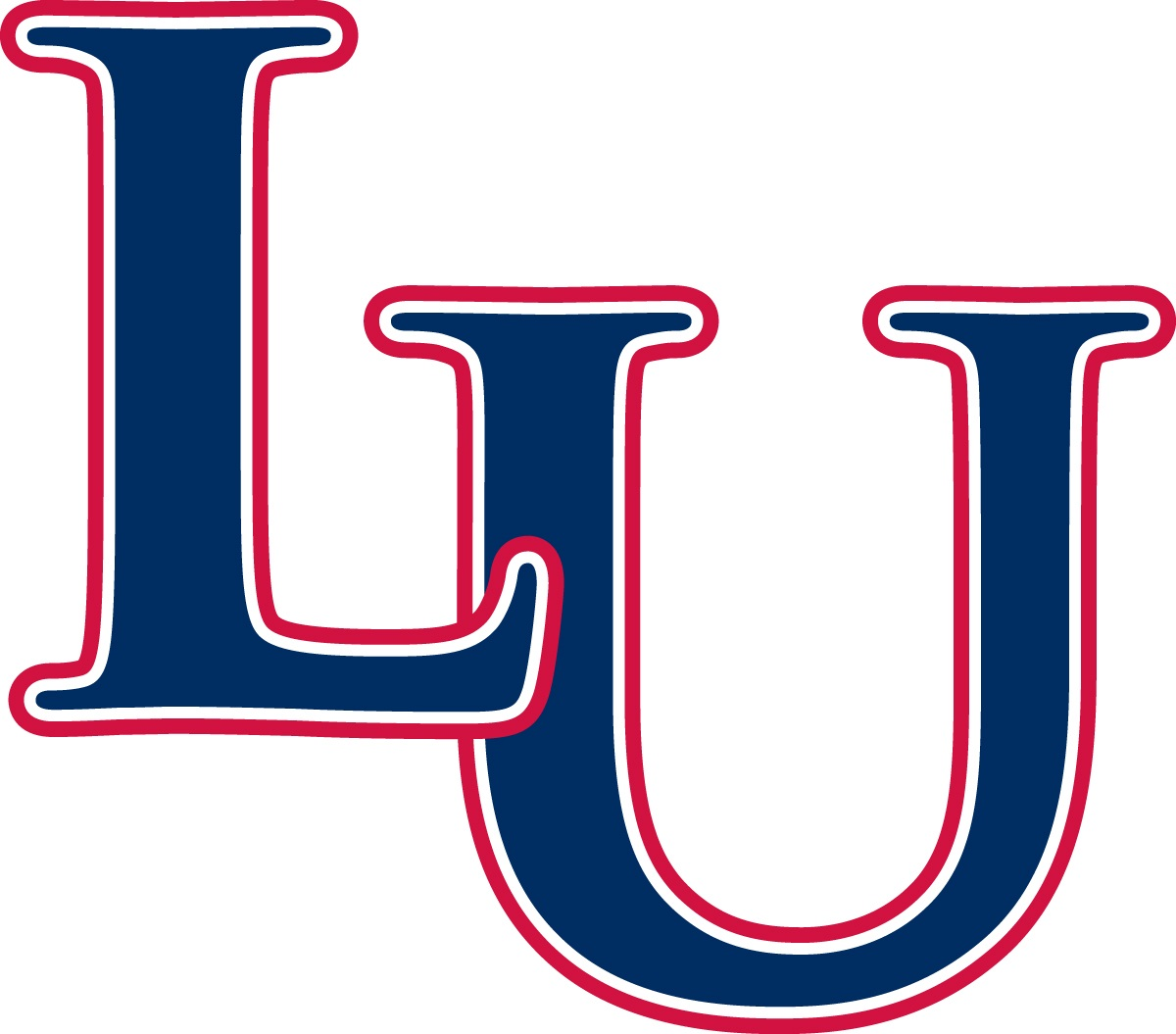

Big South co-champion
- Conference: Big South Conference

Ranking
- Sports Network: No. 22
- FCS Coaches: No. 21
- Record: 8–3 (5–1 Big South)
- Head coach: Danny Rocco (4th season)
- Offensive coordinator: Brandon Streeter (1st as OC, 4th overall season)
- Defensive coordinator: Tom Clark (4th season)
- Base defense: 3–4
- Home stadium: Williams Stadium

2009 Big South Conference football standings
	Conf.			Overall
Team	W		L	W		L
No. 22 Liberty +	5	–	1	8	–	3
Stony Brook +	5	–	1	6	–	5
Charleston Southern	4	–	2	6	–	5
Gardner–Webb	3	–	3	6	–	5
Coastal Carolina	3	–	3	5	–	6
VMI	1	–	5	2	–	9
Presbyterian	0	–	6	0	–	11
+ – Conference co-champions; Rankings from The Sports Network poll

The 2009 Liberty Flames football team represented Liberty University in the 2009 NCAA Division I FCS football season a member of the Big South Conference. The Flames were led by fourth-year head coach Danny Rocco and played their home games at Williams Stadium in Lynchburg, Virginia. They finished the season with an overall record of 8–3 and a 5–1 mark in the Big South to share the conference championship with Stony Brook.

== Schedule ==
Date	Time	Opponent	Rank	Site	TV	Result	Attendance
September 5	12:00 pm	at West Virginia*		Milan Puskar Stadium; Morgantown, WV	ESPN Plus	L 20–33	57,950
September 12	7:00 pm	North Carolina Central*	No. 24	Williams Stadium; Lynchburg, VA		W 35–10	16,112
September 19	6:00 pm	at Lafayette*	No. 24	Fisher Stadium; Easton, PA		W 19–13	8,921
September 26	7:00 pm	No. 6 James Madison*	No. 24	Williams Stadium; Lynchburg, VA	FSN	L 10–24	15,532
October 3	3:30 pm	West Virginia Wesleyan*^{†}		Williams Stadium; Lynchburg, VA	FSN	W 45–7	14,167
October 17	3:30 pm	Coastal Carolina		Williams Stadium; Lynchburg, VA (rivalry)	FSN	W 58–13	14,371
October 24	1:30 pm	at Charleston Southern	No. 23	Buccaneer Field; Charleston, SC		W 20–13	3,845
October 31	3:30 pm	Presbyterian	No. 23	Williams Stadium; Lynchburg, VA	FSN	W 55–19	14,197
November 7	7:00 pm	VMI	No. 16	Williams Stadium; Lynchburg, VA	MASN	W 54–14	15,208
November 14	1:30 pm	at Gardner–Webb	No. 16	Ernest W. Spangler Stadium; Boiling Springs, NC	BSN	W 51–28	5,277
November 21	1:00 pm	at Stony Brook	No. 16	Kenneth P. LaValle Stadium; Stony Brook, NY	BSN	L 33–36	3,465
*Non-conference game; ^{†}Homecoming; Rankings from The Sports Network Poll released prior to the game; All times are in Eastern time
