= 2009 Georgetown Hoyas football team =

American college football season

2009 Georgetown Hoyas football
- Conference: Patriot League
- Record: 0–11 (0–6 Patriot)
- Head coach: Kevin Kelly (4th season)
- Defensive coordinator: Rob Sgarlata (4th season)
- Home stadium: Multi-Sport Field

2009 Patriot League football standings
| | Conf. | | | Overall |
| Team | W | | L | W | | L |
|---|---|---|---|---|---|---|
| No. 14 Holy Cross $^ | 5 | – | 1 | 9 | – | 3 |
| No. 21 Colgate | 4 | – | 2 | 9 | – | 2 |
| No. 24 Lafayette | 4 | – | 2 | 8 | – | 3 |
| Lehigh | 4 | – | 2 | 4 | – | 7 |
| Fordham | 2 | – | 4 | 5 | – | 6 |
| Bucknell | 2 | – | 4 | 4 | – | 7 |
| Georgetown | 0 | – | 6 | 0 | – | 11 |
$ – Conference champion; ^ – FCS playoff participant; Rankings from The Sports Network poll

The 2009 Georgetown Hoyas football team was an American football team that represented Georgetown University in the 2009 NCAA Division I FCS football season. The team was led by Kevin Kelly, in his fourth season as head coach. The Hoyas played their home games at Multi-Sport Field in Washington, D.C. Georgetown failed to win a game, a first since 1885. However, they still filled their stadium past capacity for half their home games.

== Schedule ==
| Date | Time | Opponent | Site | TV | Result | Attendance | Source |
|---|---|---|---|---|---|---|---|
| September 5 | 1:00 PM | at No. 25 Holy Cross | Fitton Field; Worcester, MA | | L 7–20 | 5,897 | |
| September 12 | 6:00 PM | Lafayette | Multi-Sport Field; Washington, DC | | L 3–28 | 2,875 | |
| September 19 | 1:00 PM | Yale* | Multi-Sport Field; Washington, DC | | L 10–31 | 2,941 | |
| September 26 | 2:00 PM | Howard*^{†} | Multi-Sport Field; Washington, DC | | L 11–14 | 2,630 | |
| October 3 | 1:00 PM | at Bucknell | Christy Mathewson–Memorial Stadium; Lewisburg, PA | | L 6–14 | 1,860 | |
| October 10 | 12:30 PM | at Lehigh | Goodman Stadium; Bethlehem, PA | TV2 | L 0–27 | 5,789 | |
| October 17 | 1:00 p.m. | No. 17 Colgate | Multi-Sport Field; Washington, DC | | L 14–31 | 1,875 | |
| October 31 | 6:00 PM | at Old Dominion* | Foreman Field; Norfolk, VA | | L 10–31 | 19,782 | |
| November 7 | 1:00 PM | at Marist* | Leonidoff Field; Poughkeepsie, NY | | L 21–23 | 2,158 | |
| November 14 | 1:00 PM | No. 4 Richmond* | Multi-Sport Field; Washington, DC | | L 10–49 | 2,312 | |
| November 21 | 1:00 PM | Fordham | Multi-Sport Field; Washington, DC | | L 14–41 | 2,432 | |
*Non-conference game; ^{†}Homecoming; Rankings from The Sports Network Poll released prior to the game; All times are in Eastern time
