= 2009 Yale Bulldogs football team =

American college football season

2009 Yale Bulldogs football
- Conference: Ivy League
- Record: 4–6 (2–5 Ivy)
- Head coach: Tom Williams (1st season)
- Offensive coordinator: Brian Stark (1st season)
- Co-offensive coordinator: Kefense Hynson (1st season)
- Defensive coordinator: Ikaika Malloe (1st season)
- Home stadium: Yale Bowl

2009 Ivy League football standings
	Conf.			Overall
Team	W		L	W		L
No. 20 Penn $	7	–	0	8	–	2
Harvard	6	–	1	7	–	3
Brown	4	–	3	6	–	4
Columbia	3	–	4	4	–	6
Princeton	3	–	4	4	–	6
Yale	2	–	5	4	–	6
Dartmouth	2	–	5	2	–	8
Cornell	1	–	6	2	–	8
$ – Conference champion; Rankings from The Sports Network poll

The 2009 Yale Bulldogs football team represented Yale University in the 2009 NCAA Division I FCS football season. The Bulldogs were led by first-year head coach Tom Williams, played their home games at the Yale Bowl and finished tied for sixth place in the Ivy League with a 2–5 record, 4–6 overall. Yale averaged 21,245 fans in attendance per home game.

== Schedule ==
Date	Opponent	Site	Result	Attendance	Source
September 19	at Georgetown*	Multi-Sport Field; Washington, DC	W 31–10	2,941	
September 26	Cornell	Yale Bowl; New Haven, CT	L 12–14	17,654	
October 3	Lafayette*	Yale Bowl; New Haven, CT	L 14–31	3,879	
October 10	Dartmouth	Yale Bowl; New Haven, CT	W 38–7	15,773	
October 17	at Lehigh*	Goodman Stadium; Bethlehem, PA	W 7–0	5,847	
October 24	at Penn	Franklin Field; Philadelphia, PA	L 0–9	7,290	
October 31	at Columbia	Robert K. Kraft Field at Lawrence A. Wien Stadium; New York, NY	W 23–22	2,461	
November 7	Brown	Yale Bowl; New Haven, CT	L 21–35	16,228	
November 14	at Princeton	Powers Field at Princeton Stadium; Princeton, NJ (rivalry)	L 21–24	9,483	
November 21	Harvard	Yale Bowl; New Haven, CT (The Game)	L 10–14	52,692	
*Non-conference game
