= 2008 Rhode Island Rams football team =

American college football season

2008 Rhode Island Rams football
- Conference: Colonial Athletic Association
- North Division
- Record: 3–9 (1–7 CAA)
- Head coach: Darren Rizzi (1st season)
- Offensive coordinator: Chris Pincince (1st season)
- Defensive coordinator: Joe Trainer (1st season)
- Home stadium: Meade Stadium

2008 Colonial Athletic Association football standings
	Conf.			Overall
Team	W		L	W		L
North Division
No. 8 New Hampshire x^	6	–	2	10	–	3
No. 18 Maine ^	5	–	3	8	–	5
UMass	4	–	4	7	–	5
Hofstra	2	–	6	4	–	8
Rhode Island	1	–	7	3	–	9
Northeastern	1	–	7	2	–	10
South Division
No. 3 James Madison x$^	8	–	0	12	–	2
No. 6 Villanova ^	7	–	1	10	–	3
No. 1 Richmond ^	6	–	2	13	–	3
No. 20 William & Mary	5	–	3	7	–	4
Delaware	2	–	6	4	–	8
Towson	1	–	7	3	–	9
$ – Conference champion; x – Division champion/co-champions; ^ – FCS playoff participant; Rankings from The Sports Network poll

The 2008 Rhode Island Rams football team was an American football team that represented the University of Rhode Island in the Colonial Athletic Association (CAA) during the 2008 NCAA Division I FCS football season. In their first and only season under head coach Darren Rizzi, the Rams compiled a 3–9 record (1–7 against conference opponents) and tied for last place in the North Division of the CAA's North Division.

== Schedule ==
Date	Time	Opponent	Site	TV	Result	Attendance	Source
August 30	1:00 p.m.	Monmouth	Meade Stadium; Kingston, RI		W 27–24	3,220	
September 7		at Fordham	Coffey Field; Bronx, NY		L 0–16		
September 13	12:00 p.m.	No. 10 New Hampshire	Meade Stadium; Kingston, RI	CN8	L 43–51	4,113	
September 20	1:00 p.m.	at Hofstra	James M. Shuart Stadium; Hempstead, NY		L 20–23	6,107	
September 27	1:00 p.m.	at Boston College	Alumni Stadium; Chestnut Hill, MA	ESPN360	L 0–42	32,628	
October 4		Brown	Meade Stadium; Kingston, RI (rivalry)		W 37–13	6,014	
October 11	3:00 p.m.	at Towson	Johnny Unitas Stadium; Towson, MD		L 32–37	7,369	
October 18		No. 7 Villanova	Meade Stadium; Kingston, RI		L 7–44		
October 25	1:00 p.m.	at No. 23 William & Mary	Zable Stadium; Williamsburg, VA		L 24–34	9,383	
November 1	12:00 p.m.	No. 15 UMass	Meade Stadium; Kingston, RI		L 0–49	7,201	
November 15		No. 21 Maine	Meade Stadium; Kingston, RI		L 7–37		
November 22		at Northeastern	Brookline, MA		W 29–14		
Rankings from The Sports Network Poll released prior to the game; All times are in Eastern time

== Coaching staff ==
Rhode Island Rams
Name	Position	Consecutive season at Rhode Island in current position	Previous position
Darren Rizzi	Head coach	1st	Rutgers special teams coordinator (2002–2007)
Joe Trainer	Associate head coach and defensive coordinator	1st	Millersville head coach (2005–2007)
Chris Pincince	Offensive coordinator	1st	Holy Cross offensive coordinator (2006–2007)
Ryan Crawford	Defensive backs coach	1st	Bucknell defensive backs coach (2005–2007)
Mark Fabish	Quarterbacks coach and wide receivers coach	1st	Monmouth offensive coordinator (2002–2007)
Bob Griffin	Tight ends coach	1st	Holy Cross co-offensive coordinator (2004–2005)
Roy Istvan	Offensive line coach	1st	Milford Academy (NY) offensive coordinator (2006–2007)
Rob Neviaser	Defensive line coach	1st	Delaware defensive line coach (2002–2005)
Eddie Allen	Special teams coordinator and running backs coach	1st	Rutgers graduate assistant (2005–2007)
Tem Lukabu	Outside linebackers coach	1st	Rutgers director of player development (2006–2007)
