= 2008 Yale Bulldogs football team =

American college football season

2008 Yale Bulldogs football
- Conference: Ivy League
- Record: 6–4 (4–3 Ivy)
- Head coach: Jack Siedlecki (12th season)
- Home stadium: Yale Bowl

2008 Ivy League football standings
	Conf.			Overall
Team	W		L	W		L
No. 15 Harvard +	6	–	1	9	–	1
Brown +	6	–	1	7	–	3
Penn	5	–	2	6	–	4
Yale	4	–	3	6	–	4
Princeton	3	–	4	4	–	6
Cornell	2	–	5	4	–	6
Columbia	2	–	5	2	–	8
Dartmouth	0	–	7	0	–	10
+ – Conference co-champions; Rankings from The Sports Network poll

The 2008 Yale Bulldogs football team represented Yale University in the 2008 NCAA Division I FCS football season. Tale averaged 11,070 fans per game. The Bulldogs were led by 12th-year head coach Jack Siedlecki, played their home games at the Yale Bowl and finished tied for first place in the Ivy League with a 4–3 record, 6–4 overall.

== Schedule ==
Date	Opponent	Site	Result	Attendance	Source
September 20	Georgetown*	Yale Bowl; New Haven, CT	W 47–7	12,771	
September 27	at Cornell	Schoellkopf Field; Ithaca, NY	L 14–17	13,142	
October 4	Holy Cross*	Yale Bowl; New Haven, CT	W 31–28	14,512	
October 11	at Dartmouth	Memorial Field; Hanover, NH	W 34–7	7,411	
October 18	at Fordham*	Coffey Field; Bronx, NY	L 10–12	6,873	
October 25	Penn	Yale Bowl; New Haven, CT	L 7–9	10,490	
November 1	Columbia	Yale Bowl; New Haven, CT	W 27–12	11,870	
November 8	at Brown	Brown Stadium; Providence, RI	W 13–3	9,010	
November 15	Princeton	Yale Bowl; New Haven, CT (rivalry)	W 14–0	5,711	
November 22	at Harvard	Harvard Stadium; Boston, MA (The Game)	L 0–10	31,398	
*Non-conference game
