= 2008 Holy Cross Crusaders football team =

American college football season

2008 Holy Cross Crusaders football
- Conference: Patriot League
- Record: 7–4 (5–1 Patriot)
- Head coach: Tom Gilmore (5th season)
- Offensive coordinator: Andy McKenzie (1st season)
- Defensive coordinator: Richard Rodgers Sr. (3rd season)
- Captains: Daryl Brown; Dominic Randolph
- Home stadium: Fitton Field

2008 Patriot League football standings
	Conf.			Overall
Team	W		L	W		L
No. 16 Colgate $^	5	–	0	9	–	3
Holy Cross	5	–	1	7	–	4
Lehigh	4	–	2	5	–	6
Lafayette	3	–	3	7	–	4
Bucknell	2	–	4	5	–	6
Fordham	1	–	5	5	–	6
Georgetown	0	–	5	2	–	8
$ – Conference champion; ^ – FCS playoff participant; Rankings from The Sports Network poll

The 2008 Holy Cross Crusaders football team was an American football team that represented the College of the Holy Cross during the 2008 NCAA Division I FCS football season. Holy Cross finished second in the Patriot League.

In their fifth year under head coach Tom Gilmore, the Crusaders compiled a 7–4 record. Daryl Brown and Dominic Randolph were the team captains.

The Crusaders outscored opponents 378 to 284. Their 5–1 conference record placed just half a game behind first place in the seven-team Patriot League standings.

Holy Cross played its home games at Fitton Field on the college campus in Worcester, Massachusetts.

== Schedule ==
Date	Opponent	Site	Result	Attendance	Source
September 6	No. 4 UMass^{†}*	Fitton Field; Worcester, MA	L 42–45	12,781	
September 19	at Harvard*	Harvard Stadium; Boston, MA	L 24–25	20,462	
September 27	at Georgetown	Multi-Sport Field; Washington, DC	W 38–14	2,233	
October 4	at Yale*	Yale Bowl; New Haven, CT	L 28–31 ^{2OT}	14,512	
October 11	Brown*	Fitton Field; Worcester, MA	W 41–34	7,493	
October 18	at Dartmouth*	Memorial Field; Hanover, NH	W 44–26	7,518	
October 25	Lehigh^	Fitton Field; Worcester, MA	W 35–21	11,558	
November 1	Bucknell	Fitton Field; Worcester, MA	W 34–17		
November 8	Fordham	Fitton Field; Worcester, MA (rivalry)	W 38–17	6,277	
November 15	at Lafayette	Fisher Stadium; Easton, PA	W 27–26	7,439	
November 22	at No. 21 Colgate	Andy Kerr Stadium; Hamilton, NY	L 27–28	4,862	
*Non-conference game; ^{†}Homecoming; ^ Family Weekend; Rankings from The Sports Network Poll released prior to the game
