= 2008 Princeton Tigers football team =

American college football season

2008 Princeton Tigers football
- Conference: Ivy League
- Record: 4–6 (3–4 Ivy)
- Head coach: Roger Hughes (9th season)
- Home stadium: Powers Field at Princeton Stadium

2008 Ivy League football standings
	Conf.			Overall
Team	W		L	W		L
No. 15 Harvard +	6	–	1	9	–	1
Brown +	6	–	1	7	–	3
Penn	5	–	2	6	–	4
Yale	4	–	3	6	–	4
Princeton	3	–	4	4	–	6
Cornell	2	–	5	4	–	6
Columbia	2	–	5	2	–	8
Dartmouth	0	–	7	0	–	10
+ – Conference co-champions; Rankings from The Sports Network poll

The 2008 Princeton Tigers football team was an American football team that represented Princeton University in the 2008 NCAA Division I FCS football season. Princeton averaged 9,383 fans per game.

The Tigers played their home games at Powers Field at Princeton Stadium on the university campus in Princeton, New Jersey.

== Schedule ==
Date	Opponent	Site	Result	Attendance	Source
September 20	at The Citadel*	Johnson Hagood Stadium; Charleston, SC	L 24–37	13,120	
September 27	at Lehigh	Powers Field at Princeton Stadium; Princeton, NJ	W 10–7	8,836	
October 4	Columbia	Robert K. Kraft Field at Lawrence A. Wien Stadium; New York, NY	W 27–24	8,733	
October 11	at Colgate	Andy Kerr Stadium; Hamilton, NY	L 24–27	4,688	
October 18	at Brown	Powers Field at Princeton Stadium; Princeton, NJ	L 10–31	11,814	
October 25	at No. 25 Harvard	Powers Field at Princeton Stadium; Princeton, NJ	L 20–24	10,189	
November 1	at Cornell	Schoellkopf Field; Ithaca, NY	W 31–26	7,122	
November 7	at Penn	Powers Field at Princeton Stadium; Princeton, NJ	L 9–14	8,966	
November 15	Yale	Yale Bowl; New Haven, CT	L 0–14	5,711	
November 22	Dartmouth	Powers Field at Princeton Stadium; Princeton, NJ	W 28–10	7,113	
*Non-conference game; Rankings from The Sports Network Poll released prior to the game
