= 2008 Penn Quakers football team =

American college football season

2008 Penn Quakers football
- Conference: Ivy League
- Record: 6–4 (5–2 Ivy)
- Head coach: Al Bagnoli (17th season)
- Defensive coordinator: Ray Priore (11th season)
- Home stadium: Franklin Field

2008 Ivy League football standings
	Conf.			Overall
Team	W		L	W		L
No. 15 Harvard +	6	–	1	9	–	1
Brown +	6	–	1	7	–	3
Penn	5	–	2	6	–	4
Yale	4	–	3	6	–	4
Princeton	3	–	4	4	–	6
Cornell	2	–	5	4	–	6
Columbia	2	–	5	2	–	8
Dartmouth	0	–	7	0	–	10
+ – Conference co-champions; Rankings from The Sports Network poll

The 2008 Penn Quakers football team was an American football team that represented the University of Pennsylvania in the 2008 NCAA Division I FCS football season. It was the 132nd season of play for the Quakers. The team was led by Al Bagnoli, in his 17th season as head coach. The Quakers played their home games at historic Franklin Field on the university campus in Philadelphia. Penn averaged 11,284 fans per game.

== Schedule ==
Date	Time	Opponent	Site	TV	Result	Attendance	Source
September 20	3:30 pm	No. 19 Villanova*	Franklin Field; Philadelphia, PA	Comcast	L 14–20 ^{OT}	14,758	
September 27	6:00 pm	at Lafayette*	Fisher Stadium; Easton, PA	WBPH	L 17–24	7,561	
October 4	Noon	Dartmouth	Franklin Field; Philadelphia, PA	Comcast	W 23–10	12,433	
October 11	2:00 pm	at Georgetown*	Multi-Sport Field; Washington, DC		W 27–7	3,135	
October 18	1:00 pm	Columbia	Franklin Field; Philadelphia, PA		W 15–10	6,821	
October 25	12:30 pm	at Yale	Yale Bowl; New Haven, CT	YES	W 9–7	10,490	
November 1	Noon	Brown^{†}	Franklin Field; Philadelphia, PA	Versus	L 27–34	15,056	
November 7	7:00 pm	at Princeton	Powers Field at Princeton Stadium; Princeton, NJ (rivalry)	ESPNU	W 14–9	8,966	
November 15	Noon	No. 19 Harvard	Franklin Field; Philadelphia, PA (rivalry)	Comcast	L 21–24	7,352	
November 22	1:00 pm	at Cornell	Schoellkopf Field; Ithaca, NY (rivalry)		W 23–6	2,437	
*Non-conference game; ^{†}Homecoming; Rankings from The Sports Network Poll released prior to the game; All times are in Eastern time
