= 2008 Cornell Big Red football team =

American college football season

2008 Cornell Big Red football
- Conference: Ivy League
- Record: 4–6 (2–5 Ivy)
- Head coach: Jim Knowles (5th season)
- Offensive coordinator: Bruce Barnum (2nd season)
- Offensive scheme: Pistol
- Defensive coordinator: Clayton Carlin (2nd season)
- Base defense: 4–3
- Captains: Tommy Bleymaier; Nathan Ford; Graham Rihn
- Home stadium: Schoellkopf Field

2008 Ivy League football standings
	Conf.			Overall
Team	W		L	W		L
No. 15 Harvard +	6	–	1	9	–	1
Brown +	6	–	1	7	–	3
Penn	5	–	2	6	–	4
Yale	4	–	3	6	–	4
Princeton	3	–	4	4	–	6
Cornell	2	–	5	4	–	6
Columbia	2	–	5	2	–	8
Dartmouth	0	–	7	0	–	10
+ – Conference co-champions; Rankings from The Sports Network poll

The 2008 Cornell Big Red football team was an American football team that represented Cornell University in the 2008 NCAA Division I FCS football season. They were led by fifth-year head coach Jim Knowles and played their home games at Schoellkopf Field in Ithaca, New York. Cornell finished the season 4–6, 2–5 in Ivy League play, to finish in sixth place. Cornell averaged 7,075 fans per game.

== Schedule ==
Date	Time	Opponent	Site	TV	Result	Attendance	Source
September 20	6:00 p.m.	at Bucknell*	Christy Mathewson–Memorial Stadium; Lewisburg, PA		W 21–20	5,173	
September 27	1:00 p.m.	Yale^{†}	Schoellkopf Field; Ithaca, NY		W 17–14	13,142	
October 4	12:30 p.m.	at Lehigh*	Goodman Stadium; Bethlehem, PA		W 25–24	10,460	
October 11	12:00 p.m.	at Harvard	Harvard Stadium; Boston, MA	Versus	L 17–38	11,263	
October 18	1:00 p.m.	Colgate*	Schoellkopf Field; Ithaca, NY (rivalry)		L 22–38	8,542	
October 25	12:30 p.m.	at Brown	Brown Stadium; Providence, RI		L 7–27	9,298	
November 1	1:00 p.m.	Princeton	Schoellkopf Field; Ithaca, NY		L 26–31	7,122	
November 8	1:00 p.m.	Dartmouth	Schoellkopf Field; Ithaca, NY (rivalry)		W 37–14	4,132	
November 15	12:30 p.m.	at Columbia	Robert K. Kraft Field at Lawrence A. Wien Stadium; New York, NY (rivalry)		L 7–17	3,811	
November 22	1:00 p.m.	Penn	Schoellkopf Field; Ithaca, NY (rivalry)		L 6–23	2,437	
*Non-conference game; ^{†}Homecoming; All times are in Eastern time
