= Dave Cohen (American football) =

American football player and coach (born 1966)

Biographical details
- Born: October 6, 1966 (age 60); Huntington, New York, U.S.

Playing career
- 1984–1987: C. W. Post
- Position: Defensive tackle

Coaching career (HC unless noted)
- 1988–1990: Albany (LB)
- 1991–1993: Lafayette (LB)
- 1994–1998: Delaware (LB)
- 1999–2001: Fordham (DC)
- 2002–2005: Delaware (DC)
- 2006–2009: Hofstra
- 2010–2011: Western Michigan (DC)
- 2012: Rutgers (LB)
- 2013: Rutgers (DC)
- 2014–2017: Wake Forest (DL)
- 2018–2025: Wake Forest (AHC/DL)

Head coaching record
- Overall: 18–27

David Marc Cohen (born October 6, 1966) is an American college football coach. He is the assistant head football coach and defensive line coach at Wake Forest University. Cohen came to Wake after stint as the defensive coordinator at Rutgers University in 2013. He was formerly the defensive coordinator for the Western Michigan Broncos football team and the final head coach of Hofstra University's football program. He coached the Pride from 2006 through 2009, when Hofstra announced that it was dropping football due to economic and popularity considerations, just days after the season. In his five seasons as head coach, Cohen compiled an 18–27 overall record.

== Personal life ==
Cohen was born in Huntington, New York, and attended Commack High School in Long Island, New York from 1980 to 1984. He attended Long Island University C.W. Post Campus from 1984 to 1988 where he earned a bachelor's degree in business management. Cohen received his master's degree in education administration from the University of Albany in 1990.

Cohen is married to his wife Denise and have two children, Charlie and Brian.

== Head coaching record ==
Year	Team	Overall	Conference	Standing	Bowl/playoffs
Hofstra Pride (Atlantic 10 Conference) (2006)
2006	Hofstra	2–9	1–7	6th (North)	
Hofstra Pride (Colonial Athletic Association) (2007–2009)
2007	Hofstra	7–4	4–4	T–2nd (North)	
2008	Hofstra	4–8	2–6	4th (North)	
2009	Hofstra	5–6	3–5	T–3rd (North)	
Hofstra:		18–27	10–22		
Total:		18–27			
