= 2008 Bucknell Bison football team =

American college football season

2008 Bucknell Bison football
- Conference: Patriot League
- Record: 5–6 (2–4 Patriot)
- Head coach: Tim Landis (6th season)
- Captains: Greg Jones; A.J. Kizekai; Kevin Mullen; Casey Williams
- Home stadium: Christy Mathewson–Memorial Stadium

2008 Patriot League football standings
	Conf.			Overall
Team	W		L	W		L
No. 16 Colgate $^	5	–	0	9	–	3
Holy Cross	5	–	1	7	–	4
Lehigh	4	–	2	5	–	6
Lafayette	3	–	3	7	–	4
Bucknell	2	–	4	5	–	6
Fordham	1	–	5	5	–	6
Georgetown	0	–	5	2	–	8
$ – Conference champion; ^ – FCS playoff participant; Rankings from The Sports Network poll

The 2008 Bucknell Bison football team was an American football team that represented Bucknell University during the 2008 NCAA Division I FCS football season. It finished fifth in the Patriot League.

Bucknell played its home games at Christy Mathewson–Memorial Stadium on the university campus in Lewisburg, Pennsylvania.

In its sixth season under head coach Tim Landis, the Bison compiled a 5–6 record. Greg Jones, A.J. Kizekai, Kevin Mullen and Casey Williams were the team captains.

The Bison were outscored 339 to 269. Their 2–4 conference record placed fifth in the seven-team Patriot League standings.

== Schedule ==
Date	Opponent	Site	Result	Attendance	Source
September 6	Duquesne*	Christy Mathewson–Memorial Stadium; Lewisburg, PA	W 48–42	2,918	
September 13	at Robert Morris*	Joe Walton Stadium; Moon Township, PA	W 17–14	2,347	
September 20	Cornell*	Christy Mathewson–Memorial Stadium; Lewisburg, PA	L 20–21	5,173	
October 4	at Marist*	Leonidoff Field; Poughkeepsie, NY	W 21–17	3,522	
October 11	Hofstra*	Christy Mathewson–Memorial Stadium; Lewisburg, PA	L 31–45	2,444	
October 18	at Georgetown	Multi-Purpose Field; Washington, DC	W 27–24		
October 25	Colgate^{†}	Christy Mathewson–Memorial Stadium; Lewisburg, PA	L 28–52		
November 1	at Holy Cross	Fitton Field; Worcester, MA	L 17–34		
November 8	Lafayette	Christy Mathewson–Memorial Stadium; Lewisburg, PA	L 21–38	1,979	
November 15	at Lehigh	Goodman Stadium; Bethlehem, PA	L 15–31	4,659	
November 22	Fordham	Christy Mathewson–Memorial Stadium; Lewisburg, PA	W 24–21 ^{OT}	837	
*Non-conference game; ^{†}Homecoming; ^ Parents Weekend
