= 2008 Fordham Rams football team =

American college football season

2008 Fordham Rams football
- Conference: Patriot League
- Record: 5–6 (1–5 Patriot)
- Head coach: Tom Masella (3rd season)
- Defensive coordinator: Frank Forcucci (3rd season)
- Captains: James Crockett; Fonzie Culver; Greg DeMarco; Matt Loucks; Richard Rayborn; John Skelton
- Home stadium: Coffey Field

2008 Patriot League football standings
	Conf.			Overall
Team	W		L	W		L
No. 16 Colgate $^	5	–	0	9	–	3
Holy Cross	5	–	1	7	–	4
Lehigh	4	–	2	5	–	6
Lafayette	3	–	3	7	–	4
Bucknell	2	–	4	5	–	6
Fordham	1	–	5	5	–	6
Georgetown	0	–	5	2	–	8
$ – Conference champion; ^ – FCS playoff participant; Rankings from The Sports Network poll

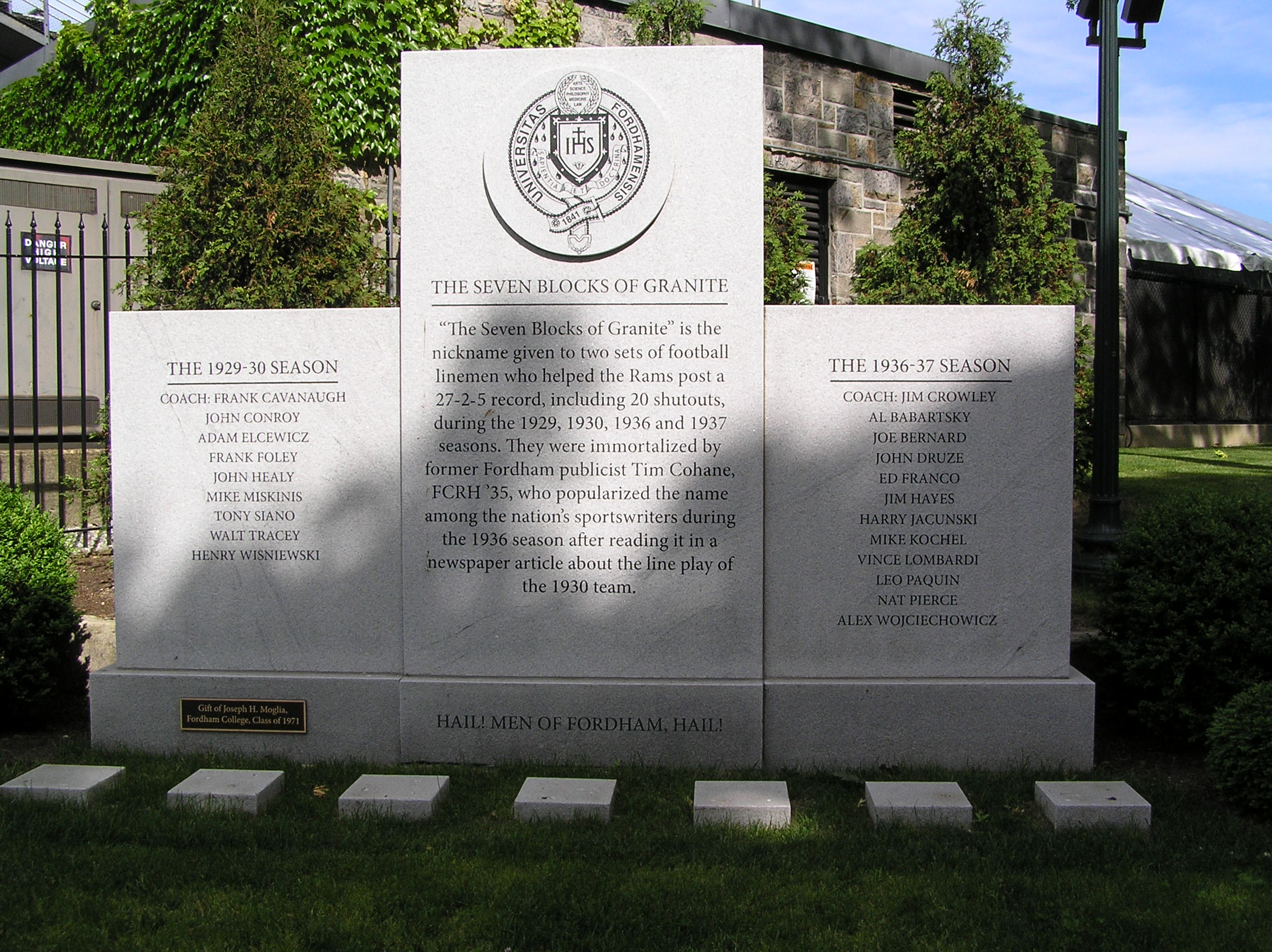
The Seven Blocks of Granite Monument, west of Coffey Field grandstand

The 2008 Fordham Rams football team was an American football team that represented Fordham University during the 2008 NCAA Division I FCS football season. Fordham finished second-to-last in the Patriot League, a year after winning the league title.

In their third year under head coach Tom Masella, the Rams compiled a 5–6 record. James Crockett, Fonzie Culver, Greg DeMarco, Matt Loucks, Richard Rayborn and John Skelton were the team captains.

The Rams were outscored 262 to 238; their 1–5 conference record placed sixth out of seven in the Patriot League standings.

Fordham played its home games at Jack Coffey Field on the university's Rose Hill campus in The Bronx, in New York City.

An on-campus monument to the Seven Blocks of Granite was dedicated on October 24, honoring the offensive lines of 1929, 1930, 1936, and 1937. It is located on Constitution Row, near the west end of the grandstand of Coffey Field.

== Schedule ==
Date	Opponent	Site	Result	Attendance	Source
September 7	Rhode Island*	Coffey Field; Bronx, NY	W 16–0		
September 13	at Dayton*	Welcome Stadium; Dayton, OH	L 20–23	3,348	
September 20	at Columbia*	Robert K. Kraft Field at Lawrence A. Wien Stadium; New York, NY (Liberty Cup)	L 22–29	2,304	
September 27	Colgate	Coffey Field; Bronx, NY	L 24–31	3,112	
October 11	at Lehigh	Goodman Stadium; Bethlehem, PA	L 24–45	7,043	
October 18	Yale*	Coffey Field; Bronx, NY	W 12–10	6,873	
October 25	No. 24 Lafayette^{†}	Coffey Field; Bronx, NY	L 13–48	3,706	
November 1	Marist*	Coffey Field; Bronx, NY	W 45–21	3,649	
November 8	at Holy Cross	Fitton Field; Worcester, MA (rivalry)	L 17–38	6,277	
November 15	Georgetown	Coffey Field; Bronx, NY	W 17–0	2,758	
November 22	at Bucknell	Christy Mathewson–Memorial Stadium; Lewisburg, PA	L 21–24 ^{OT}	837	
*Non-conference game; ^{†}Homecoming; Rankings from The Sports Network Poll released prior to the game
