= 2008 Towson Tigers football team =

American college football season

2008 Towson Tigers football
- Conference: Colonial Athletic Association
- Record: 3–9 (1–7 CAA)
- Head coach: Gordy Combs (17th season)
- Home stadium: Johnny Unitas Stadium

2008 Colonial Athletic Association football standings
	Conf.			Overall
Team	W		L	W		L
North Division
No. 8 New Hampshire x^	6	–	2	10	–	3
No. 18 Maine ^	5	–	3	8	–	5
UMass	4	–	4	7	–	5
Hofstra	2	–	6	4	–	8
Rhode Island	1	–	7	3	–	9
Northeastern	1	–	7	2	–	10
South Division
No. 3 James Madison x$^	8	–	0	12	–	2
No. 6 Villanova ^	7	–	1	10	–	3
No. 1 Richmond ^	6	–	2	13	–	3
No. 20 William & Mary	5	–	3	7	–	4
Delaware	2	–	6	4	–	8
Towson	1	–	7	3	–	9
$ – Conference champion; x – Division champion/co-champions; ^ – FCS playoff participant; Rankings from The Sports Network poll

The 2008 Towson Tigers football team represented Towson University in the 2008 NCAA Division I FCS football season. They were led by 17th-year head coach Gordy Combs and played their home games at Johnny Unitas Stadium. They are a member of the Colonial Athletic Association. They finished the season 3–9, 1–7 in CAA play.

== Schedule ==
Date	Time	Opponent	Site	TV	Result	Attendance	Source
August 30	3:30 pm	at Navy*	Navy–Marine Corps Memorial Stadium; Annapolis, MD		L 13–41	31,613	
September 6	6:00 pm	Morgan State*	Johnny Unitas Stadium; Towson, MD (The Battle for Greater Baltimore)		W 21–16	4,705	
September 13	3:00 pm	at No. 4 Richmond	City Stadium; Richmond, VA		L 14–45	8,012	
September 20	7:00 pm	at Coastal Carolina*	Brooks Stadium; Conway, SC		L 3–31	8,204	
September 27	3:00 pm	Columbia*	Johnny Unitas Stadium; Towson, MD		W 31–24	5,030	
October 4	12:00 pm	Northeastern	Johnny Unitas Stadium; Towson, MD		L 17–35		
October 11	3:00 pm	Rhode Island^{†}	Johnny Unitas Stadium; Towson, MD		W 37–32	7,369	
October 25	12:00 pm	at No. 10 New Hampshire	Cowell Stadium; Durham, NH	Comcast SportsNet	L 14–42	8,003	
November 1	12:00 pm	No. 16 William & Mary	Johnny Unitas Stadium; Towson, MD	Comcast SportsNet	L 14–34	3,168	
November 8	12:00 pm	at Delaware	Delaware Stadium; Newark, DE		L 21–31	20,720	
November 15	1:00 pm	at No. 6 Villanova	Villanova Stadium; Villanova, PA		L 31–34	5,101	
November 22	1:00 pm	No. 1 James Madison	Johnny Unitas Stadium; Towson, MD		L 27–58	5,575	
*Non-conference game; ^{†}Homecoming; Rankings from The Sports Network Poll released prior to the game; All times are in Eastern time
