= 2008 Dartmouth Big Green football team =

American college football season

2008 Dartmouth Big Green football
- Conference: Ivy League
- Record: 0–10 (0–7 Ivy)
- Head coach: Buddy Teevens (9th season)
- Captains: Andrew Dete; Alex Rapp; Milan Williams
- Home stadium: Memorial Field

2008 Ivy League football standings
| | Conf. | | | Overall |
| Team | W | | L | W | | L |
|---|---|---|---|---|---|---|
| No. 15 Harvard + | 6 | – | 1 | 9 | – | 1 |
| Brown + | 6 | – | 1 | 7 | – | 3 |
| Penn | 5 | – | 2 | 6 | – | 4 |
| Yale | 4 | – | 3 | 6 | – | 4 |
| Princeton | 3 | – | 4 | 4 | – | 6 |
| Cornell | 2 | – | 5 | 4 | – | 6 |
| Columbia | 2 | – | 5 | 2 | – | 8 |
| Dartmouth | 0 | – | 7 | 0 | – | 10 |
+ – Conference co-champions; Rankings from The Sports Network poll

The 2008 Dartmouth Big Green football team was an American football team that represented Dartmouth College during the 2008 NCAA Division I FCS football season. The Big Green finished last in the Ivy League.

In its fourth consecutive season under head coach Eugene "Buddy" Teevens (his ninth overall), the team compiled an 0–10 record and was outscored 343 to 129. Dartmouth averaged 5,096 fans per game.Andrew Dete, Alex Rapp and Milan Williams were the team captains.

The Big Green's winless (0–7) conference record was the worst in the Ivy League standings. Dartmouth was outscored 223 to 77 by Ivy opponents.

Dartmouth played its home games at Memorial Field on the college campus in Hanover, New Hampshire.

== Schedule ==
| Date | Time | Opponent | Site | TV | Result | Attendance | Source |
|---|---|---|---|---|---|---|---|
| September 20 | | at Colgate* | Andy Kerr Stadium; Hamilton, NY | | L 20–34 | 5,235 | |
| September 27 | 12:00 p.m. | No. 7 New Hampshire* | Memorial Field; Hanover, NH (rivalry) | WMUR | L 6–42 | 4,227 | |
| October 4 | 12:00 p.m. | at Penn | Franklin Field; Philadelphia, PA | Comcast | L 10–23 | 12,433 | |
| October 11 | | Yale | Memorial Field; Hanover, NH | | L 7–34 | 7,411 | |
| October 18 | | Holy Cross^{†}* | Memorial Field; Hanover, NH | | L 26–44 | 7,518 | |
| October 25 | | at Columbia | Robert K. Kraft Field at Lawrence A. Wien Stadium; New York, NY | | L 13–21 | 2.161 | |
| November 1 | | No. 23 Harvard | Memorial Field; Hanover, NH (rivalry) | | L 7–35 | 4,111 | |
| November 8 | 1:00 p.m. | at Cornell | Schoellkopf Field; Ithaca, NY (rivalry) | | L 14–37 | 4,132 | |
| November 15 | | Brown | Memorial Field; Hanover, NH | | L 16–45 | 2,215 | |
| November 22 | | at Princeton | Powers Field at Princeton Stadium; Princeton, NJ | | L 10–28 | 7,113 | |
*Non-conference game; ^{†}Homecoming; Rankings from The Sports Network Poll released prior to the game; All times are in Eastern time
