= 2008 Hofstra Pride football team =

American college football season

2008 Hofstra Pride football
- Conference: Colonial Athletic Association
- North Division
- Record: 4–8 (2–6 CAA)
- Head coach: Dave Cohen (3rd season)
- Offensive coordinator: Dave Patenaude (1st season)
- Defensive coordinator: Mike Elko (3rd season)
- Home stadium: James M. Shuart Stadium

2008 Colonial Athletic Association football standings
	Conf.			Overall
Team	W		L	W		L
North Division
No. 8 New Hampshire x^	6	–	2	10	–	3
No. 18 Maine ^	5	–	3	8	–	5
UMass	4	–	4	7	–	5
Hofstra	2	–	6	4	–	8
Rhode Island	1	–	7	3	–	9
Northeastern	1	–	7	2	–	10
South Division
No. 3 James Madison x$^	8	–	0	12	–	2
No. 6 Villanova ^	7	–	1	10	–	3
No. 1 Richmond ^	6	–	2	13	–	3
No. 20 William & Mary	5	–	3	7	–	4
Delaware	2	–	6	4	–	8
Towson	1	–	7	3	–	9
$ – Conference champion; x – Division champion/co-champions; ^ – FCS playoff participant; Rankings from The Sports Network poll

The 2008 Hofstra Pride football team represented Hofstra University as a member of the North Division of the Colonial Athletic Association during the 2008 NCAA Division I FCS football season. Led by third-year head coach Dave Cohen, the Pride compiled an overall record of 4–8 with a mark of 2–6 in conference play, placing in fourth in the CAA's North Division. Hofstra played home games at James M. Shuart Stadium in Hempstead, New York.

== Schedule ==
Date	Time	Opponent	Site	TV	Result	Attendance	Source
August 28	7:00 p.m.	at Connecticut*	Rentschler Field; East Hartford, CT	ESPN+	L 3–35	37,583	
September 13	7:00 p.m.	Albany*	James M. Shuart Stadium; Hempstead, NY		L 16–22 ^{OT}	5,111	
September 20	1:00 p.m.	Rhode Island^{†}	James M. Shuart Stadium; Hempstead, NY		W 23–20	6,107	
September 26	7:00 p.m.	at Stony Brook*	Kenneth P. LaValle Stadium; Stony Brook, NY (rivalry)		L 43–3	2,105	
October 4	1:30 p.m.	at No. 1 James Madison	Bridgeforth Stadium; Harrisonburg, VA		L 0–56	16,109	
October 11	1:00 p.m.	at Bucknell*	Christy Mathewson–Memorial Stadium; Lewisburg, PA		W 45–31	2,444	
October 18	3:00 p.m.	at Maine	Alfond Stadium; Oreno, ME		L 40–41 ^{2OT}	3,690	
October 25	3:00 p.m.	Delaware	James H. Shuart Stadium; Hempstead, NY		L 0–17	3,518	
November 1	12:00 p.m.	at No. 9 New Hampshire	Cowell Stadium; Durham, NH		L 25–45	5,297	
November 8	1:00 p.m.	No. 7 Richmond	James H. Shuart Stadium; Hempstead, NY		L 14–34	1,766	
November 15	1:00 p.m.	Northeastern	James H. Shuart Stadium; Hempstead, NY		W 42–15	1,520	
November 22	2:30 p.m.	at UMass*	Warren McGuirk Alumni Stadium; Amherst, MA	CN8	L 14–28	5,108	
*Non-conference game; ^{†}Homecoming; Rankings from AP Poll released prior to the game; All times are in Eastern time

== Coaching staff ==
Hofstra Pride
Name	Position	Consecutive season at Hofstra in current position	Previous position
Dave Cohen	Head coach	3rd	Delaware defensive coordinator (2002–2005)
Mike Elko	Assistant head coach, defensive coordinator, and linebackers coach	1st	Hofstra defensive coordinator and linebackers coach (2007)
Dave Patenaude	Offensive coordinator and quarterbacks coach	1st	Hofstra quarterbacks coach (2007)
Lyle Hemphill	Special teams coordinator and defensive backs coach	1st	Hofstra defensive backs coach (2007)
Bill Durkin	Offensive line coach	1st	Richmond offensive line coach (2004–2007)
Kevin Baumann	Tight ends coach	2nd	Hofstra defensive assistant (2006)
Antonio Smikle	Running backs coach	2nd	Rutgers quality control coach (2005–2006)
Malik Hall	Defensive line coach	2nd	Fordham defensive line coach and assistant special teams coordinator (2006)
Kahmal Roy	Wide receivers coach	1st	Hofstra assistant defensive backs coach (2007)
Kevin Mapp	Defensive ends coach	1st	Hofstra defensive assistant (2007)
Kyle Smith	Assistant defensive backs coach	1st	Deer Park HS (NY) special teams coordinator, wide receivers coach, and defensive backs coach (2006)
