= Andy Coen =

American football coach (1964–2022)

Biographical details
- Born: June 20, 1964
- Died: April 15, 2022 (aged 57)
- Education: Gettysburg ('86)

Coaching career (HC unless noted)
- 1986: Widener (asst OL)
- 1987: James Madison (GA/OL)
- 1988–1989: Minnesota (GA/OL)
- 1990–1993: Merchant Marine (OC)
- 1994–1995: Lehigh (OL)
- 1996–1999: Lehigh (OC/OL)
- 2000–2005: Penn (OC/OL)
- 2006–2018: Lehigh

Head coaching record
- Overall: 85–64
- Tournaments: 2–4 (FCS playoffs)

Accomplishments and honors

Championships
- 5 Patriot (2006, 2010–11, 2016-17)

Andy Coen (June 20, 1964 – April 15, 2022) was an American college football coach. He was the head coach of the Lehigh University Mountain Hawks football team in Bethlehem, Pennsylvania, a position he held from 2006 until 2018.

Coen grew up in Cherry Hill, New Jersey and graduated from Cherry Hill High School East in 1982.

Coen stepped down from his role as the head coach at Lehigh in 2018 after he was diagnosed with early-onset Alzheimer's disease.

== Head coaching record ==
Year	Team	Overall	Conference	Standing	Bowl/playoffs	TSN/STATS^{#}	Coaches^{°}
Lehigh Mountain Hawks (Patriot League) (2006–2018)
2006	Lehigh	6–5	5–1	T–1st			
2007	Lehigh	5–6	2–4	5th			
2008	Lehigh	5–6	4–2	3rd			
2009	Lehigh	4–7	4–2	T–2nd			
2010	Lehigh	10–3	5–0	1st	L NCAA Division I Quarterfinal	14	14
2011	Lehigh	11–2	6–0	1st	L NCAA Division I Quarterfinal	6	6
2012	Lehigh	10–1	5–1	2nd		13	10
2013	Lehigh	8–3	3–2	T–2nd			
2014	Lehigh	3–8	2–4	T–5th			
2015	Lehigh	6–5	4–2	3rd			
2016	Lehigh	9–3	6–0	1st	L NCAA Division I First Round	21	18
2017	Lehigh	5–7	5–1	T–1st	L NCAA Division I First Round		
2018	Lehigh	3–8	2–4	T–4th			
Lehigh:		85–64	53–23				
Total:		85–64					
National championship Conference title Conference division title or championship game berth
