= 2008 Lehigh Mountain Hawks football team =

American college football season

2008 Lehigh Mountain Hawks football
- Conference: Patriot League
- Record: 5–6 (4–2 Patriot)
- Head coach: Andy Coen (3rd season)
- Offensive coordinator: Trey Brown (3rd season)
- Captains: Kevin Bayani; Tim Diamond; Matt McGowan; Brendan VanAckeren
- Home stadium: Goodman Stadium

2008 Patriot League football standings
	Conf.			Overall
Team	W		L	W		L
No. 16 Colgate $^	5	–	0	9	–	3
Holy Cross	5	–	1	7	–	4
Lehigh	4	–	2	5	–	6
Lafayette	3	–	3	7	–	4
Bucknell	2	–	4	5	–	6
Fordham	1	–	5	5	–	6
Georgetown	0	–	5	2	–	8
$ – Conference champion; ^ – FCS playoff participant; Rankings from The Sports Network poll

The 2008 Lehigh Mountain Hawks football team was an American football team that represented Lehigh University during the 2008 NCAA Division I FCS football season. Lehigh finished third in the Patriot League.

In their third year under head coach Andy Coen, the Mountain Hawks compiled a 5–6 record. Kevin Bayani, Tim Diamond, Matt McGowan and Brendan VanAckeren were the team captains.

The Mountain Hawks outscored opponents 282 to 231. Their 4–2 conference record placed third out of seven in the Patriot League standings.

Lehigh played its home games at Goodman Stadium on the university's Goodman Campus in Bethlehem, Pennsylvania.

== Schedule ==
Date	Opponent	Site	Result	Attendance	Source
September 6	Drake*	Goodman Stadium; Bethlehem, PA	W 19–0	4,706	
September 13	at No. 21 Villanova*	Villanova Stadium; Villanova, PA	L 14–33	11,101	
September 27	Princeton*	Powers Field at Princeton Stadium; Princeton, NJ	L 7–10	8,836	
October 4	Cornell*	Goodman Stadium; Bethlehem, PA	L 24–25	10,460	
October 11	Fordham	Goodman Stadium; Bethlehem, PA	W 45–24	7,043	
October 18	at Harvard*	Harvard Stadium; Boston, MA	L 24–27	11,242	
October 25	at Holy Cross	Fitton Field; Worcester, MA	L 21–35	11,558	
November 1	at Georgetown	Multi-Sport Field; Washington, DC	W 33–13		
November 8	No. 24 Colgate	Goodman Stadium; Bethlehem, PA	L 33–34	10,841	
November 15	Bucknell	Goodman Stadium; Bethlehem, PA	W 31–15	4,659	
November 22	at Lafayette	Fisher Stadium; Easton, PA (The Rivalry)	W 31–15	15,908	
*Non-conference game; Rankings from The Sports Network Poll released prior to the game
