= 2008 Georgetown Hoyas football team =

American college football season

2008 Georgetown Hoyas football
- Conference: Patriot League
- Record: 2–8 (0–5 Patriot)
- Head coach: Kevin Kelly (3rd season)
- Defensive coordinator: Rob Sgarlata (3rd season)
- Captains: Daniel Matheny; Nicholas Umar
- Home stadium: Multi-Sport Field

2008 Patriot League football standings
	Conf.			Overall
Team	W		L	W		L
No. 16 Colgate $^	5	–	0	9	–	3
Holy Cross	5	–	1	7	–	4
Lehigh	4	–	2	5	–	6
Lafayette	3	–	3	7	–	4
Bucknell	2	–	4	5	–	6
Fordham	1	–	5	5	–	6
Georgetown	0	–	5	2	–	8
$ – Conference champion; ^ – FCS playoff participant; Rankings from The Sports Network poll

The 2008 Georgetown Hoyas football team was an American football team that represented Georgetown University during the 2008 NCAA Division I FCS football season. Georgetown finished last in the Patriot League.

In their third year under head coach Kevin Kelly, the Hoyas compiled a 2–8 record. Daniel Matheny and Nicholas Umar were the team captains.

The Hoyas were outscored 280 to 96. Their winless (0–5) conference record was the worst in the seven-team Patriot League standings. The Hoyas played only five Patriot League games because their October 4 matchup with Colgate was canceled following a norovirus outbreak at Georgetown.

Georgetown played its home games at Multi-Sport Field on the university campus in Washington, D.C.

== Schedule ==
Date	Opponent	Site	Result	Attendance	Source
September 7	at Howard*	William H. Greene Stadium; Washington, DC	W 12–7	6,085	
September 13	at Lafayette	Fisher Stadium; Easton, PA	L 6–24	10,134	
September 20	at Yale*	Yale Bowl; New Haven, CT	L 7–47	12,771	
September 27	Holy Cross	Multi-Sport Field; Washington, DC	L 14–38	2,233	
October 4	at Colgate	Andy Kerr Stadium; Hamilton, NY	Canceled		
October 11	Penn*	Multi-Sport Field; Washington, DC	L 7–27	3,135	
October 18	Bucknell	Multi-Sport Field; Washington, DC	L 24–27		
October 25	at No. 9 Richmond*	University of Richmond Stadium; Richmond, VA	L 0–48	5,168	
November 1	Lehigh	Multi-Sport Field; Washington, DC	L 13–33		
November 8	Marist*	Multi-Sport Field; Washington, DC	W 13–12	1,164	
November 15	at Fordham	Coffey Field; Bronx, NY	L 0–17	2,758	
*Non-conference game; Rankings from The Sports Network Poll released prior to the game
