= 2008 Columbia Lions football team =

American college football season

2008 Columbia Lions football
- Conference: Ivy League
- Record: 2–8 (2–5 Ivy)
- Head coach: Norries Wilson (3rd season)
- Offensive coordinator: Vinny Marino (3rd season)
- Defensive coordinator: Aaron Kelton (1st season)
- Captains: Mike Brune; Jordan Davis; Drew Quinn
- Home stadium: Robert K. Kraft Field at Lawrence A. Wien Stadium

2008 Ivy League football standings
	Conf.			Overall
Team	W		L	W		L
No. 15 Harvard +	6	–	1	9	–	1
Brown +	6	–	1	7	–	3
Penn	5	–	2	6	–	4
Yale	4	–	3	6	–	4
Princeton	3	–	4	4	–	6
Cornell	2	–	5	4	–	6
Columbia	2	–	5	2	–	8
Dartmouth	0	–	7	0	–	10
+ – Conference co-champions; Rankings from The Sports Network poll

The 2008 Columbia Lions football team was an American football team that represented Columbia University during the 2008 NCAA Division I FCS football season. Columbia tied for second-to-last in the Ivy League. Columbia averaged 3,827 fans per game.

In their third season under head coach Norries Wilson, the Lions compiled a 2–8 record and were outscored 245 to 171. Mike Brune, Jordan Davis and Drew Quinn were the team captains.

The Lions' 2–5 conference record placed them in a tie with Cornell for sixth in the Ivy League standings. Columbia was outscored 172 to 122 by Ivy opponents.

Columbia played its homes games at Robert K. Kraft Field at Lawrence A. Wien Stadium in Upper Manhattan, in New York City.

== Schedule ==
Date	Opponent	Site	Result	Attendance	Source
September 20	Fordham*	Robert K. Kraft Field at Lawrence A. Wien Stadium; New York, NY (Liberty Cup)	L 22–29	2,304	
September 27	at Towson*	Johnny Unitas Stadium; Towson, MD	L 24–31	5,030	
October 4	Princeton^{†}	Robert K. Kraft Field at Lawrence A. Wien Stadium; New York, NY	L 24–27	8,733	
October 11	Lafayette*	Robert K. Kraft Field at Lawrence A. Wien Stadium; New York, NY	L 3–13	2,127	
October 18	at Penn	Franklin Field; Philadelphia, PA	L 10–15	6,821	
October 25	Dartmouth	Robert K. Kraft Field at Lawrence A. Wien Stadium; New York, NY	W 21–13	2,161	
November 1	at Yale	Yale Bowl; New Haven, CT	L 12–27	11,870	
November 8	at No. 21 Harvard	Harvard Stadium; Boston, MA	L 28–42	12,437	
November 15	Cornell	Robert K. Kraft Field at Lawrence A. Wien Stadium; New York, NY (rivalry)	W 17–7	3,811	
November 22	at Brown	Brown Stadium; Providence, RI	L 10–41	7,865	
*Non-conference game; ^{†}Homecoming; Rankings from The Sports Network Poll released prior to the game
