= 2008 William & Mary Tribe football team =

American college football season

2008 William & Mary Tribe football
- Conference: Colonial Athletic Association
- South Division

Ranking
- Sports Network: No. 20
- Record: 7–4 (5–3 CAA)
- Head coach: Jimmye Laycock (29th season)
- Offensive coordinator: Zbig Kepa (16th season)
- Defensive coordinator: Bob Shoop (2nd season)
- Captains: Derek Cox; Elliott Mack; Jake Phillips; Josh Rutter
- Home stadium: Zable Stadium

2008 Colonial Athletic Association football standings
	Conf.			Overall
Team	W		L	W		L
North Division
No. 8 New Hampshire x^	6	–	2	10	–	3
No. 18 Maine ^	5	–	3	8	–	5
UMass	4	–	4	7	–	5
Hofstra	2	–	6	4	–	8
Rhode Island	1	–	7	3	–	9
Northeastern	1	–	7	2	–	10
South Division
No. 3 James Madison x$^	8	–	0	12	–	2
No. 6 Villanova ^	7	–	1	10	–	3
No. 1 Richmond ^	6	–	2	13	–	3
No. 20 William & Mary	5	–	3	7	–	4
Delaware	2	–	6	4	–	8
Towson	1	–	7	3	–	9
$ – Conference champion; x – Division champion/co-champions; ^ – FCS playoff participant; Rankings from The Sports Network poll

The 2008 William & Mary Tribe football team represented the College of William & Mary as member of South Division of the Colonial Athletic Association (CAA) during the 2008 NCAA Division I FCS football season. Led by Jimmye Laycock in his 29th year as head coach, William & Mary finished the season with an overall record of 7–4 and a mark of 5–3 in A-10 play, placing fourth in the South Division. They were ranked No. 20 in the final Sports Network poll, but did not receive a bid to the NCAA Division I playoffs.

The 2008 season was the final one for redshirt senior cornerback and punt returner Derek Cox. Cox, an All-Conference player, was in the 2009 NFL draft by the Jacksonville Jaguars with the ninth pick in the third round (73rd overall), making him the second-highest player ever drafted out of William & Mary. Darren Sharper was selected 60th overall in the second round of the 1997 NFL draft.

== Schedule ==
Date	Time	Opponent	Rank	Site	TV	Result	Attendance	Source
September 6	6:00 pm	at NC State*		Carter–Finley Stadium; Raleigh, NC	ACCS	L 24–34	56,694	
September 13	7:05 pm	VMI*		Zable Stadium; Williamsburg, VA (rivalry)		W 52–17	10,624	
September 20	7:00 pm	Norfolk State*		Zable Stadium; Williamsburg, VA		W 42–12	10,152	
October 4	1:00 pm	No. 14 Villanova		Zable Stadium; Williamsburg, VA		L 28–38	10,632	
October 11	12:00 pm	at No. 4 New Hampshire		Cowell Stadium; Durham, NH		W 38–34	13,255	
October 18	12:00 pm	at Delaware		Delaware Stadium; Newark, DE (rivalry)		W 27–3	21,949	
October 25	1:00 pm	Rhode Island^{†}	No. 23	Zable Stadium; Williamsburg, VA		W 34–24	9,383	
November 1	1:00 pm	at Towson	No. 16	Johnny Unitas Stadium; Towson, MD	CSN	W 34–14	3,168	
November 8	7:00 pm	Northeastern	No. 14	Zable Stadium; Williamsburg, VA		W 38–17	8,231	
November 15	1:30 pm	at No. 1 James Madison	No. 12	Bridgeforth Stadium; Harrisonburg, VA (rivalry)		L 24–48	14,330	
November 22	12:00 pm	No. 6 Richmond	No. 16	Zable Stadium; Williamsburg, VA (I-64 Bowl)	CSN	L 20–23 ^{OT}	9,405	
*Non-conference game; ^{†}Homecoming; Rankings from The Sports Network Poll released prior to the game; All times are in Eastern time
