= 2008 Colgate Raiders football team =

American college football season

2008 Colgate Raiders football

Patriot League champion

NCAA Division I First Round, L 28–55 vs. Villanova
- Conference: Patriot League

Ranking
- Sports Network: No. 16
- FCS Coaches: No. 17
- Record: 9–3 (5–0 Patriot)
- Head coach: Dick Biddle (13th season)
- Defensive coordinator: Steve Szabo (1st season)
- Captains: Jordan Scott; Nick Hennessey; Alex Relph
- Home stadium: Andy Kerr Stadium

2008 Patriot League football standings
	Conf.			Overall
Team	W		L	W		L
No. 16 Colgate $^	5	–	0	9	–	3
Holy Cross	5	–	1	7	–	4
Lehigh	4	–	2	5	–	6
Lafayette	3	–	3	7	–	4
Bucknell	2	–	4	5	–	6
Fordham	1	–	5	5	–	6
Georgetown	0	–	5	2	–	8
$ – Conference champion; ^ – FCS playoff participant; Rankings from The Sports Network poll

The 2008 Colgate Raiders football team was an American football team that represented Colgate University during the 2008 NCAA Division I FCS football season. Colgate won the Patriot League championship, but lost in the first round of the national FCS playoffs.

In its 13th season under head coach Dick Biddle, the team compiled a 9–3 record (9–2 regular season). Jordan Scott, Nick Hennessey and Alex Relph were the team captains.

The Raiders outscored opponents 363 to 349. Their undefeated (5–0) conference record topped the seven-team Patriot League standings. Colgate played only five Patriot League games because its October 4 matchup with Georgetown was canceled following a norovirus outbreak at Georgetown.

Colgate began the year unranked and did not enter the national top 25 until November. They were ranked No. 24 before their matchup with Lehigh, No. 21 before the season-ender against Holy Cross, and No. 16 entering the playoffs. Following their first-round exit from the playoffs, the Raiders kept their No. 16 rank in the year's final poll.

The team played its home games at Andy Kerr Stadium in Hamilton, New York.

== Schedule ==
Date	Opponent	Rank	Site	Result	Attendance	Source
August 30	at Stony Brook*		Kenneth P. LaValle Stadium; Stony Brook, NY	L 26–42	5,808	
September 6	at Coastal Carolina*		Brooks Stadium; Conway, SC	W 23–19	6,433	
September 13	Furman*		Andy Kerr Stadium; Hamilton, NY	L 21–42	5,857	
September 20	Dartmouth*		Andy Kerr Stadium; Hamilton, NY	W 34–20	5,235	
September 27	at Fordham		Coffey Field; Bronx, NY	W 31–24	3,112	
October 4	Georgetown		Andy Kerr Stadium; Hamilton, NY	Canceled		
October 11	Princeton*		Andy Kerr Stadium; Hamilton, NY	W 27–24	4,688	
October 18	at Cornell*		Schoellkopf Field; Ithaca, NY (rivalry)	W 38–22	8,542	
October 25	at Bucknell		Christy Mathewson–Memorial Stadium; Lewisburg, PA	W 52–28		
November 1	No. 21 Lafayette		Andy Kerr Stadium; Hamilton, NY	W 21–13	6,721	
November 8	at Lehigh	No. 24	Goodman Stadium; Bethlehem, PA	W 34–33	10,841	
November 22	Holy Cross	No. 21	Andy Kerr Stadium; Hamilton, NY	W 28–27	4,862	
November 29	at No. 6 Villanova*	No. 17	Villanova Stadium; Villanova, PA (FCS playoffs)	L 28–55	4,489	
*Non-conference game; Rankings from The Sports Network Poll released prior to the game
