= 2008 Maine Black Bears football team =

American college football season

2008 Maine Black Bears football

NCAA Division I First Round, L 15–40 at Northern Iowa
- Conference: Colonial Athletic Association
- North Division
- Record: 8–5 (5–3 CAA)
- Head coach: Jack Cosgrove (16th season)
- Captains: Jovan Belcher; Jhamal Fluellen
- Home stadium: Alfond Stadium

2008 Colonial Athletic Association football standings
	Conf.			Overall
Team	W		L	W		L
North Division
No. 8 New Hampshire x^	6	–	2	10	–	3
No. 18 Maine ^	5	–	3	8	–	5
UMass	4	–	4	7	–	5
Hofstra	2	–	6	4	–	8
Rhode Island	1	–	7	3	–	9
Northeastern	1	–	7	2	–	10
South Division
No. 3 James Madison x$^	8	–	0	12	–	2
No. 6 Villanova ^	7	–	1	10	–	3
No. 1 Richmond ^	6	–	2	13	–	3
No. 20 William & Mary	5	–	3	7	–	4
Delaware	2	–	6	4	–	8
Towson	1	–	7	3	–	9
$ – Conference champion; x – Division champion/co-champions; ^ – FCS playoff participant; Rankings from The Sports Network poll

The 2008 Maine Black Bears football team was an American football team that represented the University of Maine as a member of the Colonial Athletic Association (CAA) during the 2008 NCAA Division I FCS football season. In their 16th season under head coach Jack Cosgrove, the Black Bears compiled an 8–5 record (5–3 against conference opponents), finished second in the CAA's North Division, and lost to Northern Iowa in the first round of the NCAA FCS playoffs. Jovan Belcher and Jhamal Fluellen were the team captains.

== Schedule ==
Date	Time	Opponent	Rank	Site	TV	Result	Attendance	Source
August 30	12:00 p.m.	at Iowa*		Kinnick Stadium; Iowa City, IA	BTN	L 3–46	70,585	
September 6	1:00 p.m.	at Monmouth*		Kessler Field; West Long Branch, NJ		W 21–17	1,945	
September 13	6:00 p.m.	Stony Brook		Alfond Stadium; Orono, ME (The Battle for the Butter)	WABI-TV/Big South Net	W 28–13	6,425	
September 20	3:00 p.m.	at No. 2 Richmond		University of Richmond Stadium; Richmond, VA		L 17–44	8,012	
September 27	6:00 p.m.	No. 2 James Madison		Alfond Stadium; Orono, ME		L 10–24	3,188	
October 11	6:00 p.m.	at No. 20 Delaware		Delaware Stadium; Newark, DE	CN8	W 27–10	21,302	
October 18	3:00 p.m.	Hofstra		Alfond Stadium; Orono, ME		W 41–40 ^{2OT}	3,690	
October 25		Northeastern		Alfond Stadium; Orono, ME		W 20–0		
November 1		Iona		Alfond Stadium; Orono, ME		W 55–7		
November 8	12:00 p.m.	at No. 13 UMass		McGuirk Stadium; Hadley, MA	CSN NE/CSN MA	W 21–20	9,182	
November 15		at Rhode Island	No. 21	Meade Stadium; Kingston, RI		W 37–7		
November 22	12:00 p.m.	No. 11 New Hampshire	No. 17	Alfond Stadium; Orono, ME (Battle for the Brice–Cowell Musket)		L 24–28	5,719	
November 29	5:05 p.m.	at No. 4 Northern Iowa*	No. 21	UNI-Dome; Cedar Falls, IA (NCAA Division I First Round)		L 15–40	8,477	
*Non-conference game; Rankings from The Sports Network Poll released prior to the game; All times are in Eastern time
