= 2008 Brown Bears football team =

American college football season

2008 Brown Bears football

Ivy League co-champion
- Conference: Ivy League
- Record: 7–3 (6–1 Ivy)
- Head coach: Phil Estes (11th season)
- Offensive coordinator: Frank Sheehan (3rd season)
- Offensive scheme: Pro-style
- Defensive coordinator: Michael Kelleher (8th season)
- Base defense: 4–3
- Captains: Michael Dougherty; Darrell Harrison
- Home stadium: Brown Stadium

2008 Ivy League football standings
| | Conf. | | | Overall |
| Team | W | | L | W | | L |
|---|---|---|---|---|---|---|
| No. 15 Harvard + | 6 | – | 1 | 9 | – | 1 |
| Brown + | 6 | – | 1 | 7 | – | 3 |
| Penn | 5 | – | 2 | 6 | – | 4 |
| Yale | 4 | – | 3 | 6 | – | 4 |
| Princeton | 3 | – | 4 | 4 | – | 6 |
| Cornell | 2 | – | 5 | 4 | – | 6 |
| Columbia | 2 | – | 5 | 2 | – | 8 |
| Dartmouth | 0 | – | 7 | 0 | – | 10 |
+ – Conference co-champions; Rankings from The Sports Network poll

The 2008 Brown Bears football team was an American football team that represented Brown University during the 2008 NCAA Division I FCS football season. Brown tied for first in the Ivy League. Brown averaged 7,088 fans per game.

In their 12th season under head coach Phil Estes, the Bears compiled a 7–3 record and outscored opponents 269 to 190. Michael Dougherty and Darrell Harrison were the team captains.

The Bears' 5–1 conference record earned the Ivy League co-championship. Brown outscored Ivy opponents 205 to 105.

After beating their eventual co-champion, Harvard, the Bears were briefly ranked No. 25 for the first week of October. They lost their next two games, and did not return to the national top 25 for the rest of the year.

Brown played its home games at Brown Stadium in Providence, Rhode Island.

== Schedule ==
| Date | Opponent | Site | Result | Attendance | Source |
|---|---|---|---|---|---|
| September 20 | Stony Brook* | Brown Stadium; Providence, RI | W 12–7 | 3,652 | |
| September 27 | Harvard | Brown Stadium; Providence, RI | W 24–22 | 5,618 | |
| October 4 | at Rhode Island* | Meade Stadium; Kingston, RI (rivalry) | L 13–37 | 6,014 | |
| October 11 | at Holy Cross* | Fitton Field; Worcester, MA | L 34–41 | 7,493 | |
| October 18 | at Princeton | Powers Field at Princeton Stadium; Princeton, NJ | W 31–10 | 11,814 | |
| October 25 | Cornell | Brown Stadium; Providence, RI | W 27–7 | 9,298 | |
| November 1 | at Penn | Franklin Field; Philadelphia, PA | W 34–27 | 15,056 | |
| November 8 | Yale | Brown Stadium; Providence, RI | L 3–13 | 9,010 | |
| November 15 | at Dartmouth | Memorial Field; Hanover, NH | W 45–16 | 2,215 | |
| November 22 | Columbia | Brown Stadium; Providence, RI | W 41–10 | 7,865 | |
*Non-conference game
