= 2008 Eastern Illinois Panthers football team =

American college football season

2008 Eastern Illinois Panthers football
- Conference: Ohio Valley Conference
- Record: 5–7 (3–5 OVC)
- Head coach: Bob Spoo (21st season)
- Home stadium: O'Brien Field

2008 Ohio Valley Conference football standings
| | Conf. | | | Overall |
| Team | W | | L | W | | L |
|---|---|---|---|---|---|---|
| No. 19 Eastern Kentucky $^ | 7 | – | 1 | 8 | – | 4 |
| Jacksonville State | 6 | – | 2 | 8 | – | 3 |
| Tennessee–Martin | 6 | – | 2 | 8 | – | 4 |
| Tennessee State | 5 | – | 3 | 8 | – | 4 |
| Murray State | 4 | – | 4 | 5 | – | 7 |
| Eastern Illinois | 3 | – | 5 | 5 | – | 7 |
| Southeast Missouri State | 2 | – | 6 | 4 | – | 8 |
| Austin Peay | 2 | – | 6 | 2 | – | 9 |
| Tennessee Tech | 1 | – | 7 | 3 | – | 9 |
$ – Conference champion; ^ – FCS playoff participant; Rankings from The Sports Network poll

The 2008 Eastern Illinois Panthers football team represented Eastern Illinois University as a member of the Ohio Valley Conference (OVC) during the 2008 NCAA Division I FCS football season. The team was led by 21st-year head coach Bob Spoo and played their home games at O'Brien Field in Charleston, Illinois. The Panthers finished the season with an 5–7 record overall and a 3–5 record in conference play, placing sixth in the OVC.

== Schedule ==
| Date | Opponent | Rank | Site | Result | Attendance | Source |
|---|---|---|---|---|---|---|
| August 28 | at Central Michigan* | No. 18 | Kelly/Shorts Stadium; Mount Pleasant, MI | L 12–31 | 19,732 | |
| September 6 | at No. 24 (FBS) Illinois* | No. 19 | Memorial Stadium; Champaign, IL | L 21–47 | 60,131 | |
| September 13 | Indiana State* | No. 20 | O'Brien Field; Charleston, IL | W 38–3 | 5,507 | |
| September 20 | at Illinois State* | No. 22 | Hancock Stadium; Normal, IL (rivalry) | W 25–21 | 14,023 | |
| September 27 | Jacksonville State | No. 21 | O'Brien Field; Charleston, IL | L 10–23 | 7,996 | |
| October 9 | at Tennessee–Martin | | Graham Stadium; Martin, TN | L 26–29 | 1,293 | |
| October 18 | Southeast Missouri State | | O'Brien Field; Charleston, IL | W 24–21 | 5,942 | |
| October 25 | at Eastern Kentucky | | Roy Kidd Stadium; Richmond, KY | L 7–20 | 8,800 | |
| November 1 | Murray State | | O'Brien Field; Charleston, IL | W 34–6 | 4,083 | |
| November 8 | at No. 22 Tennessee State | | LP Field; Nashville, TN | L 24–45 | 6,393 | |
| November 15 | Austin Peay | | O'Brien Field; Charleston, IL | L 13–15 | 1,919 | |
| November 22 | at Tennessee Tech | | Tucker Stadium; Cookeville, TN | W 38–20 | 1,430 | |
*Non-conference game; Rankings from The Sports Network Poll released prior to the game
