= 2008 Delaware Fightin' Blue Hens football team =

American college football season

2008 Delaware Fightin' Blue Hens football
- Conference: Colonial Athletic Association
- South Division
- Record: 4–8 (2–6 CAA)
- Head coach: K. C. Keeler (7th season)
- Offensive coordinator: Brian Ginn (1st season)
- Offensive scheme: Spread
- Defensive coordinator: Nick Rapone (3rd season)
- Base defense: 4–3
- Home stadium: Delaware Stadium

2008 Colonial Athletic Association football standings
	Conf.			Overall
Team	W		L	W		L
North Division
No. 8 New Hampshire x^	6	–	2	10	–	3
No. 18 Maine ^	5	–	3	8	–	5
UMass	4	–	4	7	–	5
Hofstra	2	–	6	4	–	8
Rhode Island	1	–	7	3	–	9
Northeastern	1	–	7	2	–	10
South Division
No. 3 James Madison x$^	8	–	0	12	–	2
No. 6 Villanova ^	7	–	1	10	–	3
No. 1 Richmond ^	6	–	2	13	–	3
No. 20 William & Mary	5	–	3	7	–	4
Delaware	2	–	6	4	–	8
Towson	1	–	7	3	–	9
$ – Conference champion; x – Division champion/co-champions; ^ – FCS playoff participant; Rankings from The Sports Network poll

The 2008 Delaware Fightin' Blue Hens football team represented the University of Delaware as a member of the South Division of the Colonial Athletic Association (CAA) during the 2008 NCAA Division I FCS football season. Led by seventh-year head coach K. C. Keeler, the Fightin' Blue Hens compiled an overall record of 4–8 with a mark of 2–6 in conference play, placing fifth in place in the CAA's South Division. The team played home games at Delaware Stadium in Newark, Delaware. The 2008 season proved to be one of Delaware's worst seasons in its 117-year history. It was the first, still only season, in which the Blue Hens lost eight games.

== Schedule ==
Date	Time	Opponent	Rank	Site	TV	Result	Attendance	Source
August 30	3:30 pm	at Maryland*	No. 8	Byrd Stadium; College Park, MD	ESPN	L 7–14	49,119	
September 13	6:00 pm	No. 23 (D-II) West Chester*	No. 6	Delaware Stadium; Newark, DE (rivalry)		W 48–20	22,029	
September 20	2:00 pm	at No. 23 Furman*	No. 6	Paladin Stadium; Greenville, SC		L 21–23	12,781	
September 27	6:00 pm	Albany*	No. 17	Delaware Stadium; Newark, DE		W 38–7	22,196	
October 4	3:30 pm	at No. 12 UMass	No. 14	Warren McGuirk Alumni Stadium; Hadley, MA	CN8	L 7–17	16,422	
October 11	6:00 pm	Maine	No. 20	Delaware Stadium; Newark, DE	CN8	L 10–27	21,302	
October 18	12:00 pm	William & Mary^{†}		Delaware Stadium; Newark, DE (rivalry)		L 3–27	21,949	
October 25	3:00 pm	at Hofstra		James M. Shuart Stadium; Hempstead, New York		W 17–0	3,518	
November 1	3:30 pm	at No. 1 James Madison		Bridgeforth Stadium; Harrisonburg, VA (rivalry)	CN8	L 7–41	16,810	
November 8	12:00 pm	Towson		Delaware Stadium; Newark, DE		W 31–21	20,720	
November 15	3:30 pm	at No. 6 Richmond		University of Richmond Stadium; Richmond, VA	CN8	L 14–31	6,173	
November 22	2:30 pm	No. 7 Villanova		Delaware Stadium; Newark, DE (Battle of the Blue)	CN8	L 7–21	21,457	
*Non-conference game; ^{†}Homecoming; Rankings from The Sports Network Poll released prior to the game; All times are in Eastern time

== Game summaries ==
=== Maryland ===
	1	2	3	4	Total
Delaware	0	0	0	7	7
Maryland	0	7	7	0	14

=== West Chester ===
	1	2	3	4	Total
West Chester	0	6	0	14	20
Delaware	14	20	0	14	48

=== Furman ===
	1	2	3	4	Total
Delaware	7	0	7	7	21
Furman	7	13	0	3	23

=== Albany ===
	1	2	3	4	Total
Albany	0	7	0	0	7
Delaware	7	7	10	14	38

=== UMass ===
	1	2	3	4	Total
Delaware	7	0	0	0	7
UMass	7	0	0	10	17

=== Maine ===
	1	2	3	4	Total
Maine	0	10	0	17	27
Delaware	3	7	0	0	10

=== William & Mary ===
	1	2	3	4	Total
William & Mary	3	10	0	14	27
Delaware	0	0	0	3	3

=== Hofstra ===
	1	2	3	4	Total
Delaware	7	3	0	7	17
Hofstra	0	0	0	0	0

=== James Madison ===
	1	2	3	4	Total
Delaware	0	0	7	0	7
James Madison	7	7	20	7	41

=== Towson ===
	1	2	3	4	Total
Towson	0	0	13	8	21
Delaware	0	14	10	7	31

=== Richmond ===
	1	2	3	4	Total
Delaware	7	0	0	7	14
Richmond	3	14	0	14	31

=== Villanova ===
	1	2	3	4	Total
Villanova	0	14	7	0	21
Delaware	0	0	0	7	7
