= 2008 Jacksonville State Gamecocks football team =

American college football season

2008 Jacksonville State Gamecocks football
- Conference: Ohio Valley Conference
- Record: 8–3 (6–2 OVC)
- Head coach: Jack Crowe (9th season)
- Offensive coordinator: Ronnie Letson (4th season)
- Defensive coordinator: Greg Stewart (9th season)
- Home stadium: Paul Snow Stadium

2008 Ohio Valley Conference football standings
	Conf.			Overall
Team	W		L	W		L
No. 19 Eastern Kentucky $^	7	–	1	8	–	4
Jacksonville State	6	–	2	8	–	3
Tennessee–Martin	6	–	2	8	–	4
Tennessee State	5	–	3	8	–	4
Murray State	4	–	4	5	–	7
Eastern Illinois	3	–	5	5	–	7
Southeast Missouri State	2	–	6	4	–	8
Austin Peay	2	–	6	2	–	9
Tennessee Tech	1	–	7	3	–	9
$ – Conference champion; ^ – FCS playoff participant; Rankings from The Sports Network poll

The 2008 Jacksonville State Gamecocks football team represented Jacksonville State University as a member of the Ohio Valley Conference (OVC) during the 2008 NCAA Division I FCS football season. Led by ninth-year head coach Jack Crowe, the Gamecocks compiled an overall record of 8–3 with a mark of 6–2 in conference play, tying for second place in the OVC. Jacksonville State played home games at Paul Snow Stadium in Jacksonville, Alabama.

== Schedule ==
Date	Time	Opponent	Rank	Site	TV	Result	Attendance	Source
August 28	7:30 p.m.	at Georgia Tech*		Bobby Dodd Stadium; Atlanta, GA	ESPN360	L 14–41	45,706	
September 6	6:00 p.m.	Alabama A&M*		Paul Snow Stadium; Jacksonville, AL	WJXS-TV 24	W 45–18	16,654	
September 20	6:00 p.m.	at Chattanooga*		Finley Stadium; Chattanooga, TN		W 33–3	8,240	
September 27	1:35 p.m.	at No. 21 Eastern Illinois		O'Brien Stadium; Charleston, IL		W 23–10	7,996	
October 4	6:00 p.m.	Southeast Missouri State	No. 22	Paul Snow Stadium; Jacksonville, AL	WJXS-TV 24	W 38–17	8,917	
October 11	6:00 p.m.	at Eastern Kentucky	No. 18	Roy Kidd Stadium; Richmond, KY		L 35–38	6,100	
October 18	4:00 p.m.	Murray State	No. 23	Paul Snow Stadium; Jacksonville, AL	WJXS-TV 24	W 31–21	14,251	
October 23	6:30 pm	at Tennessee–Martin		Graham Stadium; Martin, TN	ESPNU	L 30–31	1,790	
November 1	2:00 pm	Austin Peay State		Paul Snow Stadium; Jacksonville, AL	WJXS-TV 24	W 35–22	8,628	
November 8	1:30 p.m.	at Tennessee Tech		Tucker Stadium; Cookeville, TN		W 41–17	9,413	
November 15	2:00 p.m.	No. 18 Tennessee State		Paul Snow Stadium; Jacksonville, AL	WJXS-TV 24	W 26–21	7,956	
*Non-conference game; Rankings from The Sports Network Poll released prior to the game; All times are in Central time
