= 2008 Eastern Kentucky Colonels football team =

American college football season

2008 Eastern Kentucky Colonels football

OVC champion

NCAA Division I First Round, L 10–38 vs. Richmond
- Conference: Ohio Valley Conference

Ranking
- Sports Network: No. 19
- FCS Coaches: No. 18
- Record: 8–4 (7–1 OVC)
- Head coach: Dean Hood (1st season)
- Offensive coordinator: Mike Springston (1st season)
- Home stadium: Roy Kidd Stadium

2008 Ohio Valley Conference football standings
	Conf.			Overall
Team	W		L	W		L
No. 19 Eastern Kentucky $^	7	–	1	8	–	4
Jacksonville State	6	–	2	8	–	3
Tennessee–Martin	6	–	2	8	–	4
Tennessee State	5	–	3	8	–	4
Murray State	4	–	4	5	–	7
Eastern Illinois	3	–	5	5	–	7
Southeast Missouri State	2	–	6	4	–	8
Austin Peay	2	–	6	2	–	9
Tennessee Tech	1	–	7	3	–	9
$ – Conference champion; ^ – FCS playoff participant; Rankings from The Sports Network poll

The 2008 Eastern Kentucky Colonels football team represented Eastern Kentucky University in the 2008 NCAA Division I FCS football season. The team was led by Dean Hood, the 2008 Ohio Valley Conference (OVC) Roy Kidd Coach of the Year. Hood was in his first season as head coach. The Colonels played their home games at Roy Kidd Stadium in Richmond, Kentucky. The team finished the season with a record of 8–4 overall and 7–1 in OVC play, winning the OVC title. They received an at–large bid in the FCS playoffs, where they lost in the first round to Richmond.

== Schedule ==
Date	Time	Opponent	Rank	Site	Result	Attendance	Source
August 28	7:30 pm	at Cincinnati*		Nippert Stadium; Cincinnati, OH	L 7–40	26,913	
September 6	6:00 pm	Western Kentucky*	No. 24	Roy Kidd Stadium; Richmond, KY (Battle of the Bluegrass)	L 13–37	18,500	
September 13	6:00 pm	Morehead State*		Roy Kidd Stadium; Richmond, KY (Old Hawg Rifle)	W 16–8		
September 20	6:00 pm	at No. 25 Tennessee State		LP Field; Nashville, TN	L 20–34	8,276	
September 27	3:00 pm	Austin Peay		Roy Kidd Stadium; Richmond, KY	W 13–10 ^{OT}		
October 4	8:00 pm	at Tennessee Tech		Tucker Stadium; Cookeville, TN	W 33–12		
October 11	6:00 pm	No. 18 Jacksonville State		Roy Kidd Stadium; Richmond, KY	W 38–35	6,100	
October 25	3:00 pm	Eastern Illinois^{†}		Roy Kidd Stadium; Richmond, KY	W 20–7	8,800	
November 1	2:00 pm	at Southeast Missouri State		Houck Stadium; Cape Girardeau, MO	W 29–16		
November 15	1:00 pm	Murray State		Roy Kidd Stadium; Richmond, KY	W 34–7		
November 22	1:00 pm	at No. 18 Tennessee–Martin		Graham Stadium; Martin, TN	W 33–31		
November 29	1:00 pm	at No. 7 Richmond*	No. 21	University of Richmond Stadium; Richmond, VA (NCAA Division I First Round)	L 10–38	2,994	
*Non-conference game; ^{†}Homecoming; Rankings from The Sports Network Poll released prior to the game; All times are in Eastern time

== Coaching staff ==
Name	Position	Alma Mater	Year
Dean Hood	Head coach	Ohio Wesleyan, 1986	1st
Mike Springston	Offensive coordinator/QBs coach	West Virginia Tech, 1981	1st
Carson Jeffers	Special teams coordinator/tight ends coach	Concord College, 1997	1st
Donn Landholm	Linebackers coach/recruiting coordinator	Wayne State, 1979	12th
Tony Hatmaker	Defensive backs coach	Union College (KY), 1993	1st
Ben Hodges	Wide receivers coach	Central College, 2006	3rd
Shawn Clark	Offensive line coach	Appalachian State, 1998	6th
Jake Johnson	Defensive line coach	Eastern Kentucky, 2002	5th
John Revere	Running backs coach	Eastern Kentucky, 1976	12th
