= 2008 James Madison Dukes football team =

American college football season

2008 James Madison Dukes football

CAA champion CAA South Division champion Lambert Cup winner

NCAA Division I Semifinal, L 27–35 vs. Montana
- Conference: Colonial Athletic Association
- South Division

Ranking
- Sports Network: No. 3
- Record: 12–2 (8–0 CAA)
- Head coach: Mickey Matthews (10th season)
- Offensive coordinator: Jeff Durden (5th season)
- Defensive coordinator: George Barlow (5th season)
- Home stadium: Bridgeforth Stadium

2008 Colonial Athletic Association football standings
	Conf.			Overall
Team	W		L	W		L
North Division
No. 8 New Hampshire x^	6	–	2	10	–	3
No. 18 Maine ^	5	–	3	8	–	5
UMass	4	–	4	7	–	5
Hofstra	2	–	6	4	–	8
Rhode Island	1	–	7	3	–	9
Northeastern	1	–	7	2	–	10
South Division
No. 3 James Madison x$^	8	–	0	12	–	2
No. 6 Villanova ^	7	–	1	10	–	3
No. 1 Richmond ^	6	–	2	13	–	3
No. 20 William & Mary	5	–	3	7	–	4
Delaware	2	–	6	4	–	8
Towson	1	–	7	3	–	9
$ – Conference champion; x – Division champion/co-champions; ^ – FCS playoff participant; Rankings from The Sports Network poll

The 2008 James Madison Dukes football team represented James Madison University in the 2008 NCAA Division I FCS football season. JMU finished the season 12–2 with an undefeated record of 8–0 in the Colonial Athletic Association.

== Schedule ==
Date	Time	Opponent	Rank	Site	TV	Result	Attendance	Source
August 30	7:00 pm	at Duke*	No. 3	Wallace Wade Stadium; Durham, NC	ACCS	L 7–31	32,571	
September 6	6:00 pm	North Carolina Central*	No. 8	Bridgeforth Stadium; Harrisonburg, VA		W 56–7	15,518	
September 13	3:30 pm	No. 3 Massachusetts	No. 7	Bridgeforth Stadium; Harrisonburg, VA	Comcast	W 52–38	15,747	
September 20	7:00 pm	No. 1 Appalachian State*	No. 5	Bridgeforth Stadium; Harrisonburg, VA	Comcast	W 35–32	17,163	
September 27	6:00 pm	at Maine	No. 2	Alfond Stadium; Orono, ME		W 24–10	3,188	
October 4	1:30 pm	Hofstra	No. 1	Bridgeforth Stadium; Harrisonburg, VA		W 56–0	16,109	
October 11	12:00 pm	at No. 5 Richmond	No. 1	Richmond Stadium; Richmond, VA	CSN	W 38–31	16,151	
October 25	3:30 pm	at No. 7 Villanova	No. 1	Villanova Stadium; Villanova, PA	Comcast	W 23–19	6,721	
November 1	3:30 pm	Delaware^{†}	No. 1	Bridgeforth Stadium; Harrisonburg, VA (rivalry)	Comcast	W 41–7	16,810	
November 15	1:30 pm	No. 12 William & Mary	No. 1	Bridgeforth Stadium; Harrisonburg, VA (rivalry)		W 48–24	14,330	
November 22	1:00 pm	at Towson	No. 1	Johnny Unitas Stadium; Towson, MD		W 58–27	5,575	
November 29	3:00 pm	Wofford*	No. 1	Bridgeforth Stadium; Harrisonburg, VA (NCAA Division I First Round)		W 38–35	12,826	
December 6	3:30 pm	No. 6 Villanova*	No. 1	Bridgeforth Stadium; Harrisonburg, VA (NCAA Division I Quarterfinal)	ESPNGP	W 31–27	13,780	
December 12	3:30 pm	No. 5 Montana*	No. 1	Bridgeforth Stadium; Harrisonburg, VA (NCAA Division I Semifinal)	ESPN2	L 27–35	15,976	
*Non-conference game; ^{†}Homecoming; Rankings from The Sports Network Poll released prior to the game; All times are in Eastern time
