= 2008 Harvard Crimson football team =

American college football season

2008 Harvard Crimson football

Ivy League co-champion
- Conference: Ivy League

Ranking
- Sports Network: No. 15
- Record: 9–1 (6–1 Ivy)
- Head coach: Tim Murphy (15th season)
- Offensive coordinator: Joel Lamb (3rd season)
- Offensive scheme: Spread
- Defensive coordinator: Kevin Doherty (7th season)
- Base defense: 3–4
- Home stadium: Harvard Stadium

2008 Ivy League football standings
	Conf.			Overall
Team	W		L	W		L
No. 15 Harvard +	6	–	1	9	–	1
Brown +	6	–	1	7	–	3
Penn	5	–	2	6	–	4
Yale	4	–	3	6	–	4
Princeton	3	–	4	4	–	6
Cornell	2	–	5	4	–	6
Columbia	2	–	5	2	–	8
Dartmouth	0	–	7	0	–	10
+ – Conference co-champions; Rankings from The Sports Network poll

The 2008 Harvard Crimson football team was an American football team that represented Harvard University in the 2008 NCAA Division I FCS football season. They had an Ivy League record of 6–1 and an overall record of 9–1. They tied with Brown for the Ivy League title. Harvard averaged 17,360 fans per game.

== Schedule ==
Date	Opponent	Rank	Site	Result	Attendance	Source
September 19	Holy Cross*		Harvard Stadium; Boston, MA	W 25–24	20,462	
September 27	at Brown		Brown Stadium; Providence, RI	L 24–22	5,618	
October 4	at Lafayette*		Fisher Stadium; Easton, PA	W 27–13	7,789	
October 11	Cornell		Harvard Stadium; Boston, MA	W 38–17	11,263	
October 18	Lehigh*		Harvard Stadium; Boston, MA	W 27–24	11,242	
October 25	at Princeton	No. 25	Powers Field at Princeton Stadium; Princeton, NJ (rivalry)	W 24–20	10,189	
November 1	at Dartmouth	No. 23	Memorial Field; Hanover, NH (rivalry)	W 35–7	4,111	
November 8	Columbia	No. 21	Harvard Stadium; Boston, MA	W 42–28	12,437	
November 15	at Penn	No. 19	Franklin Field; Philadelphia, PA (rivalry)	W 24–21	7,352	
November 22	Yale	No. 19	Harvard Stadium; Boston, MA (The Game)	W 10–0	31,398	
*Non-conference game; Rankings from The Sports Network Poll released prior to the game
