= 2008 Lafayette Leopards football team =

American college football season

2008 Lafayette Leopards football
- Conference: Patriot League
- Record: 7–4 (3–3 Patriot)
- Head coach: Frank Tavani (9th season)
- Offensive scheme: Multiple
- Defensive coordinator: John Loose (9th season)
- Base defense: 4–3
- Home stadium: Fisher Stadium

2008 Patriot League football standings
| | Conf. | | | Overall |
| Team | W | | L | W | | L |
|---|---|---|---|---|---|---|
| No. 16 Colgate $^ | 5 | – | 0 | 9 | – | 3 |
| Holy Cross | 5 | – | 1 | 7 | – | 4 |
| Lehigh | 4 | – | 2 | 5 | – | 6 |
| Lafayette | 3 | – | 3 | 7 | – | 4 |
| Bucknell | 2 | – | 4 | 5 | – | 6 |
| Fordham | 1 | – | 5 | 5 | – | 6 |
| Georgetown | 0 | – | 5 | 2 | – | 8 |
$ – Conference champion; ^ – FCS playoff participant; Rankings from The Sports Network poll

The 2008 Lafayette Leopards football team represented Lafayette College as member of the Patriot League during the 2008 NCAA Division I FCS football season. Led by ninth-year head coach Frank Tavani, the Leopards compiled an overall record of 7–4 with a mark of 3–3 in conference play, placing fourth in the Patriot League. Lafayette played home games at Fisher Field in Easton, Pennsylvania.

== Schedule ==
| Date | Time | Opponent | Rank | Site | TV | Result | Attendance | Source |
|---|---|---|---|---|---|---|---|---|
| September 6 | 6:00 pm | at Marist* | | Tenney Stadium; Poughkeepsie, NY | LSN | W 28–6 | 853 | |
| September 13 | 6:00 pm | Georgetown | | Fisher Stadium; Easton, PA | LSN | W 24–6 | 10,134 | |
| September 27 | 6:00 pm | Penn*^{†} | | Fisher Stadium; Easton, PA | LSN | W 24–17 | 7,561 | |
| October 4 | 1:00 pm | Harvard* | | Fisher Stadium; Easton, PA | LSN | L 13–27 | 7,789 | |
| October 11 | 12:30 pm | at Columbia* | | Robert K. Kraft Field at Lawrence A. Wien Stadium; New York, NY | LSN | W 13–3 | 2,127 | |
| October 18 | 12:30 pm | at No. 14 Liberty* | | Williams Stadium; Lynchburg, VA | LSN | W 35–21 | 15,483 | |
| October 25 | 1:00 pm | at Fordham | No. 24 | Coffey Field; Bronx, NY | LSN | W 48–13 | 3,706 | |
| November 1 | 12:30 pm | at Colgate | No. 21 | Andy Kerr Stadium; Hamilton, NY | LSN | L 13–21 | 6,721 | |
| November 8 | 12:30 pm | at Bucknell | | Christy Mathewson–Memorial Stadium; Lewisburg, PA | LSN | W 38–21 | 1,979 | |
| November 15 | 12:30 pm | Holy Cross | | Fisher Stadium; Easton, PA | LSN | L 26–27 | 7,439 | |
| November 22 | 1:00 pm | Lehigh | | Fisher Stadium; Easton, PA (The Rivalry) | LSN | L 15–31 | 15,908 | |
*Non-conference game; ^{†}Homecoming; Rankings from The Sports Network Poll released prior to the game; All times are in Eastern time
