= 2008 Tennessee State Tigers football team =

American college football season

2008 Tennessee State Tigers football
- Conference: Ohio Valley Conference
- Record: 8–4 (5–3 OVC)
- Head coach: James Webster (4th season)
- Offensive coordinator: Fred Kaiss (3rd season)
- Defensive coordinator: Rod Reed (3rd as DC; 6th overall season)
- Home stadium: LP Field

2008 Ohio Valley Conference football standings
	Conf.			Overall
Team	W		L	W		L
No. 19 Eastern Kentucky $^	7	–	1	8	–	4
Jacksonville State	6	–	2	8	–	3
Tennessee–Martin	6	–	2	8	–	4
Tennessee State	5	–	3	8	–	4
Murray State	4	–	4	5	–	7
Eastern Illinois	3	–	5	5	–	7
Southeast Missouri State	2	–	6	4	–	8
Austin Peay	2	–	6	2	–	9
Tennessee Tech	1	–	7	3	–	9
$ – Conference champion; ^ – FCS playoff participant; Rankings from The Sports Network poll

The 2008 Tennessee State Tigers football team represented Tennessee State University as a member of the Ohio Valley Conference (OVC) during the 2008 NCAA Division I FCS football season. Led by fourth-year head coach James Webster, the Tigers compiled an overall record of 8–4, with a conference record of 5–3, and finished fourth in the OVC.

== Schedule ==
Date	Opponent	Rank	Site	Result	Attendance	Source
August 30	at Alabama A&M*		Louis Crews Stadium; Normal, AL	W 34–13	10,072	
September 6	Southern*		LP Field; Nashville, TN (John Merritt Classic)	W 34–32	28,830	
September 13	vs. Jackson State*		Liberty Bowl Memorial Stadium; Memphis, TN (Southern Heritage Classic)	W 41–18	50,794	
September 20	Eastern Kentucky	No. 25	LP Field; Nashville, TN	W 34–20	8,276	
September 27	vs. Florida A&M*	No. 23	Georgia Dome; Atlanta, GA (Atlanta Football Classic)	L 21–28	50,428	
October 4	at Tennessee–Martin		Graham Stadium; Martin, TN	W 30–27 ^{OT}		
October 18	Austin Peay	No. 21	LP Field; Nashville, TN	W 37–34	9,358	
October 25	at Southeast Missouri State		Houck Stadium; Cape Girardeau, MO	L 20–27	9,750	
November 1	Tennessee Tech^{†}		LP Field; Nashville, TN	W 41–14	24,361	
November 8	Eastern Illinois	No. 22	LP Field; Nashville, TN	W 45–24	6,393	
November 15	at Jacksonville State	No. 18	Paul Snow Stadium; Jacksonville, AL	L 21–26	7,956	
November 22	at Murray State	No. 25	Roy Stewart Stadium; Murray, KY	L 17–24		
*Non-conference game; ^{†}Homecoming; Rankings from The Sports Network Poll released prior to the game
