= 2008 UMass Minutemen football team =

American college football season

2008 UMass Minutemen football
- Conference: Colonial Athletic Association
- North Division
- Record: 7–5 (4–4 CAA)
- Head coach: Don Brown (5th season)
- Offensive coordinator: Kevin Morris (5th season)
- Offensive scheme: Pro-style
- Defensive coordinator: Keith Dudzinski (5th season)
- Base defense: 4–3
- Home stadium: Warren McGuirk Alumni Stadium

2008 Colonial Athletic Association football standings
| | Conf. | | | Overall |
| Team | W | | L | W | | L |
|---|---|---|---|---|---|---|
North Division
| No. 8 New Hampshire x^ | 6 | – | 2 | 10 | – | 3 |
| No. 18 Maine ^ | 5 | – | 3 | 8 | – | 5 |
| UMass | 4 | – | 4 | 7 | – | 5 |
| Hofstra | 2 | – | 6 | 4 | – | 8 |
| Rhode Island | 1 | – | 7 | 3 | – | 9 |
| Northeastern | 1 | – | 7 | 2 | – | 10 |
South Division
| No. 3 James Madison x$^ | 8 | – | 0 | 12 | – | 2 |
| No. 6 Villanova ^ | 7 | – | 1 | 10 | – | 3 |
| No. 1 Richmond ^ | 6 | – | 2 | 13 | – | 3 |
| No. 20 William & Mary | 5 | – | 3 | 7 | – | 4 |
| Delaware | 2 | – | 6 | 4 | – | 8 |
| Towson | 1 | – | 7 | 3 | – | 9 |
$ – Conference champion; x – Division champion/co-champions; ^ – FCS playoff participant; Rankings from The Sports Network poll

The 2008 UMass Minutemen football team represented the University of Massachusetts Amherst in the 2008 NCAA Division I FCS football season as a member of the Colonial Athletic Association. The team was coached by Don Brown and returned eight of 11 starters from the previous season. The Minutemen finished the season with a record of 7–5 (4–4 CAA), missing the playoffs for the first time since 2005.

The team played its home games at Warren McGuirk Alumni Stadium in Hadley, Massachusetts. The 2008 season was Brown's last as head coach of the Minutemen. He left the position the following season to become the defensive coordinator at Maryland.

== Schedule ==
| Date | Time | Opponent | Rank | Site | TV | Result | Attendance |
|---|---|---|---|---|---|---|---|
| August 30 | 6:00 p.m. | Albany* | No. 5 | McGuirk Stadium; Hadley, MA | | W 28–16 | 15,112 |
| September 6 | 1:00 p.m. | at Holy Cross* | No. 4 | Fitton Field; Worcester, MA | Charter TV3 | W 45–42 | 12,871 |
| September 13 | 3:30 p.m. | at No. 7 James Madison | No. 3 | Bridgeforth Stadium; Harrisonburg, VA | CN8 | L 38–52 | 15,747 |
| September 20 | 7:00 p.m. | at No. 11 (FBS) Texas Tech* | No. 9 | Jones AT&T Stadium; Lubbock, TX | | L 14–56 | 53,190 |
| October 4 | 1:00 p.m. | No. 16 Delaware | No. 18 | McGuirk Stadium; Hadley, MA | CN8 | W 17–7 | 16,422 |
| October 11 | 12:30 p.m. | at Northeastern | No. 13 | Parsons Field; Brookline, MA | CSN NE | W 28–24 | 4,155 |
| October 18 | 3:30 p.m. | No. 9 Richmond^{†} | No. 10 | McGuirk Stadium; Hadley, MA | CN8 | L 15–30 | 15,953 |
| October 25 | 1:00 p.m. | Bryant* | No. 17 | McGuirk Stadium; Hadley, MA | | W 42–7 | 12,521 |
| November 1 | 12:00 p.m. | at Rhode Island | No. 15 | Meade Stadium; Kingston, RI | | W 49–0 | 7,201 |
| November 8 | 12:00 p.m. | Maine | No. 13 | McGuirk Stadium; Hadley, MA | CSN NE, CSN MA | L 20–21 | 9,182 |
| November 15 | 12:00 p.m. | at No. 13 New Hampshire | No. 22 | Cowell Stadium; Durham, NH (rivalry) | CSN NE, CSN MA | L 21–52 | 6,231 |
| November 22 | 2:30 p.m. | Hofstra | | McGuirk Stadium; Hadley, MA | CN8 | W 28–14 | 5,108 |
*Non-conference game; ^{†}Homecoming; Rankings from The Sports Network Poll released prior to the game; All times are in Eastern time

== Roster ==
- QB: Liam Coen, Spencer Whipple
- FB: Emil Igwenagu
- WR: Victor Cruz, Jeremy Horne, Tom Gilson, Julian Talley
- TE: Brad Listorti
- OL: Josh Samuda, Vladimir Ducasse
- DL: Brandon Collier
- SS: Jeromy Miles
