= 2008 Villanova Wildcats football team =

American college football season

2008 Villanova Wildcats football

NCAA Division I Quarterfinal, L 27–31 vs James Madison
- Conference: Colonial Athletic Association
- South Division

Ranking
- Sports Network: No. 6
- Record: 10–3 (7–1 CAA)
- Head coach: Andy Talley (24th season)
- Offensive coordinator: Sam Venuto (10th season)
- Offensive scheme: Multiple spread
- Defensive coordinator: Mark Reardon (4th season)
- Base defense: 4–2–5
- Home stadium: Villanova Stadium

2008 Colonial Athletic Association football standings
	Conf.			Overall
Team	W		L	W		L
North Division
No. 8 New Hampshire x^	6	–	2	10	–	3
No. 18 Maine ^	5	–	3	8	–	5
UMass	4	–	4	7	–	5
Hofstra	2	–	6	4	–	8
Rhode Island	1	–	7	3	–	9
Northeastern	1	–	7	2	–	10
South Division
No. 3 James Madison x$^	8	–	0	12	–	2
No. 6 Villanova ^	7	–	1	10	–	3
No. 1 Richmond ^	6	–	2	13	–	3
No. 20 William & Mary	5	–	3	7	–	4
Delaware	2	–	6	4	–	8
Towson	1	–	7	3	–	9
$ – Conference champion; x – Division champion/co-champions; ^ – FCS playoff participant; Rankings from The Sports Network poll

The 2008 Villanova Wildcats football team was an American football team that represented the Villanova University as a member of the Atlantic 10 Conference during the 2008 NCAA Division I FCS football season. In their 24th year under head coach Andy Talley, the team compiled a 10–3 record.

== Schedule ==
Date	Time	Opponent	Rank	Site	TV	Result	Attendance	Source
August 30	3:30 p.m.	at No. 8 (FCS) West Virginia*		Mountaineer Field; Morgantown, WV	ESPN+	L 21–48	60,566	
September 13		Lehigh*	No. 21	Villanova Stadium; Villanova, PA		W 33–14	11,101	
September 20	3:30 p.m.	at Penn*	No. 19	Franklin Field; Philadelphia, PA	Comcast	W 20–14 ^{OT}	14,758	
September 27	3:30 p.m.	No. 1 Richmond	No. 19	Villanova Stadium; Villanova, PA	CN8	W 26–20	6,107	
October 4	1:00 p.m.	at William & Mary	No. 14	Zable Stadium; Williamsburg, VA		W 38–28	10,632	
October 18		at Rhode Island	No. 7	Meade Stadium; Kingston, RI		W 44–7		
October 25	3:30 p.m.	No. 1 James Madison	No. 7	Villanova Stadium; Villanova, PA	Comcast	L 19–23	6,721	
November 1		at Northeastern	No. 7	Parsons Field; Brookline, MA		W 20–14	2,205	
November 8	3:30 p.m.	No. 8 New Hampshire	No. 6	Villanova Stadium; Villanova, PA	CN8	W 24–13	6,627	
November 15	1:00 p.m.	Towson	No. 6	Villanova Stadium; Villanova, PA		W 34–31	5,101	
November 22	2:30 p.m.	at Delaware	No. 7	Delaware Stadium; Newark, DE (Battle of the Blue)	CN8	W 21–7	21,457	
November 29		No. 17 Colgate*	No. 6	Villanova Stadium; Villanova, PA (NCAA Division I First Round)		W 55–28	4,489	
December 6	3:30 p.m.	at No. 1 James Madison	No. 6	Bridgeforth Stadium; Harrisonburg, VA (NCAA Division I Quarterfinal)	ESPNGP	L 27–31	13,780	
*Non-conference game; Rankings from The Sports Network Poll released prior to the game; All times are in Eastern time
