= 2008 Richmond Spiders football team =

American college football season

2008 Richmond Spiders football

NCAA Division I champion

NCAA Division I Championship Game, W 24–7 vs. Montana
- Conference: Colonial Athletic Association
- South

Ranking
- Sports Network: No. 1
- FCS Coaches: No. 1
- Record: 13–3 (6–2 CAA)
- Head coach: Mike London (1st season)
- Offensive coordinator: Mike Faragalli (1st season)
- Defensive coordinator: Russ Huesman (5th season)
- Home stadium: University of Richmond Stadium

2008 Colonial Athletic Association football standings
	Conf.			Overall
Team	W		L	W		L
North Division
No. 8 New Hampshire x^	6	–	2	10	–	3
No. 18 Maine ^	5	–	3	8	–	5
UMass	4	–	4	7	–	5
Hofstra	2	–	6	4	–	8
Rhode Island	1	–	7	3	–	9
Northeastern	1	–	7	2	–	10
South Division
No. 3 James Madison x$^	8	–	0	12	–	2
No. 6 Villanova ^	7	–	1	10	–	3
No. 1 Richmond ^	6	–	2	13	–	3
No. 20 William & Mary	5	–	3	7	–	4
Delaware	2	–	6	4	–	8
Towson	1	–	7	3	–	9
$ – Conference champion; x – Division champion/co-champions; ^ – FCS playoff participant; Rankings from The Sports Network poll

The 2008 Richmond Spiders football team represented the University of Richmond during the 2008 NCAA Division I FCS football season. Richmond competed as a member of the Colonial Athletic Association (CAA), and played their home games at the University of Richmond Stadium.

The Spiders were led by first-year head coach Mike London. Richmond finished the regular season with a 9–3 overall record and 6–2 record in conference play. After suffering three defeats, the Spiders secured an at-large berth for the FCS playoffs. At home they defeated Eastern Kentucky, and then on the road, Richmond beat Appalachian State and Northern Iowa to advance to the championship game. In Chattanooga, Richmond defeated Montana, 24–7, to earn the NCAA Division I FCS championship. It was the University of Richmond's first NCAA national title in any sport.

== Schedule ==
Date	Time	Opponent	Rank	Site	TV	Result	Attendance	Source
August 30	7:00 pm	at No. 15 Elon*	No. 4	Rhodes Stadium; Elon, NC		W 28–10	10,847	
September 6	3:45 pm	at Virginia*	No. 3	Scott Stadium; Charlottesville, VA	ESPNU	L 0–16	51,007	
September 13	3:00 pm	Towson	No. 4	University of Richmond Stadium; Richmond, VA		W 45–14	8,012	
September 20	3:00 pm	Maine	No. 2	University of Richmond Stadium; Richmond, VA		W 44–17	8,012	
September 27	3:30 pm	at No. 19 Villanova	No. 1	Villanova Stadium; Villanova, PA	CN8	L 20–26	6,107	
October 4	1:30 pm	at VMI*	No. 6	Alumni Memorial Field; Lexington, VA		W 56–16	7,643	
October 11	3:30 pm	No. 1 James Madison	No. 5	University of Richmond Stadium; Richmond, VA	CSN	L 31–38	16,151	
October 18	3:30 pm	at No. 10 UMass	No. 9	Warren McGuirk Alumni Stadium; Hadley, MA	CN8	W 30–15	15,953	
October 25	3:00 pm	Georgetown*^{†}	No. 9	University of Richmond Stadium; Richmond, VA		W 48–0	5,168	
November 8	1:00 pm	at Hofstra	No. 7	Shuart Stadium; Hempstead, NY		W 34–14	1,766	
November 15	3:30 pm	Delaware	No. 7	University of Richmond Stadium; Richmond, VA	CN8	W 31–14	6,173	
November 22	12:00 pm	at No. 16 William & Mary	No. 7	Zable Stadium; Williamsburg, VA (I-64 Bowl)	CSN	W 23–20 ^{OT}	9,405	
November 29	1:00 pm	No. 21 Eastern Kentucky*	No. 7	University of Richmond Stadium; Richmond, VA (NCAA Division I First Round)		W 38–10	2,994	
December 6	12:00 pm	at No. 2 Appalachian State*	No. 7	Kidd Brewer Stadium; Boone, NC (NCAA Division I Quarterfinal)	ESPNGP	W 33–13	15,215	
December 13	4:00 pm	at No. 4 Northern Iowa*	No. 7	UNI-Dome; Cedar Falls, IA (NCAA Division I Semifinal)	ESPN	W 21–20	12,062	
December 19	8:00 pm	vs. No. 5 Montana*	No. 7	Finley Stadium; Chattanooga, TN (NCAA Division I Championship Game)	ESPN2	W 24–7	17,823	
*Non-conference game; ^{†}Homecoming; Rankings from The Sports Network Poll released prior to the game; All times are in Eastern time
