= 2008 New Hampshire Wildcats football team =

American college football season

2008 New Hampshire Wildcats football

CAA North Division champion

FCS Playoffs Quarterfinal, L 34–36 vs. Northern Iowa
- Conference: Colonial Athletic Association

Ranking
- Sports Network: No. 8
- FCS Coaches: No. 7
- Record: 10–3 (6–2 CAA)
- Head coach: Sean McDonnell (10th season)
- Home stadium: Cowell Stadium

2008 Colonial Athletic Association football standings
	Conf.			Overall
Team	W		L	W		L
North Division
No. 8 New Hampshire x^	6	–	2	10	–	3
No. 18 Maine ^	5	–	3	8	–	5
UMass	4	–	4	7	–	5
Hofstra	2	–	6	4	–	8
Rhode Island	1	–	7	3	–	9
Northeastern	1	–	7	2	–	10
South Division
No. 3 James Madison x$^	8	–	0	12	–	2
No. 6 Villanova ^	7	–	1	10	–	3
No. 1 Richmond ^	6	–	2	13	–	3
No. 20 William & Mary	5	–	3	7	–	4
Delaware	2	–	6	4	–	8
Towson	1	–	7	3	–	9
$ – Conference champion; x – Division champion/co-champions; ^ – FCS playoff participant; Rankings from The Sports Network poll

The 2008 New Hampshire Wildcats football team represented the University of New Hampshire in the 2008 NCAA Division I FCS football season. The Wildcats were led by 10th-year head coach Sean McDonnell and played their home games at Cowell Stadium in Durham, New Hampshire. They were a member of the Colonial Athletic Association. They finished the season 10–3, 6–2 in CAA play . They received an at-large bid into the FCS playoffs where they lost in the quarterfinals to Northern Iowa.

== Schedule ==
Date	Time	Opponent	Rank	Site	TV	Result	Attendance	Source
September 6	1:00 pm	at Army*	No. 15	Michie Stadium; West Point, NY	ESPNC	W 28–10	25,762	
September 13	12:00 pm	at Rhode Island	No. 10	Meade Stadium; Kingston, RI	CN8	W 51–43	4,113	
September 20	12:00 pm	Albany*	No. 10	Cowell Stadium; Durham, NH		W 32–24	7,215	
September 27	12:00 pm	at Dartmouth*	No. 7	Memorial Field; Hanover, NH (rivalry)	WMUR	W 42–6	4,427	
October 11	12:00 pm	William & Mary^{†}	No. 4	Cowell Stadium; Durham, NH		L 34–38	13,255	
October 18	12:00 pm	at Northeastern	No. 11	Parsons Field; Brookline, MA	CSN	W 33–21	6,109	
October 25	12:00 pm	Towson	No. 10	Cowell Stadium; Durham, NH	CSN	W 41–14	8,003	
November 1	12:00 pm	Hofstra	No. 9	Cowell Stadium; Durham, NH		W 45–25	5,297	
November 8	3:30 pm	at No. 6 Villanova	No. 8	Villanova Stadium; Villanova, PA	CN8	L 13–24	6,627	
November 15	12:00 pm	No. 22 UMass	No. 13	Cowell Stadium; Durham, NH (Rivalry)	CSN	W 52–21	6,231	
November 22	12:00 pm	at No. 17 Maine	No. 11	Alfond Stadium; Orono, ME (Battle for the Brice–Cowell Musket)		W 28–24	5,719	
November 29	2:00 pm	at No. 9 Southern Illinois*	No. 10	McAndrew Stadium; Carbondale, IL (NCAA Division I First Round)		W 29–20	5,461	
December 6	7:00 pm	at No. 4 Northern Iowa*	No. 10	UNI-Dome; Cedar Falls, IA (NCAA Division I Quarterfinal)	ESPN360	L 34–36	9,055	
*Non-conference game; ^{†}Homecoming; Rankings from The Sports Network Poll released prior to the game; All times are in Eastern time
