= Eddie Allen (American football coach) =

American football coach and player (born 1980)

Current position
- Title: Special teams coordinator
- Team: Rutgers
- Conference: Big Ten

Biographical details
- Born: October 24, 1980 (age 46); Somerville, New Jersey, U.S.
- Education: New Haven University (2003)

Playing career
- 1998–2002: New Haven
- Position: Quarterback

Coaching career (HC unless noted)
- 2003: Hofstra (GA)
- 2004: Fort Scott (WR)
- 2005–2007: Rutgers (GA)
- 2008–2013: Rhode Island (ST/RB)
- 2014–2017: Delaware (ST/TE)
- 2018–2021: Connecticut (ST)
- 2022–present: Rutgers (STC)

Edward Allen (born October 24, 1980) is an American college football coach and former player. He currently is a special teams assistant for Rutgers. He previously was recently the Special Teams Coordinator at the University of Connecticut. He has coordinated special teams for the majority of his coaching career. Before UConn, Allen had coaching stops at Hofstra, Fort Scott Community College, Rutgers, Rhode Island, and Delaware.

== Playing career ==
Allen played quarterback for the New Haven Chargers, an NCAA Division II school in West Haven, Connecticut. He was a four-year letterwinner for head coach and offensive coordinator, and former Miami Dolphins and Oakland Raiders head coach, Tony Sparano.

== Coaching career ==
Allen got his coaching start in 2003 as a graduate assistant and video coordinator at Hofstra.

In 2004, Allen coached the wide receivers at Fort Scott Community College.

The next three years, 2005–2007, Allen was on Greg Schiano’s staff at Rutgers. In 05 and 06, Allen worked as a player development assistant, before moving into a graduate assistant role in 2007.

From 2008 to 2013, Allen was in charge of the special teams for Rhode Island.

From 2014 to 2017, Allen was the Special Teams Coordinator and tight ends coach. While there, he helped develop All-American tight end and Baltimore Ravens draft selection, Nick Boyle.

In February 2018, UConn Head Coach Randy Edsall announced Eddie Allen as his new special teams coordinator. He was paid $165,000 annually.

== Personal life ==
Allen and his wife, Kristin, have four children, daughters, Makayla and Brooklyn, and sons Austin and Jackson.
