= Roy Istvan =

American football coach

Florida Gators
- Title: Offensive analyst

Personal information
- Born: December 27, 1968 (age 57); Stratford, Connecticut, U.S.

Career information
- College: Southern Connecticut

Career history
- Southern Connecticut (1990–1995) Graduate assistant; Southern Connecticut (1996–2000) Offensive coordinator; Buffalo (2001–2003) Run game coordinator & offensive line; Buffalo (2004–2005) Offensive coordinator; Milford Academy (NY) (2006–2007) Offensive coordinator; Rhode Island (2008) Offensive line coach; Rhode Island (2009–2013) Assistant head coach & offensive line coach; Rhode Island (2011–2013) Offensive coordinator; Cornell (2014–2016) Offensive coordinator & offensive line coach; Keiser (2018) Assistant head coach, offensive coordinator, & offensive line coach; Philadelphia Eagles (2019–2023) Assistant offensive line coach; Cleveland Browns (2024) Assistant offensive line coach; Florida (2025-present) Offensive analyst

Roy Istvan (born December 27, 1968) is an American football coach who is the assistant offensive line coach for the Cleveland Browns of the National Football League (NFL). He is married to Kristin Istvan with whom he has three children.

After coaching for 28 years at the college level, in 2019, Istvan was hired by the Philadelphia Eagles as the assistant offensive line coach, serving under head coach Doug Pederson and offensive line coach Jeff Stoutland. Istvan was retained by head coach Nick Sirianni, who was hired after Pederson was fired in 2020.
