= 2008 NCAA Division I FCS football season =

American college football season

2008 NCAA Division I FCS season

Regular season
- Number of teams: 125
- Duration: August 28 – November 22
- Payton Award: Armanti Edwards
- Buchanan Award: Greg Peach

Playoff
- Duration: November 29 – December 19
- Championship date: December 19, 2008
- Championship site: Finley Stadium; Chattanooga, Tennessee
- Champion: Richmond

NCAA Division I FCS football seasons
- «2007 2009»

The 2008 NCAA Division I FCS football season, the 2008 season of college football for teams in the Football Championship Subdivision (FCS), began on August 28, 2008, and concluded on December 19, 2008, in Chattanooga, Tennessee, at the 2008 NCAA Division I Football Championship Game, where the Richmond Spiders defeated the Montana Grizzlies to win the NCAA Division I Football Championship.

This was the first season in which a standard provision of NCAA rules allowed FCS teams to schedule 12 regular-season games (not counting conference championship games). In years when the period starting with the Thursday before Labor Day and ending with the final Saturday in November contains 14 Saturdays, FCS programs may play 12 games instead of the regular 11.

== Conference changes and new programs ==
- The Gateway Football Conference adopted its present-day name, Missouri Valley Football Conference (MVFC).
- Following the 2007 season, the Metro Atlantic Athletic Conference dropped its football sponsorship.

School	2007 Conference	2008 Conference
Bryant	Northeast-10 (D-II)	FCS Independent
Campbell	New Program	Pioneer
Duquesne	MAAC	NEC
Iona	MAAC	FCS Independent
La Salle	MAAC	Dropped Program
Marist	MAAC	FCS Independent
North Carolina Central	D-II Independent	FCS Independent
North Dakota	North Central (D-II)	Great West (FCS)
North Dakota State	Great West	MVFC
Presbyterian	FCS Independent	Big South
Samford	Ohio Valley	SoCon
South Dakota	North Central (D-II)	Great West (FCS)
South Dakota State	Great West	MVFC
Stony Brook	FCS Independent	Big South
Western Kentucky	FCS Independent	FBS Independent

== FCS team wins over FBS teams ==
August 30 – Cal Poly 29, San Diego State 27
September 6 – New Hampshire 28, Army 10

== Notable upsets ==
- August 30 – Arkansas–Monticello 21, Arkansas-Pine Bluff 0 (Division II over Division I FCS)
- August 31 – Fayetteville State 33, North Carolina Central 22 (Division II over Division I FCS)
- September 4 – St. Francis (IL) 21, Valparaiso 0 (NAIA over Division I FCS non-scholarship)
- September 4 – Washburn 35, Missouri State 27 (Division II over Division I FCS)
- September 5 – Stonehill 14, Wagner 13 (Division II over Division I FCS)
- September 6 – Methodist 32, Campbell 21 (Division III over Division I FCS non-scholarship)
- September 6 – UNC Pembroke 21, Davidson 9 (Division II over Division I FCS non-scholarship)
- September 6 – Henderson State 34, Arkansas-Pine Bluff 0 (Division II over Division I FCS)
- September 13 – Franklin (IN) 31, Butler 28 (Division III over Division I FCS non-scholarship)
- September 20 – UNC Pembroke 22, Jacksonville 21 (Division II over Division I FCS non-scholarship)
- September 20 – Marian (IN) 13, Valparaiso 10 (NAIA over Division I FCS non-scholarship)
- October 4 – Tuskegee 34, Alabama A&M 24 (Division II over Division I FCS)
- October 11 – Wesley (DE) 23, Iona 12 (Division III over Division I FCS non-scholarship)

== Conference standings ==
2008 Big Sky Conference football standings
	Conf.			Overall
Team	W		L	W		L
No. 2 Montana $^	7	–	1	14	–	2
No. 7 Weber State $^	7	–	1	10	–	4
Montana State	5	–	3	7	–	5
Eastern Washington	5	–	3	6	–	5
Northern Arizona	4	–	4	6	–	5
Sacramento State	3	–	5	6	–	6
Portland State	3	–	5	4	–	7
Northern Colorado	1	–	7	1	–	10
Idaho State	1	–	7	1	–	11
$ – Conference champion; ^ – FCS playoff participant; Rankings from The Sports Network poll

2008 Big South Conference football standings
	Conf.			Overall
Team	W		L	W		L
No. 14 Liberty $	5	–	0	10	–	2
Stony Brook	3	–	2	5	–	6
Charleston Southern	3	–	2	7	–	5
Gardner–Webb	2	–	3	5	–	6
Coastal Carolina	1	–	4	6	–	6
VMI	1	–	4	4	–	7
Presbyterian	1	–	4	4	–	8
$ – Conference champion; Rankings from The Sports Network poll

2008 Colonial Athletic Association football standings
	Conf.			Overall
Team	W		L	W		L
North Division
No. 8 New Hampshire x^	6	–	2	10	–	3
No. 18 Maine ^	5	–	3	8	–	5
UMass	4	–	4	7	–	5
Hofstra	2	–	6	4	–	8
Rhode Island	1	–	7	3	–	9
Northeastern	1	–	7	2	–	10
South Division
No. 3 James Madison x$^	8	–	0	12	–	2
No. 6 Villanova ^	7	–	1	10	–	3
No. 1 Richmond ^	6	–	2	13	–	3
No. 20 William & Mary	5	–	3	7	–	4
Delaware	2	–	6	4	–	8
Towson	1	–	7	3	–	9
$ – Conference champion; x – Division champion/co-champions; ^ – FCS playoff participant; Rankings from The Sports Network poll

2008 Great West Conference football standings
	Conf.			Overall
Team	W		L	W		L
No. 10 Cal Poly $^	3	–	0	8	–	3
UC Davis	2	–	1	5	–	7
North Dakota	1	–	2	6	–	4
South Dakota	1	–	2	6	–	5
Southern Utah	1	–	3	4	–	7
$ – Conference champion; ^ – FCS playoff participant; Rankings from The Sports Network poll

2008 Ivy League football standings
	Conf.			Overall
Team	W		L	W		L
No. 15 Harvard +	6	–	1	9	–	1
Brown +	6	–	1	7	–	3
Penn	5	–	2	6	–	4
Yale	4	–	3	6	–	4
Princeton	3	–	4	4	–	6
Cornell	2	–	5	4	–	6
Columbia	2	–	5	2	–	8
Dartmouth	0	–	7	0	–	10
+ – Conference co-champions; Rankings from The Sports Network poll

2008 Mid-Eastern Athletic Conference football standings
	Conf.			Overall
Team	W		L	W		L
No. 13 South Carolina State $^	8	–	0	10	–	2
Florida A&M	5	–	3	9	–	3
Bethune–Cookman	5	–	3	8	–	3
Hampton	5	–	3	6	–	5
Delaware State	5	–	3	5	–	6
Morgan State	4	–	4	6	–	6
Norfolk State	3	–	5	5	–	7
North Carolina A&T	1	–	7	3	–	9
Howard	0	–	8	1	–	10
Winston-Salem State *	0	–	0	3	–	8
$ – Conference champion; ^ – FCS playoff participant; * – Ineligible for conference championship; Rankings from The Sports Network poll

2008 Missouri Valley Football Conference standings
	Conf.			Overall
Team	W		L	W		L
No. 4 Northern Iowa +^	7	–	1	12	–	3
No. 11 Southern Illinois +^	7	–	1	9	–	3
South Dakota State	6	–	2	7	–	5
Western Illinois	4	–	4	6	–	5
North Dakota State	4	–	4	6	–	5
Missouri State	3	–	5	4	–	7
Youngstown State	3	–	5	4	–	8
Illinois State	2	–	6	3	–	8
Indiana State	0	–	8	0	–	12
+ – Conference co-champions; ^ – FCS playoff participant; Rankings from The Sports Network poll

2008 Northeast Conference football standings
	Conf.			Overall
Team	W		L	W		L
Albany $	7	–	0	9	–	3
Monmouth	6	–	1	7	–	5
Sacred Heart	4	–	3	8	–	3
Central Connecticut State	4	–	3	7	–	4
Robert Morris	4	–	3	5	–	6
Duquesne	2	–	5	3	–	7
Wagner	1	–	6	3	–	8
Saint Francis (PA)	0	–	7	0	–	11
$ – Conference champion

2008 Ohio Valley Conference football standings
	Conf.			Overall
Team	W		L	W		L
No. 19 Eastern Kentucky $^	7	–	1	8	–	4
Jacksonville State	6	–	2	8	–	3
Tennessee–Martin	6	–	2	8	–	4
Tennessee State	5	–	3	8	–	4
Murray State	4	–	4	5	–	7
Eastern Illinois	3	–	5	5	–	7
Southeast Missouri State	2	–	6	4	–	8
Austin Peay	2	–	6	2	–	9
Tennessee Tech	1	–	7	3	–	9
$ – Conference champion; ^ – FCS playoff participant; Rankings from The Sports Network poll

2008 Patriot League football standings
	Conf.			Overall
Team	W		L	W		L
No. 16 Colgate $^	5	–	0	9	–	3
Holy Cross	5	–	1	7	–	4
Lehigh	4	–	2	5	–	6
Lafayette	3	–	3	7	–	4
Bucknell	2	–	4	5	–	6
Fordham	1	–	5	5	–	6
Georgetown	0	–	5	2	–	8
$ – Conference champion; ^ – FCS playoff participant; Rankings from The Sports Network poll

2008 Pioneer Football League standings
	Conf.			Overall
Team	W		L	W		L
Jacksonville $	7	–	1	9	–	4
San Diego	6	–	2	9	–	2
Dayton	6	–	2	9	–	3
Butler	4	–	4	6	–	5
Drake	4	–	4	6	–	5
Morehead State	4	–	4	6	–	6
Davidson	3	–	5	4	–	7
Valparaiso	2	–	6	3	–	8
Campbell	0	–	8	1	–	10
$ – Conference champion

2008 Southern Conference football standings
	Conf.			Overall
Team	W		L	W		L
No. 5 Appalachian State $^	8	–	0	11	–	3
No. 9 Wofford ^	7	–	1	9	–	3
No. 17 Elon	6	–	2	8	–	4
Furman	4	–	4	7	–	5
Samford	4	–	4	6	–	5
Georgia Southern	4	–	4	6	–	5
The Citadel	2	–	6	4	–	8
Western Carolina	1	–	7	3	–	9
Chattanooga	0	–	8	1	–	11
$ – Conference champion; ^ – FCS playoff participant; Rankings from The Sports Network poll

2008 Southland Conference football standings
	Conf.			Overall
Team	W		L	W		L
No. 12 Central Arkansas* $	6	–	1	10	–	2
No. 22 Texas State ^	5	–	2	8	–	5
McNeese State	4	–	3	7	–	3
Northwestern State	4	–	3	7	–	5
Nicholls State	3	–	4	3	–	6
Southeastern Louisiana	2	–	5	5	–	7
Sam Houston State	2	–	5	4	–	6
Stephen F. Austin	2	–	5	4	–	8
$ – Conference champion; ^ – FCS playoff participant; * – Ineligible for postseason play due to transition from NCAA Division II; Rankings from The Sports Network poll

2008 Southwestern Athletic Conference football standings
	Conf.			Overall
Team	W		L	W		L
East Division
Jackson State xy	6	–	1	7	–	5
Alabama A&M	4	–	3	5	–	7
Alabama State	2	–	5	3	–	8
Mississippi Valley State	1	–	6	3	–	8
Alcorn State	1	–	6	2	–	10
West Division
Grambling State xy$	7	–	0	11	–	2
Prairie View A&M	6	–	1	9	–	1
Southern	5	–	2	6	–	5
Arkansas–Pine Bluff	2	–	5	3	–	9
Texas Southern	1	–	6	4	–	8
Championship: Grambling State 41, Jackson State 9
$ – Conference champion; x – Division champion/co-champions; y – Championship game participant

2008 NCAA Division I FCS independents football standings
	Conf.			Overall
Team	W		L	W		L
Bryant		–		7	–	4
Savannah State		–		5	–	7
Marist		–		4	–	7
North Carolina Central		–		4	–	7
Iona		–		3	–	8

== Conference champions ==
=== Automatic berths ===
Conference	Champion	Record*
Big Sky Conference	Montana	11–0, 8–0
Colonial Athletic Association	James Madison	10–1, 8–0
Missouri Valley Football Conference	Southern Illinois	9–2, 7–1
Mid-Eastern Athletic Conference	South Carolina State	10–2, 8–0
Ohio Valley Conference	Eastern Kentucky	8–3, 7–1
Patriot League	Colgate	9–2, 5–0
Southern Conference	Appalachian State	10–2, 8–0
Southland Conference	Texas State	8–4, 5–2

=== Invitation ===
Conference	Champion	Record*
Great West Conference	Cal Poly	8–2, 3–0
Big South Conference	Liberty	10–2, 5–0
Northeast Conference	Albany	8–3, 7–0
Pioneer Football League	Jacksonville	9–3, 7–1

=== Abstains ===
Conference	Champion	Record*
Ivy League	Brown	7–3, 6–1
Southwestern Athletic Conference	Grambling State	11–2, 7–0

*Overall record, Conference record

== Postseason ==
=== NCAA Division I playoff bracket ===
First Round
November 29
Campus sites

Quarterfinals
December 6
Campus sites

Semifinals
December 12 and December 13
Campus sites

National Championship Game

December 19
Finley Stadium
Chattanooga, Tennessee

Wofford
35

1
James Madison*
38

1
James Madison*
31

Villanova
27

Colgate
28

Villanova*
55

1
James Madison*
27

4
Montana
35

Texas State
13

4
Montana*
31

4
Montana*
24

Weber State
13

Weber State
49

Cal Poly*
35

4
Montana
7

7
Richmond
24

South Carolina State
21

2
Appalachian State*
37

2
Appalachian State*
13

Richmond
33

Eastern Kentucky
10

Richmond*
38

Richmond
21

3
Northern Iowa*
20

Maine
15

3
Northern Iowa*
40

3
Northern Iowa*
36

New Hampshire
34

New Hampshire
29

Southern Illinois*
20

* Host institution

=== SWAC Championship Game ===
Date	Location	Venue	West Div. Champion	East Div. Champion	Result
December 13	Birmingham, Alabama	Legion Field	Grambling State	Jackson State	Grambling State, 41–9

=== Gridiron Classic ===
The Gridiron Classic is an annual game between the champions of the Northeast Conference and the Pioneer Football League that has been held since December 2006.

Date	Location	Venue	NEC Champion	PFL Champion	Result
December 6	Albany, New York	University Field	Albany	Jacksonville	Albany, 28–0

== Final poll standings ==
Standings are from The Sports Network final 2008 poll.

Rank	Team	Record
1	Richmond Spiders	13–3
2	Montana Grizzlies	14–2
3	James Madison Dukes	12–2
4	Northern Iowa Panthers	12–3
5	Appalachian State Mountaineers	11–3
6	Villanova Wildcats	10–3
7	Weber State Wildcats	10–4
8	New Hampshire Wildcats	10–3
9	Wofford Terriers	9–3
10	Cal Poly Mustangs	8–3
11	Southern Illinois Salukis	9–3
12	Central Arkansas Bears	10–2
13	South Carolina State Bulldogs	10–3
14	Liberty Flames	10–2
15	Harvard Crimson	9–1
16	Colgate Raiders	9–3
17	Elon Phoenix	8–4
18	Maine Black Bears	8–5
19	Eastern Kentucky Colonels	8–4
20	William & Mary Tribe	7–4
21	McNeese State Cowboys	7–4
22	Texas State Bobcats	8–5
23	Jacksonville State Gamecocks	8–3
24	Grambling State Tigers	11–2
25	Prairie View A&M Panthers	9–1

== Rule changes for 2008 ==
The NCAA football rules committee made several rule changes for 2008, and included the following:

- The 25-second play clock was replaced by a 40-second version similar to one that was used in the NFL until 2005.
- The penalty for kicking the ball out of bounds on the kickoff is increased, placing the ball at the 40-yard line, similar to the NFL.
- All face-mask penalties result in a 15-yard penalty. Incidental contact with the face mask is no longer penalized.
- All horse-collar tackles are now subject to a 15-yard penalty.
- If a coach challenges a play and they win the challenge, they are given a second challenge to use later in the game, and each coach has a maximum of two challenges per game even if both are decided in their favor.

== Attendances ==
The top 30 NCAA Division I FCS football teams by average home attendance:

#	College football team	Average attendance
1	Appalachian State Mountaineers	25,161
2	Montana Grizzlies	23,923
3	Delaware Fightin' Blue Hens	21,609
4	Jackson State Tigers	21,263
5	Georgia Southern Eagles	18,168
6	North Dakota State Bison	18,032
7	Harvard Crimson	17,360
8	Southern Jaguars	16,323
9	Tennessee State Tigers	15,444
10	James Madison Dukes	15,362
11	Alabama State Hornets	15,218
12	Youngstown State Penguins	14,497
13	Florida A&M Rattlers	14,383
14	McNeese State Cowboys	13,829
15	Montana State Bobcats	13,406
16	South Carolina State Bulldogs	13,383
17	Liberty Flames	13,147
18	Massachusetts Minutemen	12,383
19	The Citadel Bulldogs	12,261
20	Northern Iowa Panthers	12,178
21	Penn Quakers	11,284
22	Jacksonville State Gamecocks	11,281
23	Texas State Bobcats	11,225
24	Grambling State Tigers	11,219
25	Yale Bulldogs	11,071
26	North Carolina A&T Aggies	10,764
27	Norfolk State Spartans	10,645
28	Illinois State Redbirds	10,591
29	Sam Houston State Bearkats	10,076
30	Furman Paladins	10,073
