= 2008 NCAA Division I FCS football rankings =

The 2008 NCAA Division I FCS football rankings are from the Sports Network media poll and the coaches poll. This is for the 2008 season.

== Legend ==
	Increase in ranking
	Decrease in ranking
	Not ranked previous week
(#–#)	Win–loss record
(Italics)	Number of first place votes
т	Tied with team above or below also with this symbol

== The Sports Network poll ==
	Preseason	Week 1 Sept 2	Week 2 Sept 9	Week 3 Sept 16	Week 4 Sept 23	Week 5 Sept 30	Week 6 Oct 7	Week 7 Oct 14	Week 8 Oct 21	Week 9 Oct 28	Week 10 Nov 4	Week 11 Nov 11	Week 12 Nov 18	Week 13 Nov 25	Week 14 Postseason	
1.	Appalachian State (97)	Appalachian State (0–1) (62)	Appalachian State (1–1) (85)	Appalachian State (1–1) (96)	Richmond (3–1) (49)	James Madison (4–1) (87)	James Madison (5–1) (104)	James Madison (6–1) (105)	James Madison (6–1) (102)	James Madison (7–1) (98)	James Madison (8–1) (91)	James Madison (8–1) (91)	James Madison (9–1) (106)	James Madison (10–1) (74)	Richmond (13–3) (80)	1.
2.	North Dakota State (1)	North Dakota State (1–0) (42)	North Dakota State (2–0) (22)	Richmond (2–1) (1)	James Madison (3–1) (37)	Appalachian State (2–2)	Appalachian State (3–2) (4)	Appalachian State (4–2) (1)	Appalachian State (5–2) (3)	Appalachian State (6–2) (3)	Appalachian State (7–2) (17)	Appalachian State (8–2) (17)	Appalachian State (9–2) (13)	Appalachian State (10–2) (7)	Montana (14–2)	2.
3.	Northern Iowa	Richmond (1–0) (4)	UMass (2–0) (1)	North Dakota State (2–1) (5)	Appalachian State (1–2)	Montana (4–0) (16)	McNeese State (3–1) (1)	Elon (6–1)	Elon (7–1)	Wofford (6–1) (2)	Cal Poly (6–1) (1)	Cal Poly (7–1) (2)	Cal Poly (8–1) (1)	Cal Poly (8–2)	James Madison (12–2)	3.
4.	Richmond	UMass (1–0)	Richmond (1–1)	Montana (2–0) (7)	Montana (3–0) (12)	McNeese State (2–1) (1)	New Hampshire (4–0) (2)	Wofford (4–1)	Wofford (5–1)	Cal Poly (5–1) (1)	Northern Iowa (7–2)	Northern Iowa (8–2)	Northern Iowa (9–2)	Northern Iowa (10–2)	Northern Iowa (12–3)	4.
5.	UMass (Note: In the actual printed polls, UMass was listed as Massachusetts)	Montana (0–0) (1)	Montana (1–0) (1)	James Madison (2–1) (2)	Northern Iowa (2–1) (2)	New Hampshire (4–0) (3)	Richmond (4–2)	Cal Poly (3–1)	Northern Iowa (5–2)	Northern Iowa (6–2)	Montana (8–1)	Montana (9–1)	Montana (10–1)	Montana (11–1)	Appalachian State (11–3)	5.
6.	James Madison (3)	Delaware (0–1)	Delaware (0–1) (1)	Delaware (1–1) (1)	McNeese State (1–1)	Richmond (3–2)	Elon (5–1)	Northern Iowa (4–2)	Cal Poly (4–1)	Montana (7–1)	Villanova (6–2)	Villanova (7–2)	Villanova (8–2)	Villanova (9–2)	Villanova (10–3)	6.
7.	Eastern Washington	Eastern Washington (0–1)	James Madison (1–1)	McNeese State (1–1)	New Hampshire (3–0) (1)	Elon (4–1)	Cal Poly (3–1)	Villanova (4–1)	Villanova (5–1)	Villanova (5–2)	Richmond (6–3)	Richmond (7–3)	Richmond (8–3)	Richmond (9–3)	Weber State (10–4)	7.
8.	Montana	James Madison (0–1)	McNeese State (1–1)	Northern Iowa (1–1)	Elon (3–1)	Cal Poly (2–1)	Wofford (3–1)	Montana (5–1)	Montana (6–1)	Richmond (6–3)	New Hampshire (7–1)	Weber State (9–2)	Weber State (9–2)	Wofford (9–2)	New Hampshire (10–3)	8.
9.	Delaware	Northern Iowa (0–1)	Northern Iowa (1–1)	UMass (2–1)	Cal Poly (2–1)	Wofford (3–1)	Villanova (4–1)	Richmond (4–3)	Richmond (5–3)	New Hampshire (6–1)	Weber State (8–2)	Wofford (7–2)	Wofford (8–2)	Southern Illinois (9–2)	Wofford (9–3)	9.
10.	McNeese State	McNeese State (0–1)	New Hampshire (1–0)	New Hampshire (2–0) (1)	North Dakota State (2–2)	Northern Iowa (2–2)	Northern Iowa (3–2)	UMass (4–2)	New Hampshire (5–1)	Elon (7–2)	Wofford (6–2)	Southern Illinois (7–2)	Southern Illinois (8–2)	New Hampshire (9–2)	Cal Poly (8–3)	10.
11.	Southern Illinois	Cal Poly (1–0)	Southern Illinois (1–0)	Wofford (2–0)	Eastern Washington (1–2)	Eastern Washington (2–2)	North Dakota State (3–2)	New Hampshire (4–1)	McNeese State (4–2)	Central Arkansas (7–1)	Elon (7–2)	Elon (8–2)	New Hampshire (8–2)	Central Arkansas (10–2)	Southern Illinois (9–3)	11.
12.	Youngstown State	Southern Illinois (0–0)	Wofford (2–0)	South Dakota State (2–1)	Central Arkansas (4–0)	The Citadel (3–1)	Montana (4–1)	McNeese State (3–2)	Western Illinois (5–2)	Western Illinois (5–2)	Southern Illinois (6–2)	William & Mary (7–2)	Elon (8–3)	Weber State (9–3)	Central Arkansas (10–2)	12.
13.	Wofford	Wofford (1–0)	South Dakota State (1–1)	Cal Poly (1–1)	The Citadel (2–1)	Southern Illinois (2–1)	UMass (3–2)	Central Arkansas (5–1)	Central Arkansas (6–1)	Weber State (7–2)	UMass (6–3)	New Hampshire (7–2)	Central Arkansas (9–2)	South Carolina State (10–2)	South Carolina State (10–3)	13.
14.	Cal Poly	Youngstown State (0–1)	Cal Poly (1–1)	Eastern Washington (0–2)	Wofford (2–1)	Villanova (3–1)	Central Arkansas (4–1)	Liberty (6–0)	Southern Illinois (4–2)	Southern Illinois (5–2)	William & Mary (6–2)	Furman (7–3)	McNeese State (7–3)	Liberty (10–2)	Liberty (10–2)	14.
15.	Elon	New Hampshire (0–0)	Western Illinois (1–1)	Southern Illinois (1–1)	Southern Illinois (1–1)	Furman (4–1) (1)	Liberty (5–0)	Western Illinois (4–2)	Northern Arizona (6–1)	UMass (5–3)	Furman (7–3)	Central Arkansas (8–2)	South Carolina State (9–2)	Harvard (9–1)	Harvard (9–1)	15.
16.	New Hampshire	Georgia Southern (0–1)	Eastern Washington (0–2)	Georgia Southern (2–1)	Furman (3–1)	Delaware (2–2)	Southern Illinois (2–2)	Southern Illinois (3–2)	Weber State (6–2)	William & Mary (5–2)	Central Arkansas (7–2)	McNeese State (6–3)	William & Mary (7–3)	Colgate (9–2)	Colgate (9–3)	16.
17.	Georgia Southern	Elon (0–1)	Georgia Southern (1–1)	Elon (2–1)	Delaware (1–2)	North Dakota State (2–2)	Western Illinois (3–2)	Northern Arizona (5–1)	UMass (4–3)	Liberty (7–1)	Western Illinois (5–3)	South Carolina State (8–2)	Maine (8–3)	Elon (8–4)	Elon (8–4)	17.
18.	Eastern Illinois	Western Illinois (0–1)	Elon (1–1)	Central Arkansas (3–0)	UMass (2–2)	UMass (2–2)	Northern Arizona (4–1)	Weber State (5–2)	Furman (6–2)	Furman (6–3)	McNeese State (5–3)	Tennessee State (8–2)	Tennessee–Martin (8–3)	McNeese State (7–4)	Maine (8–5)	18.
19.	South Dakota State	Eastern Illinois (0–1)	Central Arkansas (2–0)	Villanova (1–1)	Villanova (2–1)	Central Arkansas (4–1)	Jacksonville State (4–1)	Furman (5–2)	Tennessee State (6–1)	Northern Arizona (6–2)	South Carolina State (7–2)	Harvard (7–1)	Harvard (8–1)	William & Mary (7–4)	Eastern Kentucky (8–4)	19.
20.	Eastern Kentucky	The Citadel (1–0)	Eastern Illinois (0–2)	Western Illinois (1–2)	South Dakota State (2–2)	Liberty (4–0)	Furman (4–2)	North Dakota State (3–3)	Liberty (6–1)	McNeese State (4–3)	Tennessee–Martin (7–2)	Tennessee–Martin (7–3)	Furman (7–4)	Maine (8–4)	William & Mary (7–4)	20.
21.	Villanova	South Dakota State (0–1)	Villanova (0–1)	The Citadel (1–1)	Eastern Illinois (2–2)	Western Illinois (2–2)	The Citadel (3–2)	South Dakota State (3–3)	Jacksonville State (5–2)	Lafayette (6–1)	Harvard (6–1)	Maine (7–3)	Colgate (8–2)	Eastern Kentucky (8–3)	McNeese State (7–4)	21.
22.	Central Arkansas	Central Arkansas (1–0)	The Citadel (1–1)	Eastern Illinois (1–2)	Western Illinois (2–2)	Jacksonville State (3–1)	Weber State (4–2)	Tennessee State (5–1)	Hampton (5–1)	South Carolina State (6–2)	Tennessee State (7–2)	UMass (6–4)	Liberty (9–2)	Jacksonville State (8–3)	Texas State (8–5)	22.
23.	The Citadel	Villanova (0–1)	Youngstown State (0–2)	Liberty (3–0)	Tennessee State (4–0)	South Dakota State (3–2)	Eastern Washington (2–3)	Jacksonville State (4–2)	William & Mary (4–2)	Harvard (5–1)	Northern Arizona (6–3)	Colgate (8–2)	Western Illinois (6–4)	Texas State (8–4)	Jacksonville State (8–3)	23.
24.	Harvard	Eastern Kentucky (0–1)	Harvard (0–0)	Furman (2–1)	Georgia Southern (2–2)	Northern Arizona (3–1)	Delaware (2–3)	The Citadel (3–3)	Lafayette (5–1)	Tennessee–Martin (7–2)	Colgate (7–2)	Liberty (8–2)	Jacksonville State (8–3)	Tennessee–Martin (8–4)	Grambling State (11–2)	24.
25.	Western Illinois	Harvard (0–0)	Liberty (2–0)	Tennessee State (3–0)	Liberty (3–0)	Brown (2–0)	South Dakota State (3–3)	Hampton (4–1)	Harvard (4–1)	Tennessee State (6–2)	Liberty (7–2)	Western Illinois (5–4)	Tennessee State (8–3)	Prairie View A&M (9–1)	Prairie View A&M (9–1)	25.
	Preseason	Week 1 Sept 2	Week 2 Sept 9	Week 3 Sept 16	Week 4 Sept 23	Week 5 Sept 30	Week 6 Oct 7	Week 7 Oct 14	Week 8 Oct 21	Week 9 Oct 28	Week 10 Nov 4	Week 11 Nov 11	Week 12 Nov 18	Week 13 Nov 25	Week 14 Postseason	
		None	Dropped: 24 Eastern Kentucky	Dropped: 23 Youngstown State; 24 Harvard	None	Dropped: 21 Eastern Illinois; 23 Tennessee State; 24 Georgia Southern	Dropped: 25 Brown	Dropped: 23 Eastern Washington; 24 Delaware	Dropped: 20 North Dakota State; 21 South Dakota State; 24 The Citadel	Dropped: 21 Jacksonville State; 22 Hampton	Dropped: 21 Lafayette	Dropped: 23 Northern Arizona	Dropped: 22 UMass	Dropped: 20 Furman; 23 Western Illinois; 25 Tennessee State	Dropped: 24 Tennessee–Martin	

== The Coaches poll ==
	Preseason	Week 1 Sept 2	Week 2 Sept 9	Week 3 Sept 16	Week 4 Sept 23	Week 5 Sept 30	Week 6 Oct 7	Week 7 Oct 14	Week 8 Oct 21	Week 9 Oct 28	Week 10 Nov 4	Week 11 Nov 11	Week 12 Nov 18	Week 13 Nov 25	Week 14 Postseason	
1.	Appalachian State (24)	North Dakota State (1–0) (13)	North Dakota State (2–0) (20)	Appalachian State (1–1) (17)	James Madison (3–1) (11)	James Madison (4–1) (23)	James Madison (5–1) (28)	James Madison (6–1) (28)	James Madison (6–1) (27)	James Madison (7–1) (27)	James Madison (8–1) (28)	James Madison (8–1) (27)	James Madison (9–1) (28)	James Madison (10–1) (25)	Richmond (13–3)	1.
2.	North Dakota State	Appalachian State (0–1) (12)	Appalachian State (1–1) (7)	North Dakota State (2–1) (9)	Richmond (3–1) (11)	Montana (4–0) (4)	Appalachian State (3–2)	Appalachian State (4–2)	Appalachian State (5–2)	Appalachian State (6–2)	Appalachian State (7–2)	Appalachian State (8–2)	Appalachian State (9–2)	Appalachian State (10–2)	Montana (14–2)	2.
3.	James Madison	Richmond (1–0) (1)	Montana (1–0)	Richmond (2–1)	Montana (3–0) (6)	Appalachian State (2–2)	McNeese State (3–1)	Cal Poly (3–1)	Cal Poly (4–1)	Cal Poly (5–1)	Cal Poly (6–1)	Cal Poly (7–1)	Cal Poly (8–1)	Cal Poly (8–2)	James Madison (12–2)	3.
4.	Northern Iowa	UMass (1–0)	Richmond (1–1)	Montana (2–0) (2)	Appalachian State (1–2)	McNeese State (2–1)	New Hampshire (4–0)	Northern Iowa (4–2)	Northern Iowa (5–2)	Northern Iowa (6–2)	Northern Iowa (7–2)	Northern Iowa (8–2) (1)	Northern Iowa (9–2)	Northern Iowa (10–2)	Northern Iowa (12–3)	4.
5.	UMass	Northern Iowa (0–1)	UMass (2–0)	James Madison (2–1)	Northern Iowa (2–1)	New Hampshire (4–0)	Richmond (4–2)	Montana (5–1)	Montana (6–1)	Wofford (6–1) (1)	Montana (8–1)	Montana (9–1)	Montana (10–1)	Montana (11–1)	Appalachian State (11–3)	5.
6.	Richmond	Montana (0–0)	Delaware (0–1)	Delaware (1–1)	McNeese State (1–1)	North Dakota State (2–2)	North Dakota State (3–2)	Wofford (4–1)	Wofford (5–1) (1)	Montana (7–1)	Richmond (6–3)	Richmond (7–3)	Richmond (8–3)	Richmond (9–3)	Villanova (10–3)	6.
7.	Montana	Delaware (0–1) (1)	James Madison (1–1)	Northern Iowa (1–1)	North Dakota State (2–2)	Richmond (3–2)	Cal Poly (3–1)	UMass (4–2)	Elon (7–1)	Richmond (6–3)	New Hampshire (7–1)	Villanova (7–2)	Villanova (8–2)	Villanova (9–2)	New Hampshire (10–3)	7.
8.	Delaware	James Madison (0–1)	Northern Iowa (1–1)	McNeese State (1–1)	New Hampshire (3–0)	Cal Poly (2–1)	Northern Iowa (3–2)	Elon (6–1)	Richmond (5–3)	New Hampshire (6–1)	Villanova (6–2)	Weber State (9–2)	Weber State (9–2)	Southern Illinois (9–2)	Cal Poly (8–3)	8.
9.	Eastern Washington	McNeese State (0–1)	McNeese State (1–1)	UMass (2–1)	Cal Poly (2–1)	Wofford (3–1)	Wofford (3–1)	Richmond (4–3)	Villanova (5–1)	Central Arkansas (7–1)	Southern Illinois (6–2)	Southern Illinois (7–2)	Southern Illinois (8–2)	Wofford (9–2)	Weber State (10–4)	9.
10.	McNeese State	Eastern Washington (0–1)	New Hampshire (1–0)	New Hampshire (2–0)	UMass (2–2)	Northern Iowa (2–2)	Montana (4–1)	Villanova (4–1)	New Hampshire (5–1)	Villanova (5–2)	Weber State (8–2)	Elon (8–2)	Wofford (8–2)	New Hampshire (9–2)	Southern Illinois (9–3)	10.
11.	Southern Illinois	Cal Poly (1–0) (1)	Wofford (2–0)	Cal Poly (1–1)	Wofford (2–1)	Southern Illinois (2–1)	UMass (3–2)	New Hampshire (4–1)	McNeese State (4–2)	Southern Illinois (5–2)	Elon (7–2)	Wofford (7–2)	New Hampshire (8–2)	Central Arkansas (10–2)	Wofford (9–3)	11.
12.	Youngstown State	Southern Illinois (0–0)	Cal Poly (1–1)	Wofford (2–0)	Delaware (1–2)	UMass (2–2)	Elon (5–1)	McNeese State (3–2)	Central Arkansas (6–1)	Elon (7–2)	Wofford (6–2)	New Hampshire (7–2)	Central Arkansas (9–2)	Weber State (9–3)	Central Arkansas (10–2)	12.
13.	Wofford	Wofford (1–0)	Southern Illinois (1–0)	South Dakota State (2–1)	Southern Illinois (1–1)	Eastern Washington (2–2)	Villanova (4–1)	Central Arkansas (5–1)	Southern Illinois (4–2)	Weber State (7–2)	UMass (6–3)	Central Arkansas (8–2)	McNeese State (7–3)	South Carolina State (10–2)	South Carolina State (10–3)	13.
14.	Cal Poly	Youngstown State (0–1)	Eastern Washington (0–2)	Georgia Southern (2–1) т	Elon (3–1)	Delaware (2–2)	Central Arkansas (4–1)	Southern Illinois (3–2)	Western Illinois (5–2)	Western Illinois (5–2)	Central Arkansas (7–2)	McNeese State (6–3)	Elon (8–3)	Harvard (9–1)	Harvard (9–1)	14.
15.	Elon	New Hampshire (0–0)	Georgia Southern (1–1)	Southern Illinois (1–1) т	Central Arkansas (4–0)	Elon (4–1)	Southern Illinois (2–2)	Liberty (6–0)	Northern Arizona (6–1)	UMass (5–3)	McNeese State (5–3)	William & Mary (7–2)	South Carolina State (9–2)	Liberty (10–2)	Liberty (10–2)	15.
16.	New Hampshire	Georgia Southern (0–1)	Western Illinois (1–1)	Central Arkansas (3–0)	Eastern Washington (1–2)	Villanova (3–1)	Liberty (5–0)	North Dakota State (3–3)	UMass (4–3)	McNeese State (4–3)	William & Mary (6–2)	Furman (7–3)	Harvard (8–1)	Colgate (9–2)	Maine (8–5)	16.
17.	Georgia Southern	Western Illinois (0–1)	South Dakota State (1–1)	Eastern Washington (0–2)	Furman (3–1)	Furman (4–1)	Northern Arizona (4–1)	Western Illinois (4–2)	Weber State (6–2)	Liberty (7–1)	Furman (7–3)	South Carolina State (8–2)	Maine (8–3)	McNeese State (7–4)	Colgate (9–3)	17.
18.	Eastern Illinois	Eastern Illinois (0–1)	Elon (1–1)	Elon (2–1)	South Dakota State (2–2)	South Dakota State (3–2)	Jacksonville State (4–1)	Northern Arizona (5–1)	Furman (6–2)	Northern Arizona (6–2)	South Carolina State (7–2)	Tennessee State (8–2)	Tennessee–Martin (8–3)	William & Mary (7–4)	Eastern Kentucky (8–4)	18.
19.	Villanova	Elon (0–1)	Central Arkansas (2–0)	Villanova (1–1)	Villanova (2–1)	Central Arkansas (4–1)	Western Illinois (3–2)	Furman (5–2)	Tennessee State (6–1)	William & Mary (5–2)	Western Illinois (5–3)	Harvard (7–1)	William & Mary (7–3)	Elon (8–4)	Elon (8–4)	19.
20.	South Dakota State	Villanova (0–1)	Eastern Illinois (0–2)	Eastern Illinois (1–2)	Eastern Illinois (2–2)	The Citadel (3–1)	Delaware (2–3)	Weber State (5–2)	Jacksonville State (5–2)	South Carolina State (6–2)	Tennessee–Martin (7–2)	UMass (6–4)	Liberty (9–2)	Jacksonville State (8–3)	William & Mary (7–4)	20.
21.	Eastern Kentucky	South Dakota State (0–1)	Villanova (0–1)	Western Illinois (1–2)	Western Illinois (2–2)	Liberty (4–0)	Furman (4–2)	Tennessee State (5–1)	Liberty (6–1)	Furman (6–3)	Harvard (6–1)	Tennessee–Martin (7–3)	Jacksonville State (8–3)	Maine (8–4)	McNeese State (7–4)	21.
22.	Western Illinois	Eastern Kentucky (0–1)	The Citadel (1–1)	The Citadel (1–1)	Georgia Southern (2–2)	Western Illinois (2–2)	Eastern Washington (2–3)	South Dakota State (3–3)	Hampton (5–1)	Lafayette (6–1)	Tennessee State (7–2)	Liberty (8–2)	Colgate (8–2)	Eastern Kentucky (8–3)	Jacksonville State (8–3)	22.
23.	The Citadel	The Citadel (1–0)	Furman (1–1)	Furman (2–1)	Youngstown State (2–2)	Jacksonville State (3–1)	South Dakota State (3–3)	Jacksonville State (4–2)	William & Mary (4–2)	Tennessee–Martin (7–2)	North Dakota State (5–4)	Maine (7–3)	Furman (7–4)	Prairie View A&M (9–1)	Texas State (8–5)	23.
24.	Harvard	Central Arkansas (1–0)	Youngstown State (0–2)	Youngstown State (1–2)	The Citadel (2–1)	Northern Arizona (3–1)	Tennessee State (5–1)	Hampton (4–1)	South Carolina State (5–2)	North Dakota State (4–4)	Northern Arizona (6–3)	Colgate (8–2)	North Dakota State (6–4)	Tennessee–Martin (8–4)	Grambling State (11–2)	24.
25.	Central Arkansas	Harvard (0–0)	Delaware State (1–0)	Liberty (3–0)	Tennessee State (4–0)	Eastern Illinois (2–3)	The Citadel (3–2)	Georgia Southern (3–3)	North Dakota State (3–4)	Harvard (5–1)	Liberty (7–2)	North Dakota State (5–4)	Tennessee State (8–3)	Grambling State (9–2)	Prairie View A&M (9–1)	25.
	Preseason	Week 1 Sept 2	Week 2 Sept 9	Week 3 Sept 16	Week 4 Sept 23	Week 5 Sept 30	Week 6 Oct 7	Week 7 Oct 14	Week 8 Oct 21	Week 9 Oct 28	Week 10 Nov 4	Week 11 Nov 11	Week 12 Nov 18	Week 13 Nov 25	Week 14 Postseason	
		None	Dropped: 22 Eastern Kentucky; 25 Harvard	Dropped: 25 Delaware State	Dropped: 25 Liberty	Dropped: 22 Georgia Southern; 23 Youngstown State; 25 Tennessee State	Dropped: 25 Eastern Illinois	Dropped: 20 Delaware; 22 Eastern Washington; 25 The Citadel	Dropped: 22 South Dakota State; 25 Georgia Southern	Dropped: 19 Tennessee State; 20 Jacksonville State; 22 Hampton	Dropped: 22 Lafayette	Dropped: 19 Western Illinois; 24 Northern Arizona	Dropped: 20 UMass	Dropped: 23 Furman; 24 North Dakota State; 25 Tennessee State	Dropped: 24 Tennessee–Martin	
