= 2010 Texas Southern Tigers football team =

American college football season

2010 Texas Southern Tigers football

SWAC champion

SWAC Championship Game, W 11–6 (vacated) vs. Alabama State
- Conference: Southwestern Athletic Conference
- West Division
- Record: 0–3, 9 wins vacated (0–1 SWAC, 8 wins vacated)
- Head coach: Johnnie Cole (3rd season)
- Defensive coordinator: Kevin Ramsey (2nd season)
- Home stadium: Reliant Stadium; Delmar Stadium

2010 Southwestern Athletic Conference football standings
	Conf.			Overall
Team	W		L	W		L
East Division
Alabama State xy	6	–	3	7	–	5
Jackson State x	6	–	3	8	–	3
Alcorn State	4	–	5	5	–	6
Alabama A&M	2	–	7	3	–	8
Mississippi Valley State	0	–	9	0	–	10
West Division
Texas Southern xy$	8	–	1	9	–	3
No. 23 Grambling State x	8	–	1	9	–	2
Prairie View A&M	6	–	3	7	–	4
Arkansas–Pine Bluff	4	–	5	5	–	6
Southern	1	–	8	2	–	9
Championship: Texas Southern 11, Alabama State 6
$ – Conference champion; x – Division champion/co-champions; y – Championship game participant; Rankings from The Sports Network Poll

The 2010 Texas Southern Tigers football team represented Texas Southern University as a member of the Southwestern Athletic Conference (SWAC) during the 2010 NCAA Division I FCS football season. Led by third-year head coach Johnnie Cole, the Tigers compiled an overall record of 9–3, with a mark of 8–1 in conference play, and finished as SWAC champion.

In October 2012, the NCAA officially vacated all wins from the 2010 season as part of their penalties for playing ineligible players during the season. This resulted in the vacating of all nine victories and their SWAC championship.

== Schedule ==
Date	Opponent	Site	Result	Attendance	Source
September 5	Prairie View A&M	Reliant Stadium; Houston, TX (Labor Day Classic)	L 14–16	22,062	
September 11	at Connecticut*	Rentschler Field; East Hartford, CT	L 3–62	37,359	
September 18	Alabama A&M	Delmar Stadium; Houston, TX	W 32–9 (vacated)		
September 25	vs. Tuskegee*	Ladd–Peebles Stadium; Mobile, AL	L 14–21		
October 2	at Alabama State	Cramton Bowl; Montgomery, AL	W 21–7 (vacated)		
October 9	at Alcorn State	Jack Spinks Stadium; Lorman, MS	W 30–20 (vacated)		
October 23	Jackson State	Joe K. Butler Stadium; Houston, TX	W 21–18 (vacated)		
October 30	Mississippi Valley State	Delmar Stadium; Houston, TX	W 38–7 (vacated)		
November 6	at Southern	A. W. Mumford Stadium; Baton Rouge, LA	W 54–7 (vacated)		
November 11	No. 20 Grambling State	Delmar Stadium; Houston, TX	W 41–34 ^{OT} (vacated)		
November 20	Arkansas–Pine Bluff	Delmar Stadium; Houston, TX	W 20–13 (vacated)		
December 11	vs. Alabama State	Legion Field; Birmingham, AL (SWAC Championship Game)	W 11–6 (vacated)	22,350	
*Non-conference game; Rankings from The Sports Network Poll released prior to the game
