= 2010 Alabama A&M Bulldogs football team =

American college football season

2010 Alabama A&M Bulldogs football
- Conference: Southwestern Athletic Conference
- Record: 3–8 (2–7 SWAC)
- Head coach: Anthony Jones (9th season)
- Offensive coordinator: Cedric Pearl (4th season)
- Home stadium: Louis Crews Stadium

2010 Southwestern Athletic Conference football standings
	Conf.			Overall
Team	W		L	W		L
East Division
Alabama State xy	6	–	3	7	–	5
Jackson State x	6	–	3	8	–	3
Alcorn State	4	–	5	5	–	6
Alabama A&M	2	–	7	3	–	8
Mississippi Valley State	0	–	9	0	–	10
West Division
Texas Southern xy$	8	–	1	9	–	3
No. 23 Grambling State x	8	–	1	9	–	2
Prairie View A&M	6	–	3	7	–	4
Arkansas–Pine Bluff	4	–	5	5	–	6
Southern	1	–	8	2	–	9
Championship: Texas Southern 11, Alabama State 6
$ – Conference champion; x – Division champion/co-champions; y – Championship game participant; Rankings from The Sports Network Poll

The 2010 Alabama A&M Bulldogs football team represented Alabama A&M University as a member of the Southwestern Athletic Conference (SWAC) during the 2010 NCAA Division I FCS football season. Led by ninth-year head coach Anthony Jones, the Bulldogs compiled an overall record of 3–8 and a mark of 2–7 in conference play, and finished fourth in the SWAC East Division.

== Schedule ==
Date	Opponent	Site	Result	Attendance	Source
September 4	at Tennessee State*	LP Field; Nashville, TN (John Merritt Classic)	L 14–27	22,607	
September 11	Central State*	Louis Crews Stadium; Normal, AL	W 45–0		
September 18	at Texas Southern	Delmar Stadium; Houston, TX	L 9–32		
September 25	Southern	Louis Crews Stadium; Normal, AL	W 34–14		
October 2	Grambling State	Louis Crews Stadium; Normal, AL	L 22–25	12,328	
October 9	at Jackson State	Mississippi Veterans Memorial Stadium; Jackson, MS	W 14–30	24,269	
October 16	at Arkansas–Pine Bluff	Golden Lion Stadium; Pine Bluff, AR	L 14–21		
October 30	vs. Alabama State	Legion Field; Birmingham, AL (Magic City Classic)	L 10–31		
November 6	Alcorn State	Louis Crews Stadium; Normal, AL	L 24–41		
November 13	at Mississippi Valley State	Charles Kerg Field; Greenville, MS	W 21–7		
November 20	Prairie View A&M	Louis Crews Stadium; Normal, AL	L 14–35		
*Non-conference game
