= 2008 Texas Southern Tigers football team =

American college football season

2008 Texas Southern Tigers football
- Conference: Southwestern Athletic Conference
- West Division
- Record: 4–8 (1–6 SWAC)
- Head coach: Johnnie Cole (1st season)
- Defensive coordinator: L. C. Cole (1st season)
- Home stadium: Alexander Durley Sports Complex; Reliant Stadium; Delmar Stadium

2008 Southwestern Athletic Conference football standings
	Conf.			Overall
Team	W		L	W		L
East Division
Jackson State xy	6	–	1	7	–	5
Alabama A&M	4	–	3	5	–	7
Alabama State	2	–	5	3	–	8
Mississippi Valley State	1	–	6	3	–	8
Alcorn State	1	–	6	2	–	10
West Division
Grambling State xy$	7	–	0	11	–	2
Prairie View A&M	6	–	1	9	–	1
Southern	5	–	2	6	–	5
Arkansas–Pine Bluff	2	–	5	3	–	9
Texas Southern	1	–	6	4	–	8
Championship: Grambling State 41, Jackson State 9
$ – Conference champion; x – Division champion/co-champions; y – Championship game participant

The 2008 Texas Southern Tigers football team represented Texas Southern University as a member of the Southwestern Athletic Conference (SWAC) during the 2008 NCAA Division I FCS football season. Led by the first-year head coach Johnnie Cole, the Tigers compiled an overall record of 4–8, with a mark of 1–6 in conference play, and finished fifth in the West Division of the SWAC.

== Schedule ==
Date	Opponent	Site	Result	Attendance	Source
August 30	Prairie View A&M	Reliant Stadium; Houston, TX (Labor Day Classic)	L 14–34		
September 6	at Arkansas State*	ASU Stadium; Jonesboro, AR	L 10–83	21,741	
September 13	vs. Shaw*	Charles C. Hughes Stadium; Sacramento, CA (Capital City Classic)	W 40–29	15,000	
September 20	at Texas College*	Rose Stadium; Tyler, TX	W 28–13		
September 27	Concordia (AL)*	Delmar Stadium; Houston, TX	W 45–27		
October 4	at Texas State*	Bobcat Stadium; San Marcos, TX	L 39–63	11,561	
October 11	at Southern	A. W. Mumford Stadium; Baton Rouge, LA	L 14–45		
October 18	Jackson State	Delmar Stadium; Houston, TX	L 14–30		
October 25	at Alcorn State	Jack Spinks Stadium; Lorman, MS	W 30–29		
November 8	Mississippi Valley State	Alexander Durley Sports Complex; Houston, TX	L 44–58		
November 20	Grambling State	Delmar Stadium; Houston, TX	L 7–33		
November 29	vs. Arkansas–Pine Bluff	Cotton Bowl; Dallas, TX	L 7–28		
*Non-conference game
