= 2008 Jackson State Tigers football team =

American college football season

2008 Jackson State Tigers football

SWAC East Division champion

SWAC Championship Game, L 9–41 vs. Grambling State
- Conference: Southwestern Athletic Conference
- East Division
- Record: 7–5 (6–1 SWAC)
- Head coach: Rick Comegy (3rd season)
- Home stadium: Mississippi Veterans Memorial Stadium

2008 Southwestern Athletic Conference football standings
	Conf.			Overall
Team	W		L	W		L
East Division
Jackson State xy	6	–	1	7	–	5
Alabama A&M	4	–	3	5	–	7
Alabama State	2	–	5	3	–	8
Mississippi Valley State	1	–	6	3	–	8
Alcorn State	1	–	6	2	–	10
West Division
Grambling State xy$	7	–	0	11	–	2
Prairie View A&M	6	–	1	9	–	1
Southern	5	–	2	6	–	5
Arkansas–Pine Bluff	2	–	5	3	–	9
Texas Southern	1	–	6	4	–	8
Championship: Grambling State 41, Jackson State 9
$ – Conference champion; x – Division champion/co-champions; y – Championship game participant

The 2008 Jackson State Tigers football team represented Jackson State University as a member of the Southwestern Athletic Conference (SWAC) during the 2008 NCAA Division I FCS football season. Led by third-year head coach Rick Comegy, the Tigers compiled an overall record of 7–5 and a mark of 6–1 in conference play, and finished as SWAC runner-up after they were defeated by Grambling State in the SWAC Championship Game.

== Schedule ==
Date	Time	Opponent	Site	Result	Attendance	Source
August 31		vs. Hampton*	Florida Citrus Bowl; Orlando, FL (MEAC/SWAC Challenge)	L 13–17	10,723	
September 6		Stillman*	Mississippi Veterans Memorial Stadium; Jackson, MS	W 7–17	7,950	
September 13		vs. Tennessee State*	Liberty Bowl Memorial Stadium; Memphis, TN (Southern Heritage Classic)	L 18–41	50,794	
September 20		at Grambling State	Eddie G. Robinson Memorial Stadium; Grambling, LA	L 5–14	12,702	
October 4		Southern	Mississippi Veterans Memorial Stadium; Jackson, MS (rivalry)	L 28–35	42,513	
October 11		at Arkansas–Pine Bluff	Golden Lion Stadium; Pine Bluff, AR	W 21–10	10,600	
October 18		at Texas Southern	Delmar Stadium; Houston, TX	W 30–14		
October 25		Mississippi Valley State	Mississippi Veterans Memorial Stadium; Jackson, MS	W 29–27		
November 8		at Alabama State	Cramton Bowl; Montgomery, AL	W 20–0		
November 15	3:00 p.m.	Alabama A&M	Mississippi Veterans Memorial Stadium; Jackson, MS	W 37–21	9,046	
November 22		Alcorn State	Mississippi Veterans Memorial Stadium; Jackson, MS (Soul Bowl)	W 26–21	30,005	
December 14		vs. No. 24 Grambling State	Legion Field; Birmingham, AL (SWAC Championship Game)	L 9–41	25,873	
*Non-conference game; Rankings from The Sports Network Poll released prior to the game; All times are in Central time
