= 2010 Grambling State Tigers football team =

American college football season

2010 Grambling State Tigers football

SWAC West Division co-champion
- Conference: Southwestern Athletic Conference
- West Division

Ranking
- Sports Network: No. 23
- Record: 9–2 (8–1 SWAC)
- Head coach: Rod Broadway (4th season)
- Offensive coordinator: Bob Leahy (1st season)
- Offensive scheme: Spread option
- Defensive coordinator: Cliff Yoshida (4th season)
- Base defense: 3–4
- Home stadium: Eddie G. Robinson Memorial Stadium

2010 Southwestern Athletic Conference football standings
	Conf.			Overall
Team	W		L	W		L
East Division
Alabama State xy	6	–	3	7	–	5
Jackson State x	6	–	3	8	–	3
Alcorn State	4	–	5	5	–	6
Alabama A&M	2	–	7	3	–	8
Mississippi Valley State	0	–	9	0	–	10
West Division
Texas Southern xy$	8	–	1	9	–	3
No. 23 Grambling State x	8	–	1	9	–	2
Prairie View A&M	6	–	3	7	–	4
Arkansas–Pine Bluff	4	–	5	5	–	6
Southern	1	–	8	2	–	9
Championship: Texas Southern 11, Alabama State 6
$ – Conference champion; x – Division champion/co-champions; y – Championship game participant; Rankings from The Sports Network Poll

The 2010 Grambling State Tigers football team represented Grambling State University as a member of the Southwestern Athletic Conference (SWAC) during the 2010 NCAA Division I FCS football season. Led by fourth-year head coach Rod Broadway, the Tigers compiled an overall record of 9–2 and a mark of 8–1 in conference play, and finished as co-champion in the SWAC West Division.

== Schedule ==
Date	Opponent	Rank	Site	Result	Attendance	Source
September 4	vs. Louisiana Tech*		Independence Stadium; Shreveport, LA (Port City Classic)	L 6–20	34,762	
September 18	Jackson State		Eddie G. Robinson Memorial Stadium; Grambling, LA	W 28–21	7,057	
September 25	vs. Prairie View A&M		Cotton Bowl; Dallas, TX (rivalry)	W 34–17		
October 2	at Alabama A&M		Louis Crews Stadium; Normal, AL	W 25–22	12,328	
October 9	Alabama State		Eddie G. Robinson Memorial Stadium; Grambling, LA	W 22–7		
October 16	Alcorn State		Eddie G. Robinson Memorial Stadium; Grambling, LA	W 38–28	6,980	
October 23	at Mississippi Valley State		Charles Kerg Field; Greenville, MS	W 35–14	3,197	
October 30	vs. Arkansas–Pine Bluff	No. 23	War Memorial Stadium; Little Rock, AR (Delta Classic)	W 35–25	29,373	
November 6	Concordia (AL)*^{†}	No. 21	Eddie G. Robinson Memorial Stadium; Grambling, LA	W 35–0	14,543	
November 11	at Texas Southern	No. 20	Delmar Stadium; Houston, TX	L 34–41 ^{OT}		
November 27	vs. Southern	No. 23	Louisiana Superdome; New Orleans, LA (Bayou Classic)	W 38–17	43,494	
*Non-conference game; ^{†}Homecoming; Rankings from The Sports Network Poll released prior to the game
