= 2008 Grambling State Tigers football team =

American college football season

2008 Grambling State Tigers football

Black college national champion SWAC champion

SWAC Championship Game, W 41–9 vs. Jackson State
- Conference: Southwestern Athletic Conference
- West Division

Ranking
- Sports Network: No. 24
- FCS Coaches: No. 24
- Record: 11–2 (7–0 SWAC)
- Head coach: Rod Broadway (2nd season)
- Offensive scheme: Spread option
- Defensive coordinator: Cliff Yoshida (2nd season)
- Base defense: 3–4
- Home stadium: Eddie G. Robinson Memorial Stadium

2008 Southwestern Athletic Conference football standings
	Conf.			Overall
Team	W		L	W		L
East Division
Jackson State xy	6	–	1	7	–	5
Alabama A&M	4	–	3	5	–	7
Alabama State	2	–	5	3	–	8
Mississippi Valley State	1	–	6	3	–	8
Alcorn State	1	–	6	2	–	10
West Division
Grambling State xy$	7	–	0	11	–	2
Prairie View A&M	6	–	1	9	–	1
Southern	5	–	2	6	–	5
Arkansas–Pine Bluff	2	–	5	3	–	9
Texas Southern	1	–	6	4	–	8
Championship: Grambling State 41, Jackson State 9
$ – Conference champion; x – Division champion/co-champions; y – Championship game participant

The 2008 Grambling State Tigers football team represented Grambling State University as a member of the Southwestern Athletic Conference (SWAC) during the 2008 NCAA Division I FCS football season. Led by second-year head coach Rod Broadway, the Tigers compiled an overall record of 11–2 and a mark of 7–0 in conference play, and finished as both SWAC and black college national champion.

== Schedule ==
Date	Time	Opponent	Rank	Site	Result	Attendance	Source
August 30		at Nevada*		Mackay Stadium; Reno, NV	L 13–49	22,772	
September 6		Alcorn State		Eddie G. Robinson Memorial Stadium; Grambling, LA	W 29–0		
September 13	2:00 pm	at Northwestern State*		Harry Turpin Stadium; Natchitoches, LA	L 19–31	8,752	
September 20		Jackson State		Eddie G. Robinson Memorial Stadium; Grambling, LA	W 14–5	12,702	
September 27		Langston*		Eddie G. Robinson Memorial Stadium; Grambling, LA	W 13–2	5,121	
October 4		vs. Prairie View A&M		Cotton Bowl; Dallas, TX (rivalry)	W 40–16	54,315	
October 11	3:00 p.m.	at Alabama A&M		Louis Crews Stadium; Normal, AL	W 27–9	15,170	
October 18		Alabama State		Eddie G. Robinson Memorial Stadium; Grambling, LA	W 27–7	16,974	
November 1		at Mississippi Valley State		Rice–Totten Field; Itta Bena, MS	W 35–14		
November 8		vs. Arkansas–Pine Bluff		War Memorial Stadium; Little Rock, AR (Delta Classic)	W 28–7	15,500	
November 20		at Texas Southern		Delmar Stadium; Houston, TX	W 33–7		
November 29		vs. Southern		Louisiana Superdome; New Orleans, LA (Bayou Classic)	W 29–14	59,874	
December 14		vs. Jackson State	No. 24	Legion Field; Birmingham, AL (SWAC Championship Game)	W 41–9	25,873	
*Non-conference game; Rankings from The Sports Network Poll released prior to the game
