= 2010 Mississippi Valley State Delta Devils football team =

American college football season

2010 Mississippi Valley State Delta Devils football
- Conference: Southwestern Athletic Conference
- East Division
- Record: 0–10 (0–9 SWAC)
- Head coach: Karl Morgan (1st season)
- Offensive coordinator: Ramon Flanigan (1st season)
- Home stadium: Charles Kerg Field

2010 Southwestern Athletic Conference football standings
	Conf.			Overall
Team	W		L	W		L
East Division
Alabama State xy	6	–	3	7	–	5
Jackson State x	6	–	3	8	–	3
Alcorn State	4	–	5	5	–	6
Alabama A&M	2	–	7	3	–	8
Mississippi Valley State	0	–	9	0	–	10
West Division
Texas Southern xy$	8	–	1	9	–	3
No. 23 Grambling State x	8	–	1	9	–	2
Prairie View A&M	6	–	3	7	–	4
Arkansas–Pine Bluff	4	–	5	5	–	6
Southern	1	–	8	2	–	9
Championship: Texas Southern 11, Alabama State 6
$ – Conference champion; x – Division champion/co-champions; y – Championship game participant; Rankings from The Sports Network Poll

The 2010 Mississippi Valley State Delta Devils football team represented Mississippi Valley State University as a member of the Southwestern Athletic Conference (SWAC) during the 2010 NCAA Division I FCS football season. Led by first-year head coach Karl Morgan, the Delta Devils compiled an overall record of 0–10 and a mark of 0–9 in conference play, and finished last in the SWAC East Division.

For their 2010 season, the Delta Devils played their home games at Charles Kerg Field in Greenville, Mississippi after Rice–Totten Stadium was deemed unsafe to play in due to structural damage.

== Schedule ==
Date	Opponent	Site	Result	Attendance	Source
September 4	at Alabama State	Cramton Bowl; Montgomery, AL	L 6–34		
September 11	at No. 15 South Carolina State*	Oliver C. Dawson Stadium; Orangeburg, SC	L 0–44	12,224	
September 18	vs. Alcorn State	Soldier Field; Chicago, IL (Chicago Football Classic)	L 9–27		
September 25	at Jackson State	Mississippi Veterans Memorial Stadium; Jackson, MS	L 7–43	18,020	
October 2	Prairie View A&M	Charles Kerg Field; Greenville, MS	L 13–34		
October 9	at Southern	A. W. Mumford Stadium; Baton Rouge, LA	L 20–38		
October 23	Grambling State	Charles Kerg Field; Greenville, MS	L 14–35	3,197	
October 30	at Texas Southern	Delmar Stadium; Houston, TX	L 7–38		
November 6	at Arkansas–Pine Bluff	Golden Lion Stadium; Pine Bluff, AR	L 20–49		
November 13	Alabama A&M	Charles Kerg Field; Greenville, MS	L 7–21		
*Non-conference game; Rankings from The Sports Network Poll released prior to the game
