= Karl Morgan =

American football player and coach (born 1961)

Biographical details
- Born: February 23, 1961 (age 65); Houma, Louisiana, U.S.
- Education: Vandebilt Catholic (LA); University of California, Los Angeles

Playing career
- 1979–1982: UCLA
- 1983: Saskatchewan Roughriders
- 1984–1986: Tampa Bay Buccaneers
- 1986: Houston Oilers
- 1992: Cincinnati Rockers
- Position: Nose tackle

Coaching career (HC unless noted)
- 1989–1992: Central Catholic HS (LA)
- 1993–1994: Nicholls State (DL)
- 1995: Southern (DL)
- 1996: Purdue (DL)
- 1997–2000: Arkansas State (DL)
- 2001: Alcorn State (DC)
- 2002–2004: Hampton (DC)
- 2005–2009: North Alabama (DC)
- 2010–2013: Mississippi Valley State
- 2014–2015: Coahoma

Head coaching record
- Overall: 8–35 (college)

Accomplishments and honors

Awards
- Second-team All-American (1982); First-team All-Pac-10 (1982); Second-team All-Pac-10 (1981)

Karl Morgan (born February 23, 1961) is an American football coach and former player. He is the former head football coach at Mississippi Valley State University (MVSU) from 2010 to 2013 and Coahoma Community College in Coahoma County, Mississippi from 2014 to 2015.

== Playing career ==
Morgan is an alumnus of the University of California, Los Angeles (UCLA) where he played as a defensive lineman for the Bruins from 1979 to 1982, garnering All-Pac-10 Conference honors following his senior year. His professional playing career started in 1983 with the Saskatchewan Roughriders in the Canadian Football League (CFL) where he was on the CFL's All-Rookie team. The next year, he signed with the Tampa Bay Buccaneers of the National Football League (NFL) and played for them from 1984 to 1986. He also played for the Houston Oilers during the 1986 season. Morgan came out of retirement in 1992 to play for the Arena Football League's (AFL) Cincinnati Rockers.

== Coaching career ==
=== High school career ===
Morgan began his coaching career as the head football coach at Central Catholic High School in Morgan City, Louisiana from 1989 to 1992.

=== College career ===
Morgan entered the college ranks as a defensive line coach at Nicholls State University from 1993 to 1994. Subsequently, Morgan held the same position at Southern University in 1995, Purdue University in 1996 and Arkansas State University from 1997 to 2000. Morgan was hired for his first coordinator position as defensive coordinator at Alcorn State University in 2001, Hampton University from 2002 to 2004 and the University of North Alabama from 2005 to 2009.

Morgan was head football coach at Mississippi Valley State University from 2010 to 2013, compiling a record of 8 wins and 35 losses. In 2014, he accepted the head coaching position at Coahoma Community College and remained head coach through 2015.

== Head coaching record ==
=== College ===
Year	Team	Overall	Conference	Standing	Bowl/playoffs
Mississippi Valley State Delta Devils (Southwestern Athletic Conference) (2010–2013)
2010	Mississippi Valley State	0–10	0–9	5th (East)	
2011	Mississippi Valley State	1–10	1–8	T–4th (East)	
2012	Mississippi Valley State	5–6	5–4	4th (East)	
2013	Mississippi Valley State	2–9	2–7	5th (East)	
Mississippi Valley State:		8–35	8–28		
Total:		8–35			
