= 2010 Southern Jaguars football team =

American college football season

2010 Southern Jaguars football
- Conference: Southwestern Athletic Conference
- West Division
- Record: 0–9 (0–8 SWAC)
- Head coach: Stump Mitchell (1st season)
- Home stadium: A. W. Mumford Stadium

2010 Southwestern Athletic Conference football standings
	Conf.			Overall
Team	W		L	W		L
East Division
Alabama State xy	6	–	3	7	–	5
Jackson State x	6	–	3	8	–	3
Alcorn State	4	–	5	5	–	6
Alabama A&M	2	–	7	3	–	8
Mississippi Valley State	0	–	9	0	–	10
West Division
Texas Southern xy$	8	–	1	9	–	3
No. 23 Grambling State x	8	–	1	9	–	2
Prairie View A&M	6	–	3	7	–	4
Arkansas–Pine Bluff	4	–	5	5	–	6
Southern	1	–	8	2	–	9
Championship: Texas Southern 11, Alabama State 6
$ – Conference champion; x – Division champion/co-champions; y – Championship game participant; Rankings from The Sports Network Poll

The 2010 Southern Jaguars football team represented Southern University as a member of the Southwestern Athletic Conference (SWAC) during the 2010 NCAA Division I FCS football season. Led by first-year head coach Stump Mitchell, the Jaguars compiled an overall record of 2–9, with a conference record of 1–8, and finished and finished fifth in the SWAC West Division. The Jaguars subsequently had all wins from this season vacated as a penalty for NCAA violations.

== Schedule ==
Date	Opponent	Site	Result	Attendance	Source
September 5	vs. Delaware State*	Florida Citrus Bowl; Orlando, FL (MEAC/SWAC Challenge)	W 37–27 (vacated)	16,367	
September 11	Arkansas–Monticello*	A. W. Mumford Stadium; Baton Rouge, LA	L 7–31		
September 25	at Alabama A&M	Louis Crews Stadium; Normal, AL	L 14–34		
October 2	Arkansas–Pine Bluff	A. W. Mumford Stadium; Baton Rouge, LA	L 23–41		
October 9	Mississippi Valley State	A. W. Mumford Stadium; Baton Rouge, LA	W 38–20 (vacated)		
October 16	at Jackson State	Mississippi Veterans Memorial Stadium; Jackson, MS (rivalry)	L 45–49		
October 23	vs. Prairie View A&M	Independence Stadium; Shreveport, LA (Shreveport Classic)	L 16–30	19,979	
October 30	at Alcorn State	Jack Spinks Stadium; Lorman, MS	L 20–27		
November 6	Texas Southern	A. W. Mumford Stadium; Baton Rouge, LA	L 7–54		
November 13	Alabama State	A. W. Mumford Stadium; Baton Rouge, LA	L 19–21		
November 27	vs. No. 23 Grambling State	Louisiana Superdome; New Orleans, LA (Bayou Classic)	L 17–38	43,494	
*Non-conference game; Rankings from The Sports Network Poll released prior to the game
