= 2008 Alabama A&M Bulldogs football team =

American college football season

2008 Alabama A&M Bulldogs football
- Conference: Southwestern Athletic Conference
- Record: 5–7 (4–3 SWAC)
- Head coach: Anthony Jones (7th season)
- Offensive coordinator: Cedric Pearl (2nd season)
- Home stadium: Louis Crews Stadium

2008 Southwestern Athletic Conference football standings
| | Conf. | | | Overall |
| Team | W | | L | W | | L |
|---|---|---|---|---|---|---|
East Division
| Jackson State xy | 6 | – | 1 | 7 | – | 5 |
| Alabama A&M | 4 | – | 3 | 5 | – | 7 |
| Alabama State | 2 | – | 5 | 3 | – | 8 |
| Mississippi Valley State | 1 | – | 6 | 3 | – | 8 |
| Alcorn State | 1 | – | 6 | 2 | – | 10 |
West Division
| Grambling State xy$ | 7 | – | 0 | 11 | – | 2 |
| Prairie View A&M | 6 | – | 1 | 9 | – | 1 |
| Southern | 5 | – | 2 | 6 | – | 5 |
| Arkansas–Pine Bluff | 2 | – | 5 | 3 | – | 9 |
| Texas Southern | 1 | – | 6 | 4 | – | 8 |
Championship: Grambling State 41, Jackson State 9
$ – Conference champion; x – Division champion/co-champions; y – Championship game participant

The 2008 Alabama A&M Bulldogs football team represented Alabama A&M University as a member of the Southwestern Athletic Conference (SWAC) during the 2008 NCAA Division I FCS football season. Led by seventh-year head coach Anthony Jones, the Bulldogs compiled an overall record of 5–7 and a mark of 4–3 in conference play, and finished second in the SWAC East Division.

== Schedule ==
| Date | Time | Opponent | Site | Result | Attendance | Source |
|---|---|---|---|---|---|---|
| August 30 | 6:00 p.m. | Tennessee State* | Louis Crews Stadium; Normal, AL | L 13–34 | 10,072 | |
| September 6 | 6:00 p.m. | at Jacksonville State* | Paul Snow Stadium; Jacksonville, AL | L 18–45 | 16,654 | |
| September 12 | 7:30 p.m. | at Louisiana–Monroe* | Malone Stadium; Monroe, LA | L 15–37 | 9,717 | |
| September 20 | 6:00 p.m. | Central State* | Louis Crews Stadium; Normal, AL | W 37–17 | 3,256 | |
| September 27 | 6:00 p.m. | at Arkansas–Pine Bluff | Golden Lion Stadium; Pine Bluff, AR | W 23–17 | 8,513 | |
| October 4 | 4:00 p.m. | vs. Tuskegee* | Lucas Oil Stadium; Indianapolis, IN (Circle City Classic) | L 24–34 | 47,273 | |
| October 11 | 3:00 p.m. | Grambling State | Louis Crews Stadium; Normal, AL | L 9–27 | 15,170 | |
| October 18 | 6:00 p.m. | Alcorn State | Louis Crews Stadium; Normal, AL | W 20–13 | 2,917 | |
| October 25 | 2:30 p.m. | vs. Alabama State | Legion Field; Birmingham, AL (Magic City Classic) | W 17–16 | 69,113 | |
| November 8 | 1:00 p.m. | Prairie View A&M | Louis Crews Stadium; Normal, AL | L 10–24 | 3,810 | |
| November 15 | 3:00 p.m. | at Jackson State | Mississippi Veterans Memorial Stadium; Jackson, MS | L 21–37 | 9,046 | |
| November 22 | 1:00 p.m. | at Mississippi Valley State | Rice–Totten Stadium; Itta Bena, MS | W 58–23 | 789 | |
*Non-conference game; All times are in Central time
