= 2008 Norfolk State Spartans football team =

American college football season

2008 Norfolk State Spartans football
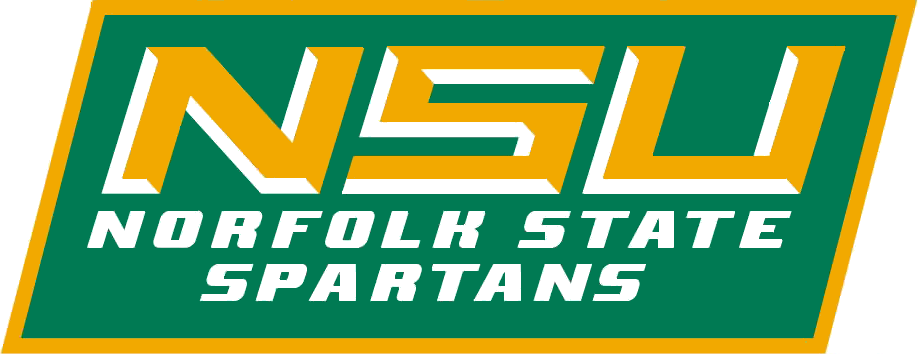
- Conference: Mid-Eastern Athletic Conference
- Record: 5–7 (3–5 MEAC)
- Head coach: Pete Adrian (4th season)
- Home stadium: William "Dick" Price Stadium

2008 Mid-Eastern Athletic Conference football standings
	Conf.			Overall
Team	W		L	W		L
No. 13 South Carolina State $^	8	–	0	10	–	2
Florida A&M	5	–	3	9	–	3
Bethune–Cookman	5	–	3	8	–	3
Hampton	5	–	3	6	–	5
Delaware State	5	–	3	5	–	6
Morgan State	4	–	4	6	–	6
Norfolk State	3	–	5	5	–	7
North Carolina A&T	1	–	7	3	–	9
Howard	0	–	8	1	–	10
Winston-Salem State *	0	–	0	3	–	8
$ – Conference champion; ^ – FCS playoff participant; * – Ineligible for conference championship; Rankings from The Sports Network poll

The 2008 Norfolk State Spartans football team represented Norfolk State University in the 2008 NCAA Division I FCS football season. The Spartans were led by fourth-year head coach Pete Adrian and played their home games at William "Dick" Price Stadium. They were a member of the Mid-Eastern Athletic Conference. They finished the season 5–7, 3–5 in MEAC play.

== Schedule ==
Date	Time	Opponent	Site	TV	Result	Attendance	Source
August 30	6:00 pm	Virginia State*	William "Dick" Price Stadium; Norfolk, VA		W 47–7	17,132	
September 6	6:00 pm	at Kentucky*	Commonwealth Stadium; Lexington, KY	ESPN360	L 3–38	69,118	
September 13	4:00 pm	North Carolina A&T	William "Dick" Price Stadium; Norfolk, VA	ESPNU	W 27–21	12,632	
September 20	7:00 pm	at William & Mary*	Zable Stadium; Williamsburg, VA		L 12–42	10,152	
September 27	4:00 pm	at Bethune–Cookman	Municipal Stadium; Daytona Beach, FL		L 17–33	5,228	
October 11	1:30 pm	at South Carolina State	Oliver C. Dawson Stadium; Orangeburg, SC		L 23–24	16,003	
October 18	1:00 pm	at No. 25 Hampton	Armstrong Stadium; Hampton, VA (rivalry)		L 17–35	12,034	
October 25	1:00 pm	Florida A&M^{†}	William "Dick" Price Stadium; Norfolk, VA		L 28–31	13,889	
November 1	1:00 pm	at Howard	William H. Greene Stadium; Washington, DC		W 49–12	2,086	
November 8	1:00 pm	Morgan State	William "Dick" Price Stadium; Norfolk, VA		W 35–9	5,812	
November 15	1:00 pm	Delaware State	William "Dick" Price Stadium; Norfolk, VA	ESPNU	L 28–34	3,758	
November 22	1:30 pm	at Winston-Salem State	Bowman Gray Stadium; Winston-Salem, NC		W 17–14	1,428	
*Non-conference game; ^{†}Homecoming; Rankings from The Sports Network Poll released prior to the game; All times are in Eastern time
