= 2008 Alabama State Hornets football team =

American college football season

2008 Alabama State Hornets football
- Conference: Southwestern Athletic Conference
- East Division
- Record: 3–8 (2–5 SWAC)
- Head coach: Reggie Barlow (2nd season)
- Home stadium: Cramton Bowl

2008 Southwestern Athletic Conference football standings
	Conf.			Overall
Team	W		L	W		L
East Division
Jackson State xy	6	–	1	7	–	5
Alabama A&M	4	–	3	5	–	7
Alabama State	2	–	5	3	–	8
Mississippi Valley State	1	–	6	3	–	8
Alcorn State	1	–	6	2	–	10
West Division
Grambling State xy$	7	–	0	11	–	2
Prairie View A&M	6	–	1	9	–	1
Southern	5	–	2	6	–	5
Arkansas–Pine Bluff	2	–	5	3	–	9
Texas Southern	1	–	6	4	–	8
Championship: Grambling State 41, Jackson State 9
$ – Conference champion; x – Division champion/co-champions; y – Championship game participant

The 2008 Alabama State Hornets football team represented Alabama State University as a member of the Southwestern Athletic Conference (SWAC) during the 2008 NCAA Division I FCS football season. Led by second-year head coach Reggie Barlow, the Hornets compiled an overall record of 3–8, with a mark of 2–5 in conference play, and finished third in the SWAC East Division.

== Schedule ==
Date	Time	Opponent	Site	Result	Attendance	Source
August 30		at Florida A&M*	Bragg Memorial Stadium; Tallahassee, FL	L 20–30	18,088	
September 6		at Bethune–Cookman*	Daytona Stadium; Daytona Beach, FL	L 7–28		
September 20		at UAB*	Legion Field; Birmingham, AL	L 10–45	26,414	
September 25		Mississippi Valley State	Cramton Bowl; Montgomery, AL	W 47–7		
October 11		at Prairie View A&M	Edward L. Blackshear Field; Prairie View, TX	L 6–27		
October 18		at Grambling State	Eddie G. Robinson Memorial Stadium; Grambling, LA	L 7–27	16,974	
October 25	2:30 p.m.	vs. Alabama A&M	Legion Field; Birmingham, AL (Magic City Classic)	L 16–17	69,113	
November 1		at Alcorn State	Jack Spinks Stadium; Lorman, MS	W 24–17		
November 8		Jackson State	Cramton Bowl; Montgomery, AL	L 0–20		
November 15		vs. Southern	Ladd–Peebles Stadium; Mobile, AL (Gulf Coast Classic)	L 0–15	25,387	
November 27		Tuskegee*	Cramton Bowl; Montgomery, AL (Turkey Day Classic)	W 17–13		
*Non-conference game; All times are in Central time
