= 2010 Alcorn State Braves football team =

American college football season

2010 Alcorn State Braves football
- Conference: Southwestern Athletic Conference
- East Division
- Record: 5–6 (4–5 SWAC)
- Head coach: Earnest Collins Jr. (2nd season)
- Home stadium: Jack Spinks Stadium

2010 Southwestern Athletic Conference football standings
	Conf.			Overall
Team	W		L	W		L
East Division
Alabama State xy	6	–	3	7	–	5
Jackson State x	6	–	3	8	–	3
Alcorn State	4	–	5	5	–	6
Alabama A&M	2	–	7	3	–	8
Mississippi Valley State	0	–	9	0	–	10
West Division
Texas Southern xy$	8	–	1	9	–	3
No. 23 Grambling State x	8	–	1	9	–	2
Prairie View A&M	6	–	3	7	–	4
Arkansas–Pine Bluff	4	–	5	5	–	6
Southern	1	–	8	2	–	9
Championship: Texas Southern 11, Alabama State 6
$ – Conference champion; x – Division champion/co-champions; y – Championship game participant; Rankings from The Sports Network Poll

The 2010 Alcorn State Braves football team represented Alcorn State University as a member of the Southwestern Athletic Conference (SWAC) during the 2010 NCAA Division I FCS football season. Led by second-year head coach Earnest Collins Jr., the Braves compiled an overall record of 5–6, with a conference record of 4–5, and finished third in the SWAC East Division.

== Schedule ==
Date	Opponent	Site	Result	Attendance	Source
September 4	Langston*	Jack Spinks Stadium; Lorman, MS	W 50–27		
September 18	vs. Mississippi Valley State	Soldier Field; Chicago, IL (Chicago Football Classic)	W 27–9		
September 25	Alabama State	Jack Spinks Stadium; Lorman, MS	W 41–21		
October 2	at Mississippi State*	Davis Wade Stadium; Starkville, MS	L 16–49	50,439	
October 9	Texas Southern	Jack Spinks Stadium; Lorman, MS	L 20–30		
October 16	at Grambling State	Eddie G. Robinson Memorial Stadium; Grambling, LA	L 28–38	6,980	
October 21	Arkansas–Pine Bluff	Jack Spinks Stadium; Lorman, MS	L 35–39		
October 30	Southern	Jack Spinks Stadium; Lorman, MS	W 27–20		
November 6	at Alabama A&M	Louis Crews Stadium; Normal, AL	W 41–24		
November 13	at Prairie View A&M	Edward L. Blackshear Field; Prairie View, TX	L 27–35		
November 20	at Jackson State	Mississippi Veterans Memorial Stadium; Jackson, MS (Capital City Classic)	L 14–27		
*Non-conference game
