= Lee Fobbs =

American football player (1950–2026)

Profile
- Position: Running back

Personal information
- Born: May 1, 1950; Monroe, Louisiana, U.S.
- Died: January 24, 2026 (aged 75)
- Listed height: 6 ft 3 in (1.91 m)
- Listed weight: 200 lb (91 kg)

Career information
- College: Grambling
- NFL draft: 1973: 8th round, 190th overall pick

Career history

Playing
- 1973: Ottawa Rough Riders
- 1973: Winnipeg Blue Bombers
- 1974: Detroit Wheels

Coaching
- 1989–1990: Northeast Louisiana (DL)
- 1991–1993: Tulane (WR)
- 1994: Tulane (DE)
- 1995: Southern (OT)
- 1996: Minnesota (OLB)
- 1997–1999: Baylor (DT/RB)
- 2000–2002: Alabama (DT/RB)
- 2003–2005: Texas A&M (RB)
- 2006–2008: North Carolina A&T (HC)
- 2009–2010: Kansas (DPP)
- 2015–2018: Grambling (RB)

Awards and highlights
- Grey Cup champion (1973)

LeAndrew "Lee" Fobbs Jr. (May 1, 1950 – January 24, 2026) was an American football player and coach. Fobbs played professionally for the Ottawa Rough Riders and Winnipeg Blue Bombers of the Canadian Football League (CFL) and the Detroit Wheels of the World Football League (WFL). He played college football for the Grambling State Tigers and was selected by the Buffalo Bills of the National Football League (NFL) in the eighth round of the 1973 NFL draft, but did not play in the league. Fobbs served as the head coach for the North Carolina A&T Aggies from 2006 until midway through the 2008 season, compiling a record of 2–28.

Fobbs was an assistant coach for the LSU Tigers in 1994. He died on January 24, 2026, at the age of 75.

== Head coaching record ==
Year	Coach	Overall	Conference	Standing	Bowl/playoffs
North Carolina A&T Aggies (Mid-Eastern Athletic Conference) (2006–2008)
2006	North Carolina A&T	0–11	0–8	9th	
2007	North Carolina A&T	0–11	0–8	9th	
2008	North Carolina A&T	2–6 (Note: Fobbs served as North Carolina A&T's head coach for the first eight games of the 2008 season before he was fired. George Ragsdale was appointed interim head coach and led the Aggies for the remainder of the season. North Carolina A&T finished the season with an overall record of 3–9 and a mark of 1–7 in conference play.)	0–4		
North Carolina A&T:		2–28	0–20		
Total:		2–28			
