= 2008 Savannah State Tigers football team =

American college football season

2008 Savannah State Tigers football
- Conference: Independent
- Record: 5–7
- Head coach: Robby Wells (1st season)
- Offensive coordinator: Eddie Johnson (1st season)
- Offensive scheme: Smashmouth
- Defensive coordinator: Julius Dixon (3rd season)
- Base defense: 4–4
- Home stadium: Ted Wright Stadium

2008 NCAA Division I FCS independents football standings
	Conf.			Overall
Team	W		L	W		L
Bryant		–		7	–	4
Savannah State		–		5	–	7
Marist		–		4	–	7
North Carolina Central		–		4	–	7
Iona		–		3	–	8

The 2008 Savannah State Tigers football team competed in college football on behalf of the Savannah State University. The Tigers competed an independent as the NCAA Division I Football Championship Subdivision level. This was the first season under the guidance of head coach Robby Wells.

The Tigers entered the 2008 season seeking its first winning season since joining Division I-AA in 2000, but compiled a 5–7 record. The season did mark the most wins since 1999, when the Tigers finished with a 5–6 as a member of the NCAA Division II. The Tigers last winning season was in 1998.

== Schedule ==
Date	Time	Opponent	Site	Result	Attendance	Source
August 30	7:00 p.m.	Jacksonville*	Memorial Stadium; Savannah, GA	L 7–20	4,441	
September 6	12:00 p.m.	Livingstone*	Ted Wright Stadium; Savannah, GA (Joe Turner Classic)	W 45–10	2,157	
September 13	6:00 p.m.	at Winston-Salem State*	Bowman Gray Stadium; Winston-Salem, NC	W 16–13	5,112	
September 20	4:00 p.m.	Bethune–Cookman*	Municipal Stadium; Daytona Beach, FL	L 9–34	4,131	
September 27	6:45 p.m.	vs. Howard*	Nathaniel Traz Powell Stadium; Westview, FL (Miami Classic)	L 21–49	3,926	
October 4	1:30 p.m.	at Clark Atlanta*	Panther Stadium; Atlanta, GA	W 17–14	17,893	
October 11	2:00 p.m.	Charleston Southern*	Memorial Stadium; Savannah, GA	L 20–29	3,457	
October 18	1:00 p.m.	at Mississippi Valley State*	Rice–Totten Stadium; Itta Bena, MS	L 20–22	3,457	
November 1	2:00 p.m.	Concordia (AL)*^{†}	Ted Wright Stadium; Savannah, GA	W 23–7	9,217	
November 8	5:00 p.m.	vs. Edward Waters*	Chris Gilman Stadium; Kingsland, GA (Ralph Bunch Classic)	L 21–26	3,117	
November 15	1:00 p.m.	at Webber International*	Legion Field; Babson Park, FL	W 24–7	1,065	
November 22	1:00 p.m.	at North Carolina Central*	O'Kelly–Riddick Stadium; Durham, NC	L 7–10	4,027	
*Non-conference game; ^{†}Homecoming; All times are in Eastern time

== Game summaries ==
=== Jacksonville ===
	1	2	3	4	Total
Jacksonville University	0	0	17	3	20
Savannah State	0	0	0	7	7

Savannah State lost its season opener against Jacksonville, 20–7. The Tigers put up 226 yards of total offense. QB JaCorey Kilcrease was 4–18 with an interception and 28 yards passing. QB Kurvin Curry, who took over in the second half, was 6–9 for 73 yards and tossed a touchdown to Tyron Kirkland. Senior free safety Javorris Jackson made a game-high 10 tackles and intercepted a pass in the second quarter. Senior cornerback Marcus Darrisaw and sophomore linebacker Vince Cochran each recovered fumbles. Junior linebacker Willie Hall forced a fumble.

Eleven SSU players were declared ineligible to play because of NCAA Clearinghouse issues. Calvin Leonard and Frank Usher were both injured during the game. Leonard was the starter at middle linebacker while Leonard was the starter at weakside linebacker.

=== Livingstone ===
Joe Turner Classic

	1	2	3	4	Total
Livingstone College	0	0	10	0	10
Savannah State	13	29	0	3	45

Savannah State defeated Livingstone College 45–10, giving the team their first win of the season and ending a 9-game losing streak dating back to last season. The win was the first for first year Head Coach Robbie Wells.

Savannah State had 29 first downs and 485 yards of total offense. The Tigers had 217 yards passing and 268 rushing. QB Kurvin Curry had a total of 326 yards with four touchdowns and was 10–23 passing for 217 yards and 2 touchdowns. He rushed for 109 yards and two scores. The Tigers first drive resulted in a 33-yard touchdown run by Curry. Justin Babb caught 3 passes for 114 yards and two touchdowns. He also rushed for 71 yards.

Jeff Robertson had 9 total tackles including a sack. Malik Allah recorded a sack and freshman Rashard Russell blocked a Livingstone punt and returned it for a touchdown in the 1st quarter.

Wide receiver Deleon Hollinger was reinstated prior to the game after being suspended for an undisclosed violation of team rules during the Tigers' season-opening loss. Hollinger was SSU's leading receiver during the 2007 season. Antonio Lenton, Quincy Watie, Thelmore Jackson, Keon Hayward, Patrick Thomas and Javares Taylor were cleared by the NCAA Clearinghouse to play in the game after missing the season opener.

=== Winston-Salem State ===
	1	2	3	4	Total
Savannah State	0	6	10	0	16
Winston-Salem	0	7	6	0	13

Kurvin Curry threw for 154 yards and passed for two touchdowns to help Savannah State beat Winston-Salem State University. The victory was SSU's first over an NCAA Football Championship Subdivision team and first road win since 2004.

=== Bethune–Cookman ===
	1	2	3	4	Total
Savannah State	0	3	0	6	9
Bethune-Cookman	7	7	13	7	34

Bethune-Cookman University ended the Tigers' two-game winning streak with a 34–9 victory. B-CU limited the Tigers to 43 yards rushing (24 carries) and 210 total yards on office. The Tigers scored just three points despite four trips to the red zone. SSU scored their only touchdown on a fumble recovery returned for a 33-yard touchdown by Willie Hall in the fourth quarter. QB Kurvin Curry completed 11 of his 22 passes for 167 yards and had one interception. Bethune-Cookman has won nine straight against the Tigers.

=== Howard ===
Miami Classic

	1	2	3	4	Total
Savannah State	7	14	0	0	21
Howard	12	17	14	6	49

Kurvin Curry threw for 126 yards (11-of-28 with a touchdown and an interception) and ran for 77 yards as the Tigers were defeated by Howard University in the 2008 Miami Classic.

=== Clark Atlanta ===
	1	2	3	4	Total
Savannah State	0	8	6	3	17
Clark Atlanta	3	8	3	0	14

Derek Williams made three field goals as Savannah State defeated Division II Clark Atlanta University, 17–14. QB Kurvin Curry threw for 220 yards and a 33-yard touchdown in the second quarter. He also ran for 81 yards as the Tigers improved to 3–3 on the season. Deleon Hollinger caught seven passes for 132 yards. Senior free safety Javorris Jackson made an interception and blocked a field goal attempt by Clark Atlanta in the fourth quarter.

The Tigers overcame an 11–0 lead by the Panthers to tie the game at 11–11 in the third quarter. Clark Atlanta regained a three points lead in the third quarter, but Williams made two field goals in the fourth quarter to seal the victory for the Tigers.

=== Charleston Southern ===
	1	2	3	4	Total
Charleston Southern	6	20	0	3	29
Savannah State	7	7	0	6	20

Charleston Southern University committed five turnovers, but held off the Tigers for a 29–20 victory. SSU QB Kurvin Curry ran to CSU's 11-yard line in the fourth quarter, but fumbled the ball with 1 minute, 56 seconds remaining.

SSU kept the game close at several points. SSU running back Justin Babb, on second-and-goal from the CSU 1-yard line, was tackled for a 2-yard loss as time expired in the first half. That gave the Buccaneers a 26–14 halftime lead. Curry threw a touchdown pass to Deleon Hollinger with 13 minutes, 14 seconds to play and cut the score to 26–20, but kicker Luis Justiniano's missed extra point.

Curry was 17-of-29 passing (181 yards, 3 touchdowns, 2 interceptions and 2 sacks) and ran for 35 of SSU's 71 yards. Curry also threw a 15-yard touchdown to Isaiah Osborne in the first quarter. Hollinger had eight catches for 122 yards and 2 touchdowns.

The SSU defense intercepted three passes, the most since the Tigers intercepted three passes against South Carolina State University on Sept. 20, 2003. Sophomore cornerback Jamar Graham intercepted two of the three while cornerback Marcus Darrisaw and defensive end LaDarien Redfield each forced fumbles that were recovered by Redfield and defensive back Chris Asbury. Senior linebacker Calvin Leonard and junior linebacker Antwan Allen made 11 tackles each for the game high.

CSU moved to 3–3 on the season and improved to 5–0 all time against SSU . The Tigers fell to 3–4 as they lost their first game at home this season.

=== Mississippi Valley State ===
	1	2	3	4	Total
Savannah State	3	10	0	7	20
Mississippi Valley	9	0	0	13	22

Mississippi Valley State University's QB Paul Roberts threw a game-winning touchdown (one of three) with five seconds left in the game as the Delta Devils came from behind to beat Savannah State 22–20 and salvage their homecoming celebration.

The Delta Devils held a 9–3 lead at the end of the first quarter, but the Tigers went back on top, 13–9, at halftime. The Tigers took a 20–16 lead with 36 seconds to play in the fourth quarter before Mississippi Valley State scored the final touchdown for the victory.

SSU QB Kurvin Curry passed for 173 yards and one touchdown. He rushed for 79 yards.

The Delta Devils moved to 2–4 on the season while the Tigers fell to 3–5.

=== Concordia (AL) ===
	1	2	3	4	Total
Concordia	0	0	7	0	7
Savannah State	3	3	0	17	23

A 2008 Homecoming crowd of 9,217 at T.A. Wright Stadium watched as the Tigers overcame a 7–6 lead by Concordia College and a second quarter injury by starting quarterback Kurvin Curry for a 23–7 victory. This marked the first Homecoming game win for the Tigers since 2004 as SSU improved to 4–5 on the season.

Junior QB JaCorey Kilcrease, last season's starting quarterback, replaced Curry in the game, engineering four scoring drives, including 17 points in the fourth quarter. He completed 9-of-11 passes for 58 yards with no interceptions. The Tigers' offense committed no turnovers while the Tigers' defense intercepted three passes. Running back Justin Babb ran for 164 yards on 19 carries and freshman kicker Derek Williams made field goals of 27, 26 and 24 yards, and kicked two extra points.

=== Edward Waters ===
Ralph Bunch Classic

	1	2	3	4	Total
Edward Waters	0	14	0	12	26
Savannah State	14	7	0	0	21

Edward Waters College quarterback Kamau Leitner threw a 42-yard touchdown pass to wide receiver Jonathan Johnson over SSU's senior free safety Javorris Jackson, who slipped on the play, with 28 seconds left as the Tigers beat SSU, 26–21, before a crowd of 3,117 at Gilman Stadium in Kingsland, Georgia.

Edward Waters improved to 3–7 and won its second in a row versus SSU (Edward Waters spoiled SSU's Homecoming, 24–7 in 2007). SSU fell to 4–6 with two games remaining in the season.

Junior QB JaCorey Kilcrease completed 13-of-24 passes (131 yards, 1 touchdown and 2 interceptions) and freshman running back Rashard Russell ran for 106 yards on 14 carries. SSU played without its regular starting quarterback, Kurvin Curry (separated his right shoulder), left tackle Rashad Jackson (illness), and wide receiver Deleon Hollinger (suspended).

=== Webber International ===
	1	2	3	4	Total
Savannah State	7	7	0	10	24
Webber International	0	0	7	0	7

The Tigers built a 14–0 halftime lead en route to a 24–7 victory over Webber International University. Freshman QB Kurvin Curry returned after injury and completed 10 of 22 passes for 194 yards, one touchdown, and one interception. The Warriors fell to 3–8 on the season while the Tigers improved to 5–6.

=== North Carolina Central ===
	1	2	3	4	Total
Savannah State	0	0	7	0	7
NC Central	3	7	0	0	10

The Tigers' effort to achieve its first non-losing season since 1998 fell short as the Tigers lost to North Carolina Central, 10–7. In its first season under coach Robby Wells the team finished 5–7. The teams' last winning season was 1998 when they finished 7–4 as a member of the NCAA's Division II. The Tigers have failed to produce a winning season since joining the Football Championship Subdivision in 2002. Quarterback Kurvin Curry passed for 99 yards (8 of 18) and had one interception.

== Roster ==
2008 Savannah State Tigers by position
Quarterbacks: 3 JaCorey Kilcrease – Junior; 10 Kurvin Curry – Freshman; 13 Malik Allah – Freshman; 14 A.J. Defilippis – Freshman; 18 Daniel Wilson – Freshman; 87 Brandon Webster – Sophomore; Running backs: 20 Justin Babb – Sophomore; 21 Sean Evans – Sophomore; 23 Timothy Jackson – Freshman; 32 Rashard Russell – Freshman; 33 Alex Miller – Freshman; 39 Ray Short – Freshman; 40 Quincy Watie – Junior; Wide receivers: 4 Deron Talley – Freshman; 5 Chris Bush – Freshman; 6 Byron Leggett – Sophomore; 7 Bernard Coleman – Senior; 9 Deleon Hollinger – Junior; 11 Isaiah Osborne – Senior; 17 Tyron Kirkland – Senior; 19 Javares Taylor – Junior; 80 B.J. Longley – Freshman; 81 Armond Denson – Sophomore; 84 Alakan Thomas – Freshman; Tight ends: 46 Howard Boone – Junior; 82 Willie Nelson – Undesignated; 83 Travis Stephens – Freshman; 85 Tanner Fetui – Junior; 86 Brandon Emerson – Senior	Fullbacks: 31 Daniel Studdard – Senior; 34 Antonio Lenton – Freshman; Offensive line: 59 Derrick Dorsey – Junior; 62 Jared Brunson – Freshman; 66 Rashad Jackson – Senior; 67 Josh Butler – Freshman; 68 Thelmore Jackson – Freshman; 70 Demetrius Edwards – Sophomore; 71 Lenworth McKenzie – Freshman; 73 McKeaver Edwards – Freshman; 75 Michael Brewster – Freshman; 76 Dan Johnson – Sophomore; 77 Donnell Collins – Freshman; 79 Craig Eckwood – Freshman; Defensive line: 50 LaDarien Redfield – Sophomore; 56 Jalvin Lovett – Sophomore; 57 Johnny Howard – Freshman; 90 Travis Alston – Freshman; 91 Chris Reed – Junior; 93 Brandon Miller – Junior; 94 Todd Bowden – Freshman; 95 Kijuanos Kelly – Freshman; 96 Juvaro Goodman – Freshman; 97 Tametric Hunt – Freshman; 98 Roland Jackson – Senior	Linebackers: 12 Frank Usher – Senior; 26 Antwan Allen – Junior; 35 Sadrak JeanBaptiste – Freshman; 43 Jeffrey Robertson – Sophomore; 45 Stanley Poole – Freshman; 47 Jordan Monico – Freshman; 48 Keon Hayward – Freshman; 49 Michael Kuku – Freshman; 51 Calvin Leonard – Senior; 52 Edwin Stevenson – Freshman; 53 Willie Hall – Junior; 54 J. Vince Cochran – Sophomore; 55 Xavier Lewis – Freshman; 58 Jarvis Thomas – Freshman; Defensive backs: 1 Marcus Darrisaw – Senior; 8 Javorris Jackson – Senior; 15 Chris Herans – Senior; 22 Richie Rucker – Freshman; 24 Jamar Graham – Sophomore; 25 Edward Ndem – Freshman; 27 Mathew Smith – Freshman; 28 Jevontae Jefferson – Freshman; 29 Patrick Brown – Freshman; 30 Chris Asbury – Freshman; 37 Darren Hunter – Sophomore; 38 Brent McCall – Freshman; 41 Emory Williams – Junior; 42 Patrick Thomas – Freshman; 44 Justin Moore – Freshman; Kickers / punters: 16 Luis Justiniano – Sophomore; 89 Jalani Landburg – Freshman; 99 Derek Williams – Freshman

== Awards and records ==
=== Awards ===
- Freshman quarterback Kurvin Curry named Offensive Independent Player of the Week (September 16–22, 2008) by Black College Sports Page.
- Senior free safety Javorris Jackson was selected to play in the eighth annual East Coast Bowl in Petersburg, Virginia. Jackson intercepted a pass as the South shutout the North, 27–0.
- Deleon Hollinger was selected as the Coca-Cola Golden Helmet Offensive Player of the Year, Derek Williams was selected as the Special Teams Player of the Year, and Darren Hunter was selected as the Defensive Player of the Year for the 2008 football season.

== Statistics ==
Current as of November 16, 2008 – All Games

=== Team ===
	Team	Opp
Scoring	223	231
Points per game	20.3	21.0
First downs	190	188
Rushing	99	93
Passing	68	81
Penalty	23	14
Total offense	3648	3493
Avg per play	5.2	5.0
Avg per game	331.6	317.5
Fumbles-Lost	23–8	23–12
Penalties-Yards	111-930	88–766
Avg per game	84.5	69.6

	Team	Opp
Punts-Yards	55-1957	44-1551
Avg per punt	35.6	35.2
Time of possession/Game	29.58	29.47
3rd down conversions	51 of 153 (33%)	47 of 135 (35%)
4th down conversions	8 of 15 (53%)	9 of 20 (45%)
Touchdowns scored	27	30
Field goals-Attempts-Long	12–19	10–15
PAT-Attempts	21–23 (91%)	17–23 (74%)
Attendance	19,272	34,855
Games / Avg per Game	4 / 4,818	5 / 6,971

==== Scores by quarter ====
	1	2	3	4	Total
Savannah State	54	94	6	69	223
Opponents	37	73	77	44	231

=== Individual Offense ===
==== Rushing ====
Name	GP-GS	Att	Gain	Loss	Net	Avg	TD	Long	Avg/G
Asbury, Chris	9–6	2	3	0	3	1.5	0	3	0.3
Babb, Justin	11–7	129	644	23	621	4.8	0	41	56.5
Bush, Chris	11–7	13	86	9	77	-5.9	0	24	7.0
Collins, Donnell	1	1	0	16	-16	-16.0	0	0	-16.0
Curry, Kurvin	10–5	128	613	191	422	3.3	3	33	42.2
Denson, Armond	10–2	2	12	0	12	6.0	0	9	1.2
Hollinger, Deleon	9–5	1	5	0	5	5.0	0	5	0.6
Jackson, Timothy	5–0	26	91	16	75	2.9	0	17	15.0
Johnson, Dan	4–4	1	0	8	-8	-8.0	0	0	-2.0
Kilcrease, JaCorey	6–1	20	59	28	31	1.5	0	14	5.2
Lenton, Antonio	9–0	20	81	5	76	3.8	0	16	8.4
Russell, Rashard	9–0	65	385	2	383	5.9	3	45	42.6
Studdard, Daniel	5–0	20	115	0	115	5.8	4	38	23.0
Talley, Deron	9–6	2	3	0	3	1.5	0	3	0.3
TEAM	4–0	2	0	3	-3	-1.5	0	0	-0.8
Webster, Brandon	1	1	0	18	-18	-18.0	0	0	-18.0
Williams, Derek	3	1	9	0	9	9.0	0	9	3.0
Total	11	433	2,103	319	1,784	4.1	10	45	162.2
Opponents	11	413	2,061	323	1,738	4.2	20	43	158.0

==== Passing ====
Name	GP-GS	Effic	Att-Cmp-Int	Pct	Yds	TD	Lng	Avg/G
Curry, Kurvin	10–5	127.89	117–215–6	54.4	1,552	12	79	155.2
Defilippis, A.J.	4–0	436.00	1–1–0	100.0	40	0	40	10.0
Hollinger, Deleon	9–5	440.67	2–3–0	66.7	55	2	30	6.1
Kilcrease, JaCorey	6–1	78.35	26–53–3	49.1	217	1	22	36.2
Williams, Derek	11–0	0.00	0–1–0	0.0	0	0	0	0.0
Total	11	122.37	146–273–9	53.5	1,864	15	79	169.5
Opponents	11	97.18	140–279–23	50.2	1,755	9	49	159.5

==== Receiving ====
Name	GP-GS	No.	Yds	Avg	TD	Long	Avg/G
Babb, Justin	11–7	18	165	9.2	2	79	15.0
Bush, Chris	11–7	38	318	8.4	1	27	28.9
Coleman, Bernard	3–0	1	11	11.0	0	11	3.7
Denson, Armond	10–2	12	290	24.2	3	46	29.0
Deron, Talley	9–6	6	84	14.0	1	33	9.3
Hollinger, Deleon	9–5	42	589	14.0	4	69	65.4
Jackson, Timothy	5–0	3	20	6.7	0	10	4.0
Kirkland, Tyron	4–0	3	42	14.0	1	32	10.5
Osborne, Isaiah	10–7	15	262	17.5	2	70	26.2
Russell, Rashard	9–0	4	28	7.0	0	19	3.1
Studdard, Daniel	2–0	1	5	5.0	0	5	2.5
Taylor, Javares	5–0	2	48	24.0	1	43	9.6
Thomas, Alakan	2–0	1	5	5.0	0	5	2.5
Total	11	146	1,864	12.8	15	79	169.5
Opponents	11	140	1,755	12.5	9	49	159.5

=== Defense ===
Name	GP	Tackles				Sacks	Pass defense			Fumbles		Blkd Kick	Saf
Name	GP	Solo	Ast	Total	TFL-Yds	No-Yds	No.-Yds	BrUp	QBH	Rcv-Yds	FF	Blkd Kick	Saf
Allah, Malik	5	5	3	8	1.0–10	1.0–10	1–0	-	-	-	-	-	-
Allen, Antwan	11	44	25	69	4.0–16	-	-	1—1	2	1	-	-	-
Alston, Travis	9	17	11	28	4.0–16	3.0–11	-	-	-	-	1	-	-
Asbury, Chris	6	5	5	10	1.0–14	-	1–53	-	-	2–0	-	-	-
Babb, Justin	11	1	-	1	-	-	-	-	-	-	-	-	-
Boone, Howard	2	1	-	1	-	-	-	-	-	-	-	-	-
Bowden, Todd	1	1	-	1	-	-	-	-	-	-	-	-	-
Bush, Chris	11	3	-	3	-	-	-	-	-	-	-	-	-
Carr, Nate	1	-	1	1	-	-	-	-	-	-	-	-	-
Cochran, Vince	11	20	14	34	6.5–21	1.0–9	1–5	-	-	1–0	-	-	-
Curry, Kurvin	10	1	-	1	-	-	-	-	-	-	-	-	-
Darrisaw, Marcus	11	22	16	38	-	-	2–9	6	-	1–0	1	-	-
Defilippis, A.J.	4	1	-	1		-	-	-	-	-	-	-	-
Deron, Talley	9	1	-	1	-	-	-	-	-	-	-	-	-
Goodman, Juvaro	6	4	2	6	-	-	-	-	-	-	-	-	
Graham, Jamar	10	15	8	23	-	-	3–46	4	-	-	-	-	-
Hall, Willie	8	10	4	14	2.5–10	1.0–9	-	-	-	1–33	2	-	-
Herans, Chris	10	15	22	37	2.5–8	1.0–6	-	1	1	-	-	-	-
Hollinger, Deleon	9	-	-	-	-	-	-	1	-	-	-	-	-
Howard, Johnny	9	7	3	10	1.0–2	-	-	-	-	-	-	-	-
Hunt, Tametric	1	-	1	1	0.5–0	-	-	-	-	-	-	-	-
Hunter, Darren	10	31	12	43	1.5–4	-	5–64	5	-	-	1	-	-
Jackson, Javorris	3	20	10	30	-	-	2–7	1	-	1–0	-	-	-
Jackson, Roland	9	9	8	17	4.5–7	0.5–3	-	2	-	-	2	-	-
JeanBaptiste, Sadrak	6	10	7	17	2.5–9	-	-	-	-	1–0	1	-	-
Jefferson, Jevontae	7	7	6	13	1.5–4	-	-	-	-	-	-	-	-
Kuku, Michael	4	4	-	4	-	-	-	-	-	-	-	-	-
Leggett, Byron	2	1	-	1	-	-	-	-	-	-	-	-	-
Lenton, Antonio	9	-	1	1	-	-	-	-	-	-	-	-	
Leonard, Calvin	10	38	40	78	6.5–27	3.5–20	3–16	2	-	1–0	1	-	-
Lovett, Jalvin	7	8	7	15	2.5–10	1.0–7	-	-	-	-	1	-	-
McCall, Brent	3	-	1	1	-	-	-	1	-	-	-	-	-
Miller, Brandon	11	8	12	20	2.0–7	-	-	2	-	-	-	-	-
Monico, Jordan	6	3	1	4	-	-	-	1	-	1–0	-	-	-
Ndem, Edward	4	8	4	12	-	-	1–11	1	-	-	1	-	-
Osborne, Isaiah	10	1	-	1	-	-	-	-	-	-	-	-	
Poole, Stanley	3	-	1	1	-	-	-	-	-	-	-	-	-
Redfield, LaDarien	10	9	11	20	2.5–13	1.5–9	-	-	-	2–0	1	-	-
Reed, Chris	11	21	20	41	8.5–33	3.5–25	-	1	2	1–0	2	-	-
Robertson, Jeffrey	4	3	9	12	2.5–11	1.0–8	-	-	-	-	-	-	-
Rucker, Richie	8	8	5	13	-	-	1–0	-	-	-	-	-	-
Russell, Rashard	9	1	-	1	-	-	-	-	-	-	-	1	-
Smith, Mathew	3	-	-	-	-	-	-	1	-	-	-	-	-
Stephens, Travis	6	2	4	6	-	-	-	-	-	-	-	-	
Stevenson, Edwin	1	-	2	2	-	-	-	-	-	-	-	-	-
Taylor, Javares	5	1	-	1	-	-	-	-	-	-	-	-	
TEAM	4	3	-	3	-	-	-	-	-	-	-	-	-
Thomas, Patrick	5	2	2	4	-	-	-	-	-	-	-	-	-
Usher, Frank	9	13	16	29	3.5–24	1.0–12	-	3	-	-	-	-	-
Williams, Derek	11	3	1	4	-	-	-	-	-	-	-	-	
Total	11	411	312	723	62–248	19–129	23–249	40	4	12–33	14	2	-
Opponents	11	419	340	759	65–251	21–148	9–245	26	2	8–13	13	3	-

=== Special teams ===
Name	Punting								Kickoffs				
Name	No.	Yds	Avg	Long	TB	FC	I20	Blkd	No.	Yds	Avg	TB	OB
Curry, Kuvin	1	37	37.0	37	1	0	0	0	0	0	0	0	0
Justiniano, Luis	0	0	0	0	0	0	0	0	3	152	50.7	0	0
TEAM	1	9	9.0	9	0	0	0	0	0	0	0	0	0
Smith, Mathew	0	0	0	0	0	0	0	0	1	50	50.0	0	0
Williams, Derek	53	1,911	36.1	48	1	4	16	1	49	2,562	52.3	2	1
Total	55	1,957	35.6	48	2	4	16	1	53	2,764	52.2	2	1
Opponents	44	1,551	35.2	68	1	13	8	1	51	2,642	51.8	4	1

Name	Punt returns					Kick returns				
Name	No.	Yds	Avg	TD	Long	No.	Yds	Avg	TD	Long
Bush, Chris	0	0	0	0	0	6	84	14.0	0	25
Darrisaw, Marcus	2	32	16.0	0	20	0	0	0	0	0
Denson, Armond	11	74	6.7	0	35	11	194	17.6	0	44
Deron, Talley	0	0	0	0	0	7	129	18.4	0	24
Herans, Chris	0	0	0	0	0	1	0	0.0	0	0
Lenton, Antonio	0	0	0	0	0	6	101	16.8	0	26
McCall, Brent	0	0	0	0	0	1	15	15.0	0	15
Osborne, Isaiah	0	0	0	0	0	1	25	25.0	0	25
Rucker, Richie	0	0	0	0	0	2	41	20.5	0	22
Russell, Rashard	1	23	23.0	1	10	7	131	18.7	0	44
Studdard, Daniel	0	0	0	0	0	1	0	0.0	0	0
Talley, Deron	0	0	0	0	0	4	63	15.8	0	22
Total	14	129	9.2	1	35	43	720	16.7	0	44
Opponents	26	262	10.1	0	36	47	1,020	21.7	0	45
