= Johnnie Cole =

American football player and coach

Playing career
- 1982–1985: Texas Southern
- Position: Quarterback

Coaching career (HC unless noted)
- 1986–1991: Texas Southern (QB/WR)
- 1992: Southwestern (KS) (AHC/OC)
- 1993–1994: Southern (WR)
- 1995: Hamburg Blue Devils (DC)
- 1995: Cincinnati (assistant)
- 1996–1998: Tennessee State (OC)
- 2000–2003: Alabama State (OC)
- 2004: Arizona Western (WR)
- 2005–2007: Lane
- 2008–2010: Texas Southern
- 2011: Fort Scott (AHC/OC)
- 2013–2015: Eastern Hills HS (TX) (assistant)

Head coaching record
- Overall: 34–32

Accomplishments and honors

Championships
- 1 SWAC (2010); 1 SWAC West Division (2010) (vacated)

Johnnie N. Cole is an American former football player and coach. He had been a high school and college football coach from 1986 to 2015, including as the head football coach at Lane College from 2005 to 2007 and at Texas Southern University from 2008 to 2010.

He had a career college football coaching record of 34–32. However, Cole had a history of ethical issues, resulting in 27 of his wins as a head coach being vacated and him being dismissed from multiple schools.

== Early life and education ==
Cole graduated from Dunbar High School in Dayton, Ohio. He then attended Texas Southern University, playing at quarterback for the Texas Southern Tigers football team from 1982 to 1985 and graduating in 1986 with a bachelor's degree in civil engineering.

== Coaching career ==
=== Assistant coach (1986–2004) ===
From 1986 to 1991, Cole was an assistant quarterbacks and wide receivers coach at Texas Southern. Then in 1992, Cole was offensive coordinator and assistant head coach for Southwestern College in Kansas. Returning to the NCAA Division I level, Cole was wide receivers coach for Southern in 1993 and 1994.

In his first professional level job, Cole became defensive coordinator for the Hamburg Blue Devils of the Football League of Europe in 1995. Later in 1995, Cole returned to college coaching as an assistant coach at Cincinnati.

From 1996 to 1998, Cole was offensive coordinator at Tennessee State, under head coach and older brother L. C. Cole. Under Cole's direction, the Tennessee State offense led every offensive statistic in the Ohio Valley Conference in a 9–3 season. However, following an NCAA investigation over rule violations related to scholarships and recruiting, Cole was reassigned to the Tennessee State division of student affairs in June 1999.

In 2000, Johnnie Cole followed L. C. to Alabama State. From 2000 to 2003, Johnnie was offensive coordinator and assistant head coach under head coach L. C. Another NCAA ethics violation followed. After an internal investigation by Alabama State found inappropriate recruiting methods, such as hiring strippers, both Cole brothers and another assistant were fired.

Johnnie Cole was wide receivers coach at Arizona Western College in 2004.

=== Lane (2005–2007) ===
From 2005 to 2007, Cole was head coach at Lane College, an NCAA Division II school in Jackson, Tennessee. After going 0–10 in his first season, Cole led Lane to an 8–3 record in 2006, followed by a 7–3 season in 2007. However, all eight wins in 2006 were vacated due to the NCAA finding a lack of institutional control in the entire Lane athletics department.

=== Texas Southern (2008–2010) ===
On December 1, 2007, Cole returned to Texas Southern to become head coach. Inheriting a team that went 0–11 in 2007, Cole led Texas Southern to two straight winning seasons in 2009 and 2010. The 2010 Texas Southern team finished 9–3 with the first Southwestern Athletic Conference title since 1968.

However, Texas Southern fired Cole on April 1, 2011. In 2012, the NCAA released a report finding numerous ethics violations in Texas Southern football under Cole, such as participation by academically ineligible student-athletes and inappropriate recruiting assistance from a donor. Based on these findings, the NCAA issued a show-cause penalty banning Cole from employment at any NCAA member school for three years, and Texas Southern vacated wins in multiple sports, including all football wins under Cole. The NCAA upheld its decision in 2013 following an appeal.

=== Later career ===
In 2011, Cole was offensive coordinator and assistant head coach at Fort Scott Community College.

From 2013 to 2016, Cole was a physical education teacher and assistant football coach at Eastern Hills High School in Fort Worth, Texas.

In 2016, an internal investigation by the Fort Worth Independent School District recommended that Cole be fired after finding evidence that he had an inappropriate relationship with a student, despite the student recanting her allegations. The FWISD school board voted 5–3, however, not to terminate Cole, so the district reassigned Cole to an off-campus athletics administrative position that does not involve interaction with students.

== Head coaching record ==
Year	Team	Overall	Conference	Standing	Bowl/playoffs
Lane Dragons (Southern Intercollegiate Athletic Conference) (2005–2006)
2005	Lane	0–10	0–9	10th	
2006	Lane	8–3 (Note: As a result of NCAA sanctions over findings of lack of institutional control, all eight wins in 2006, including five conference wins, were vacated.)	5–2	3rd	
2007	Lane	7–3	4–3	T–4th	
Lane:		15–16	9–14		
Texas Southern Tigers (Southwestern Athletic Conference) (2008–2010)
2008	Texas Southern	4–8 (Note: Due to NCAA sanctions finding extensive rule violations, all 19 Texas Southern wins from 2008 to 2010 were vacated.)	1–6	5th (West)	
2009	Texas Southern	6–5	5–2	3rd (West)	
2010	Texas Southern	9–3	8–1	T–1st (West)	
Texas Southern:		19–16	14–9		
Total:		34–32			
National championship Conference title Conference division title or championship game berth
