= George Ragsdale =

American football player and coach (born 1951)

No. 23
- Position: Running back

Personal information
- Born: December 4, 1952 (age 73); Dinwiddie, Virginia, U.S.
- Listed height: 5 ft 11 in (1.80 m)
- Listed weight: 185 lb (84 kg)

Career information
- High school: Baltimore City College (Baltimore, Maryland)
- College: North Carolina A&T
- NFL draft: 1976: 12th round, 321st overall pick

Career history

Playing
- Tampa Bay Buccaneers (1977–1979); Tampa Bay Bandits (1983); Oklahoma Outlaws (1984)

Coaching
- North Carolina A&T (1983–1988) Running backs coach & recruiting coordinator; James B. Dudley HS (NC) (1989–1991) Assistant coach; Morris Brown (1996–1999) Offensive coordinator; Norfolk State (2000–2002) Offensive coordinator; North Carolina A&T (2003–2008) Assistant coach; North Carolina A&T (2008) Interim head coach; North Carolina A&T (2009–2010) Assistant head coach; Grambling State Tigers (2013) Interim head coach; Central State (OH) (2019–2021) Running backs coach & wide receivers coach; Central State (OH) (2021) Interim head coach

Career NFL statistics
- Rushing attempts: 34
- Rushing yards: 147
- Rushing TDs: 1
- Stats at Pro Football Reference

George Ragsdale (born December 4, 1952) is an American former American football player and coach. He played professionally as a running back in the National Football League (NFL) and United States Football League (USFL).

Ragsdale played college football for the North Carolina A&T Aggies. After pro playing career, he served at various coaching duties at his alma mater as well as Morris Brown College, Norfolk State University, University of Arkansas at Pine Bluff. Ragsdale served as the interim head football coach at North Carolina A&T for the final four games of the 2008 season. On September 11, 2013, he was named interim head football coach at Grambling State University. On October 17, 2013, Ragsdale was fired as interim head coach at Grambling. He was the interim head football coach at Central State University in Wilberforce, Ohio in 2021.

== Head coaching record ==
Year	Coach	Overall	Conference	Standing	Bowl/playoffs
North Carolina A&T Aggies (Mid-Eastern Athletic Conference) (2008)
2008	North Carolina A&T	1–3 (Note: Lee Fobbs served as North Carolina A&T's head coach for the first eight games of the 2008 season before he was fired. Ragsdale was appointed interim head coach and led the Aggies for the remainder of the season. North Carolina A&T finished the season with an overall record of 3–9 and a mark of 1–7 in conference play.)	1–3	8th	
North Carolina A&T:		1–3	1–3		
Grambling State Tigers (Southwestern Athletic Conference) (2013)
2013	Grambling State	0–4 (Note: Doug Williams began the 2013 season as Grambling State's head coach, but was fired after two games. Ragsdale was appointed interim head coach and helmed the team for four games before he was relieved of his duties and replaced by Dennis Winston, who led the team for the final five games of the season. Grambling State finished the season with an overall record of 1–11 and a mark of 1–8 in conference play, placing fifth the West Division of the Southwestern Athletic Conference (SWAC))	0–2	(West)	
Grambling State:		0–4	0–2		
Central State Marauders (Southern Intercollegiate Athletic Conference) (2021–present)
2021	Central State	0–4 (Note: Bobby Rome II served as Central State's head coach for the first six games of the 2021 season before he resigned. Ragsdale was appointed interim head coach and led the Aggies for the remainder of the season. Central State finished the season with an overall record of 1–9 and a mark of 0–6 in conference play.)	0–3	5th (West)	
Central State:		0–4	0–3		
Total:		1–11			
