= Kermit Blount =

American football player and coach (born 1958)

Biographical details
- Born: May 16, 1958 (age 68); Richmond, Virginia, U.S.

Playing career
- 1976–1979: Winston-Salem State
- Position: Quarterback

Coaching career (HC unless noted)
- 1993–2009: Winston-Salem State
- 2011–2014: Delaware State
- 2015–2021: Johnson C. Smith

Head coaching record
- Overall: 123–158–3
- Bowls: 1–1

Accomplishments and honors

Championships
- 3 CIAA (1998–2000); 2 CIAA Western Division (2000–2001)

Awards
- 2× CIAA Coach of the Year (1999–2000)

Kermit Blount (born May 16, 1958) is an American football coach. He served as the head football coach at Winston-Salem State University from 1993 to 2009, Delaware State University from 2011 to 2014 and at Johnson C. Smith University in Charlotte, North Carolina from 2015 to 2021. He is a Winston-Salem State alumnus who played quarterback for the Rams from 1976 to 1979, and was a teammate of future National Football League (NFL) player Timmy Newsome.

During his tenure as head coach at his alma mater, the Rams won two Central Intercollegiate Athletic Association (CIAA) titles, in 1999 and 2000. Blount's teams also appeared in the post-season Pioneer Bowl in 1999 and 2000. He compiled a record of 91–87–3, making him currently the winningest coach in the history of the Winston-Salem State football program. He was responsible to helping former Ram football players such as Richard Huntley, Oronde Gadsden, Tory Woodbury, and William Hayes reach the NFL as either late round draft picks or free agents.

After resigning as head coach after the 2009 season, Blount worked as a special assistant to the athletic director at Winston-Salem State. The Rams football team was competing as a former transitional Division I-AA (now FCS) independent team, as Winston-Salem State's athletic program was planning to move up to the Mideastern Athletic Conference (MEAC) starting in 2006, but later decided to move back to NCAA Division II and back to the CIAA for the 2010–11 athletic season.

Blount was named the coach at Delaware State on February 3, 2011. Following the 2021 season, Blount's contract at Johnson C. Smith was not renewed.

== Head coaching record ==
Year	Team	Overall	Conference	Standing	Bowl/playoffs
Winston-Salem State Rams (Central Intercollegiate Athletic Association) (1993–2006)
1993	Winston-Salem State	6–4–1	5–2–1	3rd	
1994	Winston-Salem State	6–5	5–3	T–3rd	
1995	Winston-Salem State	4–4–2	3–3–2	T–5th	
1996	Winston-Salem State	4–7	3–5	7th	
1997	Winston-Salem State	6–4	4–3	T–3rd	
1998	Winston-Salem State	5–5	5–2	T–1st	
1999	Winston-Salem State	8–3	7–0	1st	W Pioneer
2000	Winston-Salem State	9–3	5–1	1st (Western)	L Pioneer
2001	Winston-Salem State	8–3	5–1	1st (Western)	
2002	Winston-Salem State	4–6	4–3	2nd (Western)	
2003	Winston-Salem State	7–3	5–2	2nd (Western)	
2004	Winston-Salem State	4–6	4–3	3rd (Western)	
2005	Winston-Salem State	6–4	6–1	2nd (Western)	
Winston-Salem State Rams (NCAA Division I FCS independent) (2006)
2006	Winston-Salem State	4–7			
Winston-Salem State Rams (NCAA Division I FCS independent) (2007–2008)
2007	Winston-Salem State	6–5	5–4	T–4th	
2008	Winston-Salem State	3–8	0–0	NA	
Winston-Salem State Rams (NCAA Division I FCS independent) (2009)
2009	Winston-Salem State	1–10			
Winston Salem State:		91–87–3	66–33–3		
Delaware State Hornets (Mid-Eastern Athletic Conference) (2011–2014)
2011	Delaware State	3–8	1–7	T–9th	
2012	Delaware State	6–5	5–3	T–3rd	
2013	Delaware State	5–6	5–3	T–3rd	
2014	Delaware State	2–10	2–6	T–9th	
Delaware State:		16–29	13–19		
Johnson C. Smith Golden Bulls (Central Intercollegiate Athletic Association) (2015–2021)
2015	Johnson C. Smith	4–6	3–4	4th (Southern)	
2016	Johnson C. Smith	3–7	3–4	3rd (Southern)	
2017	Johnson C. Smith	2–8	2–5	4th (Southern)	
2018	Johnson C. Smith	2–8	2–4	T–4th (Southern)	
2019	Johnson C. Smith	4–6	2–3	T–4th (Southern)	
2020–21	No team—COVID-19				
2021	Johnson C. Smith	1–7	1–5	T–4th (Southern)	
Johnson C. Smith:		16–42	14–26		
Total:		123–158–3			
National championship Conference title Conference division title or championship game berth
