= 2010 Jackson State Tigers football team =

American college football season

2010 Jackson State Tigers football

SWAC East Division co-champion
- Conference: Southwestern Athletic Conference
- East Division
- Record: 8–3 (6–3 SWAC)
- Head coach: Rick Comegy (5th season)
- Offensive coordinator: Earnest Wilson (1st season)
- Home stadium: Mississippi Veterans Memorial Stadium

2010 Southwestern Athletic Conference football standings
	Conf.			Overall
Team	W		L	W		L
East Division
Alabama State xy	6	–	3	7	–	5
Jackson State x	6	–	3	8	–	3
Alcorn State	4	–	5	5	–	6
Alabama A&M	2	–	7	3	–	8
Mississippi Valley State	0	–	9	0	–	10
West Division
Texas Southern xy$	8	–	1	9	–	3
No. 23 Grambling State x	8	–	1	9	–	2
Prairie View A&M	6	–	3	7	–	4
Arkansas–Pine Bluff	4	–	5	5	–	6
Southern	1	–	8	2	–	9
Championship: Texas Southern 11, Alabama State 6
$ – Conference champion; x – Division champion/co-champions; y – Championship game participant; Rankings from The Sports Network Poll

The 2010 Jackson State Tigers football team represented Jackson State University as a member of the East Division of the Southwestern Athletic Conference (SWAC) during the 2010 NCAA Division I FCS football season. Led by fifth-year head coach Rick Comegy, the Tigers compiled an overall record of 8–3 with a mark of 6–3 in conference place, sharing the SWAC East Division title with Alabama State.

== Schedule ==
Date	Time	Opponent	Site	Result	Attendance	Source
September 4		Delta State*	Mississippi Veterans Memorial Stadium; Jackson, MS	W 32–17		
September 11		vs. Tennessee State*	Liberty Bowl; Memphis, TN (Southern Heritage Classic)	W 33–26	44,688	
September 18		at Grambling State	Eddie G. Robinson Memorial Stadium; Grambling, LA	L 21–28	7,057	
September 25		Mississippi Valley State	Mississippi Veterans Memorial Stadium; Jackson, MS	W 43–7	18,020	
October 9		Alabama A&M	Mississippi Veterans Memorial Stadium; Jackson, MS	W 30–14	24,269	
October 16		Southern	Mississippi Veterans Memorial Stadium; Jackson, MS (rivalry)	W 49–45		
October 23		at Texas Southern	Joe K. Butler Stadium; Houston, TX	L 18–21		
October 30		Prairie View A&M	Mississippi Veterans Memorial Stadium; Jackson, MS	W 30–13		
November 6		at Alabama State	Cramton Bowl; Montgomery, AL	L 30–32		
November 13	2:30 p.m.	at Arkansas–Pine Bluff	Golden Lion Stadium; Pine Bluff, AR	W 52–30		
November 20		Alcorn State	Mississippi Veterans Memorial Stadium; Jackson, MS (Capital City Classic)	W 27–14		
*Non-conference game; All times are in Central time
