= 2008 Howard Bison football team =

American college football season

2008 Howard Bison football
- Conference: Mid-Eastern Athletic Conference
- Record: 1–10 (0–8 MEAC)
- Head coach: Carey Bailey (2nd season)
- Home stadium: William H. Greene Stadium

2008 Mid-Eastern Athletic Conference football standings
	Conf.			Overall
Team	W		L	W		L
No. 13 South Carolina State $^	8	–	0	10	–	2
Florida A&M	5	–	3	9	–	3
Bethune–Cookman	5	–	3	8	–	3
Hampton	5	–	3	6	–	5
Delaware State	5	–	3	5	–	6
Morgan State	4	–	4	6	–	6
Norfolk State	3	–	5	5	–	7
North Carolina A&T	1	–	7	3	–	9
Howard	0	–	8	1	–	10
Winston-Salem State *	0	–	0	3	–	8
$ – Conference champion; ^ – FCS playoff participant; * – Ineligible for conference championship; Rankings from The Sports Network poll

The 2008 Howard Bison football team represented Howard University as a member of the Mid-Eastern Athletic Conference (MEAC) during the 2008 NCAA Division I FCS football season. Led by second-year head coach Carey Bailey, the Bison compiled an overall record of 1–10, with a conference record of 0–8, and finished ninth in the MEAC.

== Schedule ==
Date	Opponent	Site	Result	Attendance	Source
September 7	Georgetown*	William H. Greene Stadium; Washington, DC	L 7–12	6,085	
September 13	at Hampton	Armstrong Stadium; Hampton, VA (rivalry)	L 27–38		
September 20	Florida A&M	William H. Greene Stadium; Washington, DC	L 24–51	5,297	
September 27	vs. Savannah State*	Nathaniel Traz Powell Stadium; Westview, FL (Miami Classic)	W 49–21	3,926	
October 4	at Winston-Salem State	Bowman Gray Stadium; Winston-Salem, NC	L 10–34	5,107	
October 18	Morgan State	William H. Greene Stadium; Washington, DC (rivalry)	L 30–31 ^{2OT}	6,853	
October 25	at North Carolina A&T	Aggie Stadium; Greensboro, NC	L 20–21	4,358	
November 1	Norfolk State	William H. Greene Stadium; Washington, DC	L 12–49	2,086	
November 6	at No. 19 South Carolina State	Oliver C. Dawson Stadium; Orangeburg, SC	L 0–56	11,239	
November 15	at Bethune–Cookman	Municipal Stadium; Daytona Beach, FL	L 12–14	3,152	
November 22	Delaware State	William H. Greene Stadium; Washington, DC	L 6–10	2,161	
*Non-conference game; Rankings from The Sports Network Poll released prior to the game
