= 2008 Mississippi Valley State Delta Devils football team =

American college football season

2008 Mississippi Valley State Delta Devils football
- Conference: Southwestern Athletic Conference
- East Division
- Record: 3–8 (1–8 SWAC)
- Head coach: Willie Totten (7th season)
- Home stadium: Rice–Totten Stadium

2008 Southwestern Athletic Conference football standings
	Conf.			Overall
Team	W		L	W		L
East Division
Jackson State xy	6	–	1	7	–	5
Alabama A&M	4	–	3	5	–	7
Alabama State	2	–	5	3	–	8
Mississippi Valley State	1	–	6	3	–	8
Alcorn State	1	–	6	2	–	10
West Division
Grambling State xy$	7	–	0	11	–	2
Prairie View A&M	6	–	1	9	–	1
Southern	5	–	2	6	–	5
Arkansas–Pine Bluff	2	–	5	3	–	9
Texas Southern	1	–	6	4	–	8
Championship: Grambling State 41, Jackson State 9
$ – Conference champion; x – Division champion/co-champions; y – Championship game participant

The 2008 Mississippi Valley State Delta Devils football team represented Mississippi Valley State University as a member of the Southwestern Athletic Conference (SWAC) during the 2008 NCAA Division I FCS football season. Led by seventh-year head coach Willie Totten, the Delta Devils compiled an overall record of 3–8 and a mark of 1–8 in conference play, and finished tied for fourth in the SWAC East Division.

== Schedule ==
Date	Time	Opponent	Site	Result	Attendance	Source
August 30		Texas College*	Rice–Totten Stadium; Itta Bena, MS	W 38–0		
September 13		at Southern	A. W. Mumford Stadium; Baton Rouge, LA	L 7–49		
September 20		No. 25 Prairie View A&M	Rice–Totten Stadium; Itta Bena, MS	L 15–49		
September 25		at Alabama State	Cramton Bowl; Montgomery, AL	L 7–47		
October 11		Alcorn State	Rice–Totten Stadium; Itta Bena, MS	L 21–35		
October 18	12:00 p.m.	Savannah State*	Rice–Totten Stadium; Itta Bena, MS	W 22–20	3,457	
October 25		at Jackson State	Mississippi Veterans Memorial Stadium; Jackson, MS	L 27–29		
November 1		No. 24 Grambling State	Rice–Totten Stadium; Itta Bena, MS	L 14–35		
November 8		at Texas Southern	Alexander Durley Sports Complex; Houston, TX	W 58–44		
November 15		at Arkansas–Pine Bluff	Golden Lion Stadium; Pine Bluff, AR	L 0–34		
November 22	1:00 p.m.	Alabama A&M	Rice–Totten Stadium; Itta Bena, MS	L 23–58	789	
*Non-conference game; Rankings from The Sports Network Poll released prior to the game; All times are in Central time
