= 2010 Arkansas–Pine Bluff Golden Lions football team =

American college football season

2010 Arkansas–Pine Bluff Golden Lions football
- Conference: Southwestern Athletic Conference
- West Division
- Record: 5–6 (4–5 SWAC)
- Head coach: Monte Coleman (3rd season)
- Offensive coordinator: Jerry Mack (1st season)
- Home stadium: Golden Lion Stadium

2010 Southwestern Athletic Conference football standings
	Conf.			Overall
Team	W		L	W		L
East Division
Alabama State xy	6	–	3	7	–	5
Jackson State x	6	–	3	8	–	3
Alcorn State	4	–	5	5	–	6
Alabama A&M	2	–	7	3	–	8
Mississippi Valley State	0	–	9	0	–	10
West Division
Texas Southern xy$	8	–	1	9	–	3
No. 23 Grambling State x	8	–	1	9	–	2
Prairie View A&M	6	–	3	7	–	4
Arkansas–Pine Bluff	4	–	5	5	–	6
Southern	1	–	8	2	–	9
Championship: Texas Southern 11, Alabama State 6
$ – Conference champion; x – Division champion/co-champions; y – Championship game participant; Rankings from The Sports Network Poll

The 2010 Arkansas–Pine Bluff Golden Lions football team represented the University of Arkansas at Pine Bluff in the 2010 NCAA Division I FCS football season as member of the West Division of the Southwestern Athletic Conference (SWAC). The Golden Lions were led by third year head coach Monte Coleman and played their home games at Golden Lion Stadium. They finished the season with an overall record of 5–6.

== Schedule ==
Date	Time	Opponent	Site	TV	Result	Attendance	Source
September 4	8:05 pm	at UTEP*	Sun Bowl; El Paso, TX		L 10–31	30,029	
September 11	7:00 pm	Alabama State	Cramton Bowl; Montgomery, AL		L 31–38		
September 25	3:00 pm	vs. Clark Atlanta	Edward Jones Dome; St. Louis, MO		W 35–19		
October 2	6:00 pm	at Southern	Ace W. Mumford Stadium; Baton Rouge, LA		W 41–23		
October 7	6:30 pm	Prairie View A&M	Golden Lion Stadium; Pine Bluff, AR	ESPNU	L 6–21		
October 16	6:00 pm	Alabama A&M	Golden Lion Stadium; Pine Bluff, AR		W 21–14		
October 21	6:00 pm	at Alcorn State	Jack Spinks Stadium; Lowman, MS	ESPNU	W 39–35		
October 30	1:30 pm	vs. No. 23 Grambling State	War Memorial Stadium; Little Rock, AR (Literacy Classic)		L 25–35	29,373	
November 6	2:30 pm	Mississippi Valley State^{†}	Rice–Totten Stadium; Itta Bena, MS		W 49–20		
November 13	2:30 pm	Jackson State	Golden Lion Stadium; Pine Bluff, AR		L 30–52		
November 20	7:00 pm	at Texas Southern	Alexander Durley Sports Complex; Houston, TX		L 13–20		
*Non-conference game; ^{†}Homecoming; Rankings from The Sports Network Poll released prior to the game; All times are in Central time
