= 2008 Bethune–Cookman Wildcats football team =

American college football season

2008 Bethune–Cookman Wildcats football
- Conference: Mid-Eastern Athletic Conference
- Record: 8–3 (5–3 MEAC)
- Head coach: Alvin Wyatt (12th season)
- Home stadium: Municipal Stadium

2008 Mid-Eastern Athletic Conference football standings
	Conf.			Overall
Team	W		L	W		L
No. 13 South Carolina State $^	8	–	0	10	–	2
Florida A&M	5	–	3	9	–	3
Bethune–Cookman	5	–	3	8	–	3
Hampton	5	–	3	6	–	5
Delaware State	5	–	3	5	–	6
Morgan State	4	–	4	6	–	6
Norfolk State	3	–	5	5	–	7
North Carolina A&T	1	–	7	3	–	9
Howard	0	–	8	1	–	10
Winston-Salem State *	0	–	0	3	–	8
$ – Conference champion; ^ – FCS playoff participant; * – Ineligible for conference championship; Rankings from The Sports Network poll

The 2008 Bethune–Cookman Wildcats football team represented Bethune–Cookman University as a member of the Mid-Eastern Athletic Conference (MEAC) during the 2008 NCAA Division I FCS football season. Led by 12th-year head coach Alvin Wyatt, the Wildcats compiled an overall record of 8–3, with a mark of 5–3 in conference play, and finished tied for second in the MEAC.

== Schedule ==
Date	Opponent	Site	Result	Attendance	Source
September 6	Alabama State*	Municipal Stadium; Daytona Beach, FL	W 28–7		
September 13	vs. South Carolina State	Johnson Hagood Stadium; Charleston, SC (Lowcountry Classic)	L 19–28	12,495	
September 20	Savannah State*	Municipal Stadium; Daytona Beach, FL	W 34–9	4,131	
September 27	Norfolk State	Municipal Stadium; Daytona Beach, FL	W 33–17	5,228	
October 4	at Morgan State	Hughes Stadium; Baltimore, MD	W 31–27	4,389	
October 11	Delaware State	Municipal Stadium; Daytona Beach, FL	L 20–26	9,136	
October 25	at Winston-Salem State	Bowman Gray Stadium; Winston-Salem, NC	W 27–6	12,121	
November 1	North Carolina A&T	Municipal Stadium; Daytona Beach, FL	W 24–14	3,145	
November 8	at Hampton	Armstrong Stadium; Hampton, VA	W 17–6	1,270	
November 15	Howard	Municipal Stadium; Daytona Beach, FL	W 14–12	3,152	
November 22	vs. Florida A&M	Florida Citrus Bowl; Orlando, FL (Florida Classic)	L 35–58	60,712	
*Non-conference game
