= 2010 Alabama State Hornets football team =

American college football season

2010 Alabama State Hornets football

SWAC East Division co-champion

SWAC Championship Game, L 6–11 vs. Texas Southern
- Conference: Southwestern Athletic Conference
- East Division
- Record: 7–5 (6–3 SWAC)
- Head coach: Reggie Barlow (4th season)
- Offensive coordinator: Melvin Spears (1st season)
- Defensive coordinator: Cedric Thornton (1st season)
- Home stadium: Cramton Bowl

2010 Southwestern Athletic Conference football standings
| | Conf. | | | Overall |
| Team | W | | L | W | | L |
|---|---|---|---|---|---|---|
East Division
| Alabama State xy | 6 | – | 3 | 7 | – | 5 |
| Jackson State x | 6 | – | 3 | 8 | – | 3 |
| Alcorn State | 4 | – | 5 | 5 | – | 6 |
| Alabama A&M | 2 | – | 7 | 3 | – | 8 |
| Mississippi Valley State | 0 | – | 9 | 0 | – | 10 |
West Division
| Texas Southern xy$ | 8 | – | 1 | 9 | – | 3 |
| No. 23 Grambling State x | 8 | – | 1 | 9 | – | 2 |
| Prairie View A&M | 6 | – | 3 | 7 | – | 4 |
| Arkansas–Pine Bluff | 4 | – | 5 | 5 | – | 6 |
| Southern | 1 | – | 8 | 2 | – | 9 |
Championship: Texas Southern 11, Alabama State 6
$ – Conference champion; x – Division champion/co-champions; y – Championship game participant; Rankings from The Sports Network Poll

The 2010 Alabama State Hornets football team represented Alabama State University as a member of the Southwestern Athletic Conference (SWAC) during the 2010 NCAA Division I FCS football season. Led by fourth-year head coach Reggie Barlow, the Hornets compiled an overall record of 7–5, with a mark of 6–3 in conference play, finished as SWAC East Division co-champion, and lost to Texas Southern in the SWAC Championship Game.

== Schedule ==
| Date | Opponent | Site | Result | Attendance | Source |
|---|---|---|---|---|---|
| September 4 | Mississippi Valley State | Cramton Bowl; Montgomery, AL | W 34–6 | | |
| September 11 | Arkansas–Pine Bluff | Cramton Bowl; Montgomery, AL | W 38–31 | | |
| September 18 | at Prairie View A&M | Edward L. Blackshear Field; Prairie View, TX | W 18–15 | | |
| September 25 | at Alcorn State | Jack Spinks Stadium; Lorman, MS | L 21–41 | | |
| October 2 | Texas Southern | Cramton Bowl; Montgomery, AL | L 7–21 | | |
| October 9 | at Grambling State | Eddie G. Robinson Memorial Stadium; Grambling, LA | L 7–22 | | |
| October 23 | Savannah State* | Cramton Bowl; Montgomery, AL | W 24–0 | 5,237 | |
| October 30 | vs. Alabama A&M | Legion Field; Birmingham, AL (Magic City Classic) | W 31–10 | | |
| November 6 | Jackson State | Cramton Bowl; Montgomery, AL | W 32–30 | | |
| November 13 | at Southern | A. W. Mumford Stadium; Baton Rouge, LA | W 21–19 | | |
| November 25 | Tuskegee* | Cramton Bowl; Montgomery, AL (Turkey Day Classic) | L 10–17 | | |
| December 11 | vs. Texas Southern | Legion Field; Birmingham, AL (SWAC Championship Game) | L 6–11 | 22,350 | |
*Non-conference game
