= 2008 Florida A&M Rattlers football team =

American college football season

2008 Florida A&M Rattlers football
- Conference: Mid-Eastern Athletic Conference
- Record: 9–3 (5–3 MEAC)
- Head coach: Joe Taylor (1st season)
- Home stadium: Bragg Memorial Stadium

2008 Mid-Eastern Athletic Conference football standings
	Conf.			Overall
Team	W		L	W		L
No. 13 South Carolina State $^	8	–	0	10	–	2
Florida A&M	5	–	3	9	–	3
Bethune–Cookman	5	–	3	8	–	3
Hampton	5	–	3	6	–	5
Delaware State	5	–	3	5	–	6
Morgan State	4	–	4	6	–	6
Norfolk State	3	–	5	5	–	7
North Carolina A&T	1	–	7	3	–	9
Howard	0	–	8	1	–	10
Winston-Salem State *	0	–	0	3	–	8
$ – Conference champion; ^ – FCS playoff participant; * – Ineligible for conference championship; Rankings from The Sports Network poll

The 2008 Florida A&M Rattlers football team represented Florida A&M University as a member of the Mid-Eastern Athletic Conference (MEAC) during the 2008 NCAA Division I FCS football season. Led by first-year head coach Joe Taylor, the Rattlers compiled an overall record of 9–3, with a mark of 5–3 in conference play, and finished tied for second in the MEAC.

== Schedule ==
Date	Opponent	Site	Result	Attendance	Source
August 30	Alabama State*	Bragg Memorial Stadium; Tallahassee, FL	W 30–20	18,088	
September 4	at Delaware State	Alumni Stadium; Dover, DE	L 28–35 ^{OT}	6,216	
September 20	at Howard	William H. Greene Stadium; Washington, DC	W 51–24	5,297	
September 27	vs. No. 23 Tennessee State*	Georgia Dome; Atlanta, GA (Atlanta Football Classic)	W 28–21	50,428	
October 4	South Carolina State	Bragg Memorial Stadium; Tallahassee, FL	L 21–28	12,462	
October 9	Winston-Salem State*	Bragg Memorial Stadium; Tallahassee, FL	W 23–0	15,448	
October 18	at Southern*	A. W. Mumford Stadium; Baton Rouge, LA	W 52–49	15,107	
October 25	at Norfolk State	William "Dick" Price Stadium; Norfolk, VA	W 31–28	13,889	
November 1	Morgan State^{†}	Bragg Memorial Stadium; Tallahassee, FL	L 10–13	16,205	
November 8	at North Carolina A&T	Aggie Stadium; Greensboro, NC	W 45–7	7,036	
November 15	Hampton	Bragg Memorial Stadium; Tallahassee, FL (College GameDay)	W 45–24	9,711	
November 22	vs. Bethune–Cookman	Florida Citrus Bowl; Orlando, FL (Florida Classic)	W 58–35	60,712	
*Non-conference game; ^{†}Homecoming; Rankings from The Sports Network Poll released prior to the game
