= 2010 Prairie View A&M Panthers football team =

American college football season

2010 Prairie View A&M Panthers football
- Conference: Southwestern Athletic Conference
- Record: 7–4 (6–3 SWAC)
- Head coach: Henry Frazier III (7th season)
- Home stadium: Edward L. Blackshear Field

2010 Southwestern Athletic Conference football standings
	Conf.			Overall
Team	W		L	W		L
East Division
Alabama State xy	6	–	3	7	–	5
Jackson State x	6	–	3	8	–	3
Alcorn State	4	–	5	5	–	6
Alabama A&M	2	–	7	3	–	8
Mississippi Valley State	0	–	9	0	–	10
West Division
Texas Southern xy$	8	–	1	9	–	3
No. 23 Grambling State x	8	–	1	9	–	2
Prairie View A&M	6	–	3	7	–	4
Arkansas–Pine Bluff	4	–	5	5	–	6
Southern	1	–	8	2	–	9
Championship: Texas Southern 11, Alabama State 6
$ – Conference champion; x – Division champion/co-champions; y – Championship game participant; Rankings from The Sports Network Poll

The 2010 Prairie View A&M Panthers football team represented Prairie View A&M University as a member of the Southwestern Athletic Conference (SWAC) during the 2010 NCAA Division I FCS football season. Led by seventh-year head coach Henry Frazier III, the Panthers compiled an overall record of 7–4 and a mark of 6–3 in conference play, and finished second in the SWAC West Division.

== Schedule ==
Date	Opponent	Site	Result	Attendance	Source
September 5	at Texas Southern	Reliant Stadium; Houston, TX (Labor Day Classic)	W 16–14	22,062	
September 11	at Southern Miss*	M. M. Roberts Stadium; Hattiesburg, MS	L 7–34	27,316	
September 18	Alabama State	Edward L. Blackshear Field; Prairie View, TX	L 15–18		
September 25	vs. Grambling State	Cotton Bowl; Dallas, TX (State Fair Classic)	L 17–34		
October 2	at Mississippi Valley State	Charles Kerg Field; Greenville, MS	W 34–13		
October 7	at Arkansas–Pine Bluff	Golden Lion Stadium; Pine Bluff, AR	W 21–6		
October 16	Lincoln (MO)*	Edward L. Blackshear Field; Prairie View, TX	W 45–12		
October 23	vs. Southern	Independence Stadium; Shreveport, LA (Shreveport Classic)	W 30–16	19,979	
October 30	at Jackson State	Mississippi Veterans Memorial Stadium; Jackson, MS	L 13–30		
November 13	Alcorn State	Edward L. Blackshear Field; Prairie View, TX	W 35–27		
November 20	at Alabama A&M	Louis Crews Stadium; Normal, AL	W 35–14		
*Non-conference game
