= 2008 South Carolina State Bulldogs football team =

American college football season

2008 South Carolina State Bulldogs football

MEAC champion

NCAA Division I First Round, L 21–37 at Appalachian State
- Conference: Mid-Eastern Athletic Conference

Ranking
- Sports Network: No. 13
- Record: 10–3 (8–0 MEAC)
- Head coach: Oliver Pough (7th season)
- Home stadium: Oliver C. Dawson Stadium

2008 Mid-Eastern Athletic Conference football standings
	Conf.			Overall
Team	W		L	W		L
No. 13 South Carolina State $^	8	–	0	10	–	2
Florida A&M	5	–	3	9	–	3
Bethune–Cookman	5	–	3	8	–	3
Hampton	5	–	3	6	–	5
Delaware State	5	–	3	5	–	6
Morgan State	4	–	4	6	–	6
Norfolk State	3	–	5	5	–	7
North Carolina A&T	1	–	7	3	–	9
Howard	0	–	8	1	–	10
Winston-Salem State *	0	–	0	3	–	8
$ – Conference champion; ^ – FCS playoff participant; * – Ineligible for conference championship; Rankings from The Sports Network poll

The 2008 South Carolina State Bulldogs football team represented South Carolina State University as a member of the Mid-Eastern Athletic Conference (MEAC) during the 2008 NCAA Division I FCS football season. Led by seventh-year head coach Oliver Pough, the Bulldogs compiled an overall record of 10–3, with a mark of 8–0 in conference play, and finished as MEAC champion. South Carolina State advanced to the NCAA Division I Football Championship playoffs, where they were defeated by Appalachian State in the first round.

== Schedule ==
Date	Opponent	Rank	Site	TV	Result	Attendance	Source
August 30	at UCF*		Bright House Networks Stadium; Orlando, FL		L 0–17	42,126	
September 6	Benedict*		Oliver C. Dawson Stadium; Orangeburg, SC		W 42–3	10,020	
September 13	vs. Bethune–Cookman		Johnson Hagood Stadium; Charleston, SC (Lowcountry Classic)		W 28–19	12,495	
September 20	at No. 23 (FBS) Clemson*		Memorial Stadium; Clemson, SC		L 0–54	78,607	
September 27	at Winston-Salem State		Bowman Gray Stadium; Winston-Salem, NC		W 43–17		
October 4	at Florida A&M		Bragg Memorial Stadium; Tallahassee, FL		W 28–21	12,462	
October 11	Norfolk State		Oliver C. Dawson Stadium; Orangeburg, SC		W 24–23	16,003	
October 25	No. 22 Hampton		Oliver C. Dawson Stadium; Orangeburg, SC		W 35–13	17,159	
November 1	at Delaware State	No. 22	Alumni Stadium; Dover, DE		W 23–17	3,012	
November 6	Howard	No. 19	Oliver C. Dawson Stadium; Orangeburg, SC		W 56–0	11,239	
November 15	at Morgan State	No. 15	Hughes Stadium; Baltimore, MD		W 32–0	512	
November 22	at North Carolina A&T	No. 15	Aggie Stadium; Greensboro, NC (rivalry)		W 55–0	7,343	
November 29	at No. 2 Appalachian State*	No. 13	Kidd Brewer Stadium; Boone, NC (NCAA Division I First Round)	ESPNU	L 21–37	13,712	
*Non-conference game; Rankings from The Sports Network Poll released prior to the game
