= 2008 Alcorn State Braves football team =

American college football season

2008 Alcorn State Braves football
- Conference: Southwestern Athletic Conference
- East Division
- Record: 2–10 (2–7 SWAC)
- Head coach: Ernest T. Jones (1st season)
- Home stadium: Jack Spinks Stadium

2008 Southwestern Athletic Conference football standings
	Conf.			Overall
Team	W		L	W		L
East Division
Jackson State xy	6	–	1	7	–	5
Alabama A&M	4	–	3	5	–	7
Alabama State	2	–	5	3	–	8
Mississippi Valley State	1	–	6	3	–	8
Alcorn State	1	–	6	2	–	10
West Division
Grambling State xy$	7	–	0	11	–	2
Prairie View A&M	6	–	1	9	–	1
Southern	5	–	2	6	–	5
Arkansas–Pine Bluff	2	–	5	3	–	9
Texas Southern	1	–	6	4	–	8
Championship: Grambling State 41, Jackson State 9
$ – Conference champion; x – Division champion/co-champions; y – Championship game participant

The 2008 Alcorn State Braves football team represented Alcorn State University as a member of the Southwestern Athletic Conference (SWAC) during the 2008 NCAA Division I FCS football season. Led by first-year head coach Ernest T. Jones, the Braves compiled an overall record of 2–10, with a conference record of 2–7, and finished tied for fourth in the SWAC East Division.

== Schedule ==
Date	Time	Opponent	Site	Result	Attendance	Source
August 30		Southeastern Louisiana*	Jack Spinks Stadium; Lorman, MS	L 28–34		
September 6		at Grambling State	Eddie G. Robinson Memorial Stadium; Grambling, LA	L 0–29		
September 13		at Troy*	Movie Gallery Stadium; Troy, AL	L 0–65	22,105	
September 18		Arkansas–Pine Bluff	Jack Spinks Stadium; Lorman, MS	W 13–3		
September 27		Southern	Jack Spinks Stadium; Lorman, MS	L 12–15		
October 4		at New Mexico State*	Aggie Memorial Stadium; Las Cruces, NM	L 10–45	11,374	
October 11		at Mississippi Valley State	Rice–Totten Stadium; Itta Bena, MS	W 35–21		
October 18	6:00 p.m.	at Alabama A&M	Louis Crews Stadium; Normal, AL	L 13–20	2,917	
October 25		Texas Southern	Jack Spinks Stadium; Lorman, MS	L 29–30		
November 1		Alabama State	Jack Spinks Stadium; Lorman, MS	L 17–24		
November 15		at Prairie View A&M	Edward L. Blackshear Field; Prairie View, TX	L 3–37		
November 22		at Jackson State	Mississippi Veterans Memorial Stadium; Jackson, MS (Soul Bowl)	L 21–26	30,005	
*Non-conference game; All times are in Central time
