= 2008 Delaware State Hornets football team =

American college football season

2008 Delaware State Hornets football
- Conference: Mid-Eastern Athletic Conference
- Record: 5–6 (5–3 MEAC)
- Head coach: Al Lavan (5th season)
- Offensive coordinator: Doug Sams (2nd season)
- Defensive coordinator: Rayford Petty (2nd season)
- Home stadium: Alumni Stadium

2008 Mid-Eastern Athletic Conference football standings
	Conf.			Overall
Team	W		L	W		L
No. 13 South Carolina State $^	8	–	0	10	–	2
Florida A&M	5	–	3	9	–	3
Bethune–Cookman	5	–	3	8	–	3
Hampton	5	–	3	6	–	5
Delaware State	5	–	3	5	–	6
Morgan State	4	–	4	6	–	6
Norfolk State	3	–	5	5	–	7
North Carolina A&T	1	–	7	3	–	9
Howard	0	–	8	1	–	10
Winston-Salem State *	0	–	0	3	–	8
$ – Conference champion; ^ – FCS playoff participant; * – Ineligible for conference championship; Rankings from The Sports Network poll

The 2008 Delaware State Hornets football team represented Delaware State University as a member of the Mid-Eastern Athletic Conference (MEAC) in the 2008 NCAA Division I FCS football season. They were led by fifth-year head coach Al Lavan and played their home games at Alumni Stadium. They and finished the season with a record of 5–6 overall and 5–3 in MEAC play, tying for second place.

== Schedule ==
Date	Time	Opponent	Site	TV	Result	Attendance	Source
September 4	7:30 p.m.	Florida A&M	Alumni Stadium; Dover, DE	ESPNU	W 35–28 ^{OT}	6,216	
September 13	2:00 p.m.	at Kent State*	Dix Stadium; Kent, OH		L 3–24	8,529	
September 27	7:00 p.m.	Central Connecticut State*	Alumni Stadium; Dover, DE		L 10–28	3,254	
October 4	1:00 p.m.	Hampton	Alumni Stadium; Dover, DE		L 14–17	5,218	
October 11	4:00 p.m.	at Bethune-Cookman	Municipal Stadium; Daytona Beach, FL		W 26–20	9,136	
October 18	1:00 p.m.	North Carolina A&T^{†}	Alumni Stadium; Dover, DE		W 42–7	6,089	
October 25	1:00 p.m.	at Morgan State	Hughes Stadium; Baltimore, MD		L 3–20	6,312	
November 1	1:00 p.m.	No. 21 South Carolina State	Alumni Stadium; Dover, DE	ESPNU	L 17–23	3,012	
November 8	1:00 p.m.	Winston-Salem State	Alumni Stadium; Dover, DE		L 23–24	891	
November 15	1:00 p.m.	at Norfolk State	William "Dick" Price Stadium; Norfolk, VA	ESPNU	W 34–28	3,758	
November 22	1:00 p.m.	at Howard	William H. Greene Stadium; Washington, DC		W 10–6	2,161	
*Non-conference game; ^{†}Homecoming; Rankings from The Sports Network Poll released prior to the game; All times are in Eastern time
