= 2008 Prairie View A&M Panthers football team =

American college football season

2008 Prairie View A&M Panthers football
- Conference: Southwestern Athletic Conference
- West Division
- Record: 9–1 (7–1 SWAC)
- Head coach: Henry Frazier III (5th season)
- Home stadium: Edward L. Blackshear Field; Reliant Stadium

2008 Southwestern Athletic Conference football standings
| | Conf. | | | Overall |
| Team | W | | L | W | | L |
|---|---|---|---|---|---|---|
East Division
| Jackson State xy | 6 | – | 1 | 7 | – | 5 |
| Alabama A&M | 4 | – | 3 | 5 | – | 7 |
| Alabama State | 2 | – | 5 | 3 | – | 8 |
| Mississippi Valley State | 1 | – | 6 | 3 | – | 8 |
| Alcorn State | 1 | – | 6 | 2 | – | 10 |
West Division
| Grambling State xy$ | 7 | – | 0 | 11 | – | 2 |
| Prairie View A&M | 6 | – | 1 | 9 | – | 1 |
| Southern | 5 | – | 2 | 6 | – | 5 |
| Arkansas–Pine Bluff | 2 | – | 5 | 3 | – | 9 |
| Texas Southern | 1 | – | 6 | 4 | – | 8 |
Championship: Grambling State 41, Jackson State 9
$ – Conference champion; x – Division champion/co-champions; y – Championship game participant

The 2008 Prairie View A&M Panthers football team represented Prairie View A&M University as a member of the Southwestern Athletic Conference (SWAC) during the 2008 NCAA Division I FCS football season. Led by fifth-year head coach Henry Frazier III, the Panthers compiled an overall record of 9–1, with a mark of 7–1 in conference play, and finished second in the SWAC West Division.

== Schedule ==
| Date | Time | Opponent | Site | Result | Attendance | Source |
|---|---|---|---|---|---|---|
| August 30 | | at Texas Southern | Reliant Stadium; Houston, TX (Labor Day Classic) | W 34–14 | | |
| September 6 | | Texas College* | Edward L. Blackshear Field; Prairie View, TX | W 53–0 | | |
| September 13 | | at Sam Houston State* | Bowers Stadium; Huntsville, TX | Canceled (Note: The game against Sam Houston State scheduled for September 13 was canceled due to the impacts of Hurricane Ike.) | | |
| September 20 | | at Mississippi Valley State | Rice–Totten Stadium; Itta Bena, MS | W 49–15 | | |
| September 27 | | vs. Morehouse* | Los Angeles Memorial Coliseum; Los Angeles, CA (Angel City Classic) | W 28–17 | | |
| October 4 | | vs. Grambling State | Cotton Bowl; Dallas, TX (State Fair Classic) | L 16–40 | 54,315 | |
| October 11 | | Alabama State | Edward L. Blackshear Field; Prairie View, TX | W 27–6 | | |
| October 18 | | at Arkansas–Pine Bluff | Golden Lion Stadium; Pine Bluff, AR | W 15–0 | | |
| October 25 | | Southern | Reliant Stadium; Houston, TX | W 24–23 | | |
| November 8 | 1:00 p.m. | at Alabama A&M | Louis Crews Stadium; Normal, AL | W 24–10 | 3,810 | |
| November 15 | | Alcorn State | Edward L. Blackshear Field; Prairie View, TX | W 37–3 | | |
*Non-conference game; All times are in Central time
