= 2008 Morgan State Bears football team =

American college football season

2008 Morgan State Bears football
- Conference: Mid-Eastern Athletic Conference
- Record: 6–6 (4–4 MEAC)
- Head coach: Donald Hill-Eley (7th season)
- Offensive coordinator: Chennis Berry (3rd season)
- Defensive coordinator: Alonzo Lee (3rd season)
- Home stadium: Hughes Stadium

2008 Mid-Eastern Athletic Conference football standings
	Conf.			Overall
Team	W		L	W		L
No. 13 South Carolina State $^	8	–	0	10	–	2
Florida A&M	5	–	3	9	–	3
Bethune–Cookman	5	–	3	8	–	3
Hampton	5	–	3	6	–	5
Delaware State	5	–	3	5	–	6
Morgan State	4	–	4	6	–	6
Norfolk State	3	–	5	5	–	7
North Carolina A&T	1	–	7	3	–	9
Howard	0	–	8	1	–	10
Winston-Salem State *	0	–	0	3	–	8
$ – Conference champion; ^ – FCS playoff participant; * – Ineligible for conference championship; Rankings from The Sports Network poll

The 2008 Morgan State Bears football team represented of the Morgan State University during the 2008 NCAA Division I FCS football season as a member of the Mid-Eastern Athletic Conference (MEAC). This was the seventh season under the guidance of head coach Donald Hill-Eley. The team finished the season at 6–6 overall and 4–4 in the MEAC, losing its final three games of the season.

== Schedule ==
Date	Time	Opponent	Site	TV	Result	Attendance	Source
September 6	6:00 p.m.	at Towson*	Johnny Unitas Stadium; Towson, MD (rivalry)		L 16–21	4,705	
September 13	4:00 p.m.	North Carolina Central*	Hughes Stadium; Baltimore, MD		W 49–7	5,632	
September 20	6:00 p.m.	at Winston-Salem State	Bowman Gray Stadium; Winston-Salem, NC		W 21–7	3,066	
September 27	3:30 p.m.	Rutgers*	Rutgers Stadium; New Brunswick, NJ	ESPN360	L 0–38	42,411	
October 4	4:00 p.m.	Bethune–Cookman	Hughes Stadium; Baltimore, MD		L 27–31	4,389	
October 11	1:30 p.m.	at North Carolina A&T	Aggie Stadium; Greensboro, NC		W 41–3	21,500	
October 18	1:00 p.m.	at Howard	William H. Greene Stadium; Washington, DC (rivalry)		W 31–30 ^{2OT}	6,853	
October 25	1:00 p.m.	Delaware State	Hughes Stadium; Baltimore, MD		W 20–3	6,312	
November 1	3:00 p.m.	at Florida A&M	Bragg Memorial Stadium; Tallahassee, FL		W 13–10	16,205	
November 8	5:00 p.m.	at Norfolk State	William "Dick" Price Stadium; Norfolk, VA		L 9–35	5,812	
November 15	4:00 p.m.	No. 15 South Carolina State	Hughes Stadium; Baltimore, MD		L 0–32	512	
November 22	1:00 p.m.	Hampton	Hughes Stadium; Baltimore, MD		L 13–17	2,145	
*Non-conference game; Rankings from The Sports Network Poll released prior to the game; All times are in Eastern time

== Game summaries ==
=== Towson ===
	1	2	3	4	Total
Morgan State	2	14	0	0	16
Towson	7	0	14	0	21

The Towson Tigers rallied to beat Morgan State 21–16. Devan James ran for a career-high 178 yards on 33 carries.

Towson improved to 16–5 all-time against Morgan State as quarterback Sean Schaefer threw three touchdowns and became Towson's all-time passing yardage record holder surpassing the 8,900 career passing yards set by Dan Crowley (1991–94).

=== North Carolina Central ===
	1	2	3	4	Total
North Carolina Central	0	0	0	7	7
Morgan State	7	28	7	7	49

=== Winston-Salem State ===
	1	2	3	4	Total
Morgan State	7	7	0	7	21
Winston-Salem	0	0	0	7	7

=== Rutgers ===
	1	2	3	4	Total
Morgan State	0	0	0	0	0
Rutgers	21	17	0	0	38

Morgan State only managed 109 yards and saw its two-game winning streak snapped in a 38–0 loss to Rutgers.

=== Bethune–Cookman ===
	1	2	3	4	Total
Morgan State	0	13	14	0	27
Bethune–Cookman	14	3	14	0	31

Morgan State had 312 yards of total offense, but Bethune-Cookman scored twice off turnovers and beat the Bears 31–27. Devan James ran for 113 yards on 22 carries and a touchdown in the second quarter.

The Bears got as close as four points after QB Carlton Jackson threw a 27-yard touchdown to Edwin Baptiste, but James Meade's extra point attempt was blocked by the Wildcats. Jackson recovered a fumble in the end zone in the second quarter for a touchdown.

Bethune-Cookman had 213 total offensive yards, but only two first downs in the second half.

The Bears fall to 2–3 overall and 1–1 in the MEAC. The Wildcats improved to 4–1 overall and 2–1 in the MEAC.

=== North Carolina A&T ===
	1	2	3	4	Total
Morgan State	10	0	24	7	41
North Carolina A&T	0	3	0	0	3

The Bears () led 10–3 at halftime, but scored 24-points in the third-quarter to pull away from North Carolina A&T University in a 41–3 victory. Devan James rushed for 103 yards and Mario Melton rushed for 97 yards as the Bears improved to 3–3 overall and 1–1 in the Mid-Eastern Athletic Conference. The Aggies fell to 2–5 overall and 0–3 in the conference.

=== Howard ===
	1	2	3	4	OT	2OT	Total
Morgan State	7	3	0	7	7	7	31
Howard	0	0	14	3	7	6	30

Keith Lee scored on a 3-yard run in the second overtime as Morgan State beat Howard University, 31–30. Devan James rushed for two touchdowns and 219 yards (36 carries) Lee finished with 29 yards (8 carries) as the Bears improved to 4–3 overall and 2–1 in the Mid-Eastern Athletic Conference.

=== Delaware State ===
	1	2	3	4	Total
Delaware State	3	0	0	0	3
Morgan State	7	3	0	10	20

Devan James scored two touchdowns and ran for a total of 103 yards in a 20–3 victory over Delaware State University. The Bears forced the Hornets into four turnovers.

=== Florida A&M ===
	1	2	3	4	Total
Morgan State	3	7	0	3	13
Florida A&M	0	7	3	0	10

Morgan State capped an 11-play, 41-yard drive with a 39-yard field goal with 16 seconds left for a 13–10 win over Florida A&M. It was the Bears fourth consecutive victory.

Morgan State improved to 6–3 overall and 4–1 in the Mid-Eastern Athletic Conference)

=== Norfolk State ===
	1	2	3	4	Total
Morgan State	0	0	3	6	9
Norfolk State	7	7	7	14	35

=== South Carolina State ===
	1	2	3	4	Total
South Carolina State	6	12	7	7	32
Morgan State	0	0	0	0	0

=== Hampton ===
	1	2	3	4	Total
Hampton	0	10	0	7	17
Morgan State	3	7	0	3	13
