= 2008 Southern Jaguars football team =

American college football season

2008 Southern Jaguars football
- Conference: Southwestern Athletic Conference
- West Division
- Record: 6–5 (6–2 SWAC)
- Head coach: Pete Richardson (16th season)
- Defensive coordinator: Terrence Graves (5th season)
- Home stadium: A. W. Mumford Stadium

2008 Southwestern Athletic Conference football standings
	Conf.			Overall
Team	W		L	W		L
East Division
Jackson State xy	6	–	1	7	–	5
Alabama A&M	4	–	3	5	–	7
Alabama State	2	–	5	3	–	8
Mississippi Valley State	1	–	6	3	–	8
Alcorn State	1	–	6	2	–	10
West Division
Grambling State xy$	7	–	0	11	–	2
Prairie View A&M	6	–	1	9	–	1
Southern	5	–	2	6	–	5
Arkansas–Pine Bluff	2	–	5	3	–	9
Texas Southern	1	–	6	4	–	8
Championship: Grambling State 41, Jackson State 9
$ – Conference champion; x – Division champion/co-champions; y – Championship game participant

The 2008 Southern Jaguars football team represented Southern University as a member of the Southwestern Athletic Conference (SWAC) during the 2008 NCAA Division I FCS football season. Led by 16th-year head coach Pete Richardson, the Jaguars compiled an overall record of 6–5, with a conference record of 6–2, and finished and finished third in the SWAC West Division.

== Schedule ==
Date	Opponent	Site	Result	Attendance	Source
August 30	at Houston*	Robertson Stadium; Houston, TX	L 3–55	26,555	
September 6	at Tennessee State*	LP Field; Nashville, TN (John Merritt Classic)	L 32–34	28,830	
September 13	Mississippi Valley State	A. W. Mumford Stadium; Baton Rouge, LA	W 49–7		
September 27	at Alcorn State	Jack Spinks Stadium; Lorman, MS	W 15–12		
October 4	at Jackson State	Mississippi Veterans Memorial Stadium; Jackson, MS (rivalry)	W 35–28	42,513	
October 11	Texas Southern	A. W. Mumford Stadium; Baton Rouge, LA	W 45–14		
October 18	Florida A&M*	A. W. Mumford Stadium; Baton Rouge, LA	L 49–52	15,107	
October 25	at Prairie View A&M	Reliant Stadium; Houston, TX	L 23–24		
November 1	Arkansas–Pine Bluff	A. W. Mumford Stadium; Baton Rouge, LA	W 31–24 ^{2OT}		
November 15	vs. Alabama State	Ladd–Peebles Stadium; Mobile, AL (Gulf Coast Classic)	W 15–0	25,387	
November 29	vs. Grambling State	Louisiana Superdome; New Orleans, LA (Bayou Classic)	L 14–29	59,874	
*Non-conference game
