= 2008 North Carolina A&T Aggies football team =

American college football season

2008 North Carolina A&T Aggies football
- Conference: Mid-Eastern Athletic Conference
- Record: 3–9 (1–7 MEAC)
- Head coach: Lee Fobbs (3rd season; Games 1–8); George Ragsdale (Interim, Games 9–12)
- Home stadium: Aggie Stadium

2008 Mid-Eastern Athletic Conference football standings
	Conf.			Overall
Team	W		L	W		L
No. 13 South Carolina State $^	8	–	0	10	–	2
Florida A&M	5	–	3	9	–	3
Bethune–Cookman	5	–	3	8	–	3
Hampton	5	–	3	6	–	5
Delaware State	5	–	3	5	–	6
Morgan State	4	–	4	6	–	6
Norfolk State	3	–	5	5	–	7
North Carolina A&T	1	–	7	3	–	9
Howard	0	–	8	1	–	10
Winston-Salem State *	0	–	0	3	–	8
$ – Conference champion; ^ – FCS playoff participant; * – Ineligible for conference championship; Rankings from The Sports Network poll

The 2008 North Carolina A&T Aggies football team represented North Carolina A&T State University as a member of the Mid-Eastern Athletic Conference (MEAC) during the 2008 NCAA Division I FCS football season. The Aggies compiled an overall record of 3–9, with a mark of 1–7 in conference play, and finished eighth in the MEAC.

Lee Fobbs served as North Carolina A&T's head coach for the first eight games of the 2008 season before he was fired. George Ragsdale was appointed interim head coach and led the Aggies for the remainder of the season.

== Schedule ==
Date	Opponent	Site	Result	Attendance	Source
August 30	Johnson C. Smith*	Aggie Stadium; Greensboro, NC	W 44–12	11,552	
September 6	Winston-Salem State	Aggie Stadium; Greensboro, NC (rivalry)	W 14–8	21,500	
September 13	at Norfolk State	William "Dick" Price Stadium; Norfolk, VA	L 21–27	12,632	
September 20	at Hampton	Armstrong Stadium; Hampton, VA	L 7–44	5,103	
September 27	Coastal Carolina*	Aggie Stadium; Greensboro, NC	L 7–20	2,062	
October 4	vs. North Carolina Central*	American Legion Memorial Stadium; Charlotte, NC (rivalry)	L 27–28	20,180	
October 11	Morgan State^{†}	Aggie Stadium; Greensboro, NC	L 3–41	21,500	
October 18	at Delaware State	Alumni Stadium; Dover, DE	L 7–42	6,089	
October 25	Howard	Aggie Stadium; Greensboro, NC	W 21–20	4,358	
November 1	at Bethune–Cookman	Municipal Stadium; Daytona Beach, FL	L 14–24	3,145	
November 8	Florida A&M	Aggie Stadium; Greensboro, NC	L 7–45	7,036	
November 22	No. 15 South Carolina State	Aggie Stadium; Greensboro, NC (rivalry)	L 0–55	7,343	
*Non-conference game; ^{†}Homecoming; Rankings from The Sports Network Poll released prior to the game
