= 2008 Arkansas–Pine Bluff Golden Lions football team =

American college football season

2008 Arkansas–Pine Bluff Golden Lions football
- Conference: Southwestern Athletic Conference
- West Division
- Record: 3–9 (2–6 SWAC)
- Head coach: Monte Coleman (1st season)
- Home stadium: Golden Lion Stadium

2008 Southwestern Athletic Conference football standings
	Conf.			Overall
Team	W		L	W		L
East Division
Jackson State xy	6	–	1	7	–	5
Alabama A&M	4	–	3	5	–	7
Alabama State	2	–	5	3	–	8
Mississippi Valley State	1	–	6	3	–	8
Alcorn State	1	–	6	2	–	10
West Division
Grambling State xy$	7	–	0	11	–	2
Prairie View A&M	6	–	1	9	–	1
Southern	5	–	2	6	–	5
Arkansas–Pine Bluff	2	–	5	3	–	9
Texas Southern	1	–	6	4	–	8
Championship: Grambling State 41, Jackson State 9
$ – Conference champion; x – Division champion/co-champions; y – Championship game participant

The 2008 Arkansas–Pine Bluff Golden Lions football team represented the University of Arkansas at Pine Bluff as a member of the Southwestern Athletic Conference (SWAC) during the 2008 NCAA Division I FCS football season. Led by first-year head coach Monte Coleman, the Golden Lions compiled an overall record of 3–9, with a mark of 2–6 in conference play, and finished fourth in the SWAC West Division.

== Schedule ==
Date	Time	Opponent	Site	Result	Attendance	Source
August 30		Arkansas–Monticello*	Golden Lion Stadium; Pine Bluff, AR	L 7–21		
September 6		at Henderson State*	Carpenter–Haygood Stadium; Arkadelphia, AR	L 0–34		
September 13	6:00 pm	vs. No. 19 Central Arkansas*	War Memorial Stadium; Little Rock, AR	L 17–41	4,823	
September 18		at Alcorn State	Jack Spinks Stadium; Lorman, MS	L 3–13		
September 27	6:00 p.m.	Alabama A&M	Golden Lion Stadium; Pine Bluff, AR	L 17–23	8,513	
October 11		Jackson State	Golden Lion Stadium; Pine Bluff, AR	L 10–21	10,600	
October 18		Prairie View A&M	Golden Lion Stadium; Pine Bluff, AR	L 0–15		
October 25		Lincoln (MO)*	Golden Lion Stadium; Pine Bluff, AR	W 42–0		
November 1		at Southern	A. W. Mumford Stadium; Baton Rouge, LA	L 24–31 ^{2OT}		
November 8		vs. Grambling State	War Memorial Stadium; Little Rock, AR (Delta Classic)	L 7–28	15,500	
November 15		Mississippi Valley State	Golden Lion Stadium; Pine Bluff, AR	W 34–0		
November 29		vs. Texas Southern	Cotton Bowl; Dallas, TX	W 28–7		
*Non-conference game; Rankings from The Sports Network Poll released prior to the game; All times are in Central time
