= 2008 Hampton Pirates football team =

American college football season

2008 Hampton Pirates football
- Conference: Mid-Eastern Athletic Conference
- Record: 6–5 (5–3 MEAC)
- Head coach: Jerry Holmes (1st season)
- Home stadium: Armstrong Stadium

2008 Mid-Eastern Athletic Conference football standings
| | Conf. | | | Overall |
| Team | W | | L | W | | L |
|---|---|---|---|---|---|---|
| No. 13 South Carolina State $^ | 8 | – | 0 | 10 | – | 2 |
| Florida A&M | 5 | – | 3 | 9 | – | 3 |
| Bethune–Cookman | 5 | – | 3 | 8 | – | 3 |
| Hampton | 5 | – | 3 | 6 | – | 5 |
| Delaware State | 5 | – | 3 | 5 | – | 6 |
| Morgan State | 4 | – | 4 | 6 | – | 6 |
| Norfolk State | 3 | – | 5 | 5 | – | 7 |
| North Carolina A&T | 1 | – | 7 | 3 | – | 9 |
| Howard | 0 | – | 8 | 1 | – | 10 |
| Winston-Salem State * | 0 | – | 0 | 3 | – | 8 |
$ – Conference champion; ^ – FCS playoff participant; * – Ineligible for conference championship; Rankings from The Sports Network poll

The 2008 Hampton Pirates football team represented Hampton University as a member of the Mid-Eastern Athletic Conference (MEAC) during the 2008 NCAA Division I FCS football season. Led by first-year head coach Jerry Holmes, the Pirates compiled an overall record of 6–5, with a mark of 5–3 in conference play, and finished tied for second in the MEAC.

== Schedule ==
| Date | Opponent | Rank | Site | Result | Attendance | Source |
|---|---|---|---|---|---|---|
| August 31 | vs. Jackson State* | | Florida Citrus Bowl; Orlando, FL (MEAC/SWAC Challenge) | W 17–13 | 10,723 | |
| September 6 | at No. 12 Southern Illinois* | | McAndrew Stadium; Carbondale, IL | L 31–37 | 10,051 | |
| September 13 | Howard | | Armstrong Stadium; Hampton, VA (rivalry) | W 38–27 | | |
| September 20 | North Carolina A&T | | Armstrong Stadium; Hampton, VA | W 44–7 | 5,103 | |
| October 4 | at Delaware State | | Alumni Stadium; Dover, DE | W 17–14 | 5,218 | |
| October 18 | Norfolk State | No. 25 | Armstrong Stadium; Hampton, VA (rivalry) | W 35–17 | 12,034 | |
| October 25 | at South Carolina State | No. 22 | Oliver C. Dawson Stadium; Orangeburg, SC | L 13–35 | 17,159 | |
| November 1 | Winston-Salem State | | Armstrong Stadium; Hampton, VA | L 30–35 | 14,877 | |
| November 8 | Bethune–Cookman | | Armstrong Stadium; Hampton, VA | L 6–17 | 1,270 | |
| November 15 | at Florida A&M | | Bragg Memorial Stadium; Tallahassee, FL | L 24–45 | 9,711 | |
| November 22 | at Morgan State | | Hughes Stadium; Baltimore, MD | W 17–13 | 2,145 | |
*Non-conference game; Rankings from The Sports Network Poll released prior to the game
