= 2008 Winston-Salem State Rams football team =

American college football season

2008 Winston-Salem State Rams football
- Conference: Mid-Eastern Athletic Conference
- Record: 3–8 (0–0 MEAC)
- Head coach: Kermit Blount (16th season)
- Home stadium: Bowman Gray Stadium

2008 Mid-Eastern Athletic Conference football standings
	Conf.			Overall
Team	W		L	W		L
No. 13 South Carolina State $^	8	–	0	10	–	2
Florida A&M	5	–	3	9	–	3
Bethune–Cookman	5	–	3	8	–	3
Hampton	5	–	3	6	–	5
Delaware State	5	–	3	5	–	6
Morgan State	4	–	4	6	–	6
Norfolk State	3	–	5	5	–	7
North Carolina A&T	1	–	7	3	–	9
Howard	0	–	8	1	–	10
Winston-Salem State *	0	–	0	3	–	8
$ – Conference champion; ^ – FCS playoff participant; * – Ineligible for conference championship; Rankings from The Sports Network poll

The 2008 Winston-Salem State Rams football team represented Winston-Salem State University as a member of the Mid-Eastern Athletic Conference (MEAC) during the 2008 NCAA Division I FCS football season. Led by 16th-year head coach Kermit Blount, the Rams compiled an overall record of 3–8.

== Schedule ==
Date	Opponent	Site	Result	Attendance	Source
September 6	at North Carolina A&T*	Aggie Stadium; Greensboro, NC (rivalry)	L 8–14	21,500	
September 13	Savannah State*	Bowman Gray Stadium; Winston-Salem, NC	L 13–16	5,112	
September 20	Morgan State*	Bowman Gray Stadium; Winston-Salem, NC	L 7–21	3,066	
September 27	South Carolina State*	Bowman Gray Stadium; Winston-Salem, NC	L 17–43		
October 4	Howard*	Bowman Gray Stadium; Winston-Salem, NC	W 34–10	5,107	
October 9	at Florida A&M*	Bragg Memorial Stadium; Tallahassee, FL	L 0–23	15,448	
October 25	Bethune–Cookman*	Bowman Gray Stadium; Winston-Salem, NC	L 6–27	12,121	
November 1	Hampton*	Armstrong Stadium; Hampton, VA	W 35–30	14,877	
November 8	Delaware State*	Alumni Stadium; Dover, DE	W 24–23	891	
November 15	at North Carolina Central*	O'Kelly–Riddick Stadium; Durham, NC	L 16–23	6,294	
November 22	Norfolk State*	Bowman Gray Stadium; Winston-Salem, NC	L 14–17	1,428	
*Non-conference game
