= Delmar Stadium =

Stadium in Houston, Texas, US

Coordinates: 29°48′13″N 95°27′22″W

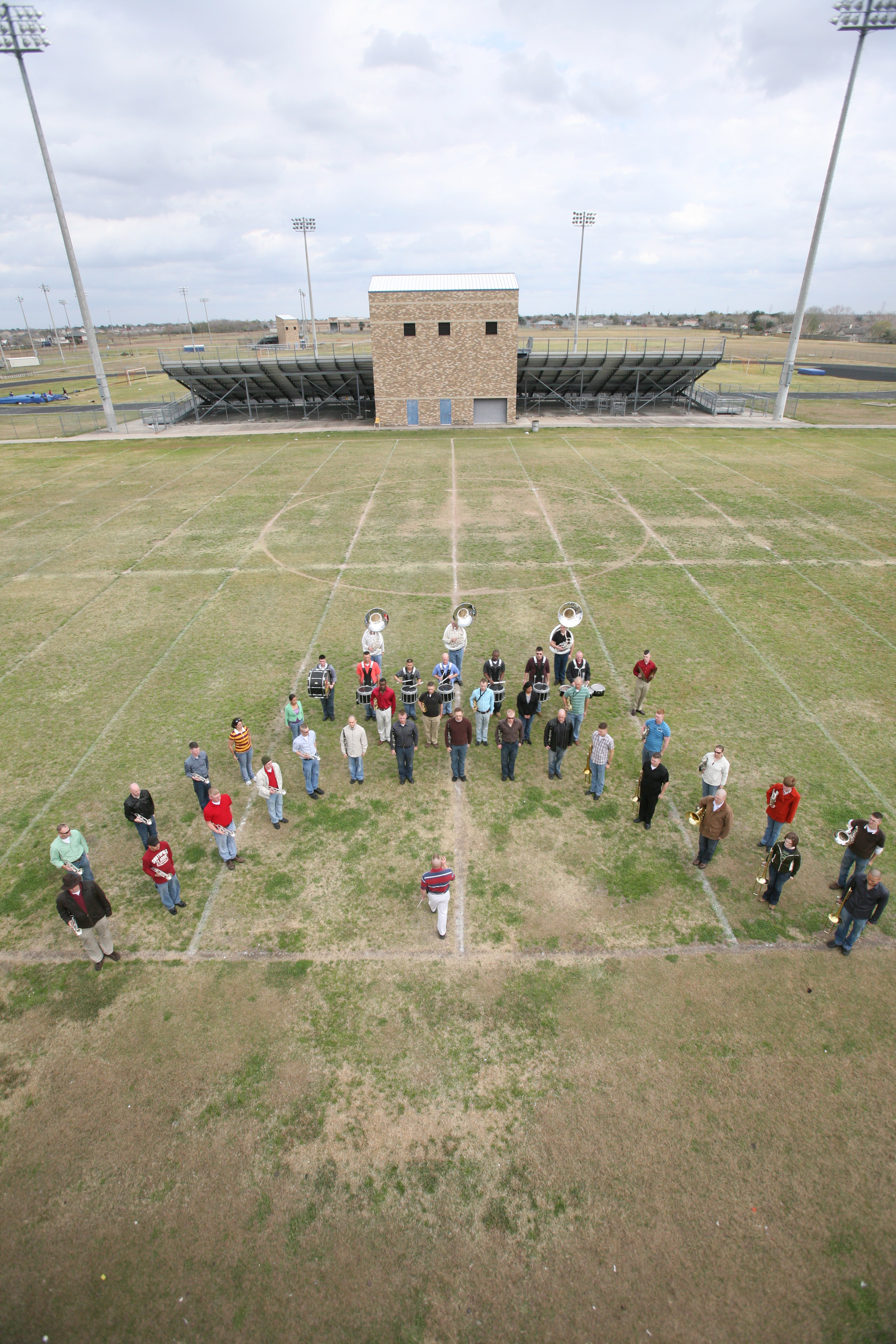
- Interactive map of Delmar Stadium
- Full name: James M. Delmar Stadium
- Location: 2020 Mangum Road; Houston, Texas 77092
- Owner: Houston Independent School District
- Operator: Houston Independent School District
- Capacity: 12,000
- Surface: Artificial Turf

Construction
- Opened: 1957

Tenants
- Houston Independent School District (1957–present); Texas Southern University (SWAC) (2008, 2011); Space City Classic (2010–present); Houston SaberCats (MLR) (2018–2019)

Delmar Stadium is a 12,000-seat stadium located at 1900 Mangum Road in Houston, Texas, United States. It is primarily used for American football games of Houston Independent School District schools. It is a part of the Delmar-Tusa Sports complex includes a 5,000-seat basketball/volleyball arena, Delmar Fieldhouse, a 6,000-seat rugby/football/soccer/track venue, Dyer Stadium, a 3,000-seat football/soccer field, Delmar Jr. Field, and a 1,500-seat baseball stadium, Absher Field.

Delmar Stadium was constructed in 1959 for just under $12.9 million. After severe flooding in May 2015 rendered the field unsuitable for play, artificial turf was installed later that year.

In 1974, the Minnesota Vikings used Delmar Stadium as their practice facility in preparation for Super Bowl VIII, which was played at Rice Stadium.

Delmar was also the primary home field of the Texas Southern University Tigers football team for a few years. Texas Southern played several games there from 2008 to 2011.

On March 13, 2010, Delmar Stadium hosted the third annual Space City Classic high school senior all-star football game. Organizers intend to keep the Space City Classic at Delmar in the future.

On July 22, 2011, Trae Day, in honor of rapper Trae tha Truth, was hosted for its 4th year.

The stadium was used as a filming site in the 1998 movie Rushmore, for the scene where Max is flying a kite and meets Margaret.

In 2019, the Houston Sabercats, returned to play a professional rugby game at the stadium when the pitch at their new purpose built rugby stadium was not deemed playable following their soft opening.

== See also ==
- Delmar Fieldhouse
- Trae
