= 2008 Samford Bulldogs football team =

American college football season

2008 Samford Bulldogs football
- Conference: Southern Conference
- Record: 6–5 (4–4 SoCon)
- Head coach: Pat Sullivan (2nd season)
- Offensive coordinator: Steve Brickey (2nd season)
- Defensive coordinator: Bill D'Ottavio (2nd season)
- Home stadium: Seibert Stadium

2008 Southern Conference football standings
| | Conf. | | | Overall |
| Team | W | | L | W | | L |
|---|---|---|---|---|---|---|
| No. 5 Appalachian State $^ | 8 | – | 0 | 11 | – | 3 |
| No. 9 Wofford ^ | 7 | – | 1 | 9 | – | 3 |
| No. 17 Elon | 6 | – | 2 | 8 | – | 4 |
| Furman | 4 | – | 4 | 7 | – | 5 |
| Samford | 4 | – | 4 | 6 | – | 5 |
| Georgia Southern | 4 | – | 4 | 6 | – | 5 |
| The Citadel | 2 | – | 6 | 4 | – | 8 |
| Western Carolina | 1 | – | 7 | 3 | – | 9 |
| Chattanooga | 0 | – | 8 | 1 | – | 11 |
$ – Conference champion; ^ – FCS playoff participant; Rankings from The Sports Network FCS Poll

The 2008 Samford Bulldogs football team represented Samford University as a member of the Southern Conference (SoCon) during the 2008 NCAA Division I FCS football season. Led by second-year head coach Pat Sullivan, the Bulldogs compiled an overall record of 6–5, with a mark of 4–4 in conference play, and finished tied for fourth in the SoCon. The team played home games at Seibert Stadium in Homewood, Alabama.

== Schedule ==
| Date | Time | Opponent | Site | TV | Result | Attendance | Source |
|---|---|---|---|---|---|---|---|
| August 28 | 7:00 p.m. | West Georgia* | Seibert Stadium; Homewood, AL | | W 21–19 | 8,240 | |
| September 6 | 6:00 p.m. | Faulkner* | Seibert Stadium; Homewood, AL | | W 62–0 | 6,272 | |
| September 13 | 6:00 p.m. | at Ole Miss* | Vaught–Hemingway Stadium; Oxford, MS | | L 10–34 | 52,780 | |
| September 27 | 12:30 p.m. | at No. 8 Elon | Rhodes Stadium; Elon, NC | | L 17–23 | 11,149 | |
| October 4 | 12:00 p.m. | at Western Carolina | E. J. Whitmire Stadium; Cullowhee, NC | | W 21–6 | 9,174 | |
| October 11 | 2:30 p.m. | No. 2 Appalachian State | Seibert Stadium; Homewood, AL | | L 24–35 | 10,670 | |
| October 25 | 2:00 p.m. | The Citadel^{†} | Seibert Stadium; Homewood, AL | | W 28–10 | 8,453 | |
| November 1 | 2:00 p.m. | No. 18 Furman | Seibert Stadium; Homewood, AL | | L 27–28 | 5,773 | |
| November 8 | 11:00 a.m. | at Georgia Southern | Paulson Stadium; Statesboro, GA | CSS | W 27–17 | 17,436 | |
| November 15 | 2:00 p.m. | No. 9 Wofford | Seibert Stadium; Homewood, AL | | L 7–28 | 2,973 | |
| November 22 | 1:00 p.m. | at Chattanooga | Finley Stadium; Chattanooga, TN | | W 30–7 | 4,068 | |
*Non-conference game; ^{†}Homecoming; Rankings from The Sports Network Poll released prior to the game; All times are in Central time
