= 2008 Robert Morris Colonials football team =

American college football season

2008 Robert Morris Colonials football
- Conference: Northeast Conference
- Record: 5–6 (4–3 NEC)
- Head coach: Joe Walton (15th season)
- Defensive coordinator: Scott Farison (1st season)
- Home stadium: Joe Walton Stadium

2008 Northeast Conference football standings
	Conf.			Overall
Team	W		L	W		L
Albany $	7	–	0	9	–	3
Monmouth	6	–	1	7	–	5
Sacred Heart	4	–	3	8	–	3
Central Connecticut State	4	–	3	7	–	4
Robert Morris	4	–	3	5	–	6
Duquesne	2	–	5	3	–	7
Wagner	1	–	6	3	–	8
Saint Francis (PA)	0	–	7	0	–	11
$ – Conference champion

The 2008 Robert Morris Colonials football team represented Robert Morris University in the 2008 NCAA Division I FCS football season. The Colonials were led by 15th-year head coach Joe Walton and played their home games at Joe Walton Stadium. They were a member of the Northeast Conference.

== Schedule ==
Date	Opponent	Site	Result	Attendance	Source
September 6	Morehead State*	Joe Walton Stadium; Moon Township, PA	W 27–13	1,763	
September 13	Bucknell*	Joe Walton Stadium; Moon Township, PA	L 14–17	2,347	
September 20	at Dayton*	Welcome Stadium; Dayton, OH	L 14–31	3,595	
September 27	Monmouth	Joe Walton Stadium; Moon Township, PA	L 26–34	1,553	
October 4	at Sacred Heart	Campus Field; Fairfield, CT	L 28–31	3,019	
October 11	Duquesne	Joe Walton Stadium; Moon Township, PA	W 34–27	3,942	
October 18	at Bryant*	Bulldog Stadium; Smithfield, RI	L 7–20	5,630	
October 25	at Wagner	Wagner College Stadium; Staten Island, NY	W 35–3	1,013	
November 1	Central Connecticut State	Joe Walton Stadium; Moon Township, PA	W 27–14	1,078	
November 8	Albany	Joe Walton Stadium; Moon Township, PA	L 7–41	1,021	
November 15	at Saint Francis	DeGol Field; Loretto, PA	W 35–20	943	
*Non-conference game
