= 2008 The Citadel Bulldogs football team =

American college football season

2008 The Citadel Bulldogs football
- Conference: Southern Conference
- Record: 4–8 (2–6 SoCon)
- Head coach: Kevin Higgins (4th season)
- Offensive coordinator: Dave Cecchini (2nd season)
- Defensive coordinator: Isaac Collins (3rd season)
- Home stadium: Johnson Hagood Stadium

2008 Southern Conference football standings
	Conf.			Overall
Team	W		L	W		L
No. 5 Appalachian State $^	8	–	0	11	–	3
No. 9 Wofford ^	7	–	1	9	–	3
No. 17 Elon	6	–	2	8	–	4
Furman	4	–	4	7	–	5
Samford	4	–	4	6	–	5
Georgia Southern	4	–	4	6	–	5
The Citadel	2	–	6	4	–	8
Western Carolina	1	–	7	3	–	9
Chattanooga	0	–	8	1	–	11
$ – Conference champion; ^ – FCS playoff participant; Rankings from The Sports Network FCS Poll

The 2008 The Citadel Bulldogs football team represented The Citadel, The Military College of South Carolina in the 2008 NCAA Division I FCS football season. Kevin Higgins served as head coach for the fourth season. The Bulldogs played as members of the Southern Conference and played home games at Johnson Hagood Stadium.

== Schedule ==
Date	Time	Opponent	Rank	Site	TV	Result	Attendance	Source
August 30	7:00 pm	Webber International*	No. 23	Johnson Hagood Stadium; Charleston, SC	BI	W 54–7	11,247	
September 6	3:30 pm	at Clemson*	No. 20	Memorial Stadium; Clemson, SC	ESPN360	L 17–45	76,794	
September 20	1:00 pm	Princeton*	No. 21	Johnson Hagood Stadium; Charleston, SC		W 37–24	13,120	
September 27	1:00 pm	Western Carolina	No. 13	Johnson Hagood Stadium; Charleston, SC		W 34–14	11,216	
October 4	3:00 pm	at No. 2 Appalachian State	No. 12	Kidd Brewer Stadium; Boone, NC	SSN	L 21–47	29,631	
October 11	2:00 pm	No. 6 Elon	No. 21	Johnson Hagood Stadium; Charleston, SC	BI	L 23–27	12,582	
October 18	2:00 pm	at No. 19 Furman	No. 24	Paladin Stadium; Greenville, SC (rivalry)		L 20–34	9,644	
October 25	2:00 pm	at Samford		Seibert Stadium; Homewood, AL		L 10–28	8,453	
November 1	1:00 pm	Georgia Southern		Johnson Hagood Stadium; Charleston, SC	BI	L 41–44 ^{3OT}	11,190	
November 8	3:00 pm	at No. 10 Wofford		Gibbs Stadium; Spartanburg, SC (rivalry)	SSN	L 28–33	10,011	
November 15	2:00 pm	Chattanooga^{†}		Johnson Hagood Stadium; Charleston, SC	BI	W 24–21	14,213	
November 22	1:30 pm	at No. 3 (FBS) Florida*		Ben Hill Griffin Stadium; Gainesville, FL	PPV	L 19–70	90,374	
*Non-conference game; ^{†}Homecoming; Rankings from The Sports Network Poll released prior to the game; All times are in Eastern time

== Ranking movements ==
Ranking movements Legend: ██ Increase in ranking ██ Decrease in ranking — = Not ranked RV = Received votes
	Week													
Poll	Pre	1	2	3	4	5	6	7	8	9	10	11	12	Final
Sports Network	23	20	22	21	13	12	21	24	RV	—	—	—	—	—
Coaches' Poll	23	23	22	22	24	20	25	RV	—	—	—	—	—	—
