= 2008 Elon Phoenix football team =

American college football season

2008 Elon Phoenix football
- Conference: Southern Conference

Ranking
- Sports Network: No. 17
- Record: 8–4 (6–2 SoCon)
- Head coach: Pete Lembo (3rd season)
- Defensive coordinator: Jay Bateman (3rd season)
- Home stadium: Rhodes Stadium

2008 Southern Conference football standings
	Conf.			Overall
Team	W		L	W		L
No. 5 Appalachian State $^	8	–	0	11	–	3
No. 9 Wofford ^	7	–	1	9	–	3
No. 17 Elon	6	–	2	8	–	4
Furman	4	–	4	7	–	5
Samford	4	–	4	6	–	5
Georgia Southern	4	–	4	6	–	5
The Citadel	2	–	6	4	–	8
Western Carolina	1	–	7	3	–	9
Chattanooga	0	–	8	1	–	11
$ – Conference champion; ^ – FCS playoff participant; Rankings from The Sports Network FCS Poll

The 2008 Elon Phoenix football team was an American football team that represented Elon University as a member of the Southern Conference (SoCon) during the 2008 NCAA Division I FCS football season. Led by third-year head coach Pete Lembo, the Phoenix compiled an overall record of 8–4, with a mark of 6–2 in conference play, and finished third in the SoCon.

== Schedule ==
Date	Time	Opponent	Rank	Site	TV	Result	Attendance	Source
August 30	7:00 p.m.	No. 4 Richmond*	No. 15	Rhodes Stadium; Elon, NC		L 10–28	10,847	
September 6	3:00 p.m.	at Stony Brook*	No. 17	Kenneth P. LaValle Stadium; Stony Brook, NY		W 30–20	1,806	
September 13	6:00 p.m.	Presbyterian*	No. 18	Rhodes Stadium; Elon, NC		W 66–12	7,232	
September 20	7:00 p.m.	at No. 14 Georgia Southern	No. 18	Paulson Stadium; Statesboro, GA	CSS	W 22–20	17,049	
September 27	1:30 p.m.	Samford	No. 8	Rhodes Stadium; Elon, NC		W 23–17	11,149	
October 4	1:30 p.m.	No. 15 Furman	No. 7	Rhodes Stadium; Elon, NC		W 31–10	7,469	
October 11	2:00 p.m.	at No. 21 The Citadel	No. 6	Johnson Hagood Stadium; Charleston, SC	BI	W 27–23	12,582	
October 18	2:00 p.m.	at Chattanooga	No. 3	Finley Stadium; Chattanooga, TN		W 42–7	4,505	
October 25	3:00 p.m.	No. 4 Wofford	No. 3	Rhodes Stadium; Elon, NC		L 20–55	7,874	
November 8	1:30 p.m.	Western Carolina^{†}	No. 11	Rhodes Stadium; Elon, NC		W 33–14	10,747	
November 15	3:30 p.m.	at No. 2 Appalachian State	No. 11	Kidd Brewer Stadium; Boone, NC		L 16–24	24,831	
November 22	1:00 p.m.	at No. 20 Liberty*	No. 14	Williams Stadium; Lynchburg, VA		L 3–26	7,751	
*Non-conference game; ^{†}Homecoming; Rankings from The Sports Network Poll released prior to the game; All times are in Eastern time
