= 2008 Albany Great Danes football team =

American college football season

2008 Albany Great Danes football

NEC champion

Gridiron Classic, W 28–0 vs. Jacksonville
- Conference: Northeast Conference
- Record: 9–3 (7–0 NEC)
- Head coach: Bob Ford (39th season)
- Offensive coordinator: Ryan McCarthy (1st season)
- Defensive coordinator: Mike Simpson (22nd season)
- Home stadium: University Field

2008 Northeast Conference football standings
	Conf.			Overall
Team	W		L	W		L
Albany $	7	–	0	9	–	3
Monmouth	6	–	1	7	–	5
Sacred Heart	4	–	3	8	–	3
Central Connecticut State	4	–	3	7	–	4
Robert Morris	4	–	3	5	–	6
Duquesne	2	–	5	3	–	7
Wagner	1	–	6	3	–	8
Saint Francis (PA)	0	–	7	0	–	11
$ – Conference champion

The 2008 Albany Great Danes football team represented the University at Albany, SUNY as a member of the Northeast Conference (NEC) during the 2008 NCAA Division I FCS football season. Led by 39-year head coach Bob Ford, the Great Danes compiled an overall record of 9–3 with a mark of 7–0 in conference play, winning the NEC. Albany represented the NEC in the Gridiron Classic, winning against Jacksonville, champion of the Pioneer Football League (PFL). The team played home games at University Field in Albany New York.

== Schedule ==
Date	Time	Opponent	Site	TV	Result	Attendance	Source
August 30	6:00 pm	at No. 5 UMass*	McGuirk Stadium; Hadley, MA		L 16–28	15,112	
September 13	7:00 pm	at Hofstra*	James M. Shuart Stadium; Hempstead, NY		W 22–16 ^{OT}	5,111	
September 20	12:00 pm	at No. 10 New Hampshire*	Cowell Stadium; Durham, NH		L 24–32	7,215	
September 27	6:00 pm	at No. 17 Delaware*	Delaware Stadium; Newark, DE		L 7–38	22,196	
October 4	1:00 pm	at Duquesne	Rooney Field; Pittsburgh, PA		W 33–23	1,682	
October 11	1:00 pm	Central Connecticut State	University Field; Albany, NY		W 24–22	2,436	
October 18	1:00 pm	at Sacred Heart	Campus Field; Fairfield, CT		W 26–21	3,369	
October 25	4:00 pm	Saint Francis (PA)	University Field; Albany, NY		W 27–3	5,284	
November 1	1:00 pm	Monmouth	University Field; Albany, NY		W 35–17	3,526	
November 8	1:00 pm	at Robert Morris	Joe Walton Stadium; Moon Township, PA		W 41–7	1,021	
November 15	1:00 pm	Wagner	University Field; Albany, NY		W 30–11	2,317	
December 6	1:30 pm	Jacksonville*	University Field; Albany, NY (Gridiron Classic)	YES Network	W 28–0	2,264	
*Non-conference game; Rankings from The Sports Network Poll released prior to the game; All times are in Eastern time
