= 2008 VMI Keydets football team =

American college football season

2008 VMI Keydets football
- Conference: Big South Conference
- Record: 4–7 (1–4 Big South)
- Head coach: Sparky Woods (1st season)
- Offensive coordinator: Brent Davis (3rd season)
- Offensive scheme: Option
- Defensive coordinator: A. J. Christoff (1st season)
- Base defense: 4–3
- Home stadium: Alumni Memorial Field

2008 Big South Conference football standings
	Conf.			Overall
Team	W		L	W		L
No. 14 Liberty $	5	–	0	10	–	2
Stony Brook	3	–	2	5	–	6
Charleston Southern	3	–	2	7	–	5
Gardner–Webb	2	–	3	5	–	6
Coastal Carolina	1	–	4	6	–	6
VMI	1	–	4	4	–	7
Presbyterian	1	–	4	4	–	8
$ – Conference champion; Rankings from The Sports Network poll

The 2008 VMI Keydets football team represented the Virginia Military Institute during the 2008 NCAA Division I FCS football season. It was the Keydets 118th year of football, which began in 1891, and their 6th season in the Big South Conference. VMI was run by first year head coach Sparky Woods, who was previously a head coach at Appalachian State and South Carolina. Woods was a replacement for his predecessor Jim Reid, who departed from the Institute to be linebackers coach of the Miami Dolphins.

The Keydets enjoyed one of their most successful seasons in recent years in terms of wins. The year started with a convincing victory over St. Francis 49–0. After a 52–17 drubbing from William & Mary, the Keydets handled another Division-II opponent, Chowan, 69–20. A late second-half surge then pushed Ohio past VMI 51–31 the following week. Another large loss came from Richmond at home, 56–16. The Keydets did, however, get their first conference win since 2005, a 47–20 blowout victory over Coastal Carolina. VMI ended the year with a 49–27 win over future conference member Presbyterian, breaking a four-game losing streak.

== Schedule ==
Date	Time	Opponent	Site	Result	Attendance
September 6	1:30 pm	Saint Francis (PA)*	Alumni Memorial Field; Lexington, VA	W 49–0	5,123
September 13	7:00 pm	at William & Mary*	Zable Stadium; Williamsburg, VA (rivalry)	L 17–52	10,624
September 20	1:30 pm	Chowan*	Alumni Memorial Field; Lexington, VA	W 69–20	6,793
September 27	2:00 pm	at Ohio*	Peden Stadium; Athens, OH	L 31–51	19,938
October 4	1:30 pm	No. 6 Richmond*^{†}	Alumni Memorial Field; Lexington, VA	L 16–56	7,643
October 11	1:30 pm	Coastal Carolina	Alumni Memorial Field; Lexington, VA	W 47–20	8,157
October 25	1:30 pm	at Gardner–Webb	Spangler Stadium; Boiling Springs, NC	L 27–34	5,600
November 1	1:30 pm	at Charleston Southern	Buccaneer Field; North Charleston, SC	L 21–31	3,213
November 8	1:30 pm	Liberty	Alumni Memorial Field; Lexington, VA	L 26–38	6,813
November 15	3:30 pm	at Stony Brook	LaValle Stadium; Stony Brook, NY	L 26–40	2,051
November 22	1:30 pm	Presbyterian*	Alumni Memorial Field; Lexington, VA	W 49–27	4,710
*Non-conference game; ^{†}Homecoming; Rankings from The Sports Network Poll released prior to the game
