= 2008 Gardner–Webb Runnin' Bulldogs football team =

American college football season

2008 Gardner–Webb Runnin' Bulldogs football
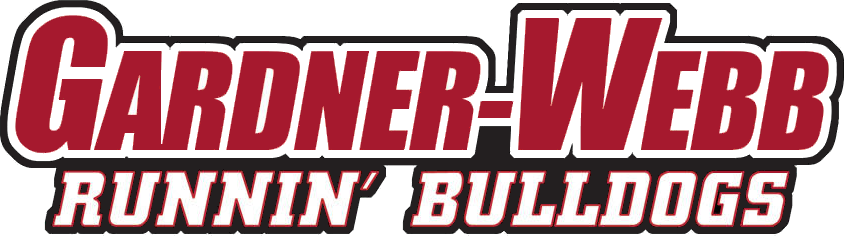
- Conference: Big South Conference
- Record: 7–5 (2–3 Big South)
- Head coach: Steve Patton (12th season)
- Defensive coordinator: John Windham (2nd season)
- Home stadium: Ernest W. Spangler Stadium

2008 Big South Conference football standings
	Conf.			Overall
Team	W		L	W		L
No. 14 Liberty $	5	–	0	10	–	2
Stony Brook	3	–	2	5	–	6
Charleston Southern	3	–	2	7	–	5
Gardner–Webb	2	–	3	5	–	6
Coastal Carolina	1	–	4	6	–	6
VMI	1	–	4	4	–	7
Presbyterian	1	–	4	4	–	8
$ – Conference champion; Rankings from The Sports Network poll

The 2008 Gardner–Webb Runnin' Bulldogs football team represented Gardner–Webb University as a member of the Big South Conference during the 2008 NCAA Division I FCS football season. Led by Steve Patton in his 12th-year as head coach, the Runnin' Bulldogs compiled an overall record of 7–5 with a mark of 2–3 in conference play, placing in fourth place in the Big South. Gardner–Webb played home games at Ernest W. Spangler Stadium in Boiling Springs, North Carolina.

== Schedule ==
Date	Time	Opponent	Site	TV	Result	Attendance	Source
August 28	7:00 pm	at Tennessee Tech*	Tucker Stadium; Cookeville, TN		L 12–28	12,228	
September 6	6:00 pm	Tusculum*	Ernest W. Spangler Stadium; Boiling Springs, NC		W 31–12	5,100	
September 13	7:00 pm	at Austin Peay*	Fortera Stadium; Clarksville, TN		W 31–15	4,903	
September 27	6:00 pm	Sam Houston State*	Ernest W. Spangler Stadium; Boiling Springs, NC		W 33–49	5,200	
October 4	1:30 pm	at Charleston Southern	Buccaneer Field; Charleston, SC		L 10–13	3,144	
October 11	3:30 pm	at Georgia Tech*	Bobby Dodd Stadium; Atlanta, GA		L 7–10	41,929	
October 18	6:00 pm	Presbyterian	Ernest W. Spangler Stadium; Boiling Springs, NC		W 47–21	4,250	
October 25	1:30 pm	VMI	Ernest W. Spangler Stadium; Boiling Springs, NC		W 34–27	5,600	
November 1	3:00 pm	at Stony Brook	Kenneth P. LaValle Stadium; Stony Brook, NY	Big South Net	W 34–33	2,217	
November 8	3:30 pm	Coastal Carolina	Ernest W. Spangler Stadium; Boiling Springs, NC		L 18–23	5,125	
November 15	7:00 pm	at No. 22 Liberty	Williams Stadium; Lynchburg, VA		L 10–30	10,636	
*Non-conference game; Rankings from The Sports Network Poll released prior to the game; All times are in Eastern time
