= 2008 Monmouth Hawks football team =

American college football season

2008 Monmouth Hawks football
- Conference: Northeast Conference
- Record: 7–4 (6–1 NEC)
- Head coach: Kevin Callahan (16th season)
- Offensive coordinator: Scott Van Zile (1st season)
- Offensive scheme: Multiple
- Defensive coordinator: Andy Bobik (15th season)
- Base defense: 4–3
- Home stadium: Kessler Field

2008 Northeast Conference football standings
	Conf.			Overall
Team	W		L	W		L
Albany $	7	–	0	9	–	3
Monmouth	6	–	1	7	–	5
Sacred Heart	4	–	3	8	–	3
Central Connecticut State	4	–	3	7	–	4
Robert Morris	4	–	3	5	–	6
Duquesne	2	–	5	3	–	7
Wagner	1	–	6	3	–	8
Saint Francis (PA)	0	–	7	0	–	11
$ – Conference champion

The 2008 Monmouth Hawks football team represented Monmouth University in the 2008 NCAA Division I FCS football season as a member of the Northeast Conference (NEC). The Hawks were led by 16th-year head coach Kevin Callahan and played their home games at Kessler Field. They finished the season 7–4 overall and 6–1 in NEC play to place second.

== Schedule ==
Date	Time	Opponent	Site	Result	Attendance	Source
August 30	1:00 p.m.	at Rhode Island*	Meade Stadium; Kingston, RI	L 24–27	3,220	
September 6	1:00 p.m.	Maine*	Kessler Field; West Long Branch, NJ	L 17–21	1,945	
September 13	1:00 p.m.	Coastal Carolina*	Kessler Field; West Long Branch, NJ	L 7–26	3,423	
September 20	1:00 p.m.	at Bryant	Bulldog Stadium; Smithfield, RI	W 30–17	2,107	
September 27	1:00 p.m.	at Robert Morris	Joe Walton Stadium; Moon Township, PA	W 34–26	1,553	
October 4	1:00 p.m.	Saint Francis (PA)	Kessler Field; West Long Branch, NJ	W 42–15	2,813	
October 11	1:00 p.m.	at Wagner	Wagner College Stadium; Staten Island, NY	W 31–17	1,759	
October 25	1:00 p.m.	Central Connecticut State	Kessler Field; West Long Branch, NJ	W 30–20	3,788	
November 1	1:00 p.m.	at Albany	University Field; Albany, NY	L 17–35	3,526	
November 8	1:00 p.m.	Sacred Heart	Kessler Field; West Long Branch, NJ	W 19–7	2,205	
November 15	1:00 p.m.	at Duquesne	Rooney Field; Pittsburgh, PA	W 37–14	805	
*Non-conference game; All times are in Eastern time
