= 2008 Georgia Southern Eagles football team =

American college football season

2008 Georgia Southern Eagles football
- Conference: Southern Conference
- Record: 6–5 (4–4 SoCon)
- Head coach: Chris Hatcher (2nd season)
- Offensive coordinator: Rance Gillespie (2nd season)
- Offensive scheme: Triple option
- Defensive coordinator: Ashley Anders (2nd season)
- Base defense: 4–3
- Home stadium: Paulson Stadium

2008 Southern Conference football standings
	Conf.			Overall
Team	W		L	W		L
No. 5 Appalachian State $^	8	–	0	11	–	3
No. 9 Wofford ^	7	–	1	9	–	3
No. 17 Elon	6	–	2	8	–	4
Furman	4	–	4	7	–	5
Samford	4	–	4	6	–	5
Georgia Southern	4	–	4	6	–	5
The Citadel	2	–	6	4	–	8
Western Carolina	1	–	7	3	–	9
Chattanooga	0	–	8	1	–	11
$ – Conference champion; ^ – FCS playoff participant; Rankings from The Sports Network FCS Poll

The 2008 Georgia Southern Eagles team represented Georgia Southern University in the 2008 NCAA Division I FCS football season. The Eagles were led by second year head coach Chris Hatcher and played their home games at Paulson Stadium. They are a member of the Southern Conference. They finished the season 6–5, 4–4 in Southern Conference play.

== Schedule ==
Date	Time	Opponent	Rank	Site	TV	Result	Attendance	Source
August 30	12:30 pm	at No. 1 (FBS) Georgia*	No. 17	Sanford Stadium; Athens, GA	PPV	L 21–45	92,746	
September 6	6:00 pm	Austin Peay*	No. 16	Paulson Stadium; Statesboro, GA	EV	W 34–20	18,225	
September 13	6:00 pm	Northeastern*	No. 15	Paulson Stadium; Statesboro, GA	EV	W 34–27 ^{OT}	17,491	
September 20	7:00 pm	No. 18 Elon	No. 14	Paulson Stadium; Statesboro, GA	CSS	L 20–22	17,049	
September 27	7:00 pm	No. 11 Wofford	No. 22	Paulson Stadium; Statesboro, GA	CSS	L 37–38 ^{OT}	17,958	
October 4	7:00 pm	at Chattanooga		Finley Stadium; Chattanooga, TN	EV	W 52–28	5,616	
October 18	3:00 pm	No. 2 Appalachian State	No. 25	Paulson Stadium; Statesboro, GA (rivalry)	SS	L 36–37	20,851	
October 25	1:00 pm	at Western Carolina		E. J. Whitmire Stadium; Cullowhee, NC		W 38–31 ^{OT}	8,327	
November 1	1:00 pm	at The Citadel		Johnson Hagood Stadium; Charleston, SC		W 44–41 ^{3OT}	11,190	
November 8	12:00 pm	Samford^{†}		Paulson Stadium; Statesboro, GA	CSS	L 17–27	17,436	
November 15	3:00 pm	at No. 16 Furman		Paladin Stadium; Greenville, SC	SS	W 17–10	10,496	
*Non-conference game; ^{†}Homecoming; Rankings from The Sports Network Poll released prior to the game; All times are in Eastern time
