= 2008 Presbyterian Blue Hose football team =

American college football season

2008 Presbyterian Blue Hose football
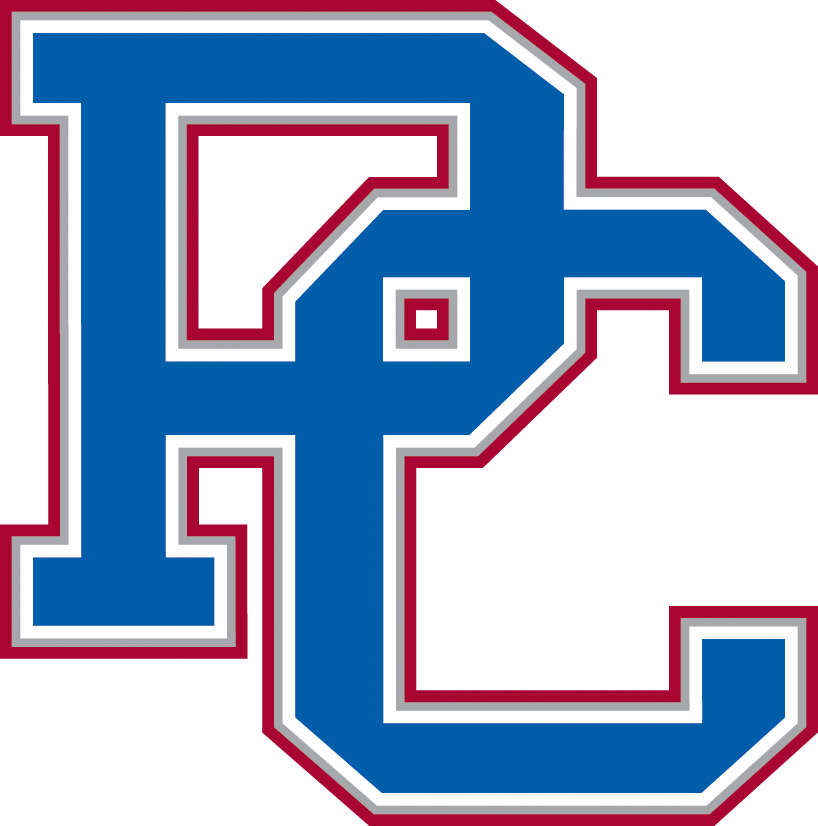
- Conference: Big South Conference
- Record: 4–8 (1–4 Big South)
- Head coach: Bobby Bentley (2nd season)
- Home stadium: Bailey Memorial Stadium

2008 Big South Conference football standings
	Conf.			Overall
Team	W		L	W		L
No. 14 Liberty $	5	–	0	10	–	2
Stony Brook	3	–	2	5	–	6
Charleston Southern	3	–	2	7	–	5
Gardner–Webb	2	–	3	5	–	6
Coastal Carolina	1	–	4	6	–	6
VMI	1	–	4	4	–	7
Presbyterian	1	–	4	4	–	8
$ – Conference champion; Rankings from The Sports Network poll

The 2008 Presbyterian Blue Hose football team represented Presbyterian College in the 2008 NCAA Division I FCS football season. They were led by second-year head coach Bobby Bentley and played their home games at Bailey Memorial Stadium. They were a member of the Big South Conference. They finished the season 4–8, 1–4 in Big South play to finish in last place.

== Schedule ==
Date	Time	Opponent	Site	Result	Attendance	Source
August 30	7:00 p.m.	at No. 13 Wofford*	Gibbs Stadium; Spartanburg, SC	L 21–38	7,931	
September 6	1:30 p.m.	Fayetteville State*	Bailey Memorial Stadium; Clinton, SC	W 38–28		
September 13	6:00 p.m.	at No. 18 Elon*	Rhodes Stadium; Elon, NC	L 12–66	7,232	
September 20	1:30 p.m.	Western Carolina*	Bailey Memorial Stadium; Clinton, SC	L 21–23	4,876	
September 27	7:00 p.m.	at No. 3 Appalachian State*	Kidd Brewer Stadium; Boone, NC	L 14–48	28,405	
October 4	2:00 p.m.	North Greenville*^{†}	Bailey Memorial Stadium; Clinton, SC	W 22–15		
October 11	1:30 p.m.	North Carolina Central*	Bailey Memorial Stadium; Clinton, SC	W 28–24		
October 18	6:00 p.m.	at Gardner–Webb	Ernest W. Spangler Stadium; Boiling Springs, NC	L 21–47	4,250	
November 1	1:30 p.m.	No. 17 Liberty	Bailey Memorial Stadium; Clinton, SC	W 31–28	6,193	
November 8	1:30 p.m.	at Charleston Southern	Buccaneer Field; Charleston, SC	L 18–29	3,291	
November 15	1:30 p.m.	Coastal Carolina	Brooks Stadium; Conway, SC	L 13–21	6,241	
November 22	1:30 p.m.	at VMI	Alumni Memorial Field; Lexington, VA	L 27–49	4,710	
*Non-conference game; ^{†}Homecoming; Rankings from STATS Poll released prior to the game; All times are in Eastern time
