= 2008 Liberty Flames football team =

American college football season

2008 Liberty Flames football
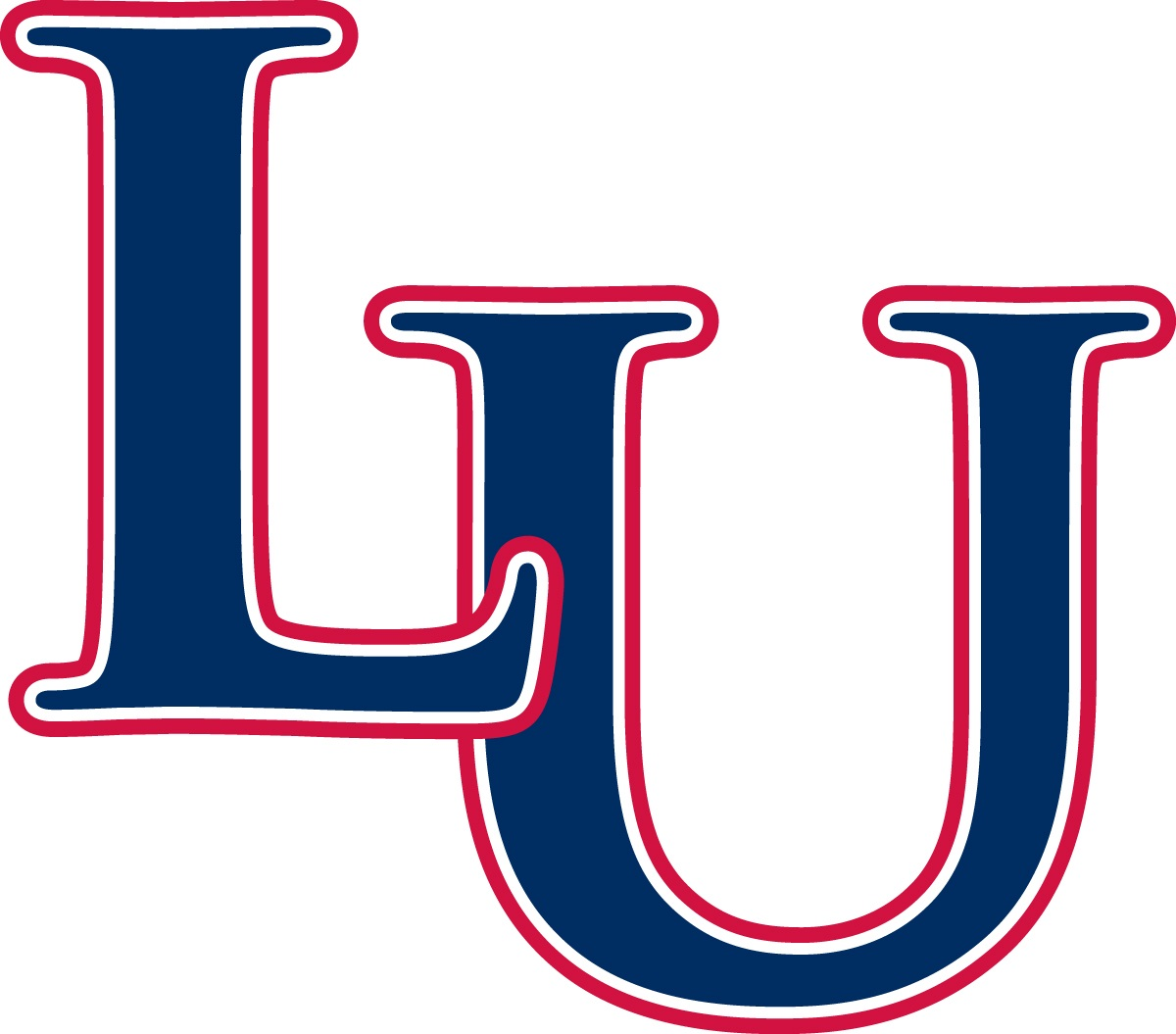

Big South champion
- Conference: Big South Conference

Ranking
- Sports Network: No. 14
- FCS Coaches: No. 15
- Record: 10–2 (5–0 Big South)
- Head coach: Danny Rocco (3rd season)
- Offensive coordinator: Scott Wachenheim (3rd season)
- Defensive coordinator: Tom Clark (3rd season)
- Base defense: 3–4
- Home stadium: Williams Stadium

2008 Big South Conference football standings
| | Conf. | | | Overall |
| Team | W | | L | W | | L |
|---|---|---|---|---|---|---|
| No. 14 Liberty $ | 5 | – | 0 | 10 | – | 2 |
| Stony Brook | 3 | – | 2 | 5 | – | 6 |
| Charleston Southern | 3 | – | 2 | 7 | – | 5 |
| Gardner–Webb | 2 | – | 3 | 5 | – | 6 |
| Coastal Carolina | 1 | – | 4 | 6 | – | 6 |
| VMI | 1 | – | 4 | 4 | – | 7 |
| Presbyterian | 1 | – | 4 | 4 | – | 8 |
$ – Conference champion; Rankings from The Sports Network poll

The 2008 Liberty Flames football team represented Liberty University a member of the Big South Conference during the 2008 NCAA Division I FCS football season. Led by third-year head coach Danny Rocco, the Flames compiled an overall record of 10–2 with a mark of 5–0 in conference play, winning the Big South title. Liberty played home games at Williams Stadium in Lynchburg, Virginia.

== Schedule ==
| Date | Time | Opponent | Rank | Site | TV | Result | Attendance | Source |
|---|---|---|---|---|---|---|---|---|
| August 30 | 7:00 pm | North Greenville* | | Williams Stadium; Lynchburg, VA | | W 49–10 | 15,311 | |
| September 6 | 7:00 pm | Glenville State* | | Williams Stadium; Lynchburg, VA | | W 44–27 | 13,917 | |
| September 13 | 6:00 pm | at Western Carolina* | No. 25 | Bob Waters Field at E. J. Whitmire Stadium; Cullowhee, NC | | W 19–16 | 7,289 | |
| September 27 | 6:00 pm | at No. 23 Youngstown State* | No. 25 | Stambaugh Stadium; Youngstown, OH | | W 31–28 | 18,978 | |
| October 4 | 7:00 pm | at Coastal Carolina | No. 20 | Brooks Stadium; Conway, SC (rivalry) | | W 43–38 | 7,063 | |
| October 11 | 3:30 pm | Stony Brook | No. 15 | Williams Stadium; Lynchburg, VA | MASN, Big South Net | W 33–0 | 14,563 | |
| October 18 | 12:30 pm | Lafayette* | No. 14 | Williams Stadium; Lynchburg, VA | LSN | L 21–35 | 15,483 | |
| October 25 | 3:30 pm | Charleston Southern^{†} | No. 20 | Williams Stadium; Lynchburg, VA | | W 42–0 | 14,365 | |
| November 1 | 1:30 pm | at Presbyterian | No. 17 | Bailey Memorial Stadium; Clinton, SC | | L 28–31 | 6,193 | |
| November 8 | 1:30 pm | at VMI | No. 25 | Alumni Memorial Field; Lexington, VA | | W 38–26 | 6,813 | |
| November 15 | 7:00 pm | Gardner–Webb | No. 22 | Williams Stadium; Lynchburg, VA | | W 30–10 | 10,636 | |
| November 22 | 1:00 pm | No. 14 Elon* | No. 20 | Williams Stadium; Lynchburg, VA | | W 26–3 | 7,751 | |
*Non-conference game; ^{†}Homecoming; Rankings from The Sports Network Poll released prior to the game; All times are in Eastern time
