= 2008 Stony Brook Seawolves football team =

American college football season

2008 Stony Brook Seawolves football
- Conference: Big South Conference
- Record: 5–6 (3–2 Big South)
- Head coach: Chuck Priore (3rd season)
- Offensive coordinator: Jeff Behrman (3rd season)
- Home stadium: Kenneth P. LaValle Stadium

2008 Big South Conference football standings
	Conf.			Overall
Team	W		L	W		L
No. 14 Liberty $	5	–	0	10	–	2
Stony Brook	3	–	2	5	–	6
Charleston Southern	3	–	2	7	–	5
Gardner–Webb	2	–	3	5	–	6
Coastal Carolina	1	–	4	6	–	6
VMI	1	–	4	4	–	7
Presbyterian	1	–	4	4	–	8
$ – Conference champion; Rankings from The Sports Network poll

The 2008 Stony Brook Seawolves football team represented Stony Brook University as a member of the Big South Conference during the 2008 NCAA Division I FCS football season. Led by third-year head coach Chuck Priore, the Seawolves compiled an overall record of 5–6 with a mark of 3–2 in conference place, tying for second place in Big South. Stony Brook played home games at Kenneth P. LaValle Stadium in Stony Brook, New York.

== Schedule ==
Date	Time	Opponent	Site	TV	Result	Attendance	Source
August 30	6:00 pm	Colgate*	Kenneth P. LaValle Stadium; Stony Brook, NY	Big South Net	W 42–26	5,808	
September 6	3:00 pm	No. 17 Elon*	Kenneth P. LaValle Stadium; Stony Brook, NY	Big South Net	L 20–30	1,806	
September 13	6:00 pm	at Maine*	Alfond Stadium; Orono, ME (The Battle for the Butter)	WABI-TV, Big South Net	L 13–28	6,425	
September 20	12:30 pm	at Brown*	Brown Stadium; Providence, RI	Big South Net	L 7–17	3,652	
September 26	7:00 pm	Hofstra*	Kenneth P. LaValle Stadium; Stony Brook, NY (Battle of Long Island)	MSG, Big South Net	L 3-41	2,105	
October 11	3:30 pm	at No. 15 Liberty	Williams Stadium; Lynchburg, VA	MASN, Big South Net	L 0–33	14,563	
October 18	3:00 pm	Charleston Southern	Kenneth P. LaValle Stadium; Stony Brook, NY	Big South Net	W 20–19	5,544	
October 25	7:30 pm	at Coastal Carolina	Brooks Stadium; Conway, SC	Big South Net	W 28–24	6,704	
November 1	3:00 pm	Gardner–Webb	Kenneth P. LaValle Stadium; Stony Brook, NY	Big South Net	L 33–34	2,217	
November 8	1:00 pm	at Iona*	Mazzella Field; New Rochelle, NY	Big South Net	W 68–9	238	
November 15	3:30 pm	VMI^{†}	Kenneth P. LaValle Stadium; Stony Brook, NY	MASN, Big South Net	W 40–26	2,051	
*Non-conference game; ^{†}Homecoming; Rankings from The Sports Network Poll released prior to the game; All times are in Eastern time
