= 2008 Furman Paladins football team =

American college football season

2008 Furman Paladins football
- Conference: Southern Conference
- Record: 7–5 (4–4 SoCon)
- Head coach: Bobby Lamb (7th season)
- Captains: Joel Bell; Brantley Kendall; William Middleton
- Home stadium: Paladin Stadium

2008 Southern Conference football standings
	Conf.			Overall
Team	W		L	W		L
No. 5 Appalachian State $^	8	–	0	11	–	3
No. 9 Wofford ^	7	–	1	9	–	3
No. 17 Elon	6	–	2	8	–	4
Furman	4	–	4	7	–	5
Samford	4	–	4	6	–	5
Georgia Southern	4	–	4	6	–	5
The Citadel	2	–	6	4	–	8
Western Carolina	1	–	7	3	–	9
Chattanooga	0	–	8	1	–	11
$ – Conference champion; ^ – FCS playoff participant; Rankings from The Sports Network FCS Poll

The 2008 Furman Paladins football team was an American football team that represented Furman University as a member of the Southern Conference (SoCon) during the 2008 NCAA Division I FCS football season. In their seventh year under head coach Bobby Lamb, the Paladins compiled an overall record of 7–5 with a conference mark of 4–4, finishing tied for fourth in the SoCon.

== Schedule ==
Date	Opponent	Rank	Site	Result	Attendance	Source
August 30	Mars Hill*		Paladin Stadium; Greenville, SC	W 62–14	8,419	
September 6	at Virginia Tech*		Lane Stadium; Blacksburg, VA	L 7–24	66,233	
September 13	at Colgate*		Andy Kerr Stadium; Hamilton, NY	W 42–21	5,857	
September 20	No. 6 Delaware*	No. 23	Paladin Stadium; Greenville, SC	W 23–21	12,781	
September 27	Chattanooga	No. 16	Paladin Stadium; Greenville, SC	W 35–10	9,017	
October 4	at No. 7 Elon	No. 15	Rhodes Stadium; Elon, NC	L 10–31	7,469	
October 11	Western Carolina	No. 20	Paladin Stadium; Greenville, SC	W 28–21	10,078	
October 18	No. 24 The Citadel	No. 19	Paladin Stadium; Greenville, SC (rivalry)	W 34–20	9,644	
October 25	at No. 2 Appalachian State	No. 18	Kidd Brewer Stadium; Boone, NC	L 14–26	27,848	
November 1	at Samford	No. 18	Seibert Stadium; Homewood, AL	W 28–27	5,773	
November 15	Georgia Southern	No. 16	Paladin Stadium; Greenville, SC	L 10–17	10,496	
November 22	at No. 10 Wofford	No. 20	Gibbs Stadium; Spartanburg, SC (rivalry)	L 10–35	9,654	
*Non-conference game; Rankings from The Sports Network Poll released prior to the game
