= 2008 Western Carolina Catamounts football team =

American college football season

2008 Western Carolina Catamounts football
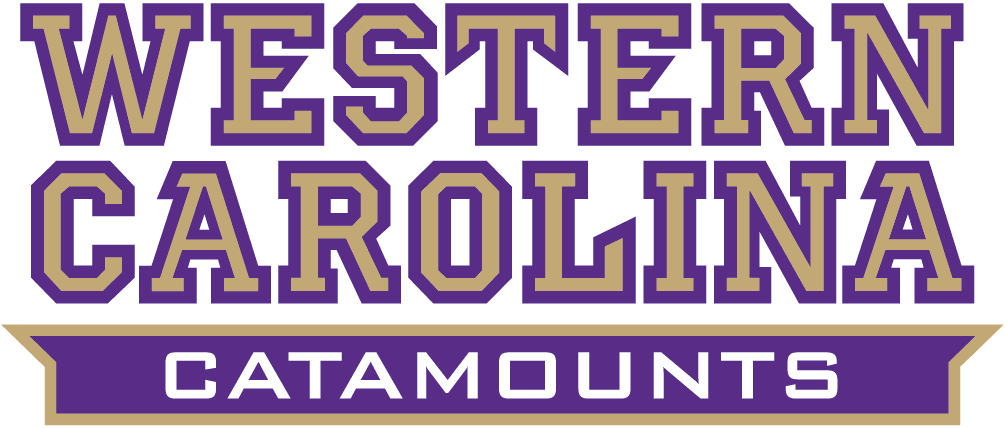
- Conference: Southern Conference
- Record: 3–9 (1–7 SoCon)
- Head coach: Dennis Wagner (1st season)
- Offensive coordinator: Keith Heckendorf (1st season)
- Defensive coordinator: Matt Pawlowski (1st season)
- Home stadium: Bob Waters Field at E. J. Whitmire Stadium

2008 Southern Conference football standings
	Conf.			Overall
Team	W		L	W		L
No. 5 Appalachian State $^	8	–	0	11	–	3
No. 9 Wofford ^	7	–	1	9	–	3
No. 17 Elon	6	–	2	8	–	4
Furman	4	–	4	7	–	5
Samford	4	–	4	6	–	5
Georgia Southern	4	–	4	6	–	5
The Citadel	2	–	6	4	–	8
Western Carolina	1	–	7	3	–	9
Chattanooga	0	–	8	1	–	11
$ – Conference champion; ^ – FCS playoff participant; Rankings from The Sports Network poll

The 2008 Western Carolina Catamounts football team represented Western Carolina University as a member of the Southern Conference (SoCon) during the 2008 NCAA Division I FCS football season. Led by first-year head coach Dennis Wagner, the Catamounts compiled an overall record of 3–9 with a mark of 1–7 in conference play, placing eighth in the SoCon. Western Carolina played home games at Bob Waters Field at E. J. Whitmire Stadium in Cullowhee, North Carolina.

== Schedule ==
Date	Time	Opponent	Site	TV	Result	Attendance	Source
August 28		Shorter*	Bob Waters Field at E. J. Whitmire Stadium; Cullowhee, NC		W 35–0	5,778	
September 6	6:00 p.m.	at Florida State*	Doak Campbell Stadium; Tallahassee, FL	SUN PPV	L 0–69	73,024	
September 13	6:00 p.m.	No. 25 Liberty*	Bob Waters Field at E. J. Whitmire Stadium; Cullowhee, NC		L 16–19	7,289	
September 20	1:30 p.m.	at Presbyterian*	Bailey Memorial Stadium; Clinton, SC		W 23–21	4,876	
September 27	1:30 p.m.	at No. 13 The Citadel	Johnson Hagood Stadium; Charleston, SC		L 14–34	11,216	
October 4	1:00 p.m.	Samford^{†}	Bob Waters Field at E. J. Whitmire Stadium; Cullowhee, NC		L 6–21	9,174	
October 11		at No. 20 Furman	Paladin Stadium; Greenville, SC		L 21–28	10,078	
October 18	1:30 p.m.	at No. 6 Wofford	Gibbs Stadium; Spartanburg, SC		L 14–42	7,063	
October 25	1:00 p.m.	Georgia Southern	Bob Waters Field at E. J. Whitmire Stadium; Cullowhee, NC		L 31–38 ^{2OT}	8,327	
November 1	1:00 p.m.	Chattanooga	Bob Waters Field at E. J. Whitmire Stadium; Cullowhee, NC		W 27–7	5,137	
November 8	1:30 p.m.	at No. 11 Elon	Rhodes Stadium; Elon, NC		L 14–33	10,747	
November 22	3:00 p.m.	No. 2 Appalachian State	Bob Waters Field at E. J. Whitmire Stadium; Cullowhee, NC (Battle for the Old Mountain Jug)	SportSouth	L 10–35	14,213	
*Non-conference game; ^{†}Homecoming; Rankings from The Sports Network Poll released prior to the game; All times are in Eastern time
