= 2008 Wofford Terriers football team =

American college football season

2008 Wofford Terriers football

NCAA Division I First Round, L 35–38 vs. James Madison
- Conference: Southern Conference

Ranking
- Sports Network: No. 9
- Record: 9–3 (7–1 SoCon)
- Head coach: Mike Ayers (21st season)
- Home stadium: Gibbs Stadium

2008 Southern Conference football standings
	Conf.			Overall
Team	W		L	W		L
No. 5 Appalachian State $^	8	–	0	11	–	3
No. 9 Wofford ^	7	–	1	9	–	3
No. 17 Elon	6	–	2	8	–	4
Furman	4	–	4	7	–	5
Samford	4	–	4	6	–	5
Georgia Southern	4	–	4	6	–	5
The Citadel	2	–	6	4	–	8
Western Carolina	1	–	7	3	–	9
Chattanooga	0	–	8	1	–	11
$ – Conference champion; ^ – FCS playoff participant; Rankings from The Sports Network poll

The 2008 Wofford Terriers football team represented Wofford College during the 2008 NCAA Division I FCS football season. The team was led by 21st-year head coach Mike Ayers and played its home games at Gibbs Stadium. It finished the regular season with a 9–3 record overall and a 7–1 record in the Southern Conference, tying for seventh place. The team qualified for the playoffs, in which they were eliminated in the first round by James Madison.

== Schedule ==
Date	Time	Opponent	Rank	Site	TV	Result	Attendance	Source
August 30	7:00 pm	Presbyterian*	No. 13	Gibbs Stadium; Spartanburg, SC		W 38–21	7,931	
September 6	6:00 pm	Charleston Southern*	No. 13	Gibbs Stadium; Spartanburg, SC		W 41–23	3,817	
September 20	7:00 pm	at South Carolina*	No. 12	Williams–Brice Stadium; Columbia, SC	PPV	L 13–23	76,599	
September 27	7:00 pm	at No. 22 Georgia Southern	No. 11	Paulson Stadium; Statesboro, GA	CSS	W 38–37 ^{OT}	17,958	
October 11	3:00 pm	Chattanooga	No. 9	Gibbs Stadium; Spartanburg, SC		W 56–7	8,394	
October 18	1:30 pm	Western Carolina	No. 6	Gibbs Stadium; Spartanburg, SC		W 42–14	7,063	
October 25	3:00 pm	at No. 3 Elon	No. 4	Rhodes Stadium; Elon, NC		W 55–20	7,874	
October 31	8:00 pm	No. 2 Appalachian State	No. 3	Kidd Brewer Stadium; Boone, NC	ESPN2	L 24–70	30,931	
November 8	3:00 pm	The Citadel	No. 10	Gibbs Stadium; Spartanburg, SC (rivalry)	SSN	W 33–28	10,011	
November 15	3:00 pm	at Samford	No. 9	Seibert Stadium; Homewood, AL		W 28–7	2,973	
November 22	12:00 pm	No. 20 Furman	No. 10	Gibbs Stadium; Spartanburg, SC (rivalry)		W 35–10	9,654	
November 29	3:00 pm	at No. 1 James Madison*	No. 8	Bridgeforth Stadium; Harrisonburg, VA (NCAA Division I First Round)		L 35–38	12,826	
*Non-conference game; Rankings from The Sports Network Poll released prior to the game; All times are in Eastern time
