= 2008 Wagner Seahawks football team =

American college football season

2008 Wagner Seahawks football
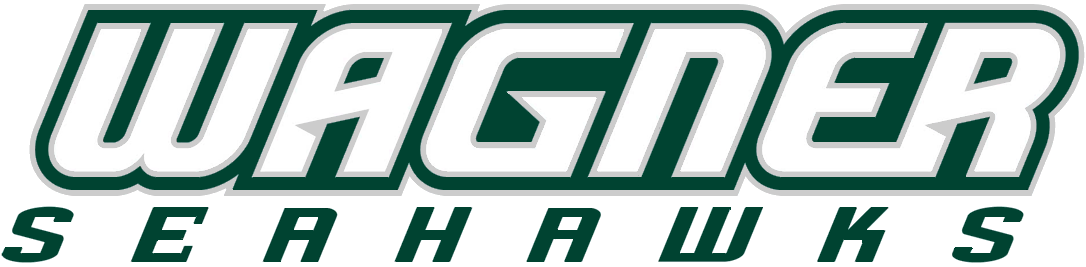
- Conference: Northeast Conference
- Record: 3–8 (1–6 NEC)
- Head coach: Walt Hameline (28th season)
- Home stadium: Wagner College Stadium

2008 Northeast Conference football standings
| | Conf. | | | Overall |
| Team | W | | L | W | | L |
|---|---|---|---|---|---|---|
| Albany $ | 7 | – | 0 | 9 | – | 3 |
| Monmouth | 6 | – | 1 | 7 | – | 5 |
| Sacred Heart | 4 | – | 3 | 8 | – | 3 |
| Central Connecticut State | 4 | – | 3 | 7 | – | 4 |
| Robert Morris | 4 | – | 3 | 5 | – | 6 |
| Duquesne | 2 | – | 5 | 3 | – | 7 |
| Wagner | 1 | – | 6 | 3 | – | 8 |
| Saint Francis (PA) | 0 | – | 7 | 0 | – | 11 |
$ – Conference champion

The 2008 Wagner Seahawks football team represented Wagner College in the 2008 NCAA Division I FCS football season as a member of the Northeast Conference (NEC). The Seahawks were led by 28th-year head coach Walt Hameline and played their home games at Wagner College Stadium. Wagner finished the season 3–7 overall and 1–6 in NEC play to place seventh.

== Schedule ==
| Date | Time | Opponent | Site | Result | Attendance |
|---|---|---|---|---|---|
| September 5 | 1:00 p.m. | at Stonehill* | W.B. Mason Stadium; Easton, MA | L 13–14 | 2,400 |
| September 13 | 1:00 p.m. | Iona* | Wagner College Stadium; Staten Island, NY | W 45–28 | 2,216 |
| September 19 | 7:00 p.m. | at Marist* | Leonidoff Field; Poughkeepsie, NY | W 21–14 | 2,512 |
| September 27 | 1:00 p.m. | Bryant | Wagner College Stadium; Staten Island, NY | L 14–24 | 1,467 |
| October 4 | 1:00 p.m. | at Central Connecticut | Arute Field; New Britain, CT | L 10–35 | 3,124 |
| October 11 | 1:00 p.m. | Monmouth | Wagner College Stadium; Staten Island, NY | L 17–31 | 1,759 |
| October 18 | 1:00 p.m. | Saint Francis (PA) | DeGol Field; Loretto, PA | W 17–13 | 1,023 |
| October 25 | 1:00 p.m. | Robert Morris | Wagner College Stadium; Staten Island, NY | L 3–35 | 1,013 |
| October 31 | 7:00 p.m. | at Sacred Heart | Campus Field; Fairfield, CT | L 20–42 | 1,591 |
| November 8 | 1:00 p.m. | Duquesne | Wagner College Stadium; Staten Island, NY | L 0–14 | 1,015 |
| November 15 | 1:00 p.m. | Albany | University Field; Albany, NY | L 11–30 | 2,317 |
*Non-conference game; All times are in Eastern time
