= 2008 Coastal Carolina Chanticleers football team =

American college football season

2008 Coastal Carolina Chanticleers football
- Conference: Big South Conference
- Record: 6–6 (1–4 Big South)
- Head coach: David Bennett (6th season)
- Offensive coordinator: Jamie Snider (6th season)
- Offensive scheme: Multiple
- Defensive coordinator: Curtis Walker (6th season)
- Base defense: 4–3
- Home stadium: Brooks Stadium

2008 Big South Conference football standings
	Conf.			Overall
Team	W		L	W		L
No. 14 Liberty $	5	–	0	10	–	2
Stony Brook	3	–	2	5	–	6
Charleston Southern	3	–	2	7	–	5
Gardner–Webb	2	–	3	5	–	6
Coastal Carolina	1	–	4	6	–	6
VMI	1	–	4	4	–	7
Presbyterian	1	–	4	4	–	8
$ – Conference champion; Rankings from The Sports Network poll

The 2008 Coastal Carolina Chanticleers football team represented Coastal Carolina University as a member of the Big South Conference during the 2008 NCAA Division I FCS football season. Led by sixth-year head coach David Bennett, the Chanticleers compiled an overall record of 6–6 with a mark of 1–4 in conference play, placing in a three-way tie for fifth in the Big South. Coastal Carolina played home games at Brooks Stadium in Conway, South Carolina.

== Schedule ==
Date	Time	Opponent	Site	Result	Attendance	Source
August 30	12:00 p.m.	at No. 22 (FBS) Penn State*	Beaver Stadium; University Park, PA	L 10–66	106,577	
September 7	1:00 p.m.	Colgate*	Brooks Stadium; Conway, SC	L 19–23	6,433	
September 13	1:00 p.m.	at Monmouth*	Kessler Field; West Long Branch, NJ	W 26–7	3,423	
September 20	7:00 p.m.	Towson*	Brooks Stadium; Conway, SC	W 31–3	8,204	
September 27	6:00 p.m.	at North Carolina A&T*	Aggie Stadium; Greensboro, NC	W 20–7	2,062	
October 4	7:00 pm.	No. 20 Liberty	Brooks Stadium; Conway, SC (rivalry)	L 38–43	7,063	
October 11	1:00 p.m.	at VMI	Foster Stadium; Lexington, VA	L 20–47	8,157	
October 18	7:00 p.m.	North Carolina Central	Brooks Stadium; Conway, SC	W 35–10	6,394	
October 25	7:00 p.m.	Stony Brook	Brooks Stadium; Conway, SC	L 24–28	6,704	
November 8	3:30 p.m.	at Gardner–Webb	Ernest W. Spangler Stadium; Boiling Springs, NC	W 23–18	5,125	
November 15	1:30 p.m.	at Presbyterian	Bailey Memorial Stadium; Clinton, SC	W 21–13	6,241	
November 22	6:00 p.m.	Charleston Southern	Brooks Stadium; Conway, SC	L 0–24	5,648	
*Non-conference game; Rankings from The Sports Network Poll released prior to the game; All times are in Eastern time
