= 2008 Appalachian State Mountaineers football team =

American college football season

2008 Appalachian State Mountaineers football

SoCon champion

NCAA Division I Quarterfinal, L 13–33 vs. Richmond
- Conference: Southern Conference

Ranking
- Sports Network: No. 5
- FCS Coaches: No. 5
- Record: 11–3 (8–0 Southern)
- Head coach: Jerry Moore (20th season)
- Offensive coordinator: Collaborative
- Offensive scheme: Multiple spread
- Defensive coordinator: John Wiley (18th season)
- Base defense: 4–3
- Home stadium: Kidd Brewer Stadium

2008 Southern Conference football standings
	Conf.			Overall
Team	W		L	W		L
No. 5 Appalachian State $^	8	–	0	11	–	3
No. 9 Wofford ^	7	–	1	9	–	3
No. 17 Elon	6	–	2	8	–	4
Furman	4	–	4	7	–	5
Samford	4	–	4	6	–	5
Georgia Southern	4	–	4	6	–	5
The Citadel	2	–	6	4	–	8
Western Carolina	1	–	7	3	–	9
Chattanooga	0	–	8	1	–	11
$ – Conference champion; ^ – FCS playoff participant; Rankings from The Sports Network poll

The 2008 Appalachian State Mountaineers football team represented Appalachian State University in the 2008 NCAA Division I FCS football season. It was the 79th season of play for the Mountaineers. The team was led by Jerry Moore, the 2006 Eddie Robinson Award winner for Coach of the Year. It was his 20th season as head coach. The Mountaineers played their home games at Kidd Brewer Stadium in Boone, North Carolina.

Appalachian completed a perfect Southern Conference season at 8–0, and became just the fourth football program in conference history to win four straight conference titles. A quarterfinal playoff loss to the Richmond Spiders ended Appalachian's season, the quest for four consecutive national titles, and snapped the Mountaineers' record string of consecutive playoff victories at 13. Ending the season on a positive note was quarterback Armanti Edwards, who was honored with the Walter Payton Award, given annually to the Division I FCS most outstanding offensive player.

== Schedule ==
Date	Time	Opponent	Rank	Site	TV	Result	Attendance	Source
August 30	11:00 a.m.	at No. 7 (FBS) LSU*	No. 1	Tiger Stadium; Baton Rouge, LA	ESPNC	L 13–41	91,922	
September 6	3:30 p.m.	Jacksonville*	No. 1	Kidd Brewer Stadium; Boone, NC		W 56–7	30,718	
September 20	7:00 p.m.	at No. 5 James Madison*	No. 1	Bridgeforth Stadium; Harrisonburg, VA	Comcast	L 32–35	17,163	
September 27	7:00 p.m.	Presbyterian*	No. 3	Kidd Brewer Stadium; Boone, NC		W 48–14	28,405	
October 4	3:00 p.m.	No. 12 The Citadel^{†}	No. 2	Kidd Brewer Stadium; Boone, NC	SportSouth	W 47–21	29,631	
October 11	3:30 p.m.	at Samford	No. 2	Seibert Stadium; Homewood, AL		W 35–24	10,670	
October 18	3:00 p.m.	at Georgia Southern	No. 2	Paulson Stadium; Statesboro, GA (rivalry)	SportSouth	W 37–36	20,851	
October 25	3:30 p.m.	No. 18 Furman	No. 2	Kidd Brewer Stadium; Boone, NC (Black Saturday)		W 26–14	27,848	
October 31	8:00 p.m.	No. 3 Wofford	No. 2	Kidd Brewer Stadium; Boone, NC	ESPN2	W 70–24	30,931	
November 8	2:00 p.m.	at Chattanooga	No. 2	Finley Stadium; Chattanooga, TN		W 49–7	6,057	
November 15	3:30 p.m.	No. 11 Elon	No. 2	Kidd Brewer Stadium; Boone, NC		W 24–16	24,831	
November 22	3:00 p.m.	at Western Carolina	No. 2	E. J. Whitmire Stadium; Cullowhee, NC (Battle for the Old Mountain Jug)	SportSouth	W 35–10	14,213	
November 29	12:00 p.m.	No. 13 South Carolina State*	No. 2	Kidd Brewer Stadium; Boone, NC (NCAA Division I First Round)	ESPNU	W 37–21	13,712	
December 6	12:00 p.m.	No. 7 Richmond*	No. 2	Kidd Brewer Stadium; Boone, NC (NCAA Division I Quarterfinal)		L 13–33	15,215	
*Non-conference game; ^{†}Homecoming; Rankings from The Sports Network Poll released prior to the game; All times are in Eastern time

== Rankings ==
Ranking movements Legend: ██ Increase in ranking ██ Decrease in ranking
	Week														
Poll	Pre	1	2	3	4	5	6	7	8	9	10	11	12	13	Final
The Sports Network	1	1	1	1	3	2	2	2	2	2	2	2	2	2	5
FCS Coaches	1	2	2	1	4	3	2	2	2	2	2	2	2	2	5

== Game summaries ==
=== LSU ===
	1	2	3	4	Total
Appalachian State	0	0	7	6	13
LSU	14	17	3	7	41

=== Jacksonville ===
	1	2	3	4	Total
Jacksonville	0	0	7	0	7
Appalachian State	21	7	14	14	56

=== James Madison ===
	1	2	3	4	Total
Appalachian State	7	14	3	8	32
James Madison	0	0	21	14	35

=== Presbyterian ===
	1	2	3	4	Total
Presbyterian	7	7	0	0	14
Appalachian State	7	10	17	14	48

=== The Citadel ===
	1	2	3	4	Total
The Citadel	0	7	7	7	21
Appalachian State	7	34	0	6	47

=== Samford ===
	1	2	3	4	Total
Appalachian State	7	21	0	7	35
Samford	14	0	3	7	24

=== Georgia Southern ===
	1	2	3	4	Total
Appalachian State	7	7	10	13	37
Georgia Southern	10	10	7	9	36

=== Furman ===
	1	2	3	4	Total
Furman	0	7	0	7	14
Appalachian State	6	7	0	13	26

=== Wofford ===
	1	2	3	4	Total
Wofford	14	0	10	0	24
Appalachian State	21	21	7	21	70

=== Chattanooga ===
	1	2	3	4	Total
Appalachian State	21	14	14	0	49
Chattanooga	7	0	0	0	7

=== Elon ===
	1	2	3	4	Total
Elon	0	10	6	0	16
Appalachian State	7	7	7	3	24

=== Western Carolina ===
	1	2	3	4	Total
Appalachian State	0	7	14	14	35
Western Carolina	7	3	0	0	10

=== South Carolina State ===
	1	2	3	4	Total
South Carolina State	7	7	7	0	21
Appalachian State	7	10	7	13	37

=== Richmond ===
	1	2	3	4	Total
Richmond	6	0	17	10	33
Appalachian State	7	0	6	0	13

== Personnel ==
=== Coaching staff ===
Name	Position	Alma Mater	Year
Jerry Moore	Head coach	Baylor, 1961	20th
John Wiley	Defensive Coordinator/Defensive Backs	East Texas State, 1984	18th
Dale Jones	Linebackers	Tennessee, 1988	13th
Scott Satterfield	Quarterbacks	Appalachian State, 1996	10th
Shawn Elliott	Offensive Line	Appalachian State, 1996	12th
Chris Moore	Running Backs	Appalachian State, 1999	14th
Mark Speir	Defensive Line/Recruiting Coordinator	Clemson, 1990	6th
Antonio Carter	Wide Receivers (Split Ends)	Alabama, 2004	1st
Brad Glenn	Wide Receivers (Slot)	Clemson, 1995	4th
Nic Cardwell	Tight Ends	Appalachian State, 2008	1st
John Holt	Offensive Quality Control	Appalachian State, 2008	1st
Brad West	Defensive Quality Control	Appalachian State, 2006	2nd
Trey Elder	Student Assistant	Appalachian State, 2008	1st
Jeff Dillman	Strength & Conditioning	Appalachian State, 2001	3rd

=== Roster ===
2008 Appalachian State Mountaineers football team roster
Players
Coaches
Offense

Pos.	#	Name	Class
QB	2	DeAndre Presley	Fr
WR	3	Blake Elder	So
WR	4	Anthony Cruver	Sr
WR	6	CoCo Hillary	So
WR	7	James Hill	Sr
WR	8	Brian Quick	Fr
QB	10	Hunter Stewart	Jr
QB	11	Jey Yokeley	Fr
WR	12	T. J. Courman	Sr
QB	14	Armanti Edwards	Jr
RB	16	Devin Radford	So
WR	17	Matt Cline	So
WR	19	Tavaris Washington	Jr
RB	20	Devon Moore	Jr
RB	21	Robert Welton	So
RB	26	Josh Jackson	Jr
RB	29	Cedric Baker	Fr
TE	35	Trey Hennessee	Sr
TE	41	Brandon Simpkins	Sr
TE	43	Brandon Thompson	So
OL	50	Nick Sloan	So
OL	51	Sherman Holt	Fr
OL	57	Brett Irvin	So
OL	60	Brad Coley	Sr
OL	61	Mario Acitelli	Jr
OL	62	Xan Thomas	Fr
OL	63	Daniel Kilgore	So
OL	64	Orry Frye	Fr
OL	67	Zach Brown	Jr
OL	68	Steve Smith	Fr
OL	70	Matt Ruff	Fr
OL	71	Pat Mills	So
OL	72	Jonathan Bieschke	Sr
OL	73	Corbett Harris	So
OL	74	Don Reeves	Fr
OL	77	Jacob Newton	So
OL	78	Chris Marshall	Fr
WR	80	Ben King	Fr
WR	81	Clay McKnight	Sr
WR	82	Josh Johnson	Jr
WR	83	Dominick Magazu	Fr
TE	84	Ben Jorden	Fr
WR	85	B. J. Frazier	So
TE	86	Tim Frye	So
WR	87	Brandon Knox	Jr
TE	89	Matt Beecher	Fr
WR		Tyler Brown	Fr
RB		Rod Chisholm	Fr
QB		Jamie DeGeare	Fr
WR		Wes Stringfield	Fr
TE		Nic Vannoy	Fr
WR		Regan Zanes	Fr

Defense

Pos.	#	Name	Class
DB	5	Cortez Gilbert	Jr
LB	9	D. J. Smith	So
DB	13	Mark LeGree	So
DB	15	Jared Reine	So
DB	18	Dominique McDuffie	Fr
DB	22	Leonard Love	Sr
DB	25	Billy Riddle	Sr
DB	27	Josh Smith	So
DB	28	Ed Gainey	Fr
LB	30	Brandon Olsen	Fr
LB	31	Pierre Banks	Sr
DB	36	Marcus McCoy	Fr
LB	37	Philip Strickland	Fr
LB	40	Jacque Roman	Jr
DB	42	Travis Dowda	Jr
DL	44	Quavian Lewis	Jr
LB	45	Coad Westra	So
DL	46	Tony Robertson	Jr
DB	47	Ingram Bell	Fr
LB	48	Brad Hardee	So
LB	49	Terrence McLean	Fr
LB	52	Demery Brewer	Fr
DL	53	Daniel Pratl	So
DL	54	Jabari Fletcher	So
DL	55	Justin Johnson	Jr
DL	56	Bobby Bozzo	So
DL	58	Daniel Finnerty	Jr
LB	65	Mitch Mitchener	So
DL	66	Josh Jurius	Fr
LB	69	Matthew Watson	Fr
DL	91	Malcolm Bennett	Jr
DL	92	Jason Jones	Fr
DL	93	John Rizor	Fr
DL	94	Anthony Wilson	Fr
DL	95	Gordy Witte	Fr
DL	98	Anthony Williams	Jr
DL	99	Lanston Tanyi	Fr
LB		Andrew Ferguson	Fr
LB		Justin Lloyd	Fr
LB		Cougar Norris	Fr
DB		Shawn Rider	Fr
LB		Brandon Thompson	Fr

Special teams

Pos.	#	Name	Class
P	34	Adam Kassouf	Jr
PK	39	Jason Vitaris	So
LS	59	Wilson Fitchett	Fr
P	90	Sam Martin	Fr
P	97	Neil Young	Sr

Head coach

- Jerry Moore (20th season)

Coordinators/assistant coaches

- John Wiley – Defensive Coordinator
- Dale Jones
- Scott Satterfield
- Shawn Elliott
- Chris Moore
- Mark Speir
- Antonio Carter
- Brad Glenn
- Nic Cardwell
- John Holt
- Brad West
- Trey Elder
- Jeff Dillman

Legend

- (C) Team captain
- (S) Suspended
- (I) Ineligible
- Injured
- Redshirt

Roster
Last update: November 30, 2009

== Awards and honors ==
- Walter Payton Award — Armanti Edwards
- Southern Conference Coach of the Year (coaches and media) — Jerry Moore
- Southern Conference Roy M. "Legs" Hawley Offensive Player of the Year (media) — Armanti Edwards
- Southern Conference Offensive Player of the Year (coaches) — Armanti Edwards
- Southern Conference Defensive Player of the Year (coaches) — Jacque Roman

== Statistics ==
=== Team ===
	ASU	Opp
Scoring	522	303
Points per game	37.3	21.6
First downs	304	250
Rushing	156	124
Passing	137	106
Penalty	11	20
Total offense	6,491	4,676
Avg per play	6.8	4.7
Avg per game	463.6	334.0
Fumbles–Lost	30–18	23–8
Penalties–Yards	88–761	79–723
Avg per game	54.4	51.6

	ASU	Opp
Punts–Yards	60–2,352	82–3,181
Avg per punt	39.2	38.8
Time of possession/Game	29:10	30:50
3rd down conversions	81 for 177	68 for 214
4th down conversions	9 for 19	15 for 36
Touchdowns scored	72	39
Field goals–Attempts	8–12	10–17
PAT–Attempts	64–69	37–39
Attendance	201,291	160,876
Games/Avg per Game	8/25,161	6/26,813

==== Scores by quarter ====
	1	2	3	4	Total
Opponents	86	68	88	61	303
Mountaineers	125	159	106	132	522

=== Offense ===
==== Rushing ====
Name	GP–GS	Att	Gain	Loss	Net	Avg	TD	Long	Avg/G
Armanti Edwards	13–13	193	1,169	228	941	4.9	11	76	72.4
Robert Welton	11–5	95	558	14	544	5.7	11	72	49.5
Devin Radford	10–3	75	540	20	520	6.9	4	84	52.0
DeAndre Presley	9–1	73	476	61	415	5.7	7	33	46.1
Josh Jackson	14–2	65	328	11	317	4.9	4	27	22.6
Cedric Baker	10–0	19	186	3	183	9.6	0	40	18.3
Devon Moore	3–2	22	133	10	123	5.6	2	40	41.0
Matt Cline	12–2	20	122	3	119	5.9	0	22	9.9
T. J. Courman	14–9	13	69	1	68	5.2	0	15	4.9
CoCo Hillary	14–12	7	37	8	29	4.1	0	13	2.1
Anthony Cruver	5–0	2	21	0	21	10.5	0	18	4.2
Trey Hennessee	14–0	7	18	5	13	1.9	0	7	0.9
Hunter Stewart	14–0	4	17	13	4	1.0	0	13	0.3
Jason Vitaris	14–0	1	1	0	1	1.0	0	1	0.1
Total	–	604	3,675	465	3,210	5.3	39	84	229.3

==== Passing ====
Name	GP–GS	Effic	Att–Cmp–Int	Pct	Yds	TD	Lng	Avg/G
Armanti Edwards	13–13	170.19	196–306–9	64.1	2,902	30	72	223.2
DeAndre Presley	9–1	147.64	30–45–1	66.7	379	2	58	42.1
CoCo Hillary	14–12	0.00	0–2–0	0.0	0	0	0	0.0
Hunter Stewart	14–0	0.00	0–1–0	0.0	0	0	0	0.0
Total	–	165.88	226–354–10	63.8	3,281	32	72	234.4

==== Receiving ====
Name	GP–GS	No.	Yds	Avg	TD	Long	Avg/G
CoCo Hillary	14–12	56	735	13.1	5	50	52.5
Ben Jorden	14–7	29	506	17.4	6	58	36.1
T. J. Courman	14–9	29	292	10.1	3	48	20.9
Brian Quick	13–4	23	496	21.6	7	58	38.2
Matt Cline	12–2	19	264	13.9	2	35	22.0
Josh Johnson	14–9	16	229	14.3	2	38	16.4
Blake Elder	14–3	13	180	13.8	1	38	12.9
T. Washington	13–1	11	125	11.4	2	44	9.6
B. J. Frazier	14–4	10	120	12.0	1	20	8.6
Robert Welton	11–5	7	86	12.3	1	44	7.8
Devin Radford	10–3	5	178	35.6	2	72	17.8
Josh Jackson	14–2	4	28	7.0	0	13	2.0
Clay McKnight	13–0	2	13	6.5	0	7	1.0
Devon Moore	3–2	1	19	19.0	0	19	6.3
Brad Hardee	13–3	1	10	10.0	0	10	0.8
Total	–	226	3,281	14.5	32	72	234.4

=== Defense ===
Name	GP–GS	Tackles				Sacks	Pass defense		Interceptions				Fumbles		Blkd Kick
Name	GP–GS	Solo	Ast	Total	TFL–Yds	No–Yds	BrUp	QBH	No.–Yds	Avg	TD	Long	Rcv–Yds	FF	Blkd Kick
Jacque Roman	14–14	47	83	130	6.5–30	3.0–23	2	5	2–21	10.5	0	13	4–33	–	–
D. J. Smith	14–14	58	65	123	7.5–21	2.0–8	5	3	–	–	–	–	1–0	–	–
Pierre Banks	14–14	45	53	98	4.0–22	2.0–20	11	2	1–18	18.0	0	18	–	2	–
Cortez Gilbert	14–14	45	27	72	0.5–1	–	17	–	2–0	0	0	0	–	–	1
Mark LeGree	13–13	37	21	58	3.0–19	1.0–13	7	–	10–32	3.2	0	22	–	1	–
A. Williams	14–14	13	42	55	4.5–29	3.0–25	–	4	–	–	–	–	1–11	1	–
Lanston Tanyi	14–9	15	37	52	7.0–28	6.0–25	–	9	–	–	–	–	–	1	–
Ed Gainey	14–10	32	19	51	0.5–0	–	9	–	–	–	–	–	–	–	–
Jabari Fletcher	13–11	21	28	49	12.5–57	6.0–45	2	8	–	–	–	–	–	2	–
Billy Riddle	14–3	20	22	42	1.5–2	–	2	–	–	–	–	–	–	1	–
Malcolm Bennett	13–13	6	31	37	2.0–6	1.0–4	–	2	–	–	–	–	–	1	–
Leonard Love	9–7	18	19	37	2.5–5	–	6	–	1–10	10.0	0	10	–	1	–
Travis Dowda	13–5	20	10	30	4.0–42	–	2	–	3–33	11.0	1	33	–	1	–
Quavian Lewis	13–4	10	18	28	8.0–30	3.0–20	–	3	–	–	–	–	–	2	–
Demery Brewer	13–0	12	11	23	1.0–9	1.0–9	–	–	–	–	–	–	–	–	–
Daniel Finnerty	14–2	4	15	19	4.0–9	–	–	6	–	–	–	–	–	–	–
B. Simpkins	13–0	4	12	16	–	–	–	–	–	–	–	–	–	–	–
Trey Hennessee	14–0	4	10	14	–	–	–	–	–	–	–	–	–	–	–
Brad Hardee	13–3	8	5	13	–	–	–	–	–	–	–	–	–	–	–
Richard Long	14–0	2	9	11	–	–	–	–	–	–	–	–	–	–	–
Jason Jones	13–0	7	4	11	2.5–9	2.0–9	1	2	–	–	–	–	–	–	–
Josh Smith	10–0	5	5	10	–	–	–	–	–	–	–	–	–	1	–
D. McDuffie	3–3	6	4	10	0.5–1	–	3	–	–	–	–	–	–	–	–
Gordy Witte	12–0	5	3	8	2.0–11	1.0–7	–	–	–	–	–	–	–	–	–
Ellis McDowell	5–0	4	3	7	0.5–1	–	–	1	–	–	–	–	–	–	–
Josh Davis	7–0	3	4	7	–	–	–	–	–	–	–	–	–	–	–
Tony Robertson	3–3	5	2	7	2.0–13	1.0–9	–	–	–	–	–	–	–	–	–
Bobby Bozzo	12–0	4	3	7	–	–	–	–	–	–	–	–	–	–	–
Jason Vitaris	14–0	4	2	6	–	–	–	–	–	–	–	–	–	–	–
Cedric Baker	10–0	3	3	6	–	–	–	–	–	–	–	–	–	–	–
Jared Reine	11–1	4	1	5	–	–	–	–	–	–	–	–	–	–	–
Daniel Kilgore	14–13	2	2	4	–	–	–	–	–	–	–	–	–	–	–
Wilson Fitchett	14–0	–	4	4	–	–	–	–	–	–	–	–	–	–	–
Orry Frye	11–4	1	1	2	–	–	–	–	–	–	–	–	–	–	–
Justin Johnson	3–0	1	1	2	0.5–0	–	–	–	–	–	–	–	–	–	–
Mario Acitelli	14–14	–	2	2	–	–	–	–	–	–	–	–	–	–	–
Brandon Olsen	2–0	1	1	2	–	–	–	–	–	–	–	–	–	–	–
Brad Coley	14–14	1	–	1	–	–	–	–	–	–	–	–	–	–	–
Dominick Magazu	8–0	1	-	1	–	–	–	–	–	–	–	–	–	–	–
Brian Quick	13–4	1	–	1	–	–	–	–	–	–	–	–	–	–	–
Neil Young	14–0	–	1	1	–	–	–	–	–	–	–	–	–	–	–
Mitch Mitchener	2–0	–	1	1	–	–	–	–	–	–	–	–	–	–	–
Clay McKnight	13–0	–	1	1	–	–	–	–	–	–	–	–	2–0	–	–
Coad Westra	3–0	1	–	1	–	–	1	–	–	–	–	–	–	–	–
Daniel Pratl	3–1	–	1	1	–	–	1	–	–	–	–	–	–	–	–
J. Bieschke	14–13	–	1	1	–	–	–	–	–	–	–	–	–	–	–
Total	–	480	587	1,067	77–345	32–216	69	45	19–114	6.0	1	33	8–44	14	1

=== Special teams ===
Name	Punting								Kickoffs				
Name	No.	Yds	Avg	Long	TB	FC	I20	Blkd	No.	Yds	Avg	TB	OB
Neil Young	55	2,232	0.6	56	5	12	14	1	1	44	44.0	0	0
T. J. Courman	2	55	27.5	34	1	0	1	0	–	–	–	–	–
Adam Kassouf	1	44	44.0	44	0	0	0	0	–	–	–	–	–
DeAndre Presley	1	21	21.0	21	0	0	0	0	–	–	–	–	–
TEAM	1	0	0.0	0	0	0	0	0	–	–	–	–	–
Jason Vitaris	–	–	–	–	–	–	–	–	93	5,344	57.5	9	3
Total	60	2,352	39.2	56	6	12	15	1	94	5,388	57.3	9	3

Name	Punt returns					Kick returns				
Name	No.	Yds	Avg	TD	Long	No.	Yds	Avg	TD	Long
B. J. Frazier	29	183	6.3	0	28	–	–	–	–	–
Josh Johnson	7	47	6.7	0	26	–	–	–	–	–
CoCo Hillary	–	–	–	–	–	30	701	23.4	0	48
Richard Long	–	–	–	–	–	8	129	16.1	0	26
Devin Radford	–	–	–	–	–	3	39	13.0	0	20
Matt Cline	–	–	–	–	–	1	19	19.0	0	19
Blake Elder	–	–	–	–	–	1	0	0.0	0	0
Travis Dowda	–	–	–	–	–	1	17	17.0	0	17
Tim Frye	–	–	–	–	–	1	-3	-3.0	0	0
Total	36	230	6.4	0	28	45	902	20.0	0	48
