= 2008 Bryant Bulldogs football team =

American college football season

2008 Bryant Bulldogs football
- Conference: Independent
- Record: 7–4
- Head coach: Marty Fine (5th season)
- Offensive scheme: Multiple
- Defensive coordinator: Greg Gigantino (2nd season)
- Base defense: 4–3
- Home stadium: Bulldog Stadium

2008 NCAA Division I FCS independents football standings
	Conf.			Overall
Team	W		L	W		L
Bryant		–		7	–	4
Savannah State		–		5	–	7
Marist		–		4	–	7
North Carolina Central		–		4	–	7
Iona		–		3	–	8

The 2008 Bryant Bulldogs football team represented Bryant University as an independent during the 2008 NCAA Division I FCS football season. The Bulldogs were led by sixth-year head coach Marty Fine and played their home games at Bulldog Stadium. This was the first season in which Bryant competed at the NCAA Division I FCS level. The Bulldogs had previously played at the NCAA Division II level as a member of the Northeast-10 Conference. They finished the season with a record of 7–4.

== Schedule ==
Date	Time	Opponent	Site	Result	Attendance
August 30	1:00 pm	at Central Connecticut State	Arute Field; New Britain, CT	L 35–42	4,812
September 6	1:00 pm	No. 20 (D-II) Southern Connecticut State	Bulldog Stadium; Smithfield, RI	W 39–36	4,417
September 13	1:00 pm	Merrimack^{†}	Bulldog Stadium; Smithfield, RI	W 20–7	5,530
September 20	1:00 pm	Monmouth	Bulldog Stadium; Smithfield, RI	L 17–30	4,107
September 27	1:00 pm	at Wagner	Wagner College Stadium; Staten Island, NY	W 24-14	2,467
October 11	8:00 pm	at Marist	Leonidoff Field; Poughkeepsie, NY	L 7–34	4,347
October 18	1:00 pm	Robert Morris	Bulldog Stadium; Smithfield, RI	W 20–7	5,630
October 25	3:00 pm	at No. 17 UMass	Warren McGuirk Alumni Stadium; Hadley, MA	L 7–42	12,251
November 1	12:00 pm	Duquesne	Bulldog Stadium; Smithfield, RI	W 24–10	5,104
November 15	1:00 pm	at Iona	Mazzella Field; New Rockhelle, NY	W 23–7	483
November 22	1:00 pm	at St. Francis (PA)	DeGol Field; Loretto, PA	W 23–0	885
^{†}Homecoming; Rankings from The Sports Network Poll released prior to the game; All times are in Eastern time

== Game summaries ==
=== Central Connecticut State ===
	1	2	3	4	Total
Bulldogs	3	10	0	22	35
Blue Devils	7	14	0	21	42

If there were any questions as to whether the Bryant University football team was ready for Division I, Saturday's effort at Central Connecticut provided all the answers. Facing a talented Blue Devil team in the school's season opener, Bryant pushed Central Connecticut before coming up short, 42-35 Saturday night at Arute Field.

Bryant (0-1) trailed 21-13 at the half, but roared back as the Bulldog defense kept the Blue Devil offense in check for most of the second half. A Lindsey Gamble 24-yard run down to the Central 33-yard line early in the fourth helped set up a 15-yard touchdown pass from quarterback Jay Graber to Michael Canfora, trimming the lead Central lead down to two, 21-19. Going for the two-point conversion, Graber hit Vinton South across the middle to complete the 2-point conversion and tie the game at 21-21.

Another strong defensive stop forced Central into another three and out by the Blue Devil offense. But on the ensuing punt, the Blue Devils failed to get the punt off and the Bulldogs took over deep in the Central Connecticut territory. Three plays later, Gamble rumbled in from a yard out and the Bulldogs took their first lead of the game.

James Mallory finally gave Central Connecticut (1-0) fans something to cheer for in the second half as he broke free down the left side line for a 92-yard touchdown run to knot the game back up at 28-28.

Special teams play haunted the Bulldogs and after failing to pick up a first down, Central managed to block another Bulldog punt and Cory Robinson fell on the ball in the end zone to push the Blue Devils back out in front 35-28.

Bryant would answer again, however, as Canfora and Graber hooked up again for a 15-yard touchdown to tie the game at 35-35.

Central Connecticut opened the game blocking a Bryant punt on the Bulldogs' opening drive in the first quarter as Jordan Knight picked up the loose ball and ran it back 22 yards for the game's first score.

Chris Bird had a strong performance, kicking a 37-yard field goal in the first half and setting a school record with a 47-yard field goal before halftime to make it 21–13. Bryant gained an extra opportunity after a facemask penalty on Central Connecticut extended the half, and Bird narrowly converted the kick just inside the uprights.

=== Southern Connecticut State ===
	1	2	3	4	Total
Owls	0	14	14	8	36
Bulldogs	7	7	7	18	39

Junior running back Jerell Smith rushed for a career-high 221 yards on 34 carries to help lead Bryant University to a 39-36 non-conference win over Southern Connecticut before 2,417 at Bulldog Stadium Saturday afternoon. The win improves Bryant's record to 1-1 on the season heading into next week's home game with Merrimack College (1 p.m.). Southern Connecticut drops to 1-1 on the season.

In the first matchup between the two schools since last year's NCAA playoffs, won by the Owls 45-28, the Bulldogs capitalized on several Southern Connecticut mistakes to pull out the fourth quarter, come-from-behind victory.

"If we don't keep the ball in the shoot, they are going to run away from us, and that's what happened today," said Bryant coach Marty Fine.

Southern Connecticut (1-1), ranked 20th in Division II and picked to win the Northeast-10 Conference this season, got a strong passing effort from quarterback Steve Armstrong. The senior signal caller was 17 for 23 passing for 282 yards and threw three touchdowns before leaving the game with an injury early in the third.

Armstrong's replacement Kevin Lynch came on to throw a pair of touchdowns, including a 75-yarder to Ty Marshall to vive the Owls a 28-21 lead with 3:30 left in the third.

But in the fourth quarter, key plays by the Bryant defense and special teams and the hard running of Smith, helped Bryant rally. A Samad Wagstaff interception near midfield as the quarter came to a close resulted in a Smith 10-yard touchdown. On the ensuing kickoff, Southern fumbled the return and Bryant's Franck Tebou was there to recover. That play led to another Smith touchdown, making it 33-28 with 13:17 left.

Another fumble on the kickoff by the Owls gave the ball back to the Bulldogs and this time Mike Canfora was there to bull his way in from the 1-yard line to put Bryant on top 39-28.

Lynch and the Owls were done, as the freshman connected with Pete Digangi for a 6-yard score to pull to within 39-36 with 7:53 remaining.

Bryant was forced to punt after the drive stalled out at their own 34-yard line, but on Southern's next possession, linebacker Paul Polomski picked off a Lynch pass at the 45-yard line and the Bulldogs were able to run out the clock.

Smith's 221 yards are a career-high for the Howard University transfer and the seventh-most yards in a game, tying him with Lorenzo Perry who had 221 at Assumption in 2008.

Quarterback Jay Graber completed 13 of 25 passes for 164 yards and two touchdowns while Vinton South caught three passes for 64 yards.

"Southern Connecticut is a good team and they deserve all of their credit," said Jay Graber. "They beat us pretty bad last year so it wasn't a Division I, Division II thing, it was a good football game."

Ty Marshall had seven catches for 203 yards and two scores for Southern Connecticut . Jarom Freeman, who rushed for an NCAA Division II record 418 yards against the Bulldogs last year, was held in check by the Bulldog defense. The junior finished with 70 yards on 16 carries in the game.

Bryce Martins had 11 tackles on the season while Andre White added seven.

=== Merrimack ===
	1	2	3	4	Total
Warriors	0	0	0	7	7
Bulldogs	3	14	0	3	20

Junior tailback Jerell Smith (Brooklyn, NY) rushed for 130 yards on 27 carries to lift the Bryant University football team to a 20-7 non-conference win over Merrimack College before an overflow crowd of 5,530 fans on Homecoming & Reunion Weekend Saturday at Bulldog Stadium.

Bryant, with the win, improves to 2-1 on the season heading into next weekend's home game with Monmouth College (1 p.m.). Merrimack, which turned the ball over seven times in the game, drops to 1-1.

The Bulldogs, who forced seven turnovers in last week's win over Southern Connecticut, took advantage of an early miscue by the Warriors to get on the board first. A Paul Polomski (Franklin, MA) interception of a Kurt Leone pass midway through the first quarter led to a 31-yard field goal by Chris Bird, giving the Bulldogs a 3-0 lead.

Bryant would never trail again. In the second quarter, another interception, this time by Bryant freshman cornerback Samad Wagstaff (New Rochelle, NY), off a pass by Leone helped set up the Bulldogs' first touchdown of the game. Wagstaff, who added another interception in the second half to give him five for the season, returned his first of the day 20 yards to midfield, giving the Bulldogs excellent field position.

Seven plays later, Lindsey Gamble (Roxbury, MA) plunged in from a yard out to make it 10-7.

Smith would add a 20-yard touchdown run in the final minute of the second quarter to send the Bulldogs into the locker room up 20-0 at the break.

Smith, after a career-best 221 yards against Southern Connecticut last week, went over the 1,000 yard mark in his career Saturday. His 130 yards against Merrimack gives him 1,063 yards, becoming the seventh player in school history to go over 1,000 yards rushing in a career.

Bryant quarterback Jay Graber (Clarksburg, NJ) completed 14 of 22 passes for 117 yards while Ross Giffune (Foxboro, MA) had a fine day, catching four passes for 43 yards including a long of 17.

In addition to forcing seven turnovers, Bryant's defense held Merrimack's run-and-shoot offense to 278 yards in the game. Leone finished the game completing 12 of 36 passes for 143 yards. Backup Mike Sarnese came on later in the second half to replace Leone and completed 4 of 14 attempts for 84 yards but was intercepted three times including once in the end zone by Andre Whyte (Bennington, VT).

=== Monmouth ===
	1	2	3	4	Total
Hawks	7	10	0	13	30
Bulldogs	7	0	3	7	17

Senior running back David Sinisi rushed for 171 yards on 26 carries and scored twice as visiting Monmouth earned its first victory of the season defeating Bryant University 30-17 in non-conference football action Saturday before 4,107 at Bulldog Stadium.

Monmouth (1-3) got on the board first as quarterback Brett Burke found John Nalbone for a 6 yard score on the Hawks' second drive of the game. But Bryant would come right back as quarterback Jay Graber engineered a 12-play, 81-yard drive capped by a Jarrett Solimando 5-yard touchdown reception to tie the game up at 7-7 in the first. It was Bryant's longest scoring drive of the season.

A Fred Weingart 20-yard field goal and a 3-yard touchdown run by Bobby Giles in the second quarter gave the visitors a 17-7 halftime lead.

Bryant (2-2) managed to trim the lead thanks in part to a 19-yard field goal by Chris Bird, but Sinisi and the Hawks put the game away in the fourth with two quick scores, the second coming on a big defensive stop. Sinisi scored the first of his two rushing touchdowns on the day with a 2-yard run up the middle at the start of the final quarter to make it 23-10.

Looking to counter, the Bulldogs moved the ball deep into Monmouth territory thanks an impressive 10-play drive. But with the ball on the Hawks' 8-yard line, Graber was intercepted by linebacker T.J. Cerezo in the end zone for a touchback and the Bulldogs came away empty-handed.

Three plays later, Sinisi broke through for a game-clinching 70-yard touchdown run down the middle to make it 30-10 and the Hawks never looked back. Sinisi entered the game averaging 133 yards rushing .

Graber finished with 261 yards passing on the day and two touchdowns. Anthony DiNaso caught 5 passes for 70 yards while Ross Giffune and Solimando also added five catches for 45 and 42 yards receiving respectively

=== Wagner ===
	1	2	3	4	Total
Bulldogs	7	10	7	0	24
Seahawks	7	0	0	7	14

Bryant tailback Jerell Smith (Brooklyn, NY) rushed for 143 yards on 31 carries and the Bulldog defense turned in one of its finest games of the season as the Bulldogs knocked off Wagner College 24-14 Saturday.

The win is Bryant's first over a Division I opponent in six tries and the first this season over a member of the Football Championship Subdivision (Bryant defeated DII Merrimack and Southern Connecticut earlier this year).

"We did a good job on defense today and got a couple of big plays right when we needed it," said Bryant coach Marty Fine following the game. "The defense really made some things happen and we were able to stay to our game plan and come out with a great win today."

Jay Graber completed 8 of 17 passes including a clutch 20 yard while Lindsey Gamble added 44 yards rushing in the victory.

But the story of the day was the play of the Bulldog defense that held Wagner to just 219 yards of offense - including 100 yards through three quarters - before 2,467 on a wet and dreary day at Wagner College Stadium.

Bryant overcame a pair of fumbles on punt returns in the game, but made the plays when they had to. It didn't hurt much in that Wagner's offense struggled against the Bryant defense all afternoon.

Wagner did strike first as quarterback Adam Farnsworth hit tight end Peter Zagorski with a short pass but the senior was able to break a few tackles and rumbled down the home side line for an 80-yard score. But the play was the only highlight on the day for the Seahawks who were penalized seven times in the game - including several unnecessary roughness penalties.

But the Bulldog defense, coming into the game shorthanded with several starters out of the game, stormed right back to take command of the game.

An Andre Whyte block of a Kyle Muir punt attempt was recovered by Anthony Castelli who returned it 4 yards to tie the game at 7-7.

Later in the first, free safety Bryce Martins helped set up the go-ahead score intercepting Adam Farnsworth inside the Wagner 20-yard line and returning it to the 15. One play later, Lindsey Gamble scored from four yards out to make it 14-7.

The wet conditions caused more special teams trouble for Wagner as Muir couldn't handle another snap on a punt attempt and the Bulldogs took over near midfield.

Bryant was able to drive down to the Wagner 3-yard line, aided by a beautiful pass from Graber to tight end Jarrett Solimando across the middle. But the Bulldogs couldn't get into the end zone but did come away with three points on a Chris Bird 20-yard field goal to make it 17-7.

The Bulldogs opened the second half with an efficient 8 play, 46-yard drive capped by a Graber 7-yard touchdown pass to Staten Island, N.Y. native Anthony DiNaso to make it 24-7.

Another defensive surge helped put the game away in the waning minutes. With the Seahawks driving late in the fourth, a Samad Wagstaff blitz from the blind side forced an errant pass by backup quarterback Matt Abbey as John Suarez picked off Abbey and returned the ball deep into Wagner territory.

Martins led the way with six tackles while Paul Polomski (Franklin, MA) had five tackles. Defensive end Don Smith (Attleboro, MA) had a huge day, finishing with five tackles plus two big sacks.

"It was a special day for him (Smith) today and for the entire team," added Fine.

=== Marist ===
	1	2	3	4	Total
Bulldogs	0	0	0	7	7
Red Foxes	7	6	7	14	34

Quarterback Chris Debowski completed 15 of 28 passes for 321 yards and four touchdowns to lead host Marist College to a 34-7 win over Bryant Saturday evening at Tenney Stadium snapping a three-game losing skid for the Red Foxes.

After Bryant's opening drive stalled, Marist (2-5) wasted little time to get off and running as Debowski connected with speedy receiver James LaMacchia for an 80-yard touchdown pass on the Red Foxes' very first play of the game. It would be the first of two deep touchdown passes to LaMacchia who finished with four receptions for 154 yards.

Bryant (3-3) moved the ball well in the first half, picking up eight first downs but the Bulldogs were unable to get on the scoreboard as Marist ended Bryant's best scoring chance of the half by intercepting a Jay Graber pass at the goal line.

Two Kevin Pauly field goals of 38 and 25 yards rounded out the first half scoring as Marist led 13-0 at the half.

The Bulldogs were poised to get on the scoreboard on their first possession to start the second half thanks to the hard running of tailback Lindsey Gamble. The junior energized Bryant's opening drive with several dazzling runs to get the ball inside the Marist 20-yard line, but once again Bryant came up empty as Chris Bird's 25-yard field goal attempt sailed wide.

On the ensuing possession, Marist again used another big play to break the game wide open as Debowski hooked up once again with LaMacchia down the right sideline for a 56-yard score to make it 20-0. Debowski would add another 15-yard touchdown pass to R.J. Roe to make it 27-0 before Gamble got Bryant on the board with a 7-yard run up the middle to make it 27-7 with 10:52 left in the game.

Gamble finished with 100 yards on 20 carries in the game while Jerell Smith added 94-yard rushing. It was Gambles third 100-yard rushing game of his career. Graber completed 11 of 15 passes for 119 yards. Paul Polomski (Franklin, MA) had eight tackles while Jason Riffe and Don Smith (Attleboro, MA) had seven and six respectively.

=== Robert Morris ===
	1	2	3	4	Total
Colonials	0	0	0	7	7
Bulldogs	7	0	7	6	20

Jerell Smith (Brooklyn, NY) rushed for 104 yards on 16 carries while Anthony DiNaso (Staten Island, NY) caught a pair of touchdown passes to lead Bryant University to a 20-7 win over visiting Robert Morris University before a standing-room only crowd of 5,630 at Bulldog Stadium Saturday afternoon.

Scored on its first possession of the game and let the defense handle the rest as Bryant held the Colonials to minus-20 yards rushing on the ground and sacked quarterback Erik Cwalinski eight times, tying a school record.

Bryant (4-3) used a good balance attack in starting quickly as the Bulldogs opened with a 66-yard drive on its first possession to take a quick 7-0 lead. Lindsey Gamble (Roxbury, MA) helped keep the drive moving with a nice 19-yard pickup to move the ball down inside the Colonial 20-yard line.

Three players later, quarterback Jay Graber hit DiNaso for the first of his two touchdowns on the day as the senior quarterback connected with the sophomore receiver across the middle for with a third-down pass across the middle for a 13-yard touchdown with 12:16 left in the first quarter.

It would be the only scoring of the first half, but the Bulldogs would take advantage of a crucial turnover by Robert Morris, the first of only two in the game. After forcing the Bulldogs to punt on their first possession, Robert Morris (2-5) took over with good field position near midfield. But on the ensuing possession, RMU running back Myles Russ fumbled the hand-off and Don Smith (Attleboro, MA) was there to recover.

Bryant would take full advantage of the momentum swing as Smith found a seam in the defensive line on the very next play and raced down the right sideline for a 37-yard touchdown to make it 14-0.

Graber and DiNaso would hook up again in the fourth, this time on a 19-yard pass play in the corner of the end zone to make it 20-0. Cwalinski would help RMU avoid the shutout as the senior scored from 11 yards out to round out the scoring on the day.

DiNaso finished with three catches for 54 yards while teammate Ross Giffune (Foxboro, MA) also had three receptions for 58 yards. Russ, who came into the game averaging 145 yards rushing per game, was held to just 37 on the day. Cwalinski completed 11 of 25 passes for 161 yards for Robert Morris.

But the story of the day was the Bryant defense that held a Colonial team averaging 340 yards of offense to only 141 Saturday. Pat Gauthier (Woonsocket, RI) had 7 tackles plus accounted for three of Bryant's eight sacks. Andre Whyte (Bennington, VT) and Andrew Regan (West Newbury, MA) each had five tackles. Freshman Mike McGowan (Attleboro, MA / Bishop Feehan) had a big day in his first start at cornerback. McGowan had a pair of tackles and led the team with three pass breakups.

=== UMass ===
	1	2	3	4	Total
Bulldogs	7	0	0	0	7
Minutemen	21	14	7	0	42

UMass quarterback Liam Coen completed 11 of 18 passes for 389 yards and five touchdowns to lead the No. 17 Minutemen to a 42-7 win over visiting Bryant University Saturday afternoon.

UMass (5-3), looking to bounce back strong from last week's loss to Richmond, did just that Saturday as the Minutemen scored on their first three possessions before the Bulldogs finally got on the board mid-way through the first quarter.

Trailing 21-0, the Bulldogs (4-4) put together a solid scoring drive despite the loss of starting quarterback Jay Graber (Clarksburg, NJ). Graber, who left with 4:50 left in the opening quarter with an injury and did not return, was replaced by backup Kurt Spear (Greene, NY). The junior, seeing action for the first time this season, stepped right in and guided the Bulldogs down field with a solid scoring drive. Spear completed 3 of 4 passes including a 16-yarder to Mike Canfora for 16 yards on his first pass attempt.

A 15-yard pass to Ross Giffune (Foxboro, MA) moved the ball down to the UMass 22-yard line. Behind steady blocking by the offensive line up front, junior tailback Lindsey Gamble (Roxbury, MA) moved the ball down to 6 and one play later found a seam into the end zone to make it 21-7 just before the end of the opening quarter.

The 16-play drive covered 6 minutes, 41 seconds - the longest scoring drive of the season for the Bulldogs.

UMass would answer as Tony Nelson scored from 3 yards out and Jeremy Horne was on the receiving end of a 21-yard pass from Coen to make it 35-7 at the half and the hosts cruised from there. Horne finished with 182 yards and three touchdowns while Korrey Davis rushed for 54 yards on 12 carries.

UMass finished the day with 593 yards of total offense including 448 yards through the air. Bryant had 217 yards of offense in the game. Spear finished the day completing 7 of 17 passes for 70 yards with Giffune hauling in three catches for 27 yards. Mike Canfora had two catches for 25 yards. Jerell Smith (Brooklyn, NY) rushed for 56 of Bryant's 126 yards on the ground while Gamble finished with 52 yards on 17 carries.

Sophomore Addison Lynch (Braintree, MA) recorded a career-best 12 tackles to lead Bryant defensively. Junior linebacker Paul Polomski (Franklin, MA) added 10 tackles as the Bulldog defense recovered three UMass fumbles, all in the second half.

Punter Brian Donnelly (East Dennis, MA) punted a school-record 12 times for 441 yards.

=== Duquesne ===
	1	2	3	4	Total
Dukes	3	0	7	0	10
Bulldogs	0	6	3	15	24

Bryant University running back Jerell Smith rushed for 129 yards on 14 carries while the defense used two fourth quarter interceptions to put the game away as the host Bulldogs pulled away for a 24-10 win over Duquesne here Saturday afternoon.

Duquesne quarterback Connor Dixon engineered a solid 10-play scoring drive to open the game as the Dukes jumped out in front first. A Dixon 20-yard pass to Brian Layhue on the Dukes' second-play moved the ball to midfield. Dixon would later hook up with running back Cleo Williams for an 11-yard pass play to move the ball down to the Bryant 25-yard line. With the ball on the Bryant 7-yard line, the Bulldog defense would hold Duquesne to a 24-yard field goal from Mark Troyan.

Bryant's (5-4) offense would finally get on the board just before halftime. After a 21-yard punt by Duquesne's Josh Brisk gave the Bulldogs good field position at the Duquesne 44-yard line, quarterback Jay Graber (Clarksburg, NJ) hit Ross Giffune (Foxboro, MA) for a 20-yard gain down to the Duquesne 15-yard line. Two plays later, Mike Canfora (Verona, NJ) took a lateral from Graber and rumbled into the end zone for a 15-yard score. The extra point attempt was wide and the Bulldogs took a 6-3 lead into the locker room at the half.

Duquesne (2-6) regained the lead once again late in the third as Dixon connected with Alex Roberson for a 54-yard touchdown pass to make it 10-9.

But in the fourth, Lindsey Gamble put the Bulldogs back in front for good, scoring on a 29-yard run down the middle to make it 15-10. On their next possession, the Dukes moved the ball down to the Bryant 40, but junior defensive end Don Smith (Attleboro, MA) blitzed Dixon forcing the sophomore to throw an ill-advised pass that was picked off by linebacker Paul Polomski (Franklin, MA).

The Bulldogs came into the game tied for first nationally with a 25 turnovers gained this season. The Duquesne miscue led to a Brian Donnelly (East Dennis, MA) 25-yard field goal to give Bryant an 18-10 lead with just over five minutes left.

Needing to go the length of the field to score and possibly force overtime, Duquesne would never get the opportunity as Bryant linebacker Cheyenne Ray (Bellport, NY) picked off Dixon's very first pass attempt at the 29-yard line and returned it the distance for the touchdown, sealing the victory for the Bulldogs.

Bryant finished with 445 yards of total offense in the game. The Bulldogs were 7 for 15 on third-down conversions. Gamble finished with 94 yards rushing while Graber completed 18 of 26 passes for 213 yards. Williams finished with 76 yards rushing for Duquesne while Dixon was 16 for 28 passing for 193 yards.

=== Iona ===
	1	2	3	4	Total
Bulldogs	0	0	9	14	23
Gaels	7	0	0	0	7

Lindsey Gamble (Roxbury, MA) rushed for a season-high 163 yards on 15 carries to lead the Bryant University football team to a 23-7 win over Iona College Saturday at a wet and rainy Mazzella Field. The win clinches a winning record for the Bulldogs in their first season of Division I football as Bryant will take a 6-4 record into next Saturday's season finale at Saint Francis (PA).

Coming off a bye week, the Bulldogs were slow out of the gate and Iona (3-8) took advantage, scoring the only points of the first half late in the first quarter. Gael freshman quarterback Warren Smith engineered an 11-play drive ending with a 33-yard touchdown pass to the speedy Tim Mastrino for a 7-0 lead.

Held scoreless for only the second time this season, Bryant managed just 55 yards rushing in the first half against an Iona defense that came into the game allowing 300 yards rushing.

But it was a different story in the second half as quarterback Jay Graber (Clarksburg, NJ) led Bryant on a 10-play scoring drive to open the third quarter. The senior connected with senior tight end Jarrett Solimando (Demarest, NJ) on an 18-yard pass play down to the one-yard line. One play later, junior tailback Jerrell Smith (Brooklyn, NY) dove into the end-zone to finally put Bryant on the scoreboard. Iona would maintain the lead however, as the point after attempt was wide, keeping Gaels in front 7-6.

But the scoring drive was just what the team needed. Chris Bird's (Monument Beach, MA) 30-yard field goal atoned for the missed extra point try and the Bulldogs had their first lead of the game, 9-7 with 4:24 left in the third.

Still within striking distance, the Gaels continued to move the ball well led by the arm of Warren Smith and the play of Mastrino. But the key play of the game came early in the fourth with the Gaels driving deep into Bryant territory. With the ball on the Bryant 25, and Iona facing a fourth-and-three, Attleboro's Don Smith pressured Warren Smith to scramble out of the pocket and throw an incomplete pass with Andre Whyte (Bennington, Vt.) covering.

Taking over on downs, Gamble broke through the line on Bryant's very first play from scrimmage and raced 75 yards for a touchdown to make it 16-7. With the momentum clearly back in Bryant's favor, Jerrell Smith would later add a 50-yard touchdown run of his own and the Bulldogs never looked back.

With his 163 yards on the day, Gamble moved into fourth all-time in school history with 1,704 rushing yards. Jerrell Smith, who surpassed the 1,000-yard mark for the season on Bryant's first play of game, finished with 105 yards on the ground, moving him into third-place all-time in school history with 1,723 yards.

Anthony DiNaso (Staten Island, NY) had four catches for 64 yards while Bryce Martins (Uncasville, CT) led the defense with 11 tackles. Patrick Gauthier (Woonsocket, RI) and Smith each had seven.

Iona's quarterback Smith completed 31 of 53 passes for 272 yards. Mastrino finished an amazing day for the Gaels, catching a school record 18 passes for 167 yards.

=== St. Francis (PA) ===
	1	2	3	4	Total
Bulldogs	7	3	7	6	23
Red Flash	0	0	0	0	0

Jerell Smith rushed 150 yards and quarterback Jay Graber threw three touchdown passes as the Bulldogs rolled to a 23-0 win over Saint Francis (PA) on a snowy afternoon at DeGol Field. The win concludes Bryant's first Division I season with a 7-4 record.

The Bulldogs out-gained the Red Flash 382 to 58 in total yards as Graber completed 14 of 19 passes for 160 yards on the day. Ross Giffune hauled in four catches for 59 yards and it was his first touchdown reception of the season that got the Bulldogs on the board first.

Bryant put together a nice looking drive right away on its first possession. Hard running from Lindsey Gamble helped move the ball down to the Red Flash eight-yard line, setting up an 8-yard, Graber to Giffune touchdown pass in the back of the end zone to make it 7-0.

Two fumbles halted a pair of other Bryant drives in the second quarter but the Bulldogs were able add on a 32-yard field goal by Chris Bird just before the end of the half to take a 10-0 lead into the locker room at the break. The field goal was the 15th in the career for Bird, tying Pete DiMartino's school record.

The Bulldog defense enjoyed an outstanding first half, holding Saint Francis to just 12 yards of offense and only one pass completion.

In the second half, the Bulldogs stretched the lead to 17-0 as Graber connected with wide receiver Vinton South for a 33-yard score with 1:19 left in the third. The scoring drive covered 10 plays and took off more than five minutes on the clock.

Graber and the Bulldogs would put the game away midway through the fourth as the senior signal caller threw his third touchdown pass of the game, this time to Tyler DiGiovanni. The point after was wide but the point didn't matter as the Bulldogs managed to end the season with a win for the first time since the 2000 season and just the second time in the 10-year history of the program.
