= 2008 Saint Francis Red Flash football team =

American college football season

2008 Saint Francis Red Flash football
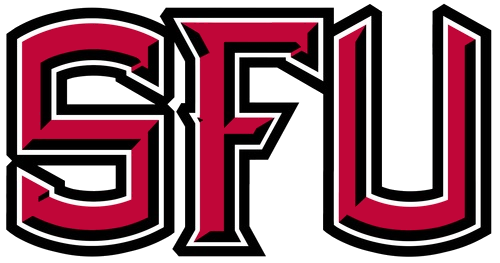
- Conference: Northeast Conference
- Record: 0–11 (0–7 NEC)
- Head coach: Dave Opfar (7th season)
- Home stadium: DeGol Field

2008 Northeast Conference football standings
	Conf.			Overall
Team	W		L	W		L
Albany $	7	–	0	9	–	3
Monmouth	6	–	1	7	–	5
Sacred Heart	4	–	3	8	–	3
Central Connecticut State	4	–	3	7	–	4
Robert Morris	4	–	3	5	–	6
Duquesne	2	–	5	3	–	7
Wagner	1	–	6	3	–	8
Saint Francis (PA)	0	–	7	0	–	11
$ – Conference champion

The 2008 Saint Francis Red Flash football team represented Saint Francis University as a member of the Northeast Conference (NEC) during the 2008 NCAA Division I FCS football season. The Red Flash were led by seventh-year head coach Dave Opfar and played their home games at DeGol Field. They finished the season 0–11 overall and 0–7 in NEC play to place last.

== Schedule ==
Date	Time	Opponent	Site	Result	Attendance
September 6	1:30 p.m.	at VMI*	Alumni Memorial Field; Lexington, VA	L 0–49	5,123
September 13	1:00 p.m.	Marist*	DeGol Field; Loretto, PA	L 22–30	1,428
September 20	7:00 p.m.	at Duquesne	Rooney Field; Pittsburgh, PA	L 7–21	2,454
September 27	1:00 p.m.	at Morehead State*	Jayne Stadium; Morehead, KY	L 21–36	5,783
October 4	1:00 p.m.	at Monmouth	Kessler Field; West Long Branch, NJ	L 15–42	2,813
October 11	1:00 p.m.	Sacred Heart	DeGol Field; Loretto, PA	L 24–41	750
October 18	1:00 p.m.	Wagner	DeGol Field; Loretto, PA	L 13–17	1,023
October 25	4:00 p.m.	at Albany	University Field; Albany, NY	L 3–27	5,284
November 8	12:00 p.m.	at Central Connecticut State	Arute Field; New Britain, CT	L 0–36	3,069
November 15	1:00 p.m.	Robert Morris	DeGol Field; Loretto, PA	L 20–35	943
November 22	1:00 p.m.	Bryant	DeGol Field; Loretto, PA	L 0–23	885
*Non-conference game; All times are in Eastern time
