= 2008 Charleston Southern Buccaneers football team =

American college football season

2008 Charleston Southern Buccaneers football
- Conference: Big South Conference
- Record: 7–5 (3–2 Big South)
- Head coach: Jay Mills (6th season)
- Offensive coordinator: Jamey Chadwell (5th season)
- Defensive coordinator: Thielen Smith (1st season)
- Home stadium: Buccaneer Field

2008 Big South Conference football standings
	Conf.			Overall
Team	W		L	W		L
No. 14 Liberty $	5	–	0	10	–	2
Stony Brook	3	–	2	5	–	6
Charleston Southern	3	–	2	7	–	5
Gardner–Webb	2	–	3	5	–	6
Coastal Carolina	1	–	4	6	–	6
VMI	1	–	4	4	–	7
Presbyterian	1	–	4	4	–	8
$ – Conference champion; Rankings from The Sports Network poll

The 2008 Charleston Southern Buccaneers football team represented Charleston Southern University as a member of the Big South Conference during the 2008 NCAA Division I FCS football season. Led by sixth-year head coach Jay Mills, the Buccaneers compiled an overall record of 7–5 with a mark of 3–2 in conference play, tying for second place in the Big South.

== Schedule ==
Date	Time	Opponent	Site	TV	Result	Attendance	Source
August 28	7:30 pm	at Miami (FL)*	Dolphin Stadium; Miami Gardens, FL	ESPN360	L 7–52	48,119	
September 6	6:00 pm	at No. 13 Wofford*	Gibbs Stadium; Spartanburg, SC		L 23–41	3,817	
September 13	3:00 pm	at Miami (OH)*	Yager Stadium; Oxford, OH		L 27–38	13,833	
September 27	1:30 pm	North Greenville*	Buccaneer Field; Charleston, SC		W 27–0	2,541	
October 4	1:30 pm	Gardner–Webb	Buccaneer Field; Charleston, SC		W 13–10	3,144	
October 11	2:00 pm	at Savannah State*	Memorial Stadium; Savannah, GA		W 29–20	3,457	
October 18	3:00 pm	at Stony Brook	Kenneth P. LaValle Stadium; Stony Brook, NY	Big South Net	L 19–20	5,544	
October 25	3:30 pm	at No. 20 Liberty	Williams Stadium; Lynchburg, VA		L 0–42	14,365	
November 1	1:30 pm	VMI	Buccaneer Field; Charleston, SC		W 31–21	3,213	
November 8	1:30 pm	Presbyterian	Buccaneer Field; Charleston, SC		W 29–18	3,291	
November 15	1:30 pm	Edward Waters*	Buccaneer Field; Charleston, SC		W 48–6	2,434	
November 22	6:00 pm	at Coastal Carolina	Brooks Stadium; Conway, SC		W 24–0	5,648	
*Non-conference game; Rankings from The Sports Network Poll released prior to the game; All times are in Eastern time
