= 2008 Chattanooga Mocs football team =

American college football season

2008 Chattanooga Mocs football
- Conference: Southern Conference
- Record: 1–11 (0–8 SoCon)
- Head coach: Rodney Allison (6th season)
- Offensive coordinator: Carmen Felus (3rd season)
- Defensive coordinator: Dick Hopkins (1st season)
- Home stadium: Finley Stadium

2008 Southern Conference football standings
	Conf.			Overall
Team	W		L	W		L
No. 5 Appalachian State $^	8	–	0	11	–	3
No. 9 Wofford ^	7	–	1	9	–	3
No. 17 Elon	6	–	2	8	–	4
Furman	4	–	4	7	–	5
Samford	4	–	4	6	–	5
Georgia Southern	4	–	4	6	–	5
The Citadel	2	–	6	4	–	8
Western Carolina	1	–	7	3	–	9
Chattanooga	0	–	8	1	–	11
$ – Conference champion; ^ – FCS playoff participant; Rankings from The Sports Network FCS Poll

The 2008 Chattanooga Mocs football team represented the University of Tennessee at Chattanooga as a member of the Southern Conference (SoCon)in the 2008 NCAA Division I FCS football season. The Mocs were led by sixth-year head coach Rodney Allison and played their home games at Finley Stadium. They finished the season 1–11 overall and 0–8 in SoCon play to place ninth. Allison was relieved of his coaching duties at the end of the season.

== Schedule ==
Date	Time	Opponent	Site	TV	Result	Attendance	Source
August 30	7:00 p.m.	at No. 4 (FBS) Oklahoma*	Gaylord Family Oklahoma Memorial Stadium; Norman, OK	FSN	L 2–57	84,715	
September 6	6:00 p.m.	Cumberland (TN)	Finley Stadium; Chattanooga, TN		W 47–6	6,003	
September 13	3:45 p.m.	at Florida State*	Doak Campbell Stadium; Tallahassee, FL	ESPNU	L 7–46	71,596	
September 20	6:00 p.m.	Jacksonville State^{†}	Finley Stadium; Chattanooga, TN		L 3–31	8,240	
September 27	3:30 p.m.	at No. 16 Furman	Paladin Stadium; Greenville, SC		L 10–35	9,017	
October 4	6:00 p.m.	at Georgia Southern	Finley Stadium; Chattanooga, TN		L 28–52	5,616	
October 11	3:00 p.m.	at No. 9 Wofford	Gibbs Stadium; Spartanburg, SC		L 7–56	8,394	
October 18	2:00 p.m.	No. 3 Elon	Finley Stadium; Chattanooga, TN		L 7–42	4,505	
November 1	1:00 p.m.	at Western Carolina	Whitmire Stadium; Cullowhee, NC		L 7–27	5,137	
November 8	2:00 p.m.	No. 2 Appalachian State	Finley Stadium; Chattanooga, TN		L 7–49	6,057	
November 15	2:00 p.m.	at The Citadel	Johnson Hagood Stadium; Charleston, SC		L 21–24	14,213	
November 22	2:00 p.m.	Samford	Finley Stadium; Chattanooga, TN		L 7–30	4,068	
*Non-conference game; ^{†}Homecoming; Rankings from The Sports Network Poll released prior to the game; All times are in Eastern time
