= 2001 North Dakota Fighting Sioux football team =

American college football season

2001 North Dakota Fighting Sioux football

NCAA Division II champion NCC champion

NCAA Division II Championship Game, W 17–14 vs. Grand Valley State
- Conference: North Central Conference

Ranking
- AFCA: No. 1
- Record: 14–1 (7–1 NCC)
- Head coach: Dale Lennon (3rd season)
- Offensive coordinator: Chris Mussman (3rd season)
- Offensive scheme: Multiple
- Defensive coordinator: Bubba Schweigert (5th season)
- Base defense: 3–4
- Captains: Dan Graf; Kelby Klosterman; Travis O'Neel; Eric Schmidt
- Home stadium: Alerus Center

2001 North Central Conference football standings
	Conf.			Overall
Team	W		L	W		L
No. 4 North Dakota $^	7	–	1	14	–	1
No. 15 Nebraska–Omaha ^	6	–	2	8	–	3
No. 22 North Dakota State	5	–	3	7	–	3
Northern Colorado	4	–	4	7	–	4
South Dakota State	4	–	4	5	–	6
Augustana (SD)	3	–	5	5	–	5
Minnesota State	3	–	5	4	–	7
St. Cloud State	3	–	5	4	–	7
South Dakota	1	–	7	2	–	8
$ – Conference champion; ^ – NCAA Division II playoff participant; Rankings from AFCA Poll

The 2001 North Dakota Fighting Sioux football team represented University of North Dakota in the 2001 NCAA Division II football season. The Fighting Sioux won the NCAA Division II national championship, the team's first. Their head coach was Dale Lennon, a former fullback for the school. The team's quarterback was junior Kelby Klosterman, who threw 32 touchdowns and 7 interceptions. The leading rusher was Jed Perkerewicz, who rushed for almost 800 yards and 7 touchdowns. Three receivers had at least eight touchdowns; Dan Graf had ten, Jesse Smith had nine, and Luke Schleusner had eight. Mac Schneider, an American attorney who now serves as United States Attorney for the District of North Dakota, started three games in a backup role as offensive lineman for the team and served as team captain his senior year. The defense had a plus nineteen turnover margin and allowed fewer than thirteen points a game and just three rushing touchdowns all season. Eric Schmidt led the defense with ten sacks.

== Schedule ==
North Dakota got off to a 6–0 start, before playing on October 24 to face the 6–0 UNO Mavericks of the University of Nebraska at Omaha. The game was tied at the end of regulation, with UNO winning in overtime, 27–24, by the margin of a field goal. The Omaha team lost 2 of its last 3 games, while the Sioux won all three of theirs, for the NCC title.

Date	Opponent	Rank	Site	Result	Attendance	Source
August 30	at Central Washington*	No. 14	Tomlinson Stadium; Ellensburg, WA	W 17–14	1,250	
September 8	Minnesota–Crookston*	No. 12	Alerus Center; Grand Forks, ND	W 57–6		
September 15	Northern Colorado	No. 11	Alerus Center; Grand Forks, ND	W 13–7	9,265	
September 21	New Haven*	No. 11	Alerus Center; Grand Forks, ND	W 42–10	8,850	
September 29	South Dakota State	No. 11	Alerus Center; Grand Forks, ND	W 44–9	9,182	
October 6	No. 2 North Dakota State	No. 11	Alerus Center; Grand Forks, ND (Nickel Trophy)	W 19–7	13,500	
October 13	at St. Cloud State	No. 3	Selke Field; St. Cloud, MN	W 35–28	3,133	
October 20	No. 2 Nebraska–Omaha	No. 3	Alerus Center; Grand Forks, ND	L 24–27 ^{OT}	12,580	
October 27	at Minnesota State	No. 8	Blakeslee Stadium; Mankato, MN	W 28–14	1,741	
November 3	Augustana (SD)	No. 6	Alerus Center; Grand Forks, ND	W 37–14	9,847	
November 10	at South Dakota	No. 5	DakotaDome; Vermillion, SD (Sitting Bull Trophy)	W 48–7	3,735	
November 17	No. 13 Winona State*	No. 4	Alerus Center; Grand Forks, ND (NCAA Division II First Round)	W 42–28	6,700	
November 24	No. 6 Pittsburg State*	No. 4	Alerus Center; Grand Forks, ND (NCAA Division II Quarterfinal)	W 38–0	8,222	
December 1	No. 12 UC Davis*	No. 4	Alerus Center; Grand Forks, ND (NCAA Division II Semifinal)	W 14–2	11,696	
December 8	vs. No. 2 Grand Valley State*	No. 4	Braly Municipal Stadium; Florence, AL (NCAA Division II Championship Game)	W 17–14	6,113	
*Non-conference game; Rankings from AFCA Poll released prior to the game

== NCAA Division II playoffs ==
After finishing the season at 10–1–0 and winning the North Central Conference title, The University of North Dakota qualified for the playoffs as a home team. The first-round game brought the Winona State Warriors to Grand Forks on November 17. Kelby Klosterman threw six touchdown passes, tying the Division II playoff record. The first two TDs were made from catches by John Kyvig, and the last four were to Jesse Smith, and the Sioux won 42–28. Brian Wilhelmi also had one assisted tackle on the punt team to cap the victory.

The Pittsburg State Gorillas were the next team to visit Grand Forks, on November 24 for the quarterfinal round. Cameron Peterka broke the NCAA playoff record with a 59-yard field goal at the close of the first half. The Sioux held Pittsburg State to minus 17 (−17) yards rushing on their way to a 38–0 win.

The semifinal game on December 1 brought the UC-Davis Aggies to Grand Forks, and the Sioux had a 14–0 lead with 30 seconds left. With UND on its own 3 yard line on fourth down, Coach Dale Lennon directed Klosterman to down the ball in the end zone for a safety, giving the Californians their only points in the 14–2 game. North Dakota earned its first ever trip ever to the Division II championship game in Florence, Alabama, to face the Lakers of Michigan's Grand Valley State University.

Though UND had a 7–3 lead at the half, the Lakers took a 14–10 lead with 2:46 to play after Ryan Brady ran 12 yards for a touchdown. The Sioux had the ball on their 20-yard line as the game was winding down. Klosterman's first two passes were incomplete, and on third, he ran for yardage, but the Sioux were still 2 yards short on fourth down. Klosterman gambled and ran seven yards to keep the drive alive. Three downs later, the Sioux were at their 41-yard line, and it was fourth down again. Gambling again, Klosterman completed a pass to Luke Schleusner to get the first down, but Schleusner eluded a tackler and, with the help of a block by Jesse Smith, made it to the one yard line. With 29 seconds to play, Jed Perkerewicz took the handoff for the winning touchdown, giving the Sioux the 2001 Division II national championship.

== Roster ==
2001 North Dakota Fighting Sioux football team roster
Players
Coaches
Offense

Pos.	#	Name	Class
WR	2	Jesse Smith	Jr
WR	4	Jamel Alkins	Sr
RB	5	Adam Roland	Fr
QB	6	Shad Carney	Fr
WR	8	Caleb Johnson	Fr
QB	9	Kelby Klosterman	Jr
QB	12	John Bowenkamp	So
QB	13	Joe Wilson	So
QB	14	Evan Nelson	Fr
WR	16	Josh Ranson	Fr
RB	18	Jim Miller	So
TE	45	Chad Mustard	Sr
OL	73	Chris Kuper	Fr
WR	89	Luke Schleusner	Sr

Defense

Pos.	#	Name	Class
CB	1	Thayne Bosh	Jr
DB	3	Dustin Thornburg	Jr
DB	11	Jamaal Franklin	Fr
DB	19	Tom Maus	So
DB	20	Ryan Manke	Fr
LB	36	Travis O'Neel	Fr
FS	38	Josh Brandsted	Fr
DB	38	Mike O'Neil	Sr
LB	39	Brian Wilhelmi	So
LB	40	Digger Anderson	Fr
LB	40	Eric Schmidt	Sr
DL	42	Ross Brennan	Fr
LB	44	Tyler Dahlen	Fr
LB	48	Josh Kotelnicki	Jr

Special teams

Pos.	#	Name	Class
K	7	Jeff Glas	Fr
K	11	Cameron Peterka	Sr
P	15	Brian Loe	Fr
P	17	Bret Bentow	Jr

Head coach

- Dale Lennon

Coordinators/assistant coaches

- Chris Mussman
  Offensive coordinator/Offensive line
- Bubba Schweigert
  Defensive coordinator
- Tom Dosch
  Outside linebackers/Defensive line
- Dick Koppenhaver
  Quarterbacks

Legend

- (C) Team captain
- (S) Suspended
- (I) Ineligible
- Injured
- Redshirt

Roster
Last update: November 11, 2001
