= 1964 Valley City State Vikings football team =

American college football season

1964 Valley City State Vikings football

NDCAC co-champion
- Conference: North Dakota College Athletic Conference
- Record: 7–1 (5–1 NDCAC)
- Head coach: Dick Koppenhaver (3rd season)
- Home stadium: Hanna Field

1964 North Dakota College Athletic Conference football standings
| | Conf. | | | | | Overall |
| Team | W | | L | | T | W | | L | | T |
|---|---|---|---|---|---|---|---|---|---|---|
| Valley City State + | 5 | – | 1 | – | 0 | 7 | – | 1 | – | 0 |
| Mayville State + | 5 | – | 1 | – | 0 | 6 | – | 2 | – | 0 |
| Dickinson State | 4 | – | 2 | – | 0 | 6 | – | 2 | – | 0 |
| Minot State | 4 | – | 2 | – | 0 | 5 | – | 3 | – | 0 |
| Wahpeton Science | 2 | – | 4 | – | 0 | ? | – | ? | – | ? |
| Jamestown | 1 | – | 5 | – | 0 | 1 | – | 7 | – | 0 |
| Ellendale | 0 | – | 6 | – | 0 | ? | – | ? | – | ? |
+ – Conference co-champions

The 1964 Valley City State Vikings football team represented Valley City State College—now known as Valley City State University—as a member of the North Dakota College Athletic Conference (NDCAC) during the 1964 NAIA football season. Led by Dick Koppenhaver in his third and final season as head coach, the Vikings compiled an overall record of 7–1 with a mark of 5–1 in conference play, earning sharing the NDCAC title with Mayville State.

Valley City State posted one of the strongest defensive seasons in school history, recording multiple shutouts and allowing seven points or fewer in five games. The Vikings' only loss came in conference play, against Dickinson State. The 1964 team was inducted into the Viking Hall of Fame in 2008.

== Schedule ==
| Date | Opponent | Site | Result |
|---|---|---|---|
| September 18 | at Ellendale | Ellendale, ND | W 21–0 |
| September 26 | Mayville State | (rivaly) | W 16–0 |
| October 2 | Huron* | Valley City, ND | W 35–19 |
| October 10 | Dickinson State | Valley City, ND (rivaly) | L 6–13 |
| October 17 | at Jamestown | Jamestown, ND (rivaly) | W 21–6 |
| October | Wahpeton Science | | W 41–0 |
| October 29 | Minot State | Valley City, ND | W 7–6 |
| November 7 | at Minnesota–Morris* | Morris, MN | W 14–7 |
*Non-conference game

== Personnel ==
=== Coaching staff ===
- Dick Koppenhaver: head coach
- Don Lemnus: assistant coach
- Larry Grooters: assistant coach
- Bob Bruhschwein: assistant coach
- T. Langemo: student manager

=== Roster ===
W. Aldinger, J. Ziegler, G. Miller, R. Smedshammer, D. Felt, J. Welder, D. Aardahl, E. Ternes, J. Kroeber, B. Coghlan, V. Newton, J. Moch, D. Friestad, S. McNickle, M. Ranum, G. Hebl, J. Taylor, B. Johnson, J. Johnson, E. Miller, D. Schwartz, B. Jacobson, J. Undem, T. Stieckler, L. Hintz, D. Parrish, K. Rossum, C. Armey, R. Pommerer, W. Jantzen, B. Hansen, B. Dwyer, T. Henn, C. Young, D. Dewald, R. Frostad, R. Steidl, G. Zick, J. Englerth, A. Gilliss, H. Backhaus, L. Ukestad, P. Mueller, J. Becker, B. Kyvig, R. Burger, R. Clark, D. Colis.
