= Eric Schmidt (American football) =

American football coach (born 1978)

Current position
- Title: Head coach
- Team: North Dakota
- Conference: MVFC
- Record: 16-10

Biographical details
- Born: September 20, 1978 (age 48); Mandan, North Dakota, U.S.

Playing career
- 1998–2001: North Dakota
- Position: Linebacker

Coaching career (HC unless noted)
- 2002–2005: Crookston HS (MN)
- 2006–2007: North Dakota (LB)
- 2008–2009: Southern Illinois (OLB)
- 2010–2011: Southern Illinois (DL)
- 2012–2013: Southern Illinois (STC/ILB)
- 2014–2017: North Dakota (DC/ILB)
- 2018: North Dakota (DC/OLB)
- 2019: North Dakota (DC/DL)
- 2020–2021: Fresno State (STC/DL)
- 2022–2023: Washington (STC/DE)
- 2024: San Diego State (DC/LB)
- 2025–present: North Dakota

Head coaching record
- Overall: 16-10 (college)
- Tournaments: 1–1 (NCAA D-I Playoffs)

Eric Schmidt (born September 20, 1978) is an American football coach. He is the head football coach at the University of North Dakota, a position he had held since the 2025 season.

== Playing history ==
Schmidt played for the Fighting Sioux from 1998 to 2001 and was a captain of the Fighting Sioux's 2001 national championship team. A two-time All-North Central Conference selection, Schmidt earned All-America honors as a senior in 2001. His 10.0 sacks as a senior set a new school record.

== Coaching history ==
=== Crookston High School ===
Schmidt led the Pirates to a Section 8AAA runner-up finish in 2004, and one year earlier, led the team to the Minnesota state semifinals. Schmidt was named the 2003 Section 8AAA Coach of the Year. He also coached girls basketball at Crookston and guided the team to a State AA runner-up finish in 2006.

=== North Dakota ===
Schmidt returned to North Dakota as the linebackers coach for the 2006 and 2007 seasons. He worked under Dale Lennon during that time.

=== Southern Illinois ===
Schmidt coached six seasons at Southern Illinois. During that time he coached multiple defensive positions before serving as the special teams coordinator for his final two years.

=== North Dakota (second stint) ===
Schmidt helped lead his alma mater to two NCAA Division I FCS playoff berths during his tenure, the initial was a first for the program in 2016, the same season they claimed a Big Sky Championship with a defense that gave up just 91.3 yards rushing per game (sixth-best in the FCS) and collected 20 interceptions (second-best in the FCS). The second was in 2019, following three wins versus ranked opponents en route to a 7–4 campaign that included a 6–0 mark at home.

Schmidt had a pair of players in 2019 share All-America distinctions.

=== Fresno State ===
Schmidt was at Fresno State for two seasons serving as defensive line coach and special teams coordinator. He worked under Kalen DeBoer. The two first worked together at Southern Illinois, when DeBoer was offensive coordinator and wide receivers coach from 2010 to 2013.

In two seasons at Fresno State, Schmidt was part of a defensive staff that helped coach a unit that made vast statistical improvements in nearly every team defensive category over the 2019 season, the year before his arrival.

=== Washington ===
During his time at Washington, Schmidt was the special teams coordinator and coached the EDGE defenders. He helped lead Washington to the CFP National Championship game versus Michigan.

=== San Diego State ===
Schmidt spent one season at San Diego State where he was the defensive coordinator and linebackers coach. In his one season with the Aztecs, Schmidt coached four players to All-Mountain West honors.

=== North Dakota (third stint) ===
Schmidt was announced as the 28th head coach at North Dakota on December 8, 2024. Schmidt will be using a 4–2–5 defensive scheme at North Dakota changing a 3–4 scheme that had been used since the 1990s.

== Personal life ==
Schmidt received his bachelor's degree in secondary education from North Dakota in 2002.

== Head coaching record ==
Year	Team	Overall	Conference	Standing	Bowl/playoffs	STATS^{#}	Coaches^{°}
North Dakota Fighting Hawks (Missouri Valley Football Conference) (2025–present)
2025	North Dakota	8–6	5–3	T-3rd	L NCAA Division I Second Round	14	16
2026	North Dakota	8-4	5-3				
North Dakota:		16-10	10-6				
Total:		16-10					
