= 1963 Valley City State Vikings football team =

American college football season

1963 Valley City State Vikings football

NDCAC champion
- Conference: North Dakota College Athletic Conference
- Record: 6–1–1 (5–0–1 NDCAC)
- Head coach: Dick Koppenhaver (2nd season)
- Home stadium: Hanna Field

1963 North Dakota College Athletic Conference football standings
	Conf.					Overall
Team	W		L		T	W		L		T
Valley City State $	5	–	0	–	1	6	–	1	–	1
Mayville State	4	–	1	–	1	5	–	2	–	1
Minot State	3	–	2	–	1	4	–	3	–	1
Dickinson State	3	–	2	–	1	3	–	3	–	2
Wahpeton Science	3	–	3	–	0	3	–	5	–	0
Jamestown	1	–	5	–	0	1	–	7	–	0
Ellendale	0	–	6	–	0	0	–	7	–	0
$ – Conference champion

The 1963 Valley City State Vikings football team represented Valley City State College—now known as Valley City State University—as a member of the North Dakota College Athletic Conference (NDCAC) during the 1963 NAIA football season. Under second-year head coach Dick Koppenhaver, the Vikings compiled an overall record of 6–1–1 overall with a mark of 5–0–1 in conference play, capturing the NDCAC championship.

Valley City State opened the season with NDCAC victories over Minot State and Ellendale before battling Mayville State to a scoreless tie. A non-conference win over the Bethel Royals followed, and the Vikings then shut out Dickinson State, Wahpeton Science, and Jamestown in consecutive dominant defensive performances.

The 1963 squad is remembered as one of the best defensive teams in Valley City State history, recording five shutouts. The Vikings' only defeat came in the season finale against Moorhead State. The team was inducted into the Viking Hall of Fame in 2008.

== Schedule ==
Date	Opponent	Site	Result
September 13	at Minot State	Minot, ND	W 35–12
September	Ellendale		W 48–0
September	Mayville State	(rivaly)	T 0–0
October 5	Bethel (MN)*	Valley City, ND	W 12–7
October 12	Dickinson State	(rivaly)	W 21–0
October	Wahpeton Science		W 27–0
October	Jamestown	(rivaly)	W 45–0
November 2	Moorhead State*	Valley City, ND	L 7–26
*Non-conference game

== Personnel ==
=== Coaching staff ===
- Dick Koppenhaver: head coach
- Don Lemnus: assistant coach
- Larry Grooters: assistant coach
- Bob Bruhschwein: assistant coach

=== Roster ===
Team members recognized at the Hall of Fame induction include: J. Welder, R. Smedshammer, R. Prien, L. Christman, E. Nistrom, R. Stedl, B. Donarski, A. Kreeder, P. Podoll, L. Beatte, G. Bjerke, Bob Bruhschwein, F. Young, L. Lissala, L. Smith, C. Estes, R. Eynes, M. Glad, Don Lemnus, Larry Grooters, W. Welch, J. Johnson, C. Christianson, C. Amey, F. Henry, T. Koch, B. Harg, Al Goeff, D. Dewald, H. Schwans, M. Duberous, H. King, R. Schultz, C. Schroeder, and Coach Don Lemnus.
