= Senn Slemmons =

American sports coach, athletics administrator (1897–1968)

Biographical details
- Born: March 27, 1897; Canistota, South Dakota, U.S.
- Died: December 4, 1968 (aged 71); Oklahoma City, Oklahoma, U.S.

Coaching career (HC unless noted)

Football
- 1925–1948: Ellendale

Accomplishments and honors

Championships
- Football; 1 NDIAC (1932)

Senn Daniel Slemmons (March 27, 1897 – December 4, 1968) was an American college football coach and athletics administrator. He served as the head football coach at North Dakota State Normal and Industrial School in Ellendale, North Dakota from 1925 to 1948. Slemmons was also the athletic director at Ellendale.

In 1955, Slemmons moved to Muleshoe, Texas, where he served as manager of the chamber of commerce until 1959. Until 1960, he was operated the Tri-County Bowling Alley, and was the postmaster in Muleshoe until 1962. Slemmons died on December 4, 1968, at Presbyterian Hospital in Oklahoma City.

== Head coaching record ==
=== Football ===
Year	Team	Overall	Conference	Standing	Bowl/playoffs
Ellendale Dusties (Interstate Athletic Conference) (1925–1931)
1925	Ellendale				
1926	Ellendale				
1927	Ellendale				
1928	Ellendale		1–3	T–7th	
1929	Ellendale				
1930	Ellendale		0–5	9th	
1931	Ellendale				
Ellendale Dusties (North Dakota Intercollegiate Athletic Conference / North Dakota Intercollegiate Conference) (1932–1948)
1932	Ellendale		3–0	T–1st	
1933	Ellendale		0–4	7th	
1934	Ellendale		0–4	6th	
1935	Ellendale	0–4	0–4	7th	
1936	Ellendale	2–4–1	1–3–1	T–6th	
1937	Ellendale	1–3–2	1–2–2	6th	
1938	Ellendale	3–2–2	3–2–1	3rd	
1939	Ellendale	5–2	5–1	2nd	
1940	Ellendale	2–2–2	2–1–2	3rd	
1941	Ellendale	3–3	3–2	T–2nd	
1942	Ellendale				
1943	No team–World War II				
1944	No team–World War II				
1945	Ellendale				
1946	Ellendale	1–5–1	1–3–1	T–5th	
1947	Ellendale	5–1	4–1	T–2nd	
1948	Ellendale	3–3	3–3	5th	
Ellendale:					
Total:					
National championship Conference title Conference division title or championship game berth
