= State Normal and Industrial School =

The term State Normal and Industrial School may refer to:

- A former name of Alabama A&M University
- A former name of the University of North Carolina at Greensboro
- The North Dakota State Normal and Industrial School, a former college in Ellendale, North Dakota
- The St. Petersburg Normal and Industrial School, a former college in St. Petersburg, Florida, merged into the University of Florida in 1905
