= 2008 Southern Illinois Salukis football team =

American college football season

2008 Southern Illinois Salukis football

MVFC co-champion

NCAA Division I First Round, L 20–29 vs. New Hampshire
- Conference: Missouri Valley Football Conference

Ranking
- Sports Network: No. 11
- Record: 9–3 (7–1 MVFC)
- Head coach: Dale Lennon (1st season)
- Offensive coordinator: Phil Longo (1st season)
- Defensive coordinator: Bubba Schweigert (1st season)
- Home stadium: McAndrew Stadium

2008 Missouri Valley Football Conference standings
	Conf.			Overall
Team	W		L	W		L
No. 4 Northern Iowa +^	7	–	1	12	–	3
No. 11 Southern Illinois +^	7	–	1	9	–	3
South Dakota State	6	–	2	7	–	5
Western Illinois	4	–	4	6	–	5
North Dakota State	4	–	4	6	–	5
Missouri State	3	–	5	4	–	7
Youngstown State	3	–	5	4	–	8
Illinois State	2	–	6	3	–	8
Indiana State	0	–	8	0	–	12
+ – Conference co-champions; ^ – FCS playoff participant; Rankings from The Sports Network poll

The 2008 Southern Illinois Salukis football team represented Southern Illinois University as a member of the Missouri Valley Football Conference (MVFC) during the 2008 NCAA Division I FCS football season. They were led by first-year head coach Dale Lennon and played their home games at McAndrew Stadium in Carbondale, Illinois. The Salukis finished the season with a 9–3 record overall and a 7–1 mark in conference play, sharing the MVFC title with Northern Iowa. The team received an automatic bid to the FCS playoffs, where they lost to New Hampshire in the first round. Southern Illinois was ranked No. 11 in The Sports Network's postseason ranking of FCS teams.

== Schedule ==
Date	Time	Opponent	Rank	Site	TV	Result	Attendance	Source
September 6		Hampton*	No. 12	McAndrew Stadium; Carbondale, IL		W 37–31	10,051	
September 13	11:00 a.m.	at Northwestern*	No. 11	Ryan Field; Evanston, IL	BTN	L 7–33	19,062	
September 27	6:00 p.m.	No. 5 Northern Iowa	No. 15	McAndrew Stadium; Carbondale, IL	Mediacom	W 27–24	14,427	
October 4	1:00 p.m.	at No. 6 North Dakota State	No. 13	Fargodome; Fargo, ND	NBCND	L 27–35	18,942	
October 11		Indiana State^{†}	No. 16	McAndrew Stadium; Carbondale, IL		W 60–7	11,857	
October 18		at Youngstown State	No. 16	Stambaugh Stadium; Youngstown, OH		W 33–0	14,679	
October 25		at Missouri State	No. 14	Robert W. Plaster Stadium; Springfield, MO		W 23–17	6,485	
November 1	2:00 p.m.	North Dakota*	No. 14	McAndrew Stadium; Carbondale, IL		W 40–21	8,082	
November 8		No. 17 Western Illinois	No. 12	McAndrew Stadium; Carbondale, IL		W 24–14	7,676	
November 15		South Dakota State	No. 10	McAndrew Stadium; Carbondale, IL		W 38–35	5,829	
November 22		at Illinois State	No. 10	Hancock Stadium; Normal, IL		W 17–10 ^{OT}	6,023	
November 29	1:00 p.m.	No. 10 New Hampshire*	No. 9	McAndrew Stadium; Carbondale, IL (NCAA Division I First Round)		L 20–29	5,461	
*Non-conference game; ^{†}Homecoming; Rankings from The Sports Network Poll released prior to the game; All times are in Central time
