= 1958 Valley City State Vikings football team =

American college football season

1958 Valley City State Vikings football
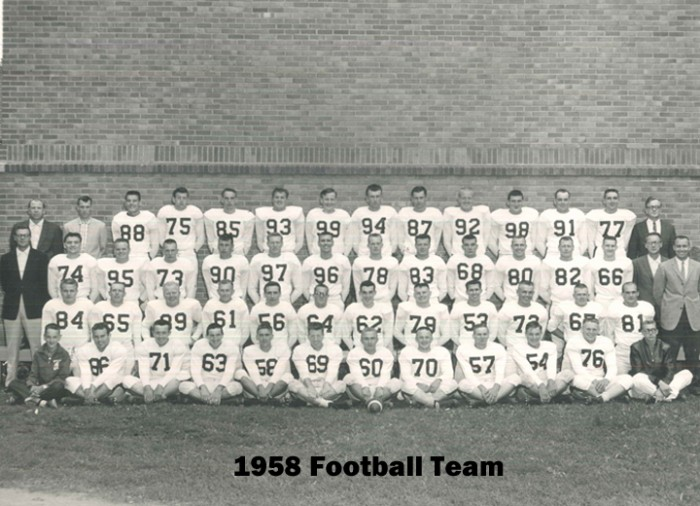

NDIC co-champion
- Conference: North Dakota Intercollegiate Conference
- Record: 6–1 (6–1 NDIC)
- Head coach: Vernon Gale (5th season)
- Home stadium: Hanna Field

1958 North Dakota Intercollegiate Conference football standings
	Conf.					Overall
Team	W		L		T	W		L		T
Valley City State +	6	–	1	–	0	6	–	1	–	0
Dickinson State +	6	–	1	–	0	6	–	1	–	0
Jamestown	5	–	2	–	0	5	–	3	–	0
Mayville State	4	–	3	–	0	4	–	3	–	0
Minot State	3	–	3	–	1	3	–	3	–	1
Wahpeton Science	2	–	5	–	0	2	–	5	–	0
Ellendale	1	–	5	–	1	1	–	5	–	1
Bismarck JC	0	–	7	–	0	0	–	7	–	0
+ – Conference co-champions

The 1958 Valley City State Teachers College Vikings football team represented Valley City State Teachers College—now known as Valley City State University—as a member of the North Dakota Intercollegiate Conference (NDIC) during the 1958 college football season. Led by fifth-year head coach Vernon Gale, the Vikings compiled an overall record of 6–1 overall record with an identical mark in conference play, sharing the NDIC title with Dickinson State.

Jim Bock and Bill Thomas were named first-team all-conference, while Jerry Halmrast, Gordon Ringdahl, Al Strand, Delton Hesse and Jack Dwyer earned honorable mention honors. Bill Thomas also finished fifth in the National Association of Intercollegiate Athletics (NAIA) in total rushing.

== Schedule ==
Date	Opponent	Site	Result
September 19	at Jamestown	Jamestown, ND (rivaly)	W 19–13
September 25	at Wahpeton Science	Wahpeton, ND	W 33–6
October 4	Minot State	Valley City, ND	W 20–13
October 9	Ellendale	Valley City, ND	W 14–13
October 16	Mayville State	Valley City, ND (rivaly)	L 6–12
	Bismarck JC		W 1–0 (forfeit win)
October 31	Dickinson State	Valley City, ND (rivaly)	W 19–7

== Personnel ==
=== Coaching staff ===
- Vernon Gale: head coach
- Arnie Flath: assistant coach
- Vince Olson: assistant coach
- Don Whitnah: assistant coach
- Frank Vetter: student coach

=== Roster ===
Team members included: J. Overbo, John Dwyer, Dan O'Conner, Bill Lewenski, Robert Carpenter, Ivan Lehman, Michael Chametzki, David Knutson, Raymond Murdock, G. Griffin, David Layton, A. Olson, Kenneth Huber, Dale Townsend, Allen Strand, Matt Burgad, James Roles, Ken Schatz, Ronald Lisey, Patrick Hand, Joe Stanczyk, J. McLean, Charles Walby, James McCord, Veron Gale, Arnold Flath, Frank Hillbom, Edward Morris, Jim Walby, Gordon Ringdahl, Jack Ramey, Marvin Relb, Robert Reynolds, Merle Halmrast, Curtis Thompson, Edroy Kringstad, Gerald Halmrast, Bill Thomas, W. E. Osmon, Vince Olson, Frank Vetter, J. Blazek, John Washlock, Dick Silles, Delton Hesse, Al Larson, Ken Gengler, John Stenhjem, James Martin, Thomas Alchele, Eugene Cederberg, James Bock, Donald Whitnah.
