= 2008 Northern Iowa Panthers football team =

American college football season

2008 Northern Iowa Panthers football

MVFC co-champion

NCAA Division I Semifinal, L 20–21 vs. Richmond
- Conference: Missouri Valley Football Conference

Ranking
- Sports Network: No. 4
- FCS Coaches: No. 4
- Record: 12–3 (7–1 MVFC)
- Head coach: Mark Farley (8th season)
- Co-offensive coordinators: Bill Salmon (8th season); Mario Verduzco (3rd season)
- Co-defensive coordinators: Scott Frost (1st season); Chris Klieman (1st season)
- Home stadium: UNI-Dome

2008 Missouri Valley Football Conference standings
	Conf.			Overall
Team	W		L	W		L
No. 4 Northern Iowa +^	7	–	1	12	–	3
No. 11 Southern Illinois +^	7	–	1	9	–	3
South Dakota State	6	–	2	7	–	5
Western Illinois	4	–	4	6	–	5
North Dakota State	4	–	4	6	–	5
Missouri State	3	–	5	4	–	7
Youngstown State	3	–	5	4	–	8
Illinois State	2	–	6	3	–	8
Indiana State	0	–	8	0	–	12
+ – Conference co-champions; ^ – FCS playoff participant; Rankings from The Sports Network poll

The 2008 Northern Iowa Panthers football team represented the University of Northern Iowa as a member of the Missouri Valley Football Conference (MVFC) during the 2008 NCAA Division I FCS football season. Led by eighth-year head coach Mark Farley, the Panthers compiled an overall record of 12–3 with a mark of 7–1 in conference play, sharing the MVFC title with South Dakota State. Northern Iowa was awarded the third seed in the NCAA Division I Football Championship playoffs, where the Panthers defeated Maine in the first round and New Hampshire in the quarterfinals before losing to the eventual national champion, Richmond, in the semifinals. The team played home games at the UNI-Dome in Cedar Falls, Iowa.

== Schedule ==
Date	Time	Opponent	Rank	Site	TV	Result	Attendance	Source
August 30	5:00 pm	at No. 16 (FBS) BYU*	No. 3	LaVell Edwards Stadium; Provo, UT	mtn	L 17–41	64,108	
September 6	4:05 pm	South Dakota*	No. 9	UNI-Dome; Cedar Falls, IA	CFU	W 24–13	12,904	
September 20	4:05 pm	No. 12 South Dakota State	No. 8	UNI-Dome; Cedar Falls, IA	CFU, Mediacom	W 34–20	15,136	
September 27	6:00 pm	at No. 15 Southern Illinois	No. 5	McAndrew Stadium; Carbondale, IL	Mediacom	L 24–27	14,427	
October 2	6:35 pm	Nicholls State*	No. 10	UNI-Dome; Cedar Falls, IA	ESPNU	W 34–14	9,028	
October 11	4:05 pm	Illinois State^{†}	No. 10	UNI-Dome; Cedar Falls, IA	CFU, Mediacom	W 31–17	16,100	
October 18	4:05 pm	No. 20 North Dakota State	No. 6	UNI-Dome; Cedar Falls, IA	KFXA, Missouri Valley FB TV	W 23–13	13,416	
October 25	3:00 pm	at Youngstown State	No. 5	Stambaugh Stadium; Youngstown, OH		W 21–20	15,937	
November 1	12:05 pm	at No. 12 Western Illinois	No. 5	Hanson Field; Macomb, IL		W 30–6	10,258	
November 8	4:05 pm	Missouri State	No. 4	UNI-Dome; Cedar Falls, IA	CFU, Mediacom	W 42–0	13,426	
November 15	11:00 am	at Indiana State	No. 4	Memorial Stadium; Terre Haute, IN		W 28–0	2,381	
November 22	2:00 pm	at Southern Utah*	No. 4	Eccles Coliseum; Cedar City, UT		W 34–24	3,145	
November 29	4:05 pm	No. 21 Maine*	No. 4	UNI-Dome; Cedar Falls, IA (NCAA Division I First Round)		W 40–15	8,477	
December 6	6:00 pm	No. 10 New Hampshire*	No. 4	UNI-Dome; Cedar Falls, IA (NCAA Division I Quarterfinal)	ESPN360	W 36–34	9,055	
December 13	3:00 pm	No. 7 Richmond*	No. 4	UNI-Dome; Cedar Falls, IA (NCAA Division I Semifinal)	ESPN	L 20–21	12,062	
*Non-conference game; ^{†}Homecoming; Rankings from The Sports Network Poll released prior to the game; All times are in Central time

== Rankings ==
Ranking movements Legend: ██ Increase in ranking ██ Decrease in ranking
	Week														
Poll	Pre	1	2	3	4	5	6	7	8	9	10	11	12	13	Final
The Sports Network	3	9	9	8	5	10	10	6	5	5	4	4	4	4	4
FCS Coaches	4	5	8	7	5	10	8	4	4	4	4	4	4	4	4

== Coaching staff ==
Name	Position	Year at Northern Iowa	Alma mater (year)
Mark Farley	Head coach	8th	Northern Iowa (1987)
Rick Nelson	Recruiting coordinator Offensive Line	9th	Northern Iowa (1984)
Bill Salmon	Associate head coach Offensive coordinator Receivers	8th	Northern Iowa (1980)
Mario Verduzco	Co-offensive coordinator Quarterbacks	8th	San José State (1988)
Atif Austin	Running backs	4th	Iowa State (2003)
Scott Frost	Co-defensive coordinator Linebackers	2nd	Nebraska (1997)
Chris Klieman	Co-defensive coordinator Secondary	3rd	Northern Iowa (1990)
Jerry Montgomery	Defensive line	3rd	Iowa (2001)
Erik Chinander	Tight ends	5th	Iowa (2003)
Bill Wilt	Defensive line	1st	Eureka College (1977)
