= 1930 Western Illinois Leathernecks football team =

American college football season

1930 Western Illinois Leathernecks football
- Conference: Illinois Intercollegiate Athletic Conference
- Record: 4–4 (3–4 IIAC)
- Head coach: Ray Hanson (5th season)

1930 Illinois Intercollegiate Athletic Conference football standings
	Conf.					Overall
Team	W		L		T	W		L		T
Southern Illinois +	5	–	0	–	0	9	–	0	–	0
Millikin +	4	–	0	–	0	5	–	2	–	0
Mount Morris +	3	–	0	–	0	9	–	0	–	0
Eastern Illinois	5	–	1	–	1	6	–	1	–	1
Northern Illinois State	4	–	1	–	1	6	–	2	–	1
Knox (IL)	4	–	1	–	0	5	–	2	–	1
Monmouth (IL)	5	–	2	–	0	5	–	4	–	0
Lake Forest	2	–	1	–	0	5	–	1	–	1
Illinois Wesleyan	4	–	2	–	0	6	–	2	–	0
Elmhurst	3	–	2	–	0	6	–	2	–	0
Augustana (IL)	3	–	2	–	0	4	–	3	–	0
North Central	2	–	2	–	1	6	–	2	–	1
Bradley	2	–	2	–	1	4	–	3	–	1
Carthage	3	–	3	–	0	3	–	4	–	1
Western Illinois	3	–	4	–	0	4	–	4	–	0
Shurtleff	2	–	3	–	0	6	–	4	–	0
St. Viator	3	–	5	–	0	3	–	6	–	0
Eureka	2	–	6	–	0	2	–	6	–	0
Illinois State Normal	1	–	7	–	0	1	–	7	–	0
Wheaton (IL)	0	–	4	–	0	2	–	6	–	0
McKendree	0	–	5	–	0	3	–	6	–	0
Illinois College	0	–	7	–	0	0	–	8	–	0
+ – Conference co-champions

The 1930 Western Illinois Leathernecks football team represented Western Illinois State Teachers College—now known as Western Illinois University—as a member of the Illinois Intercollegiate Athletic Conference (IIAC) during the 1930 college football season. Led by fifth-year head coach Ray Hanson, the Leathernecks compiled and overall record of 4–4 with a mark of 3–4 in conference play, placing 15th in the IIAC.

== Schedule ==
Date	Opponent	Site	Result
October 3	Knox (IL)	Macomb, IL	L 0–15
October 10	Eureka	Macomb, IL	W 19–6
October 18	Shurtleff^{†}	Macomb, IL	W 18–0
October 24	Augustana (IL)	Macomb, IL	L 15–20
November 1	at Illinois State	Normal, IL	W 7–3
November 14	St. Ambrose*	Macomb, IL	W 53–0
November 22	at Eastern Illinois	Charleston, IL	L 0–21
November 27	at Carthage	Carthage, IL	L 6–12
*Non-conference game; ^{†}Homecoming
