= 2008 North Dakota State Bison football team =

American college football season

2008 North Dakota State Bison football
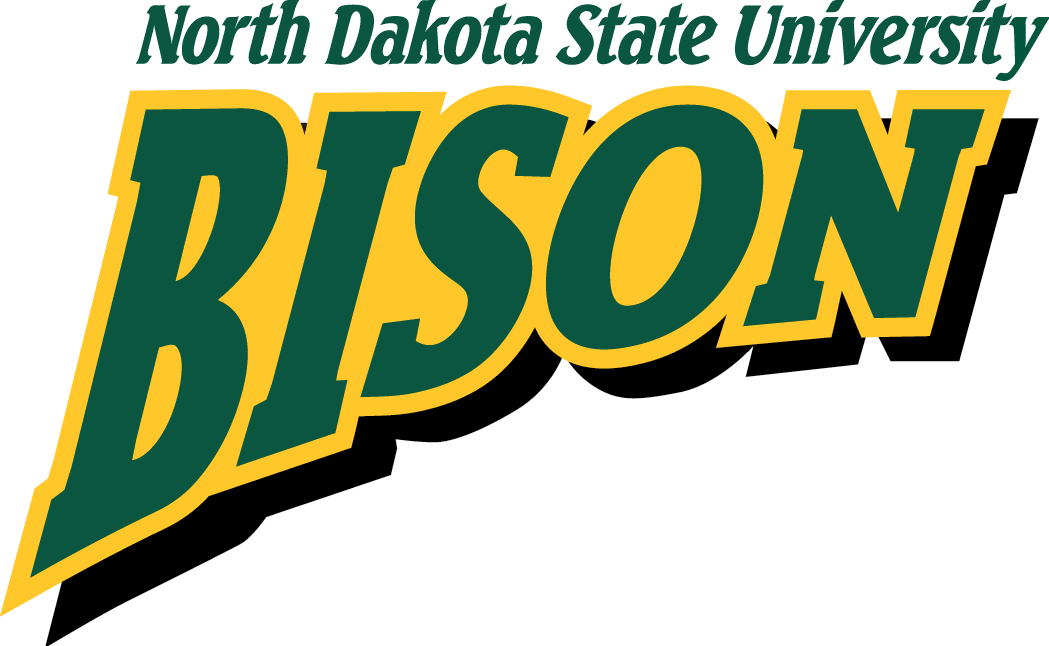
- Conference: Missouri Valley Football Conference
- Record: 6–5 (4–4 MVFC)
- Head coach: Craig Bohl (6th season)
- Offensive coordinator: Patrick Perles (4th season)
- Offensive scheme: Pro-style
- Defensive coordinator: Willie Mack Garza (4th season)
- Base defense: 4–3
- Home stadium: Fargodome

2008 Missouri Valley Football Conference standings
	Conf.			Overall
Team	W		L	W		L
No. 4 Northern Iowa +^	7	–	1	12	–	3
No. 11 Southern Illinois +^	7	–	1	9	–	3
South Dakota State	6	–	2	7	–	5
Western Illinois	4	–	4	6	–	5
North Dakota State	4	–	4	6	–	5
Missouri State	3	–	5	4	–	7
Youngstown State	3	–	5	4	–	8
Illinois State	2	–	6	3	–	8
Indiana State	0	–	8	0	–	12
+ – Conference co-champions; ^ – FCS playoff participant; Rankings from The Sports Network poll

The 2008 North Dakota State Bison football team represented North Dakota State University in the 2008 NCAA Division I FCS football season. The team was led by sixth-year head coach Craig Bohl and played their home games at the Fargodome in Fargo, North Dakota. The Bison finished with an overall record of 6–5, tying for third place in the Missouri Valley Football Conference (MVFC) with a 4–4 mark. After being ranked in the polls every week to that point, North Dakota State was bumped out of a likely playoff spot with a home loss in the season finale to South Dakota State by one point.

== Schedule ==
Date	Time	Opponent	Rank	Site	TV	Result	Attendance	Source
August 28	7:00 pm	Austin Peay*	No. 2	Fargodome; Fargo, ND		W 41–6	18,701	
September 6	6:00 pm	Central Connecticut State*	No. 1	Fargodome; Fargo, ND		W 50–14	18,868	
September 13	2:00 pm	at Wyoming*	No. 1	War Memorial Stadium; Laramie, WY		L 13–16	19,156	
September 20	5:00 pm	at Youngstown State	No. 2	Stambaugh Stadium; Youngstown, OH	KXJB-TV	L 24–32	14,331	
October 4	1:00 pm	No. 13 Southern Illinois^{†}	No. 6	Fargodome; Fargo, ND	NBCND	W 35–27	18,942	
October 11	6:00 pm	No. 17 Western Illinois	No. 6	Fargodome; Fargo, ND (Trees Bowl)	NBCND	L 22–27	17,043	
October 18	4:05 pm	at No. 6 Northern Iowa	No. 16	UNI-Dome; Cedar Falls, IA	FCS/NBCND	L 13–23	13,416	
October 25	1:30 pm	at Illinois State	No. 25	Hancock Stadium; Normal, IL		W 25–7	8,004	
November 1	6:00 pm	Indiana State	No. T–24	Fargodome; Fargo, ND (Harvest Bowl)		W 34–7	16,211	
November 15	1:00 pm	at Missouri State	No. 25	Plaster Sports Complex; Springfield, MO		W 48–27	3,920	
November 22	6:00 pm	South Dakota State	No. 24	Fargodome; Fargo, ND (Dakota Marker)	NBCND	L 24–25	18,428	
*Non-conference game; ^{†}Homecoming; Rankings from The Sports Network Poll released prior to the game; All times are in Central time
