= Zeeland Hall =

- U.S. National Register of Historic Places
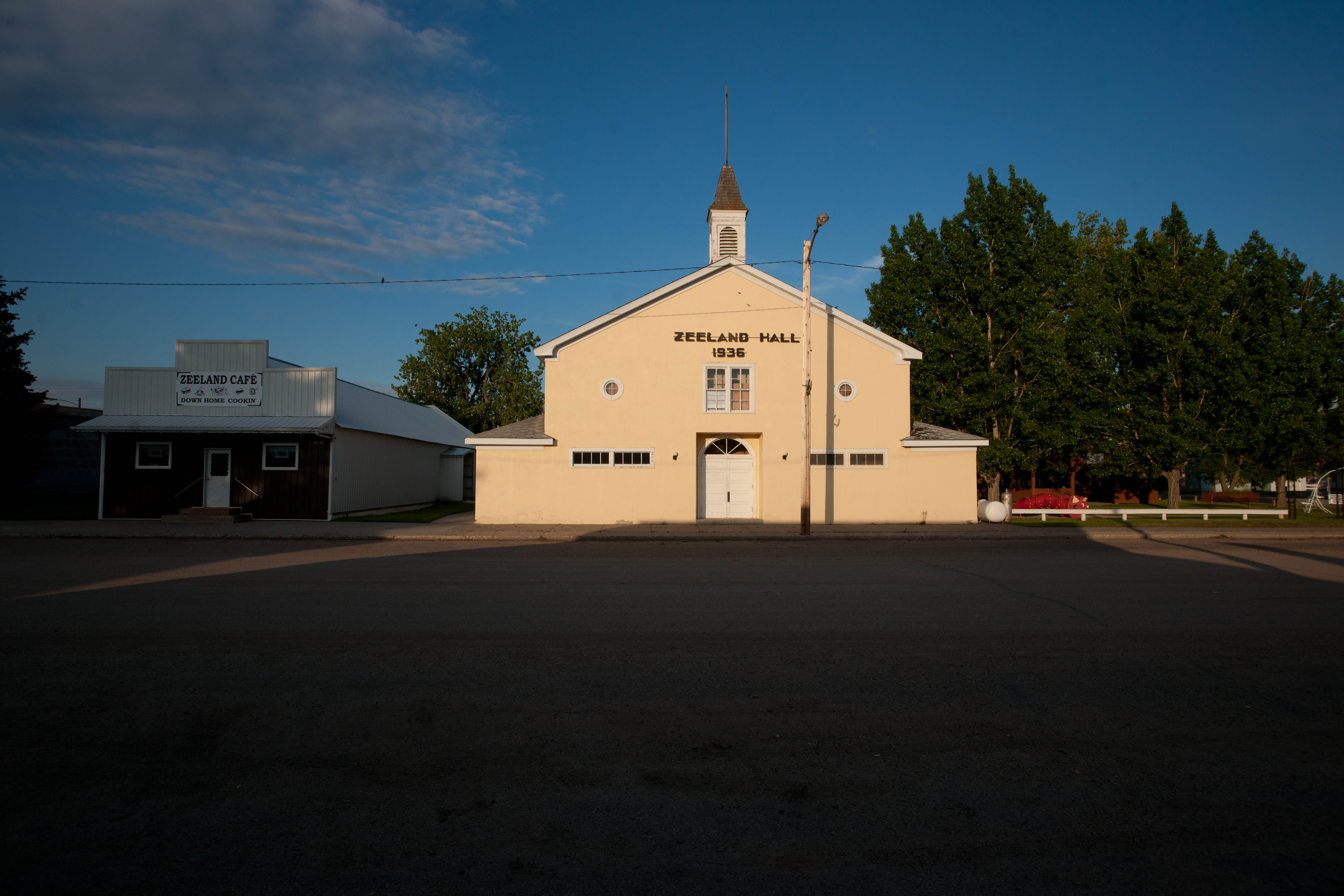

- Location within North Dakota Location within the United States
- Location: 211 S. Main Ave., Zeeland, North Dakota
- Coordinates: 45°58′19″N 99°49′49″W
- Architectural style: Colonial Revival
- MPS: Federal Relief Construction in North Dakota, 1931-1943
- NRHP reference No.: 16000368
- Added to NRHP: June 14, 2016

Zeeland Hall, on South Main Street in Zeeland, North Dakota, was built in 1936 as a Works Progress Administration project. It was listed on the National Register of Historic Places in 2016.

It is a one-story Colonial Revival-style building. It has a long central portion and one-story extensions to each side, and is approximately 58 by 98 feet (18 m × 30 m) in plan.

The Colonial Revival style is relatively unusual for New Deal public works projects; Moderne is more common.
