= 2008 Western Illinois Leathernecks football team =

American college football season

2008 Western Illinois Leathernecks football
- Conference: Missouri Valley Football Conference
- Record: 6–5 (4–4 MVFC)
- Head coach: Mark Hendrickson (acting, first 7 games); Don Patterson (10th season, final 4 games)
- Defensive coordinator: Thomas Casey (4th season)
- Home stadium: Hanson Field

2008 Missouri Valley Football Conference standings
	Conf.			Overall
Team	W		L	W		L
No. 4 Northern Iowa +^	7	–	1	12	–	3
No. 11 Southern Illinois +^	7	–	1	9	–	3
South Dakota State	6	–	2	7	–	5
Western Illinois	4	–	4	6	–	5
North Dakota State	4	–	4	6	–	5
Missouri State	3	–	5	4	–	7
Youngstown State	3	–	5	4	–	8
Illinois State	2	–	6	3	–	8
Indiana State	0	–	8	0	–	12
+ – Conference co-champions; ^ – FCS playoff participant; Rankings from The Sports Network poll

The 2008 Western Illinois Leathernecks football team represented Western Illinois University as a member of the Missouri Valley Football Conference (MVFC) in the 2008 NCAA Division I FCS football season. They were led by tenth-year head coach Don Patterson and acting head coach Mark Hendrickson, who coached the team in its first seven games while Patterson underwent cancer treatment. The team played their home games at Hanson Field in Macomb, Illinois. The Leathernecks finished the season with a 6–5 record overall and a 4–4 record in conference play, tying for fourth place in the MVFC.

== Schedule ==
Date	Time	Opponent	Rank	Site	TV	Result	Attendance	Source
August 30	6:00 p.m.	at Arkansas*	No. 25	Donald W. Reynolds Razorback Stadium; Fayetteville, AR		L 24–28	70,537	
September 6		Quincy*	No. 18	Hanson Field; Macomb, IL		W 63–0	12,328	
September 13		at No. 13 South Dakota State	No. 15	Coughlin–Alumni Stadium; Brookings, SD		L 22–24	14,382	
September 20	6:05 p.m.	Stephen F. Austin*	No. 20	Hanson Field; Macomb, IL		W 34–14	14,319	
October 4		at Missouri State	No. 21	Plaster Sports Complex; Springfield, MO		W 31–36	13,020	
October 11	6:00 p.m.	at No. 11 North Dakota State	No. 17	Fargodome; Fargo, ND	NBCND	W 27–22	17,043	
October 18		Indiana State	No. 15	Hanson Field; Macomb, IL		W 56–0	14,561	
November 1	12:05 p.m.	No. 5 Northern Iowa	No. 12	Hanson Field; Macomb, IL		L 6–30	10,258	
November 8		at No. 12 Southern Illinois	No. 17	McAndrew Stadium; Carbondale, IL		L 14–24	7,676	
November 15		Illinois State	No. 25	Hanson Field; Macomb, IL		W 48–45 ^{OT}	4,991	
November 22		Youngstown State	No. 23	Hanson Field; Macomb, IL		L 28–31	1,286	
*Non-conference game; Rankings from The Sports Network Poll released prior to the game; All times are in Central time
