= 2008 Illinois State Redbirds football team =

American college football season

2008 Illinois State Redbirds football
- Conference: Missouri Valley Football Conference
- Record: 3–8 (2–6 MVFC)
- Head coach: Denver Johnson (9th season)
- Defensive coordinator: David Ross (1st season)
- MVPs: Walter Mendenhall; Tom Nelson
- Captain: Game captains
- Home stadium: Hancock Stadium

2008 Missouri Valley Football Conference standings
	Conf.			Overall
Team	W		L	W		L
No. 4 Northern Iowa +^	7	–	1	12	–	3
No. 11 Southern Illinois +^	7	–	1	9	–	3
South Dakota State	6	–	2	7	–	5
Western Illinois	4	–	4	6	–	5
North Dakota State	4	–	4	6	–	5
Missouri State	3	–	5	4	–	7
Youngstown State	3	–	5	4	–	8
Illinois State	2	–	6	3	–	8
Indiana State	0	–	8	0	–	12
+ – Conference co-champions; ^ – FCS playoff participant; Rankings from The Sports Network poll

The 2008 Illinois State Redbirds football team represented Illinois State University as a member of the Missouri Valley Football Conference (MVFC) during the 2008 NCAA Division I FCS football season. Led by Denver Johnson in his ninth and final season as head coach, the Redbirds compiled an overall record of 3–8 with a mark of 2–6 in conference play, placing eighth in the MVFC. Illinois State played home games at Hancock Stadium in Normal, Illinois.

After the team's final game, a loss to Southern Illinois, Johnson resigned from the head coaching position.

== Schedule ==
Date	Time	Opponent	Site	TV	Result	Attendance	Source
August 30	3:30 p.m.	at Marshall*	Joan C. Edwards Stadium; Huntington, WV	ESPN+	L 10–35	25,661	
September 13		at Murray State*	Roy Stewart Stadium; Murray, KY		W 42–23	5,225	
September 20		No. 22 Eastern Illinois*	Hancock Stadium; Normal, IL (rivalry)		L 21–25	14,023	
October 4		at Indiana State	Memorial Stadium; Terre Haute, IN		W 57–6	3,971	
October 11	4:05 p.m.	at No. 8 Northern Iowa	UNI-Dome; Cedar Falls, IA	CFU/Mediacom	L 17–31	16,100	
October 18		Missouri State^{†}	Hancock Stadium; Normal, IL		L 28–34	13,292	
October 25	1:30 p.m.	No. 25 North Dakota State	Hancock Stadium; Normal, IL		L 7–25	8,004	
November 1		Youngstown State	Hancock Stadium; Normal, IL		W 54–44	11,615	
November 8		at South Dakota State	Coughlin–Alumni Stadium; Brookings, SD		L 21–52	3,276	
November 15		at No. 25 Western Illinois	Hanson Field; Macomb, IL		L 45–48 ^{OT}	4,991	
November 22		No. 10 Southern Illinois	Hancock Stadium; Normal, IL		L 10–17 ^{OT}	6,023	
*Non-conference game; ^{†}Homecoming; Rankings from The Sports Network Poll released prior to the game; All times are in Central time
