= 1930 Eureka Red Devils football team =

American college football season

1930 Eureka Red Devils football
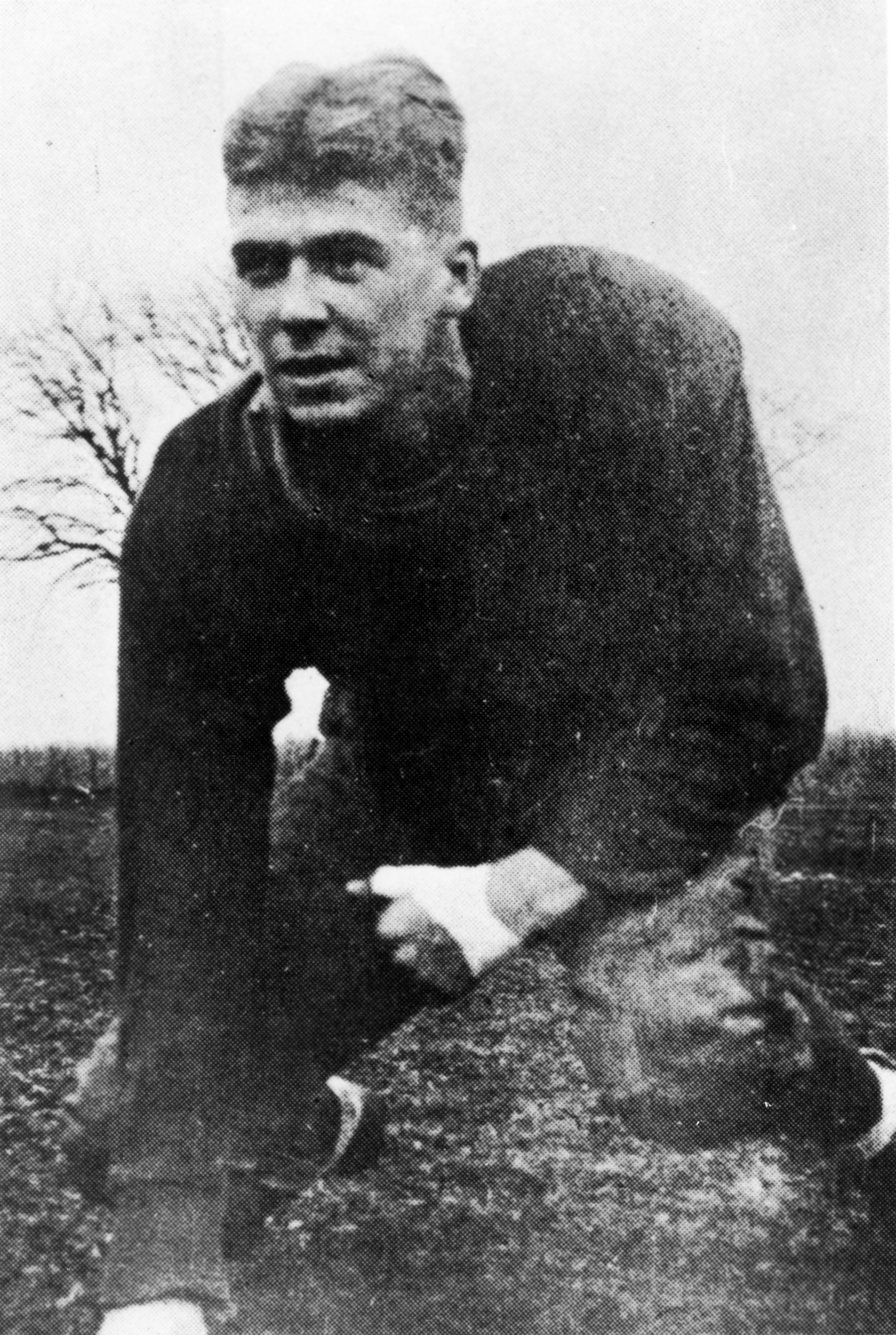
- Ronald Reagan in his Eureka College football uniform
- Conference: Illinois Intercollegiate Athletic Conference
- Record: 2–6 (2–6 IIAC)
- Head coach: Ralph McKinzie (10th season)

1930 Illinois Intercollegiate Athletic Conference football standings
	Conf.					Overall
Team	W		L		T	W		L		T
Southern Illinois +	5	–	0	–	0	9	–	0	–	0
Millikin +	4	–	0	–	0	5	–	2	–	0
Mount Morris +	3	–	0	–	0	9	–	0	–	0
Eastern Illinois	5	–	1	–	1	6	–	1	–	1
Northern Illinois State	4	–	1	–	1	6	–	2	–	1
Knox (IL)	4	–	1	–	0	5	–	2	–	1
Monmouth (IL)	5	–	2	–	0	5	–	4	–	0
Lake Forest	2	–	1	–	0	5	–	1	–	1
Illinois Wesleyan	4	–	2	–	0	6	–	2	–	0
Elmhurst	3	–	2	–	0	6	–	2	–	0
Augustana (IL)	3	–	2	–	0	4	–	3	–	0
North Central	2	–	2	–	1	6	–	2	–	1
Bradley	2	–	2	–	1	4	–	3	–	1
Carthage	3	–	3	–	0	3	–	4	–	1
Western Illinois	3	–	4	–	0	4	–	4	–	0
Shurtleff	2	–	3	–	0	6	–	4	–	0
St. Viator	3	–	5	–	0	3	–	6	–	0
Eureka	2	–	6	–	0	2	–	6	–	0
Illinois State Normal	1	–	7	–	0	1	–	7	–	0
Wheaton (IL)	0	–	4	–	0	2	–	6	–	0
McKendree	0	–	5	–	0	3	–	6	–	0
Illinois College	0	–	7	–	0	0	–	8	–	0
+ – Conference co-champions

The 1930 Eureka Red Devis football team was an American football team that represented Eureka College in the Illinois Intercollegiate Athletic Conference (IIAC) during the 1930 college football season. In its 10th season under head coach Ralph McKinzie, the team compiled a 2–6 record. Ronald Reagan, who later served as the 40th President of the United States, was a lineman on the team.

== Schedule ==
Date	Opponent	Site	Result	Source
October 3	at Bradley	Peoria, IL	L 6–27	
October 10	at Western Illinois	Macomb, IL	L 6–19	
October 18	Elmhurst	Eureka, IL	L 0–14	
October 25	Illinois State^{†}	Eureka, IL	W 12–6	
November 1	at Illinois Wesleyan	Bloomington, IL	L 0–18	
November 8	Carthage	Eureka Field; Eureka, IL	L 6–10	
November 15	at Mount Morris	Mount Morris, IL	L 0–21	
November 22	Illinois College	Eureka, IL	W 21–13	
^{†}Homecoming
