= Southern Illinois Salukis football =

Football program representing Southern Illinois University Carbondale

2026 Southern Illinois Salukis football team
- First season: 1913; 113 years ago
- Head coach: Nick Hill; 10th season, 55–61 (.474)
- Location: Carbondale, Illinois
- Stadium: Saluki Stadium (capacity: 15,000)
- NCAA division: Division I FCS
- Conference: Missouri Valley
- Colors: Maroon and white
- All-time record: 494–566–32 (.467)
- Bowl record: 2–0 (1.000)

NCAA Division I FCS championships
- 1983

Conference championships
- IIAC: 1930, 1947, 1960, 1961 Gateway: 2003, 2004, 2005 MVFC: 2008, 2009
- Rivalries: Northern Iowa
- Website: SIU Salukis Football

The Southern Illinois Salukis football program represents Southern Illinois University Carbondale in college football. The Salukis are a member of the NCAA and compete at the Division I Football Championship Subdivision level (formerly known as NCAA Division I-AA). The Salukis are a member of the Missouri Valley Football Conference and play in Saluki Stadium on the campus of Southern Illinois University Carbondale in Carbondale, Illinois, which has a seating capacity of 15,000.

The Salukis are coached by Nick Hill, who was the starting quarterback for the Salukis in 2006 and 2007.

== History ==
The first official season of Southern Illinois football took place in 1913. Their first game was a win against Anna High School.

In 1983, the Salukis began the year ranked 8th in the NCAA Division I-AA rankings. They finished the regular season ranked No. 1 with a record of 10–1. In their three playoff games, they outscored their opponents by an average of 23 points. They defeated Western Carolina 43–7 in the National Championship Game to finish the year with a record of 13–1 and to be crowned national champions.

In 2006, the Salukis defeated Indiana University in Bloomington, Indiana, 35–28, becoming the first Missouri Valley Football Conference (MVFC) school to win against a Big Ten Conference member. In 2007, the Salukis were victorious against Northern Illinois University. This marked the second consecutive year that SIU had beaten an FBS program.

In the 2000s, SIU set then-MVFC records with 99 consecutive weeks ranked in the top-25 and 14-straight MVFC wins.

== Conference affiliations ==
- Independent (1913–1924, 1962–1976)
- Interstate Intercollegiate Athletic Conference (1925–1961)
- Missouri Valley Conference (1977–1984)
- Missouri Valley Football Conference (1985–present) (known as the Gateway Football Conference until June 2008)

== Postseason games ==
The Salukis have appeared in two bowl games, compiling a 2–0 record.

=== Bowl games ===
Season	Bowl	Opponent	Result
1947	Corn Bowl	North Central	W 21–0
1949	Shrine Bowl	Indiana State	W 21–0

=== Division I-AA/FCS playoffs ===
The Salukis have appeared in 17 playoff games in I-AA/FCS tournaments, compiling a record of 11–10. They won the I-AA national championship in 1983.

Year	Round	Opponent	Result
1983	Quarterfinals	Indiana State	W 23–7
1983	Semifinals	Nevada	W 23–7
1983	National Championship Game	Western Carolina	W 43–7
2003	First Round	Delaware	L 7–48
2004	First Round	Eastern Washington	L 31–35
2005	First Round	Eastern Illinois	W 21–6
2005	Quarterfinals	Appalachian State	L 24–38
2006	First Round	UT Martin	W 36–30
2006	Quarterfinals	Montana	L 3–20
2007	First Round	Eastern Illinois	W 30–11
2007	Quarterfinals	UMass	W 34–27
2007	Semifinals	Delaware	L 17–20
2008	First Round	New Hampshire	L 20–29
2009	First Round	Eastern Illinois	W 48–7
2009	Quarterfinals	William & Mary	L 3–24
2020	First Round	Weber State	W 34–31
2020	Quarterfinals	#1 South Dakota State	L 26–31
2021	First Round	South Dakota	W 22–10
2021	Second Round	#2 North Dakota State	L 7–38
2023	First Round	Nicholls	W 35–0
2023	Second Round	#4 Idaho	L 17–20 ^{OT}

== Championships ==
=== Conference championships ===
Southern Illinois has won nine conference championships, five outright.

Years	Conference	Coach	Overall record	Conference record
1930†	Illinois Intercollegiate Athletic Conference	William McAndrew	9–0	5–0
1947	Illinois Intercollegiate Athletic Conference	Abe Martin	7–2–1	3–0–1
1960	Illinois Intercollegiate Athletic Conference	Carmen Piccone	8–2	6–0
1961	Illinois Intercollegiate Athletic Conference	Carmen Piccone	7–3	5–1
2003†	Gateway Football Conference	Jerry Kill	10–2	6–1
2004	Gateway Football Conference	Jerry Kill	10–2	7–0
2005†	Gateway Football Conference	Jerry Kill	9–4	5–2
2008†	Missouri Valley Football Conference	Dale Lennon	9–3	7–1
2009	Missouri Valley Football Conference	Dale Lennon	11–2	8–0

† denotes co-champion

=== National championships ===
Year	Coach	Selectors	Record	Bowl
1983	Rey Dempsey	NCAA Division I-AA Playoffs	13–1	Won NCAA Division I-AA National Championship Game (43–7 over Western Carolina)

== Players ==
=== Salukis in the NFL ===
SIU has had 28 players drafted in the NFL draft, including four since 2010. In total, 36 Saluki football players have gone on to play in the NFL. Some notable Salukis in the NFL are listed below.

- Kenneth Boatright – Dallas Cowboys, DE (2013–2015)
- Brandon Jacobs – New York Giants, RB (2005–2013)
- Bart Scott – Baltimore Ravens & New York Jets, LB (2002–2012)
- Carl Mauck – San Diego Chargers, OL (1969–1981, coach 1982–2007)
- Damon Jones – Jacksonville Jaguars, TE (1997–2001)
- Deji Karim – Houston Texans, RB (2010–2014)
- Houston Antwine – New England Patriots, DT (1961–1972)
- Jayson DiManche – Cincinnati Bengals, LB (2013–2017)
- Jewel Hampton – San Francisco 49ers, RB (2012–2016)
- Jim Hart – St. Louis Cardinals, QB (1966–1984)
- Kevin House – Tampa Bay Buccaneers, WR (1980–1987)
- MyCole Pruitt – Tennessee Titans, TE (2015–2024)
- Sebron Spivey – Dallas Cowboys, WR (1987)
- Amos Bullocks – Dallas Cowboys, RB (1962–1964)
- Ray Agnew III – Cleveland Browns, FB (2014–2015)
- Terry Taylor – Seattle Seahawks, DB (1984–1995)
- Tom Baugh – Kansas City Chiefs, OL (1986–1989)
- Yonel Jourdain – Buffalo Bills, KR, RB (1994–1997)
- Korey Lindsey – Indianapolis Colts & Dallas Cowboys, CB (2012, 2014)
- Chase Allen – Miami Dolphins, LB (2017–2019)
- Jeremy Chinn – Carolina Panthers, LB/SF (2019–present)
- Craig James – Philadelphia Eagles, CB (2018–2023)
- Ryan Neal – Seattle Seahawks, CB/SF (2018–2024)
- Madre Harper – New York Giants, CB (2020–2023)
- P. J. Jules — Cincinnati Bengals, SF (2024–present)

=== All-Americans ===
Cornell Craig is the school's all-time leading receiver and first receiver in school history to earn consensus All-American honors (1999). His senior season he led the nation in receiving with 77 receptions for 1,419 yards and 15 touchdowns. He also amassed over 2,000 all-purpose yards as a senior. His career numbers (all Saluki records) are 207 receptions, 3,508 yards, and 37 touchdowns. He was inducted into the SIU Athletic Hall of Fame in 2008 and is also honored on Missouri Valley Conference's 25th anniversary team along with three other Salukis.

== Assistant coaches who became head coaches ==
- Don Cross assistant OL 1960–1965 under HC Carmen Piccone & Don Shroyer Missouri State HC
- Bob Ledbetter assistant 1968–1971 under HC Dick Towers Norfolk State HC
- Jim Caldwell assistant WR 1978–1980 under Rey Dempsey HC Wake Forest, Indianapolis Colts, Detroit Lions
- Alex Wood assistant DB 1981 under Rey Dempsey HC James Madison, Buffalo,Florida A&M
- Shawn Watson assistant GA 1982 under Rey Dempsey HC Southern Illinois, Wofford
- Jan Quarless assistant 1976–1982 DL/OL/OC under Rey Dempsey HC Southern Illinois
- Charlie Strong assistant WR 1986–1987 under Ray Dorr HC Florida, Louisville, Texas, South Florida
- Jeff McInerney assistant LB 1988 under Rick Rhoades HC Centeal Connecticut State
- Bill Callahan assistant OC 1989 under Bob Smith HC Oakland Raiders, Nebraska, Washington Redskins
- Kirby Wilson assistant LB 1991 DC 1992 under Bob Smith HC Pittsburgh Maulers
- David Elson assistant GA 1994–1995 under Shawn Watson HC Western Kentucky
- Dan Enos assistant QB/WR 1997–1998 under Jan Quarless HC Central Michigan
- Tracy Claeys assistant DC 2001–2007 under Jerry Kill HC Minnesota
- Tom Matukewicz assistant LB 2001–2007 under Jerry Kill HC Southeast Missouri State
- Jay Sawvel assistant DB/ST 2001–2007 under Jerry Kill HC Wyoming
- Kyle Schweigert assistant DC 2008–2013 under Dale Lennon HC North Dakota
- Kenni Burns Assistant TE 2008–2009 under Dale Lennon HC Kent State
- Kalen DeBoer assistant OC/WR 2010–2013 under Dale Lennon HC Fresno State, Washington, Alabama
- Nick Hill assistant QB/OC 2014–2015 under Dale Lennon HC Southern Illinois
- Eric Schmidt assistant DL/LB/ST 2008–2013 under Dale Lennon HC North Dakota
- Phil Longo assistant OC 2008–2009 under Dale Lennon HC Sam Houston State

== Home venue ==
SIU Football plays at the 15,000-seat Saluki Stadium, which replaced McAndrew Stadium, the home of Saluki Football since 1938. Saluki Stadium opened on September 2, 2010, when a sellout crowd of 15,200 watched the Salukis defeat Quincy 70–7.

The Saluki Stadium is part of the university's larger athletic facilities plan, known as "Saluki Way," a comprehensive plan to renovate and restructure the campus athletic facilities.

== Future non-conference opponents ==
Announced schedules as of August 20, 2026.

2026	2027	2028	2029	2030
at West Florida	at Western Kentucky	at Chattanooga	Chattanooga	at Illinois
at Samford	West Florida	Southeast Missouri State	Samford	
Southeast Missouri State	at Wisconsin			
at Illinois	at Southeast Missouri State			

== See also ==
- Southern Illinois Salukis
