= 1930 Southern Illinois Maroons football team =

American college football season

1930 Southern Illinois Maroons football

IIAC co-champion
- Conference: Illinois Intercollegiate Athletic Conference
- Record: 9–0 (5–0 IIAC)
- Head coach: William McAndrew (14th season)

1930 Illinois Intercollegiate Athletic Conference football standings
	Conf.					Overall
Team	W		L		T	W		L		T
Southern Illinois +	5	–	0	–	0	9	–	0	–	0
Millikin +	4	–	0	–	0	5	–	2	–	0
Mount Morris +	3	–	0	–	0	9	–	0	–	0
Eastern Illinois	5	–	1	–	1	6	–	1	–	1
Northern Illinois State	4	–	1	–	1	6	–	2	–	1
Knox (IL)	4	–	1	–	0	5	–	2	–	1
Monmouth (IL)	5	–	2	–	0	5	–	4	–	0
Lake Forest	2	–	1	–	0	5	–	1	–	1
Illinois Wesleyan	4	–	2	–	0	6	–	2	–	0
Elmhurst	3	–	2	–	0	6	–	2	–	0
Augustana (IL)	3	–	2	–	0	4	–	3	–	0
North Central	2	–	2	–	1	6	–	2	–	1
Bradley	2	–	2	–	1	4	–	3	–	1
Carthage	3	–	3	–	0	3	–	4	–	1
Western Illinois	3	–	4	–	0	4	–	4	–	0
Shurtleff	2	–	3	–	0	6	–	4	–	0
St. Viator	3	–	5	–	0	3	–	6	–	0
Eureka	2	–	6	–	0	2	–	6	–	0
Illinois State Normal	1	–	7	–	0	1	–	7	–	0
Wheaton (IL)	0	–	4	–	0	2	–	6	–	0
McKendree	0	–	5	–	0	3	–	6	–	0
Illinois College	0	–	7	–	0	0	–	8	–	0
+ – Conference co-champions

The 1930 Southern Illinois Maroons football team was an American football team that represented Southern Illinois Normal University (now known as Southern Illinois University Carbondale) in the Illinois Intercollegiate Athletic Conference (IIAC), also called the Little 19, during the 1930 college football season. In its 14th season under head coach William McAndrew, the team compiled a 9–0 record (5–0 in conference games), shut out six of nine opponents, outscored all opponents by a total of 224 to 24, and won shared of the Little 19 championship.

The team played its home games at Carbondale, Illinois.

== Schedule ==
Date	Opponent	Site	Result	Source
September 26	Murray State*	Carbondale, IL	W 25–6	
October 3	at Cape Girardeau*	Houck Stadium; Cape Girardeau, MO	W 12–6	
October 10	Scott Field*	Carbondale, IL	W 39–0	
October 18	Illinois State Normal	Carbondale, IL	W 39–0	
October 24	St. Viator	Carbondale, IL	W 12–0	
October 31	Cape Girardeau*	Carbondale, IL	W 19–0	
November 7	at Shurtleff	Alton, IL	W 32–0	
November 14	Eastern Illinois	Carbondale, IL	W 2–0	
November 22	McKendree	Carbondale, IL	W 44–12	
*Non-conference game
