= 2008 Missouri State Bears football team =

American college football season

2008 Missouri State Bears football
- Conference: Missouri Valley Football Conference
- Record: 4–7 (3–5 MVFC)
- Head coach: Terry Allen (3rd season)
- Offensive coordinator: Rob Christophel (3rd season)
- Defensive coordinator: D. J. Vokolek (3rd season)
- Captains: Chris Bremher; Jeremy Dawson; Cody Kirby; Roger Wright
- Home stadium: Plaster Sports Complex

2008 Missouri Valley Football Conference standings
	Conf.			Overall
Team	W		L	W		L
No. 4 Northern Iowa +^	7	–	1	12	–	3
No. 11 Southern Illinois +^	7	–	1	9	–	3
South Dakota State	6	–	2	7	–	5
Western Illinois	4	–	4	6	–	5
North Dakota State	4	–	4	6	–	5
Missouri State	3	–	5	4	–	7
Youngstown State	3	–	5	4	–	8
Illinois State	2	–	6	3	–	8
Indiana State	0	–	8	0	–	12
+ – Conference co-champions; ^ – FCS playoff participant; Rankings from The Sports Network poll

The 2008 Missouri State Bears football team represented Missouri State University as a member of the Missouri Valley Football Conference (MVFC) during the 2008 NCAA Division I FCS football season. Led by third-year head coach Terry Allen, the Bears compiled an overall record of 4–7, with a mark of 3–5 in conference play, and finished tied for sixth in the MVFC.

== Schedule ==
Date	Time	Opponent	Site	TV	Result	Attendance	Source
September 4		Washburn*	Plaster Sports Complex; Springfield, MO		L 27–35	10,360	
September 13	12:05 p.m.	at Oklahoma State*	Boone Pickens Stadium; Stillwater, OK	FCS	L 13–57	43,388	
September 20		at Southeast Missouri State*	Houck Stadium; Cape Girardeau, MO		W 45–28		
October 4		No. 21 Western Illinois	Plaster Sports Complex; Springfield, MO		L 21–33	13,020	
October 11		Youngstown State	Plaster Sports Complex; Springfield, MO		W 42–28		
October 18		at Illinois State	Hancock Stadium; Normal, IL		W 34–28	13,292	
October 25		No. 14 Southern Illinois	Plaster Sports Complex; Springfield, MO		L 17–23	6,485	
November 1		at South Dakota State	Coughlin–Alumni Stadium; Brookings, SD		L 13–43	6,117	
November 8	4:05 p.m.	at No. 4 Northern Iowa	UNI-Dome; Cedar Falls, IA	CFU/Mediacom	L 0–42	13,426	
November 15	1:00 p.m.	No. 25 North Dakota State	Plaster Sports Complex; Springfield, MO		L 27–48	3,920	
November 22		at Indiana State	Memorial Stadium; Terre Haute, IN		W 27–24 ^{OT}		
*Non-conference game; Rankings from The Sports Network Poll released prior to the game; All times are in Central time
