= Elmer O. Thompson =

North Dakota inventor (born 1890)

Elmer Olaf Thompson (1890–1983) was a photographer and inventor born in North Dakota.

== Early life and education ==
Thompson was born on December 24, 1890, in Osnabrock Township, Cavalier County, North Dakota. As a child he lived near Edmore, North Dakota, with his family. His father, T.O. Thompson, raised cattle and owned a meat market in town. In 1908 he attended his first year of high school in Blooming Prairie, Minnesota, where he became seriously interested in photography. He attended the North Dakota State Normal and Industrial School at Ellendale between 1909 and 1912 where he served as the school's official photographer and helped to produce the first yearbook Snitcher. He went to on the teach high school math and science in Pasco, Washington, from 1912 – 1914.

== Military service ==
He served in the U.S. Signal Corps in France, working with aircraft detection and airplane machine gun technology from 1917 to 1918.

From 1918 to 1919 he was unable to leave Europe until military ships were available. During that time, he made a banjo out of an artillery shell (now in the Smithsonian Institution ). It is also claimed (but not yet verified) that he played in Paris clubs; took classes at the University of Paris, including one from Marie Curie; and took French language instruction from Gustave Eiffel.

== Education at UC Berkeley ==
Elmer Thompson received his Bachelor of Science degree on May 12, 1920, from the University of California, Berkeley. He attended the College of Mechanics. Elmer first attended Berkeley from 1914 to 1917; he then joined the military and served in France. He returned at some point in 1919 to complete his work at Berkeley.

== Work life and patents ==
=== AT&T ===
Thompson is named as an inventor and awarded six patents regarding alternating-current relays. Each of these were filed between December 21, 1921, and July 19, 1922. They were issued no later than June 18, 1929, and were all assigned to the American Telephone and Telegraph Company.

=== Philco Radio and Television Corporation ===
He was awarded a total of 23 patents assigned to the Philco Radio and Television corporation in various areas related to phonographs. Each of these was filed between June 17, 1936, and July 28, 1959.

Notable patents include number 2,274,567 for a Circuit Controlling and Impulse Device, which disclosed the innovative 'Mystery Control' (wireless remote) featured with Philco's high-end radio consoles.

Patent 2,316,113 for a Photoelectric Phonograph disclosed the ‘Beam of Light’ phonograph.

=== Other assignees ===
One patent, for a step-by-step switch, 2,206,926, was filed June 3, 1939, and assigned by mesne assignments, to Pennsylvania Patents, Inc. Carson City, Nevada.

== Family ==
He married Elsie Anderson in 1930 and apparently developed a paternal relationship with her children, as his obituary lists survivors as John Anderson and Eileen Anderson Achllies. After Thompson's death, Achilles gave the remainder of his glass plates to Gordon Gronhovd, who took them back to North Dakota.

His obituary lists survivors as: stepson, John Anderson, Bethlehem, Pa.; stepdaughter Eileen Achilles, Staten Island, New York; one grandchild; one great-grandchild.

== Death ==
He died September 26, 1983, in DeBary, Florida, at the age of 92.
