= Travis O'Neel =

American football player (1978–2015)

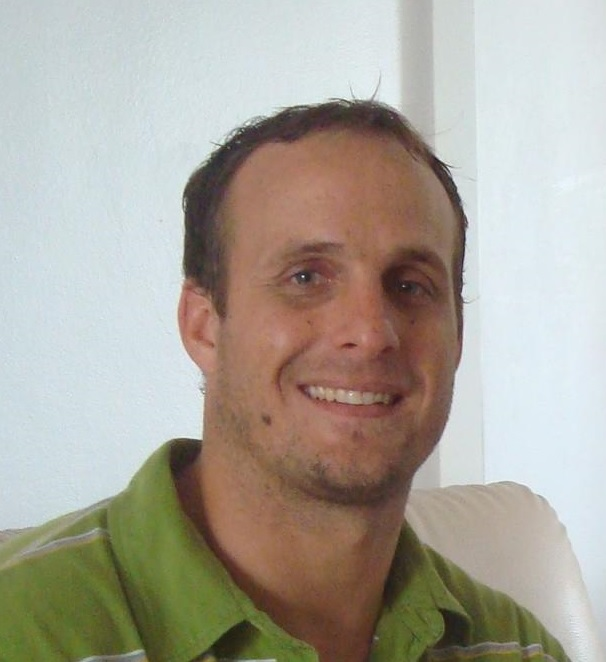
- Born: October 27, 1978; Minnesota, U.S.
- Died: June 24, 2015 (aged 36); Bangkok, Thailand
- Occupation: Teacher

Travis O'Neel (October 27, 1978 – June 24, 2015) was an American college football player and schoolteacher. He attended the University of North Dakota where he played as a linebacker for the North Dakota Fighting Sioux and was a captain of the 2001 national championship football team. He led the national title team in tackles and was a two-time Academic All-NCC selection. Head coach Bubba Schweigert described O'Neel as "one of our all-time greats." In 1999, Travis was named to the Sophomore All-America Team by USA Football.

After graduation from University of North Dakota, O'Neel began teaching in various parts of the world. He worked at the Lincoln School in Costa Rica, Ruamrudee International School in Bangkok, Thailand, and International School Manila in the Philippines.

O'Neel died in a motorbike accident on June 19, 2015, in Bangkok, Thailand. In the accident, O'Neel suffered two broken shins, a broken femur, a broken hip, a broken arm and a significant head injury to both his skull and brain. He left behind a wife and two young sons.

In a newscast, FOX9 News in Minneapolis claimed The University of North Dakota planned to create a Travis O'Neel Scholarship Fund to honor his life.
