= 1930 Northern Illinois State Evansmen football team =

American college football season

1930 Northern Illinois State Evansmen football
- Conference: Illinois Intercollegiate Athletic Conference
- Record: 6–2–1 (4–1–1 IIAC)
- Head coach: Chick Evans (2nd season)
- Captain: John McNamara
- Home stadium: Glidden Field

1930 Illinois Intercollegiate Athletic Conference football standings
	Conf.					Overall
Team	W		L		T	W		L		T
Southern Illinois +	5	–	0	–	0	9	–	0	–	0
Millikin +	4	–	0	–	0	5	–	2	–	0
Mount Morris +	3	–	0	–	0	9	–	0	–	0
Eastern Illinois	5	–	1	–	1	6	–	1	–	1
Northern Illinois State	4	–	1	–	1	6	–	2	–	1
Knox (IL)	4	–	1	–	0	5	–	2	–	1
Monmouth (IL)	5	–	2	–	0	5	–	4	–	0
Lake Forest	2	–	1	–	0	5	–	1	–	1
Illinois Wesleyan	4	–	2	–	0	6	–	2	–	0
Elmhurst	3	–	2	–	0	6	–	2	–	0
Augustana (IL)	3	–	2	–	0	4	–	3	–	0
North Central	2	–	2	–	1	6	–	2	–	1
Bradley	2	–	2	–	1	4	–	3	–	1
Carthage	3	–	3	–	0	3	–	4	–	1
Western Illinois	3	–	4	–	0	4	–	4	–	0
Shurtleff	2	–	3	–	0	6	–	4	–	0
St. Viator	3	–	5	–	0	3	–	6	–	0
Eureka	2	–	6	–	0	2	–	6	–	0
Illinois State Normal	1	–	7	–	0	1	–	7	–	0
Wheaton (IL)	0	–	4	–	0	2	–	6	–	0
McKendree	0	–	5	–	0	3	–	6	–	0
Illinois College	0	–	7	–	0	0	–	8	–	0
+ – Conference co-champions

The 1930 Northern Illinois State Evansmen football team represented Northern Illinois State Teachers College—now known as Northern Illinois University—as a member of the Illinois Intercollegiate Athletic Conference (IIAC) during the 1930 college football season. Led by second-year head coach Chick Evans, the Evansmen compiled an overall record of 6–2–1 with a mark of 4–1–1 in conference play, tying for fifth place in the IIAC. The team played home games at the 5,500-seat Glidden Field, located on the east end of campus, in DeKalb, Illinois.

== Schedule ==
Date	Opponent	Site	Result
September 26	at St. Viator	Bourbonnais, IL	W 18–0
October 4	Whitewater State*	Glidden Field; DeKalb, IL	W 7–0
October 11	at Wheaton (IL)	Wheaton, IL	W 35–0
October 18	at Illinois College	Jacksonville, IL	W 13–0
October 25	at Shurtleff	Alton, IL	L 0–7
November 1	at Milwaukee*	Marquette Stadium; Milwaukee, WI	L 13–20
November 7	Illinois State	Glidden Field; DeKalb, IL	W 19–7
November 11	Crane JC*	Glidden Field; DeKalb, IL	W 34–13
November 21	North Central	Glidden Field; DeKalb, IL	T 13–13
*Non-conference game
