= Dale Lennon =

American college football coach and athletics administrator

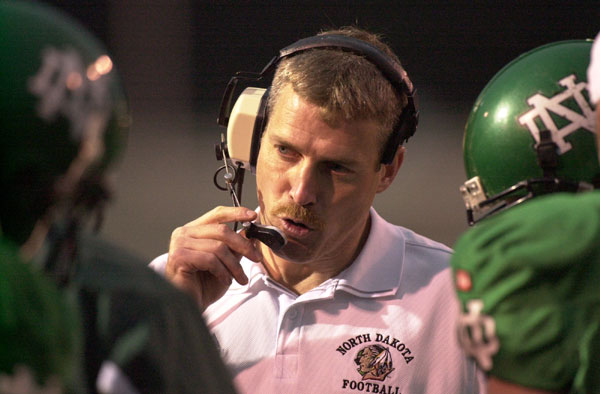
- Lennon coaching for UND in 2001

Biographical details
- Born: December 13, 1960 (age 65); Knox, North Dakota, U.S.

Playing career
- 1980, 1982–1983: North Dakota
- Position: Running back

Coaching career (HC unless noted)
- 1985: Northern State (GA)
- 1986: Valley City State (assistant)
- 1987: Dickinson State (assistant)
- 1988–1989: North Dakota (DL)
- 1990–1996: North Dakota (DC)
- 1997–1998: Mary
- 1999–2007: North Dakota
- 2008–2015: Southern Illinois

Administrative career (AD unless noted)
- 2017–2022: Mary

Head coaching record
- Overall: 153–75
- Tournaments: 0–1 (NAIA playoffs); 14–6 (NCAA D-II playoffs); 1–2 (NCAA D-I playoffs)

Accomplishments and honors

Championships
- 1 NCAA Division II (2001); 1 NDCAC (1998); 5 NCC (1999, 2001, 2003, 2005–2006); 2 MVFC (2008–2009)

Dale Lennon (born December 13, 1960) is an American former college football coach and athletics administrator. He served as the head football coach at the University of Mary in Bismarck, North Dakota from 1997 to 1998, the University of North Dakota from 1999 to 2007, and the Southern Illinois University Carbondale from 2007 to 2015, compiling a career record of 153–75. Lennon led the 2001 North Dakota Fighting Sioux football team to an NCAA Division II Football Championship. His record was 90–24 in nine seasons as the head coach of the North Dakota Fighting Sioux and he is the program's all-time winningest coach. In May 2017, Lennon returned to the University of Mary as the school's athletic director. He left University of Mary in 2022 to become the executive director of the State Historical Society of North Dakota Foundation.

== UND Hall of Fame Induction ==
Dale Lennon was inducted into the University of North Dakota Athletic Hall of Fame on October 12, 2023, at the Alerus Center. Lennon was head coach for nine seasons.

Lennon's connection to North Dakota extends to his playing days in the early 1980s, where he served as team captain of the football team in 1983.

== Head coaching record ==
Year	Team	Overall	Conference	Standing	Bowl/playoffs
Mary Marauders (North Dakota College Athletic Conference) (1997–1998)
1997	Mary	4–6	1–5	6th	
1998	Mary	8–3	5–1	T–1st	L NAIA First Round
Mary:		12–9	6–6		
North Dakota Fighting Sioux (North Central Conference) (1999–2007)
1999	North Dakota	9–2	8–1	T–1st	L NCAA Division II First Round
2000	North Dakota	8–3	6–3	T–3rd	
2001	North Dakota	14–1	7–1	1st	W NCAA Division II Championship
2002	North Dakota	5–6	3–5	7th	
2003	North Dakota	12–2	7–0	1st	L NCAA Division II Championship
2004	North Dakota	11–3	4–2	T–2nd	L NCAA Division II Semifinal
2005	North Dakota	10–3	4–2	T–1st	L NCAA Division II Second Round
2006	North Dakota	11–2	7–1	T–1st	L NCAA Division II Quarterfinal
2007	North Dakota	10–2	7–1	2nd	L NCAA Division II Second Round
North Dakota:		90–24	53–16		
Southern Illinois Salukis (Missouri Valley Football Conference) (2008–2015)
2008	Southern Illinois	9–3	7–1	T–1st	L NCAA Division I First Round
2009	Southern Illinois	11–2	8–0	1st	L NCAA Division I Quarterfinal
2010	Southern Illinois	5–6	4–4	T–3rd	
2011	Southern Illinois	4–7	2–6	T–7th	
2012	Southern Illinois	6–5	5–3	T–4th	
2013	Southern Illinois	7–5	5–3	T–2nd	
2014	Southern Illinois	6–6	3–5	T–7th	
2015	Southern Illinois	3–8	2–6	9th	
Southern Illinois:		51–42	36–28		
Total:		153–75			
National championship Conference title Conference division title or championship game berth
