= Bubba Schweigert =

American football coach (born 1962)

Biographical details
- Born: September 14, 1962 (age 64)
- Education: Jamestown College (1985)

Coaching career (HC unless noted)
- 1985–1988: Jamestown (DC)
- 1989: North Dakota (GA)
- 1990–1996: North Dakota (DB)
- 1997–2003: North Dakota (DC)
- 2004–2007: Minnesota Duluth
- 2008–2013: Southern Illinois (DC)
- 2014–2024: North Dakota

Head coaching record
- Overall: 88–78
- Tournaments: 0–1 (NCAA D-II playoffs); 1–5 (NCAA D-I playoffs)

Accomplishments and honors

Championships
- 1 NCC (2005); 1 Big Sky (2016); 1 MVFC (2020)

Kyle Frederick "Bubba" Schweigert (born September 15, 1962) is an American former football coach. From 2004 to 2007, Schweigert served as the head football coach at University of Minnesota Duluth. From 2008 to 2013 he was the defensive coordinator at Southern Illinois University, and from 2014 to 2024 he served as head coach at the University of North Dakota.

== Early coaching career ==
Schweigert started his coaching career at his alma mater, Jamestown College—now the University of Jamestown. He coached football at Jamestown from 1985 to 1988 and was admissions counselor and the head baseball coach.

In 1989, he began 15 seasons as an assistant coach at the University of North Dakota (UND), where he was part of eight NCAA playoff teams and six North Central Conference (NCC) title squads. In 1997, Schweigert was appointed to defensive coordinator, and in 2000, Schweigert was named the American Football Coaches Association Division II Assistant Coach of the Year. His 2001 defense, led by team captain Travis O'Neel, gave up only 191.4 yards of total offense per game limiting teams to an average of just 50.3 rushing yards and 12.5 points per game on the way to the program's first national championship. In 2002, Schweigert was honored with Jamestown's Rollie Greeno Award for outstanding commitment in the field of education and coaching, along with the team finishing second nationally in 2003.

Leaving UND after the 2003 season, Schweigert took his first college head coaching job at the University of Minnesota Duluth. He coached the school's NCAA Division II football program from 2004 to 2007. He guided the Bulldogs to a 22–21 overall record during this time, along with the team's first NCC title in 2005. The NCAA playoff berth that season was the program's second in four seasons. Schweigert was also named both the D2football.com Northwest Region Coach of the Year and the AFCA Division II Coach of the Year for Region 5 in 2005, as well.

== Coaching career at SIU ==
Throughout his coaching history at Southern Illinois University, Schweigert's coaching style has led the Salukis to defensive success, being ranked near the top of many aspects of defensive play. In 2013, he coached the Salukis defense to an average of 5.9 tackles for loss per game, ranking third in the Missouri Valley Conference (MVC), a defense ranking second in the MVC and tied for 18th in the nation in rush defense that held opponents to an average of 122.8 rushing yards per game, holding six of 12 opponents to fewer than 100 yards rushing and other teams to 50 rushing yards or fewer at least four times.

In 2012, Schweigert's Saluki defense ranked third in the MVC with 15 fumbles, tied for 10th most in the nation.

Schweigert's 2011 defense ranked third in the Missouri Valley Football Conference in total yardage, interceptions and sacks, as well as led the conference in total defense in 2010, giving up an average of 332.1 yards per game with the absence of four secondary-defensive starters. His 2009 defense ranked second nationally with 23 interceptions, and tied for fourth nationwide with 33 forced turnovers. In the same year, his group also ranked eighth nationally in scoring defense, allowing 15.92 points per game and led the MVC with 36 sacks. In 2008, Schweigert's defense was tied for 12th nationally in forced turnovers (29) and in five seasons his teams had forced an average of 2.2 turnovers per game (a total of 127).

== Coaching philosophy ==
Defensively, Schweigert follows a very aggressive style of football. He features a blitzing 3-4 scheme that emphasizes putting pressure on the offense and forcing short gains and high amounts of turnovers, believing these to be the pinnacles of a successful football team. A hallmark of Schweigert's defenses is to stop the run and attack the quarterback. He famously noted in the press conference announcing his hiring as head coach at North Dakota that, "We want the opposing quarterback and the quarterback's mother to be the two most uncomfortable people in the building".

Conversely, Schwiegert's North Dakota teams have been extremely conservative on the offensive side of the ball. They focus on establishing the run and controlling the time of possession, which hopes to limit the number of possessions for opposing offenses. It also allows his aggressive defense to stay rested. This style is a sharp contrast to the offense that was run in his earlier head coaching days at Minnesota Duluth. During his tenure there, the Bulldogs featured a high flying aerial attack capable of scoring points in bunches.

== Coaching awards and highlights ==
Named AFCA DII Assistant Coach of the Year (2000) Help lead the UND Fighting Sioux to a Division II National Championship (2001) Jamestown's Rollie Greeno Award (for outstanding commitment in the field of education and coaching) (2002) North Central Conference Coach of the Year (2005) Coached defensive end Ken Boatright (named an AFCA All-American and a third-team AP All-American) (2012), linebacker and 2012 graduate Jayson DiManche (Cincinnati Bengals), cornerback Korey Lindsey, a three-time All-American and a 2011 NFL draft pick (Cincinnati Bengals), and 2013, SIU linebacker Bryan Presume (earned first team All-MVFC honors) Named Big Sky Conference Coach of the Year (2016) Named AFCA FCS Region 5 Coach of the Year (2016)

== Personal life ==
Schweigert was born and raised in Zeeland, North Dakota, where he attended school at Jamestown College, graduating in 1985. He has a bachelor's degree in business administration from Jamestown College and a master's degree from North Dakota, being honored with Jamestown College's Rollie Greeno Award for Outstanding Commitment in the field of education and coaching. Schweigert and his wife, Laura Schweigert, live together with their two sons, Alex and Cooper.

== Head coaching record ==
Year	Team	Overall	Conference	Standing	Bowl/playoffs	Coaches^{#}	TSN/STATS^{°}
Minnesota Duluth Bulldogs (North Central Conference) (2004–2007)
2004	Minnesota Duluth	4–7	1–5	6th			
2005	Minnesota Duluth	8–4	4–2	T–1st	L NCAA Division II First Round		
2006	Minnesota Duluth	6–4	4–4	4th			
2007	Minnesota Duluth	4–6	3–5	T–5th			
Minnesota Duluth:		22–21	12–16				
University of North Dakota/North Dakota Fighting Hawks (Big Sky Conference) (2014–2017)
2014	North Dakota	5–7	3–5	T–8th			
2015	North Dakota	7–4	5–3	T–4th			
2016	North Dakota	9–3	8–0	T–1st	L NCAA Division I Second Round	12	12
2017	North Dakota	3–8	2–6	T–9th			
North Dakota Fighting Hawks (NCAA Division I FCS independent) (2018–2019)
2018	North Dakota	6–5					
2019	North Dakota	7–5			L NCAA Division I First Round		
North Dakota Fighting Hawks (Missouri Valley Football Conference) (2020–2024)
2020–21	North Dakota	5–2	4–1	T–1st	L NCAA Division I Quarterfinal	6	7
2021	North Dakota	5–6	3–5	T–7th			
2022	North Dakota	7–5	5–3	T–3rd	L NCAA Division I First Round		20
2023	North Dakota	7–5	5–3	T–3rd	L NCAA Division I First Round	14	12
2024	North Dakota	5–7	2–6	T–8th			
North Dakota:		66–57	37–32				
Total:		88–78					
National championship Conference title Conference division title or championship game berth
