= Zeeland, North Dakota =

- City
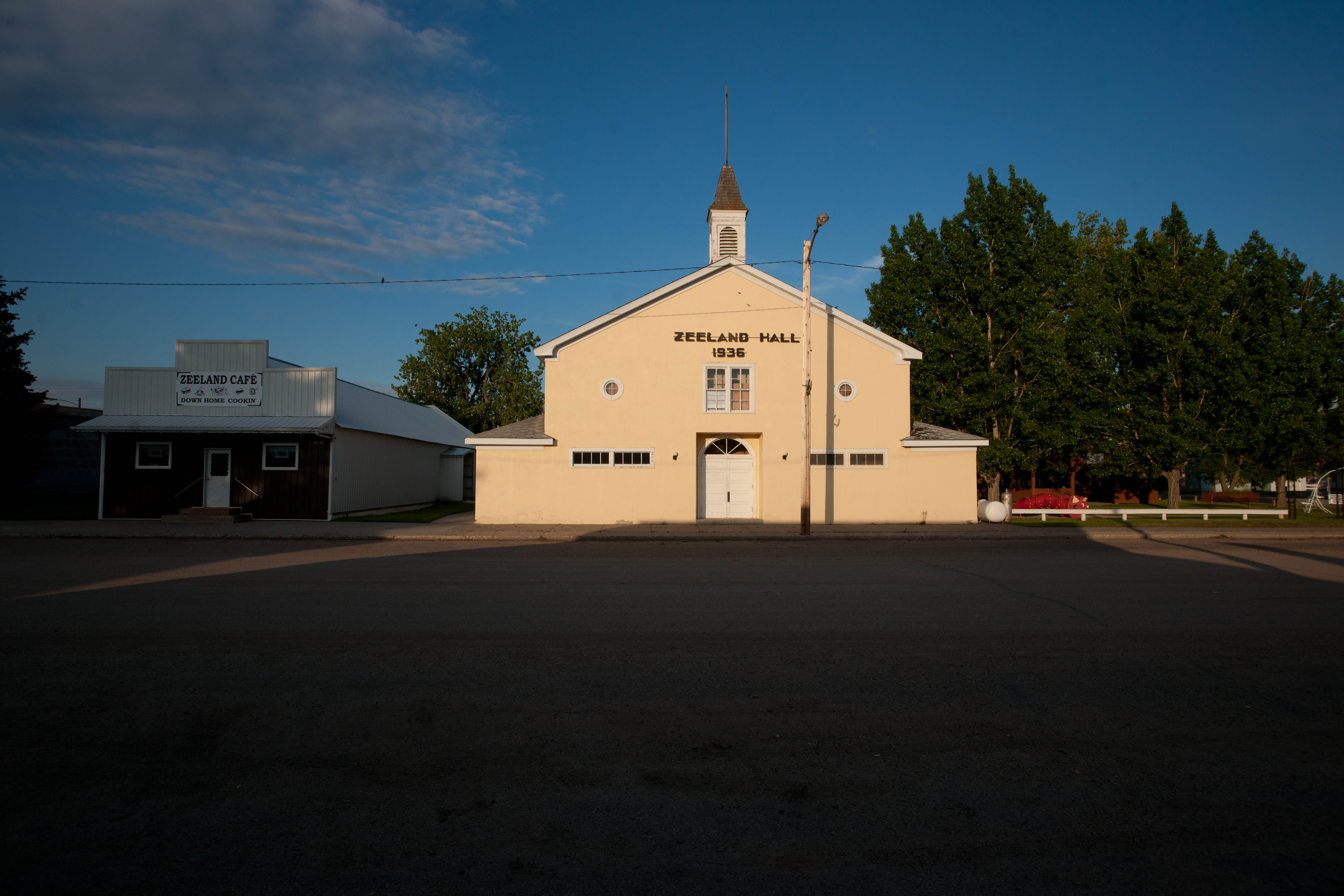
- Zeeland Hall, on the National Register of Historic Places
- Motto: Always sail forward, never sink
- Interactive map of Zeeland, North Dakota
- Location within North Dakota
- Coordinates: 45.9729°N 99.8324°W
- Country: United States
- State: North Dakota
- County: McIntosh
- Founded: 1902

Area
  - Total: 0.298 sq mi (0.771 km^{2})
  - Land: 0.298 sq mi (0.771 km^{2})
  - Water: 0 sq mi (0.000 km^{2}) 0.00%
- Elevation: 2,011 ft (613 m)

Population (2020)
  - Total: 82
  - Estimate (2025): 82
  - Density: 280/sq mi (110/km^{2})
- Time zone: UTC–6 (Central (CST))
  - Summer (DST): UTC–5 (CDT)
- ZIP Code: 58581
- Area code: 701
- FIPS code: 38-88180
- GNIS feature ID: 1036346

Zeeland is a city in McIntosh County, North Dakota, United States. The population was 82 as of the 2020 census, and was estimated at 82 in 2025.

== History ==
Zeeland was founded in 1902 by Dutch settlers. Its name is taken from the Dutch province of Zeeland.

Germans from Russia emigrated there in 1905 from Odessa (Odesa), Ukraine, building the first Catholic Church in North Dakota for Germans from Russia.

There are several Wrought-iron cross sites of St. John's Cemetery (Zeeland, North Dakota), in or near Zeeland, which are listed on the National Register of Historic Places.

== Geography ==
According to the United States Census Bureau, the city has a total area of 0.298 square miles (0.77 km^{2}), all land.

== Demographics ==
Historical population
Census	Pop.	Note	%±
1910	193		—
1920	323		67.4%
1930	419		29.7%
1940	489		16.7%
1950	484		−1.0%
1960	427		−11.8%
1970	313		−26.7%
1980	253		−19.2%
1990	197		−22.1%
2000	141		−28.4%
2010	86		−39.0%
2020	82		−4.7%
2025 (est.)	82		0.0%
U.S. Decennial Census; 2020 Census

=== 2020 census ===
As of the 2020 census, there were 82 people, 48 households, and 26 families residing in the city.

=== 2010 census ===
As of the census of 2010, there were 86 people, 48 households, and 25 families residing in the city. The population density was 286.7 inhabitants per square mile (110.7/km^{2}). There were 99 housing units at an average density of 330.0 per square mile (127.4/km^{2}). The racial makeup of the city was 98.8% White and 1.2% Native American. Hispanic or Latino of any race were 1.2% of the population.

There were 48 households, out of which 14.6% had children under the age of 18 living with them, 41.7% were married couples living together, 8.3% had a female householder with no husband present, 2.1% had a male householder with no wife present, and 47.9% were non-families. 45.8% of all households were made up of individuals, and 22.9% had someone living alone who was 65 years of age or older. The average household size was 1.79 and the average family size was 2.44.

The median age in the city was 56 years. 14% of residents were under the age of 18; 1.1% were between the ages of 18 and 24; 18.6% were from 25 to 44; 30.3% were from 45 to 64; and 36% were 65 years of age or older. The gender makeup of the city was 45.3% male and 54.7% female.

=== 2000 census ===
Languages (2000)	Percent
Spoke English at home	65.79%
Spoke German at home	34.21%

As of the 2000 census, there were 141 people, 73 households, and 40 families residing in the city. The population density was 471.2 inhabitants per square mile (181.9/km^{2}). There were 103 housing units at an average density of 344.2 per square mile (132.9/km^{2}). The racial makeup of the city was 98.58% White, 0.71% from other races, and 0.71% from two or more races. Hispanic or Latino people of any race were 0.71% of the population.

There were 73 households, out of which 19.2% had children under the age of 18 living with them, 45.2% were married couples living together, 6.8% had a female householder with no husband present, and 45.2% were non-families. 45.2% of all households were made up of individuals, and 37.0% had someone living alone who was 65 years of age or older. The average household size was 1.93 and the average family size was 2.65.

In the city, the population was spread out, with 19.1% under the age of 18, 5.0% from 18 to 24, 17.0% from 25 to 44, 18.4% from 45 to 64, and 40.4% who were 65 years of age or older. The median age was 57 years. For every 100 females, there were 98.6 males. For every 100 females age 18 and over, there were 96.6 males.

The median income for a household in the city was $18,000, and the median income for a family was $28,125. Males had a median income of $19,583 versus $17,500 for females. The per capita income for the city was $12,268. There were 14.8% of families and 29.1% of the population living below the poverty line, including 28.6% of under eighteens and 30.4% of those over 64.
