= Dick Koppenhaver =

American football player and coach (1931–2017)

Biographical details
- Born: April 7, 1931; Reeder, North Dakota, U.S.
- Died: July 23, 2017 (aged 86); Lenexa, Kansas, U.S.

Playing career

Football
- 1949–1952: North Dakota

Baseball
- 1950–1951: North Dakota
- Position: Quarterback (football)

Coaching career (HC unless noted)

Football
- 1962–1964: Valley City State
- 1965–1968: North Dakota State (assistant)
- 2001: North Dakota (QB)

Administrative career (AD unless noted)
- 1966–1968: North Dakota State
- c. 1970: North Central Conference (commissioner)

Head coaching record
- Overall: 17–6–1

Accomplishments and honors

Championships
- 2 NDCAC (1963–1964)

Richard George Koppenhaver (April 7, 1931 – July 23, 2017) was an American football player and coach. He served as the head football coach at Valley City State University in Valley City, North Dakota from 1962 to 1964.

Koppenhaver later served as an assistant football coach and athletic director at North Dakota State University. He also served as an assistant coach at the University of North Dakota during their 2001 championship season.

== Head coaching record ==
Year	Team	Overall	Conference	Standing	Bowl/playoffs
Valley City State Vikings (North Dakota Intercollegiate Conference / North Dakota College Athletic Conference) (1962–1964)
1962	Valley City State	4–4	4–2	T–3rd	
1963	Valley City State	6–1–1	5–0–1	1st	
1964	Valley City State	7–1	5–1	T–1st	
Valley City State:		17–6–1	14–3–1		
Total:		17–6–1			
National championship Conference title Conference division title or championship game berth
