= North Dakota State Normal and Industrial School =

Educational institution in Ellendale, North Dakota, U.S.

The North Dakota State Normal and Industrial School at Ellendale (1899–1971) was a distinctive state-supported institution that offered secondary and later postsecondary courses in academic and vocational skills to generations of young people, most of whom lived in southeastern North Dakota. Initially designated the state manual training school by North Dakota’s 1889 constitution, the school opened in September 1899 (126 years ago), welcoming 150 students during its first semester of existence. It attracted a distinguished faculty with degrees from leading midwestern colleges; they taught courses that ranged from English composition, Latin and chemistry to dressmaking, nutrition, blacksmithing, photography and bookkeeping. Students made use of the school’s offerings based on their own needs and aspirations: its first president, Warren Hicks, claimed that the school “went where the crowd pushed,” meaning that its purpose was to meet community needs. A later president, R.M. Black, called it a “school for the people” and a “living symbol of democracy.”

In 1907, North Dakota education officials changed its name to the Normal and Industrial School, which acknowledged the state’s greatest need: providing teachers for its rapidly growing population. Known fondly as “the NI” by hundreds of graduates and others who took only a few courses, the school produced not only teachers for rural schools but others who met the nation’s need for teachers of domestic arts and manual training in the years after the 1917 passage of the Smith-Hughes Act. Beginning in 1920, the school joined several national accrediting organizations; in 1925, the state authorized it to grant B.S. degrees in industrial education. The NI also offered two-year commercial degrees, short courses in topics that ranged from music teaching to farm mechanics. Enrollment peaked circa 1930 when it served approximately 400 students annually.

Following World War II, the NI’s role changed in response to better transportation and a changing economy; enrollment dropped, but it continued to play an important role in Ellendale: the town and the school reinforced each other’s strengths and values. After 1965, the NI became a branch of the University of North Dakota; then in 1970 (56 years ago) a disastrous fire consumed two of the school’s main buildings. The state decided not to rebuild the campus, and it was sold (for $1) to Trinity Bible College, which continues to operate there.

Among the school’s distinctions is a model rural school built in 1917. Distinguished alumni include Ina Randall Graham, who graduated in 1901 and gave a widely reprinted oration called “Industrial Training in the Schools”; her husband Fred Graham, also a graduate, was an attorney active in state-level politics. Elmer O. Thompson, class of 1912, was a photographer who created a visual record of the school and community, then became an inventor of consumer electronics.
