= 2007 UC Davis Aggies football team =

American college football season

2007 UC Davis Aggies football
- Conference: Great West Conference
- Record: 5–6 (1–3 GWC)
- Head coach: Bob Biggs (15th season)
- Offensive coordinator: Mike Moroski (15th season)
- Home stadium: Aggie Stadium

2007 Great West Conference football standings
	Conf.			Overall
Team	W		L	W		L
No. 19 South Dakota State $	4	–	0	7	–	4
No. 9 North Dakota State	3	–	1	10	–	1
No. 24 Cal Poly	2	–	2	7	–	4
UC Davis	1	–	3	5	–	6
Southern Utah	0	–	4	0	–	11
$ – Conference champion; Rankings from The Sports Network poll

The 2007 UC Davis football team represented the University of California, Davis as a member of the Great West Conference (GWC) during the 2007 NCAA Division I FCS football season. Led by 15th-year head coach Bob Biggs, UC Davis compiled an overall record of 5–6 with a mark of 1–3 in conference play, placing fourth in the GWC. The losing record ended a streak of 37 consecutive winning season for the program. The team was outscored by its opponents 349 to 306 for the season. The Aggies played home games at the newly-opened Aggie Stadium in Davis, California.

== Schedule ==
Date	Opponent	Site	Result	Attendance	Source
September 1	Western Washington*	Aggie Stadium; Davis, CA	L 21–28	9,690	
September 8	at No. 18 Portland State*	PGE Park; Portland, OR	W 26–17	12,220	
September 15	at Eastern Washington*	Woodward Field; Cheney, WA	L 31–41	4,138	
September 22	Northeastern*	Aggie Stadium; Davis, CA	W 28–10	7,140	
September 29	at San Jose State*	Spartan Stadium; San Jose, CA	L 14–34	17,431	
October 6	at No. 3 North Dakota State	Fargodome; Fargo, ND	L 16–35	19,011	
October 13	No. 22 Cal Poly	Aggie Stadium; Davis, CA (Battle for the Golden Horseshoe)	L 28–63	10,743	
October 20	at Southern Utah	Eccles Coliseum; Cedar City, UT	W 41–21	1,988	
October 27	South Dakota State	Aggie Stadium; Davis, CA	L 21–28	9,375	
November 3	at Sacramento State*	Hornet Stadium; Sacramento, CA (Causeway Classic)	W 31–26	13,073	
November 17	San Diego*	Aggie Stadium; Davis, CA	W 49–46		
*Non-conference game; Rankings from The Sports Network Poll released prior to the game

== UC Davis players in the NFL ==
No UC Davis Aggies players were selected in the 2008 NFL draft. The following finished their UC Davis career in 2007, were not drafted, but played in the NFL:

Player	Position	First NFL team
Daniel Fells	Tight end	2008 St. Louis Rams
