= 2007 NCAA Division I FCS football season =

American college football season

2007 NCAA Division I FCS season
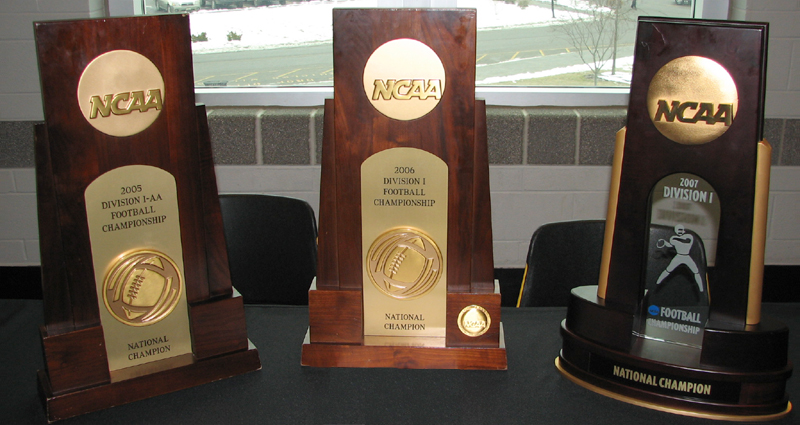
- 2007 FCS National Championship trophy (right).

Regular season
- Number of teams: 122
- Duration: August 25 – November 17
- Payton Award: Jayson Foster
- Buchanan Award: Kroy Biermann

Playoff
- Duration: November 23 – December 14
- Championship date: December 14, 2007
- Championship site: Finley Stadium; Chattanooga, Tennessee
- Champion: Appalachian State

NCAA Division I FCS football seasons
- «2006 2008»

The 2007 NCAA Division I FCS football season, the 2007 season of college football for teams in the Football Championship Subdivision (FCS), began on August 25, 2007, and concluded on December 14, 2007, in Chattanooga, Tennessee, at the 2007 NCAA Division I Football Championship Game, where the Appalachian State Mountaineers defeated the Delaware Fightin' Blue Hens to win the NCAA Division I Football Championship.

== Conference changes and new programs ==
- The Atlantic 10 Conference ceased football sponsorship after the 2006 season. The A10's football sponsorship was effectively taken over by the Colonial Athletic Association (today's Coastal Athletic Association), with all twelve of the A10 football members (Delaware, Hofstra, James Madison, Maine, Massachusetts, New Hampshire, Northeastern, Rhode Island, Richmond, Towson, Villanova, and William & Mary) moving to the CAA for the 2007 season. (NOTE: CAA Football remained, technically, a separate entity but was operated by the same conference office).

School	2006 Conference	2007 Conference
Austin Peay	FCS Independent	Ohio Valley
Central Arkansas	FCS Independent	Southland
Presbyterian	South Atlantic (D-II)	FCS Independent
St. Peter's	MAAC	Dropped Program
Stony Brook	Northeast	FCS Independent
Western Kentucky	Gateway	FBS Independent
Winston-Salem State	FCS Independent	MEAC

== FCS team wins over FBS teams ==
- September 1 – No. 1 (FCS) Appalachian State 34, No. 5 (FBS) Michigan 32 (Game notes)
- September 1 – Nicholls State 16, Rice 14
- September 8 – Northern Iowa 24, Iowa State 13
- September 8 – Southern Illinois 34, Northern Illinois 31
- September 15 – McNeese State 38, Louisiana-Lafayette 17
- September 15 – New Hampshire 48, Marshall 35
- September 22 – North Dakota State 44, Central Michigan 14
- October 20 – North Dakota State 27, Minnesota 21
- October 27 – Delaware 59, Navy 52

== Conference standings ==
2007 Big Sky Conference football standings
	Conf.			Overall
Team	W		L	W		L
No. 10 Montana $^	8	–	0	11	–	1
No. 8 Eastern Washington ^	6	–	2	9	–	4
Northern Arizona	5	–	3	6	–	5
Montana State	4	–	4	6	–	5
Weber State	4	–	4	5	–	6
Portland State	3	–	5	3	–	8
Sacramento State	3	–	5	3	–	8
Idaho State	2	–	6	3	–	8
Northern Colorado	1	–	7	1	–	11
$ – Conference champion; ^ – FCS playoff participant; Rankings from The Sports Network poll

2007 Big South Conference football standings
	Conf.			Overall
Team	W		L	W		L
Liberty $	4	–	0	8	–	3
Coastal Carolina	3	–	1	5	–	6
Gardner–Webb	2	–	2	5	–	6
Charleston Southern	1	–	3	5	–	6
VMI	0	–	4	2	–	9
$ – Conference champion

2007 Colonial Athletic Association football standings
	Conf.			Overall
Team	W		L	W		L
North Division
No. 7 UMass x+^	7	–	1	10	–	3
Hofstra	4	–	4	7	–	4
No. 14 New Hampshire ^	4	–	4	7	–	5
Maine	3	–	5	4	–	7
Northeastern	2	–	6	3	–	8
Rhode Island	2	–	6	3	–	8
South Division
No. 5 Richmond x+^	7	–	1	11	–	3
No. 12 James Madison ^	6	–	2	8	–	4
No. 2 Delaware ^	5	–	3	11	–	4
Villanova	5	–	3	7	–	4
William & Mary	2	–	6	4	–	7
Towson	1	–	7	3	–	8
+ – Conference co-champions; x – Division champion/co-champions; ^ – FCS playoff participant; Rankings from The Sports Network poll

2007 Gateway Football Conference standings
	Conf.			Overall
Team	W		L	W		L
No. 4 Northern Iowa $^	6	–	0	12	–	1
No. 3 Southern Illinois ^	5	–	1	12	–	2
No. 16 Youngstown State	3	–	3	7	–	4
Western Illinois	3	–	3	6	–	5
Missouri State	2	–	4	6	–	5
Illinois State	2	–	4	4	–	7
Indiana State	0	–	6	0	–	11
$ – Conference champion; ^ – FCS playoff participant; Rankings from The Sports Network poll

2007 Great West Conference football standings
	Conf.			Overall
Team	W		L	W		L
No. 19 South Dakota State $	4	–	0	7	–	4
No. 9 North Dakota State	3	–	1	10	–	1
No. 24 Cal Poly	2	–	2	7	–	4
UC Davis	1	–	3	5	–	6
Southern Utah	0	–	4	0	–	11
$ – Conference champion; Rankings from The Sports Network poll

2007 Ivy League football standings
	Conf.			Overall
Team	W		L	W		L
No. 21 Harvard $	7	–	0	8	–	2
No. 22 Yale	6	–	1	9	–	1
Brown	4	–	3	5	–	5
Penn	3	–	4	4	–	6
Princeton	3	–	4	4	–	6
Dartmouth	3	–	4	3	–	7
Cornell	2	–	5	5	–	5
Columbia	0	–	7	1	–	9
$ – Conference champion; Rankings from The Sports Network poll

2007 Metro Atlantic Athletic Conference football standings
	Conf.			Overall
Team	W		L	W		L
Iona +	2	–	1	7	–	4
Duquesne +	2	–	1	6	–	4
Marist +	2	–	1	3	–	8
La Salle	0	–	3	0	–	10
+ – Conference co-champions

2007 Mid-Eastern Athletic Conference football standings
	Conf.			Overall
Team	W		L	W		L
No. 15 Delaware State $^	9	–	0	10	–	2
Norfolk State	7	–	2	8	–	3
South Carolina State	7	–	2	7	–	4
Hampton	5	–	4	6	–	5
Winston-Salem State	5	–	4	6	–	5
Morgan State	4	–	5	5	–	6
Bethune–Cookman	3	–	6	5	–	6
Howard	3	–	6	4	–	7
Florida A&M	2	–	7	3	–	8
North Carolina A&T	0	–	9	0	–	11
$ – Conference champion; ^ – FCS playoff participant; Rankings from The Sports Network poll

2007 Northeast Conference football standings
	Conf.			Overall
Team	W		L	W		L
Albany $	6	–	0	8	–	4
Central Connecticut State	4	–	2	6	–	5
Wagner	3	–	3	7	–	4
Monmouth	3	–	3	4	–	6
Robert Morris	3	–	3	4	–	6
Saint Francis (PA)	2	–	4	3	–	7
Sacred Heart	0	–	6	3	–	8
$ – Conference champion

2007 Ohio Valley Conference football standings
	Conf.			Overall
Team	W		L	W		L
No. 13 Eastern Kentucky $^	8	–	0	9	–	3
No. 18 Eastern Illinois ^	7	–	1	8	–	4
Austin Peay	5	–	3	7	–	4
Jacksonville State	5	–	3	6	–	5
Tennessee State	4	–	3	5	–	6
Tennessee–Martin	4	–	4	4	–	7
Samford	2	–	6	4	–	7
Tennessee Tech	2	–	6	4	–	7
Southeast Missouri State	1	–	6	3	–	8
Murray State	1	–	7	2	–	9
$ – Conference champion; ^ – FCS playoff participant; Rankings from The Sports Network poll

2007 Patriot League football standings
	Conf.			Overall
Team	W		L	W		L
No. 20 Fordham $^	5	–	1	8	–	4
Colgate	4	–	2	7	–	4
Holy Cross	4	–	2	7	–	4
Lafayette	4	–	2	7	–	4
Lehigh	2	–	4	5	–	6
Bucknell	1	–	5	3	–	8
Georgetown	1	–	5	1	–	10
$ – Conference champion; ^ – FCS playoff participant; Rankings from The Sports Network poll

2007 Pioneer Football League standings
	Conf.			Overall
Team	W		L	W		L
Dayton +	6	–	1	11	–	1
San Diego +	6	–	1	9	–	2
Morehead State	5	–	2	7	–	4
Davidson	4	–	3	6	–	4
Drake	3	–	4	6	–	5
Valparaiso	2	–	5	5	–	6
Jacksonville	2	–	5	3	–	8
Butler	0	–	7	4	–	7
+ – Conference co-champions

2007 Southern Conference football standings
	Conf.			Overall
Team	W		L	W		L
No. 1 Appalachian State +^	5	–	2	13	–	2
No. 6 Wofford +^	5	–	2	9	–	4
No. 17 Georgia Southern	4	–	3	7	–	4
No. 23 Elon	4	–	3	7	–	4
The Citadel	4	–	3	7	–	4
Furman	4	–	3	6	–	5
Chattanooga	2	–	5	2	–	9
Western Carolina	0	–	7	1	–	10
+ – Conference co-champions; ^ – FCS playoff participant; Rankings from The Sports Network poll

2007 Southland Conference football standings
	Conf.			Overall
Team	W		L	W		L
No. 11 McNeese State $^	7	–	0	11	–	1
Sam Houston State	5	–	2	7	–	4
Central Arkansas*	5	–	2	6	–	5
Nicholls State	3	–	4	6	–	5
Texas State	3	–	4	4	–	7
Northwestern State	3	–	4	4	–	7
Southeastern Louisiana	2	–	5	3	–	8
Stephen F. Austin	0	–	7	0	–	11
$ – Conference champion; ^ – FCS playoff participant; * – Ineligible for postseason play due to transition from NCAA Division II; Rankings from The Sports Network poll

2007 Southwestern Athletic Conference football standings
	Conf.			Overall
Team	W		L	W		L
East Division
Jackson State xy$	7	–	2	8	–	4
Alabama A&M	6	–	3	3	–	3
Alabama State	4	–	5	5	–	6
Mississippi Valley State	2	–	7	3	–	8
Alcorn State	2	–	7	2	–	8
West Division
No. 25 Grambling State xy	8	–	1	8	–	4
Southern	6	–	3	8	–	3
Prairie View A&M	6	–	3	7	–	3
Arkansas–Pine Bluff	4	–	5	4	–	7
Texas Southern	0	–	9	0	–	11
Championship: Jackson State 42, Grambling State 31
$ – Conference champion; x – Division champion/co-champions; y – Championship game participant; Rankings from The Sports Network Poll

2007 NCAA Division I FCS independents football standings
	Conf.			Overall
Team	W		L	W		L
Western Kentucky		–		7	–	5
Stony Brook		–		6	–	5
Presbyterian		–		6	–	5
Savannah State		–		1	–	9

== Conference champions ==
=== Automatic berths ===
Conference	Champion
Big Sky Conference	Montana and Eastern Washington
Colonial Athletic Association	Massachusetts and Richmond
Gateway Football Conference	Northern Iowa
Mid-Eastern Athletic Conference	Delaware State
Ohio Valley Conference	Eastern Kentucky
Patriot League	Fordham
Southern Conference	Appalachian State and Wofford
Southland Conference	McNeese State

=== Invitation ===
Conference	Champion
Big South Conference	Liberty
Great West Football Conference	South Dakota State
Metro Atlantic Athletic Conference	Duquesne, Iona, and Marist
Northeast Conference	Albany
Pioneer Football League	Dayton

=== Abstains ===
Conference	Champion
Ivy League	Harvard
Southwestern Athletic Conference	Jackson State

== Postseason ==
=== NCAA Division I playoff bracket ===
First Round
November 23 and 24
Campus sites

Quarterfinals
December 1
Campus sites

Semifinals
December 7 and 8
Campus sites

National Championship Game

December 14
Finley Stadium
Chattanooga, Tennessee

New Hampshire
35

1
Northern Iowa*
38

1
Northern Iowa*
27

Delaware
39

Delaware State
7

Delaware*
44

Delaware
20

4
Southern Illinois*
17

Eastern Illinois
11

4
Southern Illinois*
30

4
Southern Illinois*
34

UMass
27

Fordham
35

UMass*
49

12
Delaware
21

5
Appalachian State*
49

Eastern Washington
44

2
McNeese State*
15

Eastern Washington
35

Appalachian State*
38

James Madison
27

Appalachian State*
28

Appalachian State*
55

Richmond
35

Wofford
23

3
Montana*
22

Wofford*
10

Richmond
21

Eastern Kentucky
14

Richmond*
31

* Host institution

=== SWAC Championship Game ===
Date	Location	Venue	West Div. Champion	East Div. Champion	Result
December 15	Birmingham, Alabama	Legion Field	Grambling State	Jackson State	Jackson State, 42–31

=== Gridiron Classic ===
The Gridiron Classic is an annual game between the champions of the Northeast Conference and the Pioneer Football League that has been held since December 2006.

Date	Location	Venue	NEC Champion	PFL Champion	Result
December 1	Dayton, Ohio	Welcome Stadium	Albany	Dayton	Dayton, 42–21

== Final poll standings ==
Standings are from The Sports Network final 2007 poll.

Rank	Team	Record
1	Appalachian State Mountaineers	13–2
2	Delaware Fightin' Blue Hens	11–4
3	Southern Illinois Salukis	13–2
4	Northern Iowa Panthers	12–1
5	Richmond Spiders	11–3
6	Wofford Terriers	9–4
7	Massachusetts Minutemen	10–3
8	Eastern Washington Eagles	9–4
9	North Dakota State Bison	10–1
10	Montana Grizzlies	11–1
11	McNeese State Cowboys	11–1
12	James Madison Dukes	8–4
13	Eastern Kentucky Colonels	9–3
14	New Hampshire Wildcats	7–5
15	Delaware State Hornets	10–2
16	Youngstown State Penguins	7–4
17	Georgia Southern Eagles	7–4
18	Eastern Illinois Panthers	8–4
19	South Dakota State Jackrabbits	7–4
20	Fordham Rams	8–4
21	Harvard Crimson	8–2
22	Yale Bulldogs	9–1
23	Elon Phoenix	7–4
24	Cal Poly Mustangs	7–4
25	Grambling State Tigers	8–4

== Rule changes for 2007 ==
The clock rules adopted in the 2006 season were reversed, after coaches in all divisions disapproved of them. The attempt to reduce the time of games sought by those rules was successful, reducing the average college football game from 3 hours and 21 minutes in 2005 to 3 hours and 7 seven minutes in 2006. The reduced game time also reduced the average number of plays in a game by 13, fewer offensive yards per game by 66, and average points per game by 5.

Rules changes for the 2007 season include:

- Moving the kick-off yard-line from 35 to 30, which matches the yard-line used in the National Football League, to reduce the number of touchbacks.
- Paring the 25-second play clock to 15 seconds after TV timeouts.
- Shortening teams' three allotted timeouts per half by 30 seconds each, from 1:25 to 55 seconds.
- Allowing penalties against the kicking team on kickoffs to be assessed at the end of the runback, avoiding a re-kick, also matching the NFL rule.

== See also ==
=== Historic games ===
- 2007 Appalachian State vs. Michigan football game — first win ever by an FCS team over a ranked FBS team
- 2007 Weber State vs. Portland State football game — the two teams combined for 141 points, setting an NCAA all-division record for most points scored in a game
