= 2007 Northern Arizona Lumberjacks football team =

American college football season

2007 Northern Arizona Lumberjacks football
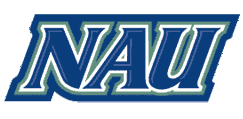
- Conference: Big Sky Conference
- Record: 6–5 (5–3 Big Sky)
- Head coach: Jerome Souers (10th season)
- Home stadium: Walkup Skydome

2007 Big Sky Conference football standings
| | Conf. | | | Overall |
| Team | W | | L | W | | L |
|---|---|---|---|---|---|---|
| No. 10 Montana $^ | 8 | – | 0 | 11 | – | 1 |
| No. 8 Eastern Washington ^ | 6 | – | 2 | 9 | – | 4 |
| Northern Arizona | 5 | – | 3 | 6 | – | 5 |
| Montana State | 4 | – | 4 | 6 | – | 5 |
| Weber State | 4 | – | 4 | 5 | – | 6 |
| Portland State | 3 | – | 5 | 3 | – | 8 |
| Sacramento State | 3 | – | 5 | 3 | – | 8 |
| Idaho State | 2 | – | 6 | 3 | – | 8 |
| Northern Colorado | 1 | – | 7 | 1 | – | 11 |
$ – Conference champion; ^ – FCS playoff participant; Rankings from The Sports Network poll

The 2007 Northern Arizona Lumberjacks football team was an American football team that represented Northern Arizona University (NAU) as a member of the Big Sky Conference (Big Sky) during the 2007 NCAA Division I FCS football season. In their tenth year under head coach Jerome Souers, the Lumberjacks compiled a 6–5 record (5–3 against conference opponents), outscored opponents by a total of 322 to 305, and finished third out of nine teams in the Big Sky.

The team played its home games at the J. Lawrence Walkup Skydome, commonly known as the Walkup Skydome, in Flagstaff, Arizona.

== Schedule ==
| Date | Opponent | Site | Result | Attendance | Source |
|---|---|---|---|---|---|
| August 30 | Western New Mexico* | Walkup Skydome; Flagstaff, AZ | W 47–0 | | |
| September 8 | at Arizona* | Arizona Stadium; Tucson, AZ | L 24–45 | 52,638 | |
| September 15 | at No. 1 Appalachian State* | Kidd Brewer Stadium; Boone, NC | L 21–34 | 27,104 | |
| September 22 | Northern Colorado | Walkup Skydome; Flagstaff, AZ | W 34–14 | | |
| September 29 | at Sacramento State | Hornet Stadium; Sacramento, CA | L 9–38 | 6,194 | |
| October 6 | at Portland State | PGE Park; Portland, OR | W 44–43 | | |
| October 13 | Idaho State | Walkup Skydome; Flagstaff, AZ | W 45–24 | 9,831 | |
| October 20 | at Weber State | Stewart Stadium; Ogden, UT | W 29–20 | 3,492 | |
| October 27 | No. 3 Montana | Walkup Skydome; Flagstaff, AZ | L 16–21 | 8,364 | |
| November 3 | at Montana State | Bobcat Stadium; Bozeman, MT | W 29–14 | | |
| November 10 | No. 20 Eastern Washington | Walkup Skydome; Flagstaff, AZ | L 24–52 | 4,166 | |
*Non-conference game; Rankings from The Sports Network Poll released prior to the game
