= 2007 Albany Great Danes football team =

American college football season

2007 Albany Great Danes football

NEC champion

Gridiron Classic, L 21–42 at Dayton
- Conference: Northeast Conference
- Record: 8–4 (6–0 NEC)
- Head coach: Bob Ford (38th season)
- Offensive coordinator: Peter Rossomando (3rd season)
- Defensive coordinator: Mike Simpson (21st season)
- Home stadium: University Field

2007 Northeast Conference football standings
| | Conf. | | | Overall |
| Team | W | | L | W | | L |
|---|---|---|---|---|---|---|
| Albany $ | 6 | – | 0 | 8 | – | 4 |
| Central Connecticut State | 4 | – | 2 | 6 | – | 5 |
| Wagner | 3 | – | 3 | 7 | – | 4 |
| Monmouth | 3 | – | 3 | 4 | – | 6 |
| Robert Morris | 3 | – | 3 | 4 | – | 6 |
| Saint Francis (PA) | 2 | – | 4 | 3 | – | 7 |
| Sacred Heart | 0 | – | 6 | 3 | – | 8 |
$ – Conference champion

The 2007 Albany Great Danes football team represented the University at Albany, SUNY as a member of the Northeast Conference (NEC) during the 2007 NCAA Division I FCS football season. Led by 38-year head coach Bob Ford, the Great Danes compiled an overall record of 8–4 with a mark of 6–0 in conference play, winning the NEC. Albany represented the NEC in the Gridiron Classic, losing to Dayton, co-champion of the Pioneer Football League (PFL). The team played home games at University Field in Albany New York.

== Schedule ==
| Date | Time | Opponent | Site | TV | Result | Attendance | Source |
|---|---|---|---|---|---|---|---|
| September 1 | 1:00 pm | at Colgate* | Andy Kerr Stadium; Hamilton, NY | | L 11–13 | 5,226 | |
| September 8 | 6:00 pm | at Fordham* | Coffey Field; Bronx, NY | | W 23–20 | 3,717 | |
| September 15 | 6:00 pm | No. 19 Hofstra* | University Field; Albany, NY | | L 13–28 | 4,106 | |
| September 22 | 3:05 pm | at No. 2 Montana* | Washington–Grizzly Stadium; Missoula, MT | KPAX | L 14–35 | 23,097 | |
| October 6 | 4:00 pm | Stony Brook* | University Field; Albany, NY (rivalry) | | W 24–23 | 1,740 | |
| October 13 | 4:00 pm | Sacred Heart^{†} | University Field; Albany, NY | | W 38–7 | 6,419 | |
| October 20 | 1:00 pm | at Saint Francis (PA) | DeGol Field; Loretto, PA | | W 58–21 | 1,172 | |
| October 27 | 1:00 pm | at Wagner | Wagner College Stadium; Staten Island, NY | | W 24–10 | 688 | |
| November 3 | 1:00 pm | Robert Morris | University Field; Albany, NY | | W 45–17 | 2,283 | |
| November 10 | 1:00 pm | at Monmouth | Kessler Field; West Long Branch, NJ | | W 21–3 | 3,223 | |
| November 17 | 12:00 pm | at Central Connecticut State | Arute Field; New Britain, CT | | W 49–14 | 3,064 | |
| December 1 | 1:00 pm | at Dayton* | Welcome Stadium; Dayton, OH (Gridiron Classic) | | L 21–42 | 2,703 | |
*Non-conference game; ^{†}Homecoming; Rankings from The Sports Network Poll released prior to the game; All times are in Eastern time
