= 2007 Iona Gaels football team =

American college football season

2007 Iona Gaels football

MAAC co-champion
- Conference: Metro Atlantic Athletic Conference
- Record: 7–4 (2–1 MAAC)
- Head coach: Fred Mariani (10th season)
- Home stadium: Mazzella Field

2007 Metro Atlantic Athletic Conference football standings
	Conf.			Overall
Team	W		L	W		L
Iona +	2	–	1	7	–	4
Duquesne +	2	–	1	6	–	4
Marist +	2	–	1	3	–	8
La Salle	0	–	3	0	–	10
+ – Conference co-champions

The 2007 Iona Gaels football team was an American football team that represented Iona College (now known as Iona University) as a member of the Metro Atlantic Athletic Conference (MAAC) during the 2007 NCAA Division I FCS football season. In their tenth year under head coach Fred Mariani, the team compiled an overall record of 7–4, with a mark of 2–1 in conference play, and finished as MAAC co-champion along with Duquesne and Marist.

== Schedule ==
Date	Time	Opponent	Site	Result	Attendance	Source
September 1	1:00 p.m.	Delaware Valley*	Mazzella Field; New Rochelle, NY	W 14–12	1,685	
September 8	1:00 p.m.	Wagner*	Mazzella Field; New Rochelle, NY	W 17–14 ^{OT}	1,130	
September 15	1:00 p.m.	Sacred Heart*	Mazzella Field; New Rochelle, NY	W 34–10	1,703	
September 22	7:00 p.m.	at Western Connecticut*	The WAC; Danbury, CT	L 37–41	1,618	
September 29	7:00 p.m.	at Stonehill*	W. B. Mason Stadium; Easton, MA	W 30–10	2,400	
October 6	1:00 p.m.	at La Salle	McCarthy Stadium; Philadelphia, PA	W 56–3	2,136	
October 13	12:00 p.m.	at No. 13 New Hampshire*	Cowell Stadium; Durham, NH	L 21–49	11,068	
October 27	1:00 p.m.	Duquesne^{†}	Mazzella Field; New Rochelle, NY	W 28–23	3,623	
November 3	12:00 p.m.	at Pace*	Northwell Stadium; Pleasantville, NY	W 34–3	1,480	
November 10	1:00 p.m.	Marist	Mazzella Field; New Rochelle, NY	L 14–17	2,305	
November 17	7:05 p.m.	at No. 25 Cal Poly*	Alex G. Spanos Stadium; San Luis Obispo, CA	L 7–55	7,727	
*Non-conference game; ^{†}Homecoming; Rankings from The Sports Network Poll released prior to the game; All times are in Eastern time
