= Portland State Vikings football under Jerry Glanville =

American football team 2007–2009

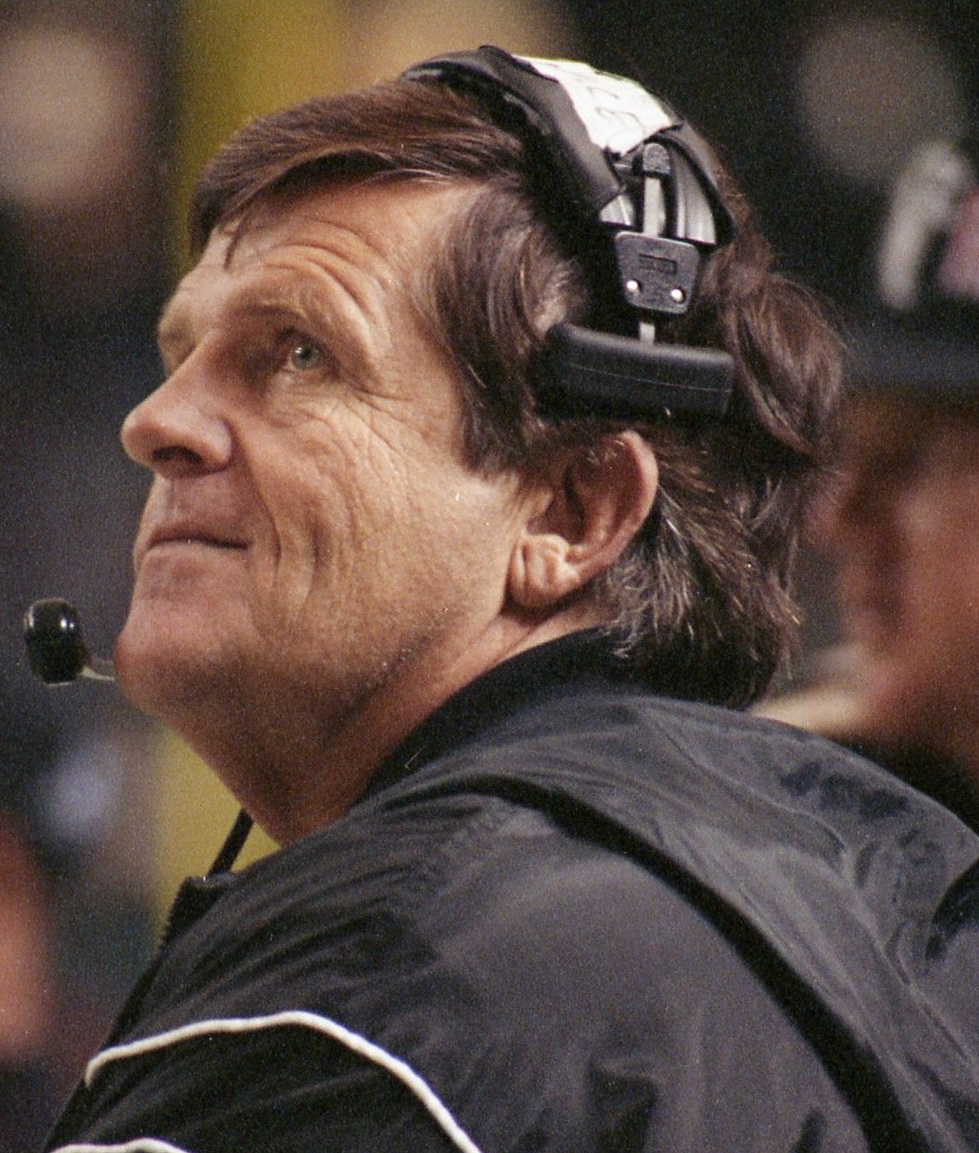
Jerry Glanville served as the Vikings' head coach for the 2007, 2008 and 2009 seasons.

Portland State Vikings football under Jerry Glanville encompassed the 2007, 2008 and 2009 NCAA Division I FCS football seasons that Glanville served as the head coach. On February 28, 2007, Glanville was hired as the twelfth head coach in the history of Portland State football. He replaced Tim Walsh who resigned as head coach on February 16 to accept the position of offensive coordinator at Army. Prior to his arrival, Glanville had served as defensive coordinator at Hawaii for both the 2005 and 2006 seasons. He had also served as the head coach for both the Houston Oilers (from 1986 to 1989) and the Atlanta Falcons (from 1990 to 1993) of the National Football League prior to his arrival at Portland.

The Vikings entered the 2007 season with high expectations, but finished with only three wins and eight losses (3–8). Their loss against Weber State was noted for having set Football Championship Subdivision (FCS) records for both the most combined points and points scored by a team in a loss. Looking to improve in 2008, the Vikings only won one additional game to finish with four wins and seven losses (4–7). After finishing the 2009 season with only two wins and nine losses (2–9), Glanville resigned as head coach of the Vikings on November 17. During his three-season tenure at Portland State, Glanville compiled an overall record of nine wins and 24 losses (9–24).

== 2007 season ==
2007 Portland State Vikings football
- Conference: Big Sky Conference
- Record: 3–8 (3–5 Big Sky)
- Head coach: Jerry Glanville (1st season)
- Offensive coordinator: Mouse Davis (1st season)
- Offensive scheme: Run and shoot
- Base defense: 3–4
- Home stadium: PGE Park

2007 Big Sky Conference football standings
	Conf.			Overall
Team	W		L	W		L
No. 10 Montana $^	8	–	0	11	–	1
No. 8 Eastern Washington ^	6	–	2	9	–	4
Northern Arizona	5	–	3	6	–	5
Montana State	4	–	4	6	–	5
Weber State	4	–	4	5	–	6
Portland State	3	–	5	3	–	8
Sacramento State	3	–	5	3	–	8
Idaho State	2	–	6	3	–	8
Northern Colorado	1	–	7	1	–	11
$ – Conference champion; ^ – FCS playoff participant; Rankings from The Sports Network poll

As the 2007 squad entered the season, Nike released new team uniforms and stylized Viking logo. Although the team entered the season as the No. 13 ranked team in the FCS and the favorite to finish second behind Montana in the Big Sky, the team struggled and finished with a record of three wins and eight losses. After losses against No. 10 McNeese State to open the season, and UC Davis in their home opener, the first victory of the Glanville era came against Sacramento State at PGE Park. Portland then lost at San Diego State of the Football Bowl Subdivision a week before their second victory of the season at No. 21 Eastern Washington.

The Vikings then lost their next five consecutive games against Northern Arizona, Idaho State, Weber State, Montana and Montana State. Their 68–73 loss against Weber State is noted for the combined 141 points scored by both teams and 68 points scored by the Vikings in the loss, both FCS records. At the time, the 141 combined points also set the NCAA all-division record for most points in a game. Portland then closed the season with a victory at Northern Colorado to end their five-game losing streak.

=== Schedule ===
Date	Opponent	Rank	Site	Result	Attendance	Source
September 1	at No. 10 McNeese State*	No. 13	Cowboy Stadium; Lake Charles, LA	L 12–35	13,498	
September 8	UC Davis*	No. 18	PGE Park; Portland, OR	L 17–26	12,022	
September 15	Sacramento State		PGE Park; Portland, OR	W 35–24	8,385	
September 22	at San Diego State*		Qualcomm Stadium; San Diego, CA	L 17–52	53,110	
September 29	at No. 21 Eastern Washington		Woodward Field; Cheney, WA (rivalry)	W 28–21	6,231	
October 6	Northern Arizona		PGE Park; Portland, OR	L 43–44	9,291	
October 20	at Idaho State		Holt Arena; Pocatello, ID	L 20–38	5,925	
October 27	Weber State		PGE Park; Portland, OR	L 68–73	8,924	
November 3	at No. 4 Montana		Washington–Grizzly Stadium; Missoula, MT	L 31–34	23,446	
November 10	Montana State		PGE Park; Portland, OR	L 36–50	11,786	
November 17	at Northern Colorado		Nottingham Field; Greeley, CO	W 31–21	2,837	
*Non-conference game; Rankings from The Sports Network Poll released prior to the game

== 2008 season ==
2008 Portland State Vikings football
- Conference: Big Sky Conference
- Record: 4–7 (3–5 Big Sky)
- Head coach: Jerry Glanville (2nd season)
- Offensive coordinator: Mouse Davis (2nd season)
- Offensive scheme: Run and shoot
- Base defense: 3–4
- Home stadium: PGE Park

2008 Big Sky Conference football standings
	Conf.			Overall
Team	W		L	W		L
No. 2 Montana $^	7	–	1	14	–	2
No. 7 Weber State $^	7	–	1	10	–	4
Montana State	5	–	3	7	–	5
Eastern Washington	5	–	3	6	–	5
Northern Arizona	4	–	4	6	–	5
Sacramento State	3	–	5	6	–	6
Portland State	3	–	5	4	–	7
Northern Colorado	1	–	7	1	–	10
Idaho State	1	–	7	1	–	11
$ – Conference champion; ^ – FCS playoff participant; Rankings from The Sports Network poll

Looking to improve upon their three win 2007 season, Glanville led the Vikings to only an improvement of a single win in their 4–7 2008 campaign. After a victory over Division II Western Oregon to open the season, Portland lost three consecutive road games against UC Davis, Washington State of the FBS and Sacramento State. The Vikings ended their three-game losing streak with a 47–36 victory over Eastern Washington. In the win, Portland quarterback set a FCS record for having the most pass attempts in a single game without an interception with 73.

The Vikings then lost at Northern Arizona and defeated Idaho State at PGE Park to improve their record to 3–4. However, Portland then had their second three-game losing streak of the season with losses at Weber State, at home against Montana and at home against Montana State before they won their final game of the season at home against Northern Colorado.

=== Schedule ===
Date	Opponent	Site	Result	Attendance	Source
August 30	Western Oregon*	PGE Park; Portland, OR	W 31–14	8,239	
September 13	at UC Davis*	Aggie Stadium; Davis, CA	L 24–38	8,107	
September 20	at Washington State*	Martin Stadium; Pullman, WA	L 9–48	23,920	
September 27	at Sacramento State	Hornet Stadium; Sacramento, CA	L 31–41	8,437	
October 4	No. 11 Eastern Washington	PGE Park; Portland, OR (rivalry)	W 47–36	7,092	
October 11	at No. 18 Northern Arizona	Walkup Skydome; Flagstaff, AZ	L 17–37	5,836	
October 25	Idaho State	PGE Park; Portland, OR	W 36–13	7,330	
November 1	at No. 13 Weber State	Stewart Stadium; Ogden, UT	L 21–31	8,164	
November 8	No. 5 Montana	PGE Park; Portland, OR	L 12–29	12,071	
November 15	at Montana State	Bobcat Stadium; Bozeman, MT	L 32–49	12,478	
November 22	Northern Colorado	PGE Park; Portland, OR	W 24–21	5,143	
*Non-conference game; Rankings from The Sports Network Poll released prior to the game

== 2009 season ==
2009 Portland State Vikings football
- Conference: Big Sky Conference
- Record: 2–9 (1–7 Big Sky)
- Head coach: Jerry Glanville (3rd season)
- Offensive coordinator: Jim Craft (1st season)
- Offensive scheme: West Coast
- Base defense: 3–4
- Home stadium: PGE Park

2009 Big Sky Conference football standings
	Conf.			Overall
Team	W		L	W		L
No. 2 Montana $^	8	–	0	14	–	1
No. 13 Eastern Washington ^	6	–	2	8	–	4
No. 17 Weber State ^	6	–	2	7	–	5
Montana State	5	–	3	7	–	4
Northern Arizona	4	–	4	5	–	6
Sacramento State	4	–	4	5	–	6
Northern Colorado	1	–	7	3	–	8
Portland State	1	–	7	2	–	9
Idaho State	1	–	7	1	–	10
$ – Conference champion; ^ – FCS playoff participant; Rankings from The Sports Network poll

In what was the final season of the Glanville era, Portland State only won a pair of games en route to a final record of two wins and nine losses. After a loss at Oregon State to open the season, the Vikings won their first game of the season at home against Southern Oregon of the NAIA. The Vikings then went on a three-game losing streak with losses at Montana, and against both Weber State and Sacramento State before they won their second and final game of the season at Northern Colorado. Portland State then concluded the season with five consecutive losses against Northern Arizona, UC Davis, at Seattle against Eastern Washington, against Montana State and at Idaho State.

=== Schedule ===
Date	Opponent	Site	Result	Attendance
September 5	at Oregon State*	Reser Stadium; Corvallis, OR	L 7–34	41,679
September 12	Southern Oregon*	PGE Park; Portland, OR	W 34–10	13,498
September 19	at No. 4 Montana	Washington–Grizzly Stadium; Missoula, MT	L 17–49	25,726
September 26	No. 11 Weber State	PGE Park; Portland, OR	L 29–36	6,659
October 3	Sacramento State	PGE Park; Portland, OR	L 14–31	5,037
October 10	at Northern Colorado	Nottingham Field; Greeley, CO	W 23–18	3,518
October 17	Northern Arizona	PGE Park; Portland, OR	L 23–44	6,489
October 24	UC Davis*	PGE Park; Portland, OR	L 31–34	5,180
October 31	vs. Eastern Washington	Qwest Field; Seattle, WA (Showdown on the Sound, The Dam Cup)	L 10–47	6,124
November 7	Montana State	PGE Park; Portland, OR	L 10–28	5,690
November 14	at Idaho State	Holt Arena; Pocatello, ID	L 34–41	5,019
*Non-conference game; Rankings from The Sports Network Poll released prior to the game
