= 2007 Monmouth Hawks football team =

American college football season

2007 Monmouth Hawks football
- Conference: Northeast Conference
- Record: 4–6 (3–3 NEC)
- Head coach: Kevin Callahan (15th season)
- Offensive coordinator: Mark Fabish (6th season)
- Offensive scheme: Pro-style
- Defensive coordinator: Andy Bobik (14th season)
- Base defense: 4–3
- Home stadium: Kessler Field

2007 Northeast Conference football standings
	Conf.			Overall
Team	W		L	W		L
Albany $	6	–	0	8	–	4
Central Connecticut State	4	–	2	6	–	5
Wagner	3	–	3	7	–	4
Monmouth	3	–	3	4	–	6
Robert Morris	3	–	3	4	–	6
Saint Francis (PA)	2	–	4	3	–	7
Sacred Heart	0	–	6	3	–	8
$ – Conference champion

The 2007 Monmouth Hawks football team represented Monmouth University in the 2007 NCAA Division I FCS football season as a member of the Northeast Conference (NEC). The Hawks were led by 15th-year head coach Kevin Callahan and played their home games at Kessler Field. They finished the season 4–6 overall and 3–3 in NEC play to place in a three-way tie for third.

== Schedule ==
Date	Time	Opponent	Site	Result	Attendance	Source
September 1	6:00 p.m.	at Maine*	Alfond Stadium; Orono, ME	L 14–21	7,312	
September 8	1:00 p.m.	Robert Morris	Kessler Field; West Long Branch, NJ	L 17–20	2,837	
September 22	6:00 p.m.	at Stony Brook*	Kenneth P. LaValle Stadium; Stony Brook, NY	L 15–21	4,381	
September 29	7:00 p.m.	at No. 12 Delaware*	Delaware Stadium; Newark, DE	L 7–42	21,431	
October 6	1:00 p.m.	at Sacred Heart	Campus Field; Fairfield, CT	W 49–8	1,274	
October 13	1:00 p.m.	Wagner	Kessler Field; West Long Branch, NJ	L 16–45	3,954	
October 27	11:00 a.m.	at Central Connecticut State	Arute Field; New Britain, CT	W 51–36	1,359	
November 3	1:00 p.m.	at Saint Francis (PA)	DeGol Field; Loretto, PA	W 47–17	2,031	
November 10	1:00 p.m.	Albany	Kessler Field; West Long Branch, NJ	L 3–21	3,223	
November 17	12:00 p.m.	Duquesne	Kessler Field; West Long Branch, NJ	W 31–20	2,812	
*Non-conference game; Rankings from The Sports Network Poll released prior to the game; All times are in Eastern time
