= 2007 Eastern Washington Eagles football team =

American college football season

2007 Eastern Washington Eagles football

NCAA Division I-AA Quarterfinal, L 35–38 at Appalachian State
- Conference: Big Sky Conference

Ranking
- Sports Network: No. 8
- Record: 9–4 (6–2 Big Sky)
- Head coach: Paul Wulff (8th season)
- Offensive coordinator: Todd Sturdy (1st season)
- Defensive coordinator: Jody Sears (5th season)
- Home stadium: Woodward Field

2007 Big Sky Conference football standings
| | Conf. | | | Overall |
| Team | W | | L | W | | L |
|---|---|---|---|---|---|---|
| No. 10 Montana $^ | 8 | – | 0 | 11 | – | 1 |
| No. 8 Eastern Washington ^ | 6 | – | 2 | 9 | – | 4 |
| Northern Arizona | 5 | – | 3 | 6 | – | 5 |
| Montana State | 4 | – | 4 | 6 | – | 5 |
| Weber State | 4 | – | 4 | 5 | – | 6 |
| Portland State | 3 | – | 5 | 3 | – | 8 |
| Sacramento State | 3 | – | 5 | 3 | – | 8 |
| Idaho State | 2 | – | 6 | 3 | – | 8 |
| Northern Colorado | 1 | – | 7 | 1 | – | 11 |
$ – Conference champion; ^ – FCS playoff participant; Rankings from The Sports Network poll

The 2007 Eastern Washington Eagles football team represented Eastern Washington University as a member of the Big Sky Conference during the 2007 NCAA Division I FCS football season. Led by eighth-year head coach Paul Wulff, the Eagles compiled an overall record of 9–4, with a mark of 6–2 in conference play, and finished second in the Big Sky. Eastern Washington advanced to the NCAA Division I-AA Football Championship playoffs, where the Eagles defeated McNeese State in the first round and lost to Appalachian State in the quarterfinal. The team played home games at Woodward Field in Cheney, Washington.

== Schedule ==
| Date | Opponent | Rank | Site | Result | Attendance | Source |
|---|---|---|---|---|---|---|
| August 31 | Montana Western* | | Woodward Field; Cheney, WA | W 52–13 | | |
| September 15 | UC Davis* | | Woodward Field; Cheney, WA | W 41–31 | 4,138 | |
| September 22 | at Idaho State | No. 25 | Holt Arena; Pocatello, ID | W 34–7 | 6,620 | |
| September 29 | Portland State | No. 21 | Woodward Field; Cheney, WA (rivalry) | L 21–28 | 6,231 | |
| October 6 | at No. 1 Montana | | Washington–Grizzly Stadium; Missoula, MT (EWU–UM Governors Cup) | L 23–24 | 23,226 | |
| October 13 | No. 11 Montana State | | Woodward Field; Cheney, WA | W 35–13 | 7,326 | |
| October 20 | at BYU* | No. 22 | LaVell Edwards Stadium; Provo, UT | L 7–42 | 64,522 | |
| October 27 | at Sacramento State | | Hornet Stadium; Sacramento, CA | W 38–30 | 4,706 | |
| November 3 | Northern Colorado | No. 24 | Woodward Field; Cheney, WA | W 17–7 | 5,215 | |
| November 10 | at Northern Arizona | No. 20 | Walkup Skydome; Flagstaff, AZ | W 52–24 | 4,166 | |
| November 17 | Weber State | No. 15 | Woodward Field; Cheney, WA | W 38–16 | 4,181 | |
| November 24 | at No. 3 McNeese State* | No. 14 | Cowboy Stadium; Lake Charles, LA (NCAA Division I First Round) | W 44–15 | 9,213 | |
| December 1 | at No. 5 Appalachian State* | No. 14 | Kidd Brewer Stadium; Boone, NC (NCAA Division I Quarterfinal) | L 35–38 | 16,947 | |
*Non-conference game; Rankings from The Sports Network Poll released prior to the game
