= 2007 Samford Bulldogs football team =

American college football season

2007 Samford Bulldogs football
- Conference: Ohio Valley Conference
- Record: 4–7 (2–6 OVC)
- Head coach: Pat Sullivan (1st season)
- Offensive coordinator: Steve Brickey (1st season)
- Defensive coordinator: Bill D'Ottavio (1st season)
- Home stadium: Seibert Stadium

2007 Ohio Valley Conference football standings
	Conf.			Overall
Team	W		L	W		L
No. 13 Eastern Kentucky $^	8	–	0	9	–	3
No. 18 Eastern Illinois ^	7	–	1	8	–	4
Austin Peay	5	–	3	7	–	4
Jacksonville State	5	–	3	6	–	5
Tennessee State	4	–	3	5	–	6
Tennessee–Martin	4	–	4	4	–	7
Samford	2	–	6	4	–	7
Tennessee Tech	2	–	6	4	–	7
Southeast Missouri State	1	–	6	3	–	8
Murray State	1	–	7	2	–	9
$ – Conference champion; ^ – FCS playoff participant; Rankings from The Sports Network poll

The 2007 Samford Bulldogs football team represented Samford University as a member of the Ohio Valley Conference (OVC) during the 2007 NCAA Division I FCS football season. Led by first-year head coach Pat Sullivan, the Bulldogs compiled an overall record of 4–7, with a mark of 2–6 in conference play, and finished tied for seventh in the OVC. The team played home games at Seibert Stadium in Homewood, Alabama.

== Schedule ==
Date	Time	Opponent	Site	TV	Result	Attendance	Source
August 30	7:00 p.m.	West Alabama*	Seibert Stadium; Homewood, AL		W 23–21	10,483	
September 8	12:30 p.m.	at No. 21 (FBS) Georgia Tech*	Bobby Dodd Stadium; Atlanta, GA	ESPNU	L 14–69	43,288	
September 13	7:00 p.m.	Presbyterian*	Seibert Stadium; Homewood, AL		W 34–24	2,575	
September 22	6:00 p.m.	Southeast Missouri State	Seibert Stadium; Homewood, AL		W 26–21	5,230	
September 29	2:00 p.m.	at Eastern Kentucky	Roy Kidd Stadium; Richmond, KY		L 20–43	10,100	
October 13	2:00 p.m.	at Tennessee–Martin	Graham Stadium; Martin, TN		L 21–31	6,167	
October 20	2:00 p.m.	Austin Peay^{†}	Seibert Stadium; Homewood, AL		L 25–28	5,830	
October 27	1:30 p.m.	at Tennessee Tech	Tucker Stadium; Cookeville, TN		W 59–52	4,253	
November 3	1:00 p.m.	Jacksonville State	Seibert Stadium; Homewood, AL (rivalry)		L 12–24	6,273	
November 8	5:00 p.m.	Tennessee State	Seibert Stadium; Homewood, AL		L 28–38	4,193	
November 17	1:30 p.m.	at No. 21 Eastern Illinois	O'Brien Field; Charleston, IL		L 17–33	3,083	
*Non-conference game; ^{†}Homecoming; Rankings from The Sports Network Poll released prior to the game; All times are in Central time
