= 2007 Jacksonville Dolphins football team =

American college football team

2007 Jacksonville Dolphins football
- Conference: Pioneer Football League
- Record: 3–8 (2–5 PFL)
- Head coach: Kerwin Bell (1st season)
- Home stadium: D. B. Milne Field

2007 Pioneer Football League standings
	Conf.			Overall
Team	W		L	W		L
Dayton +	6	–	1	11	–	1
San Diego +	6	–	1	9	–	2
Morehead State	5	–	2	7	–	4
Davidson	4	–	3	6	–	4
Drake	3	–	4	6	–	5
Valparaiso	2	–	5	5	–	6
Jacksonville	2	–	5	3	–	8
Butler	0	–	7	4	–	7
+ – Conference co-champions

The 2007 Jacksonville Dolphins football team represented Jacksonville University as a member of the South Division of the Pioneer Football League (PFL) during the 2007 NCAA Division I FCS football season. Led by first-year head coach Kerwin Bell, the Dolphins compiled an overall record of 3–8 with a mark of 2–5 conference play, and tied for sixth in the PFL. Jacksonville played home games at D. B. Milne Field in Jacksonville, Florida.

== Schedule ==
Date	Time	Opponent	Site	Result	Attendance	Source
September 1		at Bethune–Cookman*	Municipal Stadium; Daytona Beach, FL	L 17–31	7,845	
September 8	6:00 p.m.	at Gardner–Webb*	Ernest W. Spangler Stadium; Boiling Springs, NC	L 6–27	3,350	
September 22		UNC Pembroke*	D. B. Milne Field; Jacksonville, FL	W 55–10	1,873	
September 29	12:00 p.m.	Davidson	D. B. Milne Field; Jacksonville, FL	L 10–20	2,140	
October 6		at Dayton	Welcome Stadium; Dayton, OH	L 3–49	5,034	
October 13		Morehead State	D. B. Milne Field; Jacksonville, FL	W 34–24	2,367	
October 20	9:00 p.m.	at No. 20 San Diego	Torero Stadium; San Diego, CA	L 23–62	3,544	
October 27		at Drake	Drake Stadium; Des Moines, IA	L 14–42	2,731	
November 3		Valparaiso	D. B. Milne Field; Jacksonville, FL	L 27–29	1,704	
November 10	12:00 p.m.	Butler	D. B. Milne Field; Jacksonville, FL	W 24–16	2,145	
November 17	12:00 p.m.	Wagner*	D. B. Milne Field; Jacksonville, FL	L 27–41	2,283	
*Non-conference game; Rankings from The Sports Network Poll released prior to the game; All times are in Eastern time
