= 2007 Idaho State Bengals football team =

American college football season

2007 Idaho State Bengals football
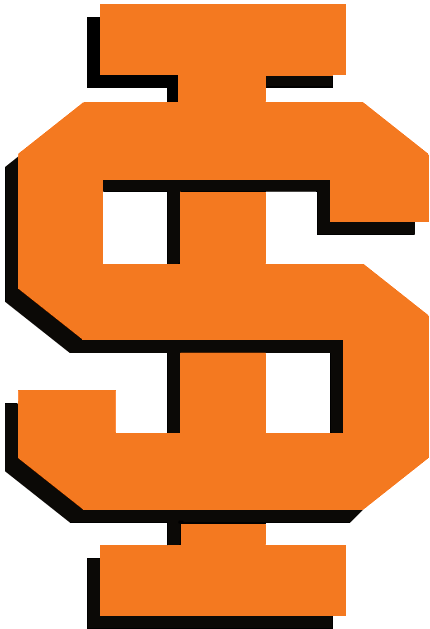
- Conference: Big Sky Conference
- Record: 3–8 (2–6 Big Sky)
- Head coach: John Zamberlin (1st season)
- Offensive coordinator: Mike Orthmann (1st season)
- Offensive scheme: Pro-style
- Defensive coordinator: Brian Strandley (1st season)
- Base defense: 3–4
- Home stadium: Holt Arena

2007 Big Sky Conference football standings
	Conf.			Overall
Team	W		L	W		L
No. 10 Montana $^	8	–	0	11	–	1
No. 8 Eastern Washington ^	6	–	2	9	–	4
Northern Arizona	5	–	3	6	–	5
Montana State	4	–	4	6	–	5
Weber State	4	–	4	5	–	6
Portland State	3	–	5	3	–	8
Sacramento State	3	–	5	3	–	8
Idaho State	2	–	6	3	–	8
Northern Colorado	1	–	7	1	–	11
$ – Conference champion; ^ – FCS playoff participant; Rankings from The Sports Network poll

The 2007 Idaho State Bengals football team represented Idaho State University as a member of the Big Sky Conference during the 2007 NCAA Division I FCS football season. Led by first-year head coach John Zamberlin, the Bengals compiled an overall record of 3–8 with a mark of 2–6 in conference play, placing eighth in the Big Sky. Idaho State played home games at Holt Arena in Pocatello, Idaho.

== Schedule ==
Date	Time	Opponent	Site	TV	Result	Attendance	Source
September 8	3:05 pm	Southern Oregon*	Holt Arena; Pocatello, ID		W 37–11	6,036	
September 15	4:35 pm	at Oregon State*	Reser Stadium; Corvallis, OR	FSNNW	L 10–61	38,491	
September 22	3:05 pm	No. 25 Eastern Washington	Holt Arena; Pocatello, ID		L 7–34	6,620	
September 29	1:35 pm	at No. 18 Montana State	Bobcat Stadium; Bozeman, MT		L 20–40	14,427	
October 6	3:05 pm	Northern Colorado^{†}	Holt Arena; Pocatello, ID		W 26–14	7,639	
October 13	4:05 pm	at Northern Arizona	Walkup Skydome; Flagstaff, AZ		L 24–45	9,831	
October 20	3:05 pm	Portland State	Holt Arena; Pocatello, ID		W 38–20	5,925	
October 27	3:05 pm	Cal Poly*	Holt Arena; Pocatello, ID		L 28–48	6,037	
November 3	1:35 pm	at Weber State	Stewart Stadium; Ogden, UT		L 37–52	3,689	
November 10	3:05 pm	No. 3 Montana	Holt Arena; Pocatello, ID	KPAX	L 14–27	8,645	
November 17	3:05 pm	at Sacramento State	Hornet Stadium; Sacramento, CA		L 30–41	5,489	
*Non-conference game; ^{†}Homecoming; Rankings from The Sports Network Poll released prior to the game; All times are in Mountain time
