= 2007 Tennessee State Tigers football team =

American college football season

2007 Tennessee State Tigers football
- Conference: Ohio Valley Conference
- Record: 5–6 (4–3 OVC)
- Head coach: James Webster (3rd season)
- Offensive coordinator: Fred Kaiss (2nd season)
- Home stadium: LP Field

2007 Ohio Valley Conference football standings
	Conf.			Overall
Team	W		L	W		L
No. 13 Eastern Kentucky $^	8	–	0	9	–	3
No. 18 Eastern Illinois ^	7	–	1	8	–	4
Austin Peay	5	–	3	7	–	4
Jacksonville State	5	–	3	6	–	5
Tennessee State	4	–	3	5	–	6
Tennessee–Martin	4	–	4	4	–	7
Samford	2	–	6	4	–	7
Tennessee Tech	2	–	6	4	–	7
Southeast Missouri State	1	–	6	3	–	8
Murray State	1	–	7	2	–	9
$ – Conference champion; ^ – FCS playoff participant; Rankings from The Sports Network poll

The 2007 Tennessee State Tigers football team represented Tennessee State University as a member of the Ohio Valley Conference (OVC) during the 2007 NCAA Division I FCS football season. Led by third-year head coach James Webster, the Tigers compiled an overall record of 5–6, with a conference record of 4–3, and finished fifth in the OVC.

== Schedule ==
Date	Opponent	Site	Result	Attendance	Source
September 1	Alabama A&M*	LP Field; Nashville, TN (John Merritt Classic)	L 23–49	23,440	
September 8	vs. Jackson State*	Liberty Bowl Memorial Stadium; Memphis, TN (Southern Heritage Classic)	W 16–13		
September 15	at Austin Peay	Governors Stadium; Clarksville, TN	W 33–32 ^{OT}		
September 22	at Southern*	A. W. Mumford Stadium; Baton Rouge, LA	L 34–41	15,371	
September 29	vs. Florida A&M*	Georgia Dome; Atlanta, GA (Atlanta Football Classic)	L 17–18	56,990	
October 11	at Tennessee Tech	Tucker Stadium; Cookeville, TN	W 45–28	9,369	
October 20	at Eastern Kentucky	Roy Kidd Stadium; Richmond, KY	L 7–49	11,500	
October 27	Eastern Illinois	LP Field; Nashville, TN	L 35–38	8,935	
November 3	Murray State	LP Field; Nashville, TN	W 42–28	24,878	
November 8	at Samford	Seibert Stadium; Homewood, AL	W 38–28	4,193	
November 17	Tennessee–Martin	LP Field; Nashville, TN	L 38–43		
*Non-conference game
