= 2007 Northern Colorado Bears football team =

American college football season

2007 Northern Colorado Bears football
- Conference: Big Sky Conference
- Record: 1–11 (1–7 Big Sky)
- Head coach: Scott Downing (2nd season)
- Home stadium: Nottingham Field

2007 Big Sky Conference football standings
	Conf.			Overall
Team	W		L	W		L
No. 10 Montana $^	8	–	0	11	–	1
No. 8 Eastern Washington ^	6	–	2	9	–	4
Northern Arizona	5	–	3	6	–	5
Montana State	4	–	4	6	–	5
Weber State	4	–	4	5	–	6
Portland State	3	–	5	3	–	8
Sacramento State	3	–	5	3	–	8
Idaho State	2	–	6	3	–	8
Northern Colorado	1	–	7	1	–	11
$ – Conference champion; ^ – FCS playoff participant; Rankings from The Sports Network poll

The 2007 Northern Colorado Bears football team represented the University of Northern Colorado as a member of the Big Sky Conference during the 2007 NCAA Division I FCS football season. Led by second-year head coach Scott Downing, the Bears compiled an overall record of 1–11, with a mark of 1–7 in conference play, and finished ninth in the Big Sky. The team played home games at Nottingham Field in Greeley, Colorado.

== Schedule ==
Date	Opponent	Site	Result	Attendance	Source
September 1	at No. 23 (FBS) Hawaii*	Aloha Stadium; Halawa, HI	L 6–63	36,845	
September 8	No. 6 (D-II) Chadron State*	Nottingham Field; Greeley, CO	L 0–31	6,684	
September 15	at San Diego*	Torero Stadium; San Diego, CA	L 13–49		
September 22	at Northern Arizona	Walkup Skydome; Flagstaff, AZ	L 14–34		
September 29	at Cal Poly*	Alex G. Spanos Stadium; San Luis Obispo, CA	L 21–56	9,684	
October 6	at Idaho State	Holt Arena; Pocatello, ID	L 14–26	7,639	
October 13	Weber State	Nottingham Field; Greeley, CO	L 0–23	5,276	
October 20	at No. 3 Montana	Washington–Grizzly Stadium; Missoula, MT	L 7–52	23,134	
October 27	No. 19 Montana State	Nottingham Field; Greeley, CO	W 16–13	3,033	
November 3	at No. 24 Eastern Washington	Woodward Field; Cheney, WA	L 7–17	5,215	
November 10	Sacramento State	Nottingham Field; Greeley, CO	L 17–20	2,609	
November 17	Portland State	Nottingham Field; Greeley, CO	L 21–31	2,837	
*Non-conference game; Rankings from The Sports Network Poll released prior to the game
