= 2007 Sacramento State Hornets football team =

American college football season

2007 Sacramento State Hornets football
- Conference: Big Sky Conference
- Record: 3–8 (3–5 Big Sky)
- Head coach: Marshall Sperbeck (1st season)
- Home stadium: Hornet Stadium

2007 Big Sky Conference football standings
	Conf.			Overall
Team	W		L	W		L
No. 10 Montana $^	8	–	0	11	–	1
No. 8 Eastern Washington ^	6	–	2	9	–	4
Northern Arizona	5	–	3	6	–	5
Montana State	4	–	4	6	–	5
Weber State	4	–	4	5	–	6
Portland State	3	–	5	3	–	8
Sacramento State	3	–	5	3	–	8
Idaho State	2	–	6	3	–	8
Northern Colorado	1	–	7	1	–	11
$ – Conference champion; ^ – FCS playoff participant; Rankings from The Sports Network poll

The 2007 Sacramento State Hornets football team represented California State University, Sacramento as a member of the Big Sky Conference during the 2007 NCAA Division I FCS football season. Led by first-year head coach Marshall Sperbeck, Sacramento State compiled an overall record of 3–8 with a mark of 3–5 in conference play, tying for sixth place in the Big Sky. The team was outscored by its opponents 305 to 201 for the season. The Hornets played home games at Hornet Stadium in Sacramento, California.

== Schedule ==
Date	Opponent	Site	Result	Attendance	Source
September 1	at Fresno State*	Bulldog Stadium; Fresno, CA	L 3–24	35,963	
September 15	at Portland State*	PGE Park; Portland, OR	L 24–35	8,385	
September 22	at New Mexico	University Stadium; Albuquerque, NM	L 0–58	27,023	
September 29	Northern Arizona	Hornet Stadium; Sacramento, CA	W 38–9	6,194	
October 6	at Weber State	Stewart Stadium; Ogden, UT	L 7–26	3,342	
October 13	No. 1 Montana	Hornet Stadium; Sacramento, CA	L 3–17	10,034	
October 20	at No. 20 Montana State	Bobcat Stadium; Bozeman, MT	L 9–20	14,167	
October 27	Eastern Washington	Hornet Stadium; Sacramento, CA	L 30–38	4,706	
November 3	UC Davis*	Hornet Stadium; Sacramento, CA (Causeway Classic)	L 26–31	13,073	
November 10	at Northern Colorado	Nottingham Field; Greeley, CO	W 20–17	2,609	
November 17	Idaho State	Hornet Stadium; Sacramento, CA	W 41–30	5,489	
*Non-conference game; Rankings from The Sports Network Poll released prior to the game
