= 2007 Weber State Wildcats football team =

American college football season

2007 Weber State Wildcats football
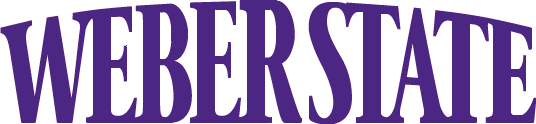
- Conference: Big Sky Conference
- Record: 5–6 (4–4 Big Sky)
- Head coach: Ron McBride (3rd season)
- Offensive coordinator: Matt Hammer (1st season)
- Home stadium: Stewart Stadium

2007 Big Sky Conference football standings
| | Conf. | | | Overall |
| Team | W | | L | W | | L |
|---|---|---|---|---|---|---|
| No. 10 Montana $^ | 8 | – | 0 | 11 | – | 1 |
| No. 8 Eastern Washington ^ | 6 | – | 2 | 9 | – | 4 |
| Northern Arizona | 5 | – | 3 | 6 | – | 5 |
| Montana State | 4 | – | 4 | 6 | – | 5 |
| Weber State | 4 | – | 4 | 5 | – | 6 |
| Portland State | 3 | – | 5 | 3 | – | 8 |
| Sacramento State | 3 | – | 5 | 3 | – | 8 |
| Idaho State | 2 | – | 6 | 3 | – | 8 |
| Northern Colorado | 1 | – | 7 | 1 | – | 11 |
$ – Conference champion; ^ – FCS playoff participant; Rankings from The Sports Network poll

The 2007 Weber State Wildcats football team represented Weber State University as a member of the Big Sky Conference during the 2007 NCAA Division I FCS football season. Led by third-year head coach Ron McBride, the Wildcats compiled an overall record of 5–6 with a mark of 4–4 in conference play to finish in a tie for 4th place.

== Schedule ==
| Date | Time | Opponent | Site | TV | Result | Attendance | Source |
|---|---|---|---|---|---|---|---|
| August 30 | 7:00 pm | at No. 24 (FBS) Boise State* | Bronco Stadium; Boise, ID | KTVB | L 7–56 | 30,278 | |
| September 15 | 7:00 pm | at Cal Poly* | Alex G. Spanos Stadium; San Luis Obispo, CA | | L 19–47 | 11,075 | |
| September 22 | 1:30 pm | No. 18 Montana State | Stewart Stadium; Ogden, UT | | L 5–21 | 6,782 | |
| September 29 | 1:00 pm | at No. 1 Montana | Washington–Grizzly Stadium; Missoula, MT | KPAX | L 10–18 | 23,267 | |
| October 6 | 1:00 pm | Sacramento State | Stewart Stadium; Ogden, UT | | W 26–7 | 3,342 | |
| October 13 | 12:00 pm | at Northern Colorado | Nottingham Field; Greeley, CO | | W 23–0 | 5,276 | |
| October 20 | 1:00 pm | Northern Arizona | Stewart Stadium; Ogden, UT | | L 20–29 | 3,492 | |
| October 27 | 3:30 pm | at Portland State | PGE Park; Portland, OR | | W 73–68 | 8,924 | |
| November 3 | 1:30 pm | Idaho State | Stewart Stadium; Ogden, UT | | W 52–37 | 3,689 | |
| November 10 | 1:00 pm | Fort Lewis* | Stewart Stadium; Ogden, UT | | W 48–3 | 3,155 | |
| November 17 | 3:00 pm | at No. 15 Eastern Washington | Woodward Field; Cheney, WA | | L 16–38 | 4,181 | |
*Non-conference game; Rankings from The Sports Network Poll released prior to the game; All times are in Mountain time
