= 2007 Stony Brook Seawolves football team =

American college football season

2007 Stony Brook Seawolves football
- Conference: Independent
- Record: 6–5
- Head coach: Chuck Priore (2nd season)
- Offensive coordinator: Jeff Behrman (2nd season)
- Home stadium: Kenneth P. LaValle Stadium

2007 NCAA Division I FCS independents football standings
| | Conf. | | | Overall |
| Team | W | | L | W | | L |
|---|---|---|---|---|---|---|
| Western Kentucky | | – | | 7 | – | 5 |
| Stony Brook | | – | | 6 | – | 5 |
| Presbyterian | | – | | 6 | – | 5 |
| Savannah State | | – | | 1 | – | 9 |

The 2007 Stony Brook Seawolves football team represented Stony Brook University as an independent during the 2007 NCAA Division I FCS football season. Led by second-year head coach Chuck Priore, the Seawolves compiled a record of 6–5. Stony Brook played home games at Kenneth P. LaValle Stadium in Stony Brook, New York.

== Schedule ==
| Date | Time | Opponent | Site | Result | Attendance | Source |
|---|---|---|---|---|---|---|
| September 1 | 6:00 pm | Georgetown | Kenneth P. LaValle Stadium; Stony Brook, NY | W 35–28 | 7,228 | |
| September 8 | 6:00 pm | at Bucknell | Christy Mathewson–Memorial Stadium; Lewisburg, PA | W 48–20 | 5,143 | |
| September 15 | 4:00 pm | at No. 6 Youngstown State | Stambaugh Stadium; Youngstown, OH | L 42–6 | 14,390 | |
| September 22 | 6:00 pm | Monmouth | Kenneth P. LaValle Stadium; Stony Brook, NY (Downey Classic) | W 21–15 | 4,381 | |
| September 29 | 7:00 pm | at No. 14 Hofstra | James M. Shuart Stadium; Hempstead, NY (Battle of Long Island) | L 33–28 | 5,527 | |
| October 6 | 4:00 pm | at Albany | University Field; Albany, NY (rivalry) | L 24–23 | 1,740 | |
| October 13 | 3:30 pm | at No. 20 Richmond | UR Stadium; Richmond, VA | L 42–0 | 5,150 | |
| October 20 | 3:00 pm | Maine^{†} | Kenneth P. LaValle Stadium; Stony Brook, NY | W 30–23 ^{2OT} | 7,328 | |
| October 27 | 4:00 pm | Bryant | Kenneth P. LaValle Stadium; Stony Brook, NY | W 30–0 | 2,238 | |
| November 10 | 1:00 pm | Central Connecticut State | Kenneth P. LaValle Stadium; Stony Brook, NY | W 34–7 | 1,832 | |
| November 17 | 3:30 pm | at No. 24 Elon | Rhodes Stadium; Elon, NC | L 38–23 | 5,715 | |
^{†}Homecoming; Rankings from The Sports Network Poll released prior to the game; All times are in Eastern time
