= 2007 Jacksonville State Gamecocks football team =

American college football season

2007 Jacksonville State Gamecocks football
- Conference: Ohio Valley Conference
- Record: 6–5 (5–3 OVC)
- Head coach: Jack Crowe (8th season)
- Offensive coordinator: Ronnie Letson (4th season)
- Defensive coordinator: Greg Stewart (8th season)
- Home stadium: Paul Snow Stadium

2007 Ohio Valley Conference football standings
	Conf.			Overall
Team	W		L	W		L
No. 13 Eastern Kentucky $^	8	–	0	9	–	3
No. 18 Eastern Illinois ^	7	–	1	8	–	4
Austin Peay	5	–	3	7	–	4
Jacksonville State	5	–	3	6	–	5
Tennessee State	4	–	3	5	–	6
Tennessee–Martin	4	–	4	4	–	7
Samford	2	–	6	4	–	7
Tennessee Tech	2	–	6	4	–	7
Southeast Missouri State	1	–	6	3	–	8
Murray State	1	–	7	2	–	9
$ – Conference champion; ^ – FCS playoff participant; Rankings from The Sports Network poll

The 2007 Jacksonville State Gamecocks football team represented Jacksonville State University as a member of the Ohio Valley Conference (OVC) during the 2007 NCAA Division I FCS football season. Led by Eight-year head coach Jack Crowe, the Gamecocks compiled an overall record of 6–5 with a mark of 5–3 in conference play, tying for third place in the OVC. Jacksonville State played home games at Paul Snow Stadium in Jacksonville, Alabama.

== Schedule ==
Date	Time	Opponent	Site	Result	Attendance	Source
September 1	7:00 p.m.	at Alabama State*	Cramton Bowl; Montgomery, AL	L 19–24	17,316	
September 8	2:30 p.m.	Chattanooga*	Paul Snow Stadium; Jacksonville, AL	W 33–19	10,123	
September 15	7:00 p.m.	at Memphis*	Liberty Bowl Memorial Stadium; Memphis, TN	L 14–35	28,298	
September 22	2:00 p.m.	Eastern Kentucky	Paul Snow Stadium; Jacksonville, AL	L 20–31	12,312	
September 29	3:00 p.m.	at Murray State	Roy Stewart Stadium; Murray, KY	W 40–24	4,555	
October 4	6:00 p.m.	Tennessee–Martin	Paul Snow Stadium; Jacksonville, AL	W 27–24	5,982	
October 13	6:00 p.m.	at Austin Peay	Governors Stadium; Clarksville, TN	W 42–9	5,289	
October 20	2:30 p.m.	Tennessee Tech	Paul Snow Stadium; Jacksonville, AL	W 38–10	12,214	
November 3	1:00 p.m.	at Samford	Seibert Stadium; Homewood, AL (rivalry)	W 24–12	6,273	
November 10	12:00 p.m.	No. 25 Eastern Illinois	Paul Snow Stadium; Jacksonville, AL	L 23–37	8,202	
November 17	1:00 p.m.	at Southeast Missouri State	Houck Stadium; Cape Girardeau, MO	L 25–32	2,325	
*Non-conference game; Rankings from The Sports Network Poll released prior to the game; All times are in Central time
