= 2007 Montana State Bobcats football team =

American college football season

2007 Montana State Bobcats football
- Conference: Big Sky Conference
- Record: 6–5 (4–4 Big Sky)
- Head coach: Rob Ash (1st season)
- Defensive coordinator: Jamie Marshall (1st season)
- Home stadium: Bobcat Stadium

2007 Big Sky Conference football standings
| | Conf. | | | Overall |
| Team | W | | L | W | | L |
|---|---|---|---|---|---|---|
| No. 10 Montana $^ | 8 | – | 0 | 11 | – | 1 |
| No. 8 Eastern Washington ^ | 6 | – | 2 | 9 | – | 4 |
| Northern Arizona | 5 | – | 3 | 6 | – | 5 |
| Montana State | 4 | – | 4 | 6 | – | 5 |
| Weber State | 4 | – | 4 | 5 | – | 6 |
| Portland State | 3 | – | 5 | 3 | – | 8 |
| Sacramento State | 3 | – | 5 | 3 | – | 8 |
| Idaho State | 2 | – | 6 | 3 | – | 8 |
| Northern Colorado | 1 | – | 7 | 1 | – | 11 |
$ – Conference champion; ^ – FCS playoff participant; Rankings from The Sports Network poll

The 2007 Montana State Bobcats football team was an American football team that represented Montana State University in the Big Sky Conference (Big Sky) during the 2007 NCAA Division I FCS football season. In their first season under head coach Rob Ash, the Bobcats compiled a 6–5 record (4–4 against Big Sky opponents) and tied for fourth place in the Big Sky.

== Schedule ==
| Date | Opponent | Rank | Site | Result | Attendance | Source |
|---|---|---|---|---|---|---|
| September 1 | at No. 25 (FBS) Texas A&M* | No. 21 | Kyle Field; College Station, TX | L 7–38 | 79,438 | |
| September 15 | Dixie State* | No. 20 | Bobcat Stadium; Bozeman, MT | W 61–7 | 14,217 | |
| September 22 | at Weber State | No. 18 | Stewart Stadium; Ogden, UT | W 21–5 | 6,782 | |
| September 29 | Idaho State^{†} | No. 18 | Bobcat Stadium; Bozeman, MT | W 40–20 | 14,427 | |
| October 6 | Southern Utah* | No. 13 | Bobcat Stadium; Bozeman, MT | W 7–3 | 14,337 | |
| October 13 | at Eastern Washington | No. 11 | Woodward Stadium; Cheney, WA | L 13–35 | 7,326 | |
| October 20 | Sacramento State | No. 20 | Bobcat Stadium; Bozeman, MT | W 20–9 | 14,167 | |
| October 27 | at Northern Colorado | No. 19 | Nottingham Field; Greeley, CO | L 13–16 | 3,033 | |
| November 3 | at Northern Arizona | | Walkup Skydome; Flagstaff, AZ | L 14–29 | | |
| November 10 | at Portland State | | PGE Park; Portland, OR | W 50–36 | 11,786 | |
| November 17 | No. 3 Montana | | Bobcat Stadium; Bozeman, MT (rivalry) | L 20–41 | 14,877 | |
*Non-conference game; ^{†}Homecoming; Rankings from The Sports Network Poll released prior to the game
