= 2007 Cal Poly Mustangs football team =

American college football season

2007 Cal Poly Mustangs football
- Conference: Great West Conference

Ranking
- Sports Network: No. 24
- Record: 7–4 (2–2 GWC)
- Head coach: Rich Ellerson (7th season)
- Offensive coordinator: Joe DuPaix (4th season)
- Offensive scheme: Triple option
- Base defense: 4–3
- Home stadium: Alex G. Spanos Stadium

2007 Great West Conference football standings
	Conf.			Overall
Team	W		L	W		L
No. 19 South Dakota State $	4	–	0	7	–	4
No. 9 North Dakota State	3	–	1	10	–	1
No. 24 Cal Poly	2	–	2	7	–	4
UC Davis	1	–	3	5	–	6
Southern Utah	0	–	4	0	–	11
$ – Conference champion; Rankings from The Sports Network poll

The 2007 Cal Poly Mustangs football team represented California Polytechnic State University, San Luis Obispo as member of the Great West Conference (GWC) during the 2007 NCAA Division I FCS football season. Led by seventh-year head coach Rich Ellerson, Cal Poly compiled an overall record of 7–4 with a mark of 2–2 in conference play, placing third in the GWC. The team outscored its opponents 432 to 278 for the season, scoring an average of almost 40 points a game. The Mustangs played home games at Alex G. Spanos Stadium in San Luis Obispo, California.

== Schedule ==
Date	Time	Opponent	Rank	Site	Result	Attendance	Source
September 1		at Texas State*	No. 15	Bobcat Stadium; San Marcos, TX	L 35–38	13,007	
September 8		at Idaho*	No. 22	Kibbie Dome; Moscow, ID	L 13–20	9,820	
September 15	6:00 p.m.	Weber State*		Alex G. Spanos Stadium; San Luis Obispo, CA	W 47–19	11,075	
September 22		Western Oregon*	No. 24	Alex G. Spanos Stadium; San Luis Obispo, CA	W 24–17		
September 29		Northern Colorado*		Alex G. Spanos Stadium; San Luis Obispo, CA	W 56–21	9,684	
October 13		at UC Davis	No. 22	Aggie Stadium; Davis, CA (Battle for the Golden Horseshoe)	W 63–28	10,743	
October 20		at South Dakota State	No. 19	Coughlin–Alumni Stadium; Brookings, SD	L 35–48		
October 27		at Idaho State*		Holt Arena; Pocatello, ID	W 48–28	6,037	
November 3		at Southern Utah		Eccles Coliseum; Cedar City, UT	W 28–21		
November 10		No. 2 North Dakota State	No. 24	Alex G. Spanos Stadium; San Luis Obispo, CA	L 28–31	10,899	
November 17		Iona*	No. 25	Alex G. Spanos Stadium; San Luis Obispo, CA	W 55–7	7,727	
*Non-conference game; Rankings from The Sports Network Poll released prior to the game; All times are in Pacific time
