= 2007 Eastern Illinois Panthers football team =

American college football season

2007 Eastern Illinois Panthers football

NCAA Division I First Round, L 11–30 vs. Southern Illinois
- Conference: Ohio Valley Conference

Ranking
- Sports Network: No. 18
- Record: 8–4 (7–1 OVC)
- Head coach: Bob Spoo (20th season)
- Offensive coordinator: Jorge Munoz
- Defensive coordinator: Roc Bellantoni
- Home stadium: O'Brien Field

2007 Ohio Valley Conference football standings
	Conf.			Overall
Team	W		L	W		L
No. 13 Eastern Kentucky $^	8	–	0	9	–	3
No. 18 Eastern Illinois ^	7	–	1	8	–	4
Austin Peay	5	–	3	7	–	4
Jacksonville State	5	–	3	6	–	5
Tennessee State	4	–	3	5	–	6
Tennessee–Martin	4	–	4	4	–	7
Samford	2	–	6	4	–	7
Tennessee Tech	2	–	6	4	–	7
Southeast Missouri State	1	–	6	3	–	8
Murray State	1	–	7	2	–	9
$ – Conference champion; ^ – FCS playoff participant; Rankings from The Sports Network poll

The 2007 Eastern Illinois Panthers football team represented Eastern Illinois University as a member of the Ohio Valley Conference (OVC) during the 2007 NCAA Division I FCS football season. The team was led by 20th-year head coach Bob Spoo and played their home games at O'Brien Field in Charleston, Illinois. The Panthers finished the season with an 8–4 record overall and a 7–1 record in conference play. The team received an at-large bid to the NCAA Division I Football Championship playoffs, where they lost to Southern Illinois in the first round. Eastern Illinois was ranked No. 18 in The Sports Network's postseason ranking of NCAA Division I FCS teams.

Wide receivers coach Jorge Munoz was promoted to offensive coordinator prior to the season, though he had already handled play-calling duties in 2006.

== Schedule ==
Date	Opponent	Rank	Site	Result	Attendance	Source
August 30	Tennessee Tech	No. 17	O'Brien Field; Charleston, IL	W 45–25		
September 8	at Purdue*	No. 12	Ross–Ade Stadium; West Lafayette, IN	L 6–52	52,504	
September 15	No. 17 Illinois State*	No. 14	O'Brien Field; Charleston, IL (rivalry)	L 21–24	9,028	
September 22	at Indiana State*	No. 20	Memorial Stadium; Terre Haute, IN	W 54–20	4,079	
September 29	at Southeast Missouri State	No. 19	Houck Stadium; Cape Girardeau, MO	W 31–16	9,925	
October 6	Eastern Kentucky	No. 16	O'Brien Field; Charleston, IL	L 21–28	9,861	
October 13	at Murray State	No. 24	Roy Stewart Stadium; Murray, KY	W 27–24	5,843	
October 20	Tennessee–Martin		O'Brien Field; Charleston, IL	W 29–23	8,151	
October 27	at Tennessee State		LP Field; Nashville, TN	W 38–35	8,935	
November 10	at Jacksonville State	No. 25	Paul Snow Stadium; Jacksonville, AL	W 37–23	8,202	
November 17	Samford	No. 21	O'Brien Field; Charleston, IL	W 33–17	3,083	
November 24	at No. 4 Southern Illinois*	No. 18	McAndrew Stadium; Carbondale, IL (NCAA Division I First Round)	L 11–30	6,124	
*Non-conference game; Rankings from The Sports Network Poll released prior to the game
