= 2007 San Diego Toreros football team =

American college football season

2007 San Diego Toreros football

PFL co-champion
- Conference: Pioneer Football League
- Record: 9–2 (6–1 PFL)
- Head coach: Ron Caragher (1st season)
- Home stadium: Torero Stadium

2007 Pioneer Football League standings
	Conf.			Overall
Team	W		L	W		L
Dayton +	6	–	1	11	–	1
San Diego +	6	–	1	9	–	2
Morehead State	5	–	2	7	–	4
Davidson	4	–	3	6	–	4
Drake	3	–	4	6	–	5
Valparaiso	2	–	5	5	–	6
Jacksonville	2	–	5	3	–	8
Butler	0	–	7	4	–	7
+ – Conference co-champions

The 2007 San Diego Toreros football team represented the University of San Diego as a member of the Pioneer Football League (PFL) during the 2007 NCAA Division I FCS football season. In their first year under head coach Ron Caragher, the Toreros compiled an 9–2 record and 6–1 in conference play, sharing the PFL title with Dayton.

== Schedule ==
Date	Time	Opponent	Rank	Site	Result	Attendance	Source
September 1	7:00 p.m.	at Azusa Pacific*		Citrus Stadium; Azusa, CA	W 42–32		
September 8	6:00 p.m.	Marist*		Torero Stadium; San Diego, CA	W 38–17		
September 15	6:00 p.m.	Northern Colorado*		Torero Stadium; San Diego, CA	W 49–13		
September 29	10:00 a.m.	at Butler		Bud and Jackie Sellick Bowl; Indianapolis, IN	W 56–9		
October 6	11:00 a.m.	at Valparaiso		Brown Field; Valparaiso, IN	W 41–27		
October 13	6:00 p.m.	Drake		Torero Stadium; San Diego, CA	W 59–19		
October 20	6:00 p.m.	Jacksonville	No. 20	Torero Stadium; San Diego, CA	W 62–23	3,544	
October 27	10:00 a.m.	at Dayton		Welcome Stadium; Dayton, OH	L 16–35		
November 3	2:00 p.m.	Davidson		Torero Stadium; San Diego, CA	W 52–49	3,021	
November 10	10:00 a.m.	at Morehead State		Jayne Stadium; Morehead, KY	W 27–14		
November 17	1:05 p.m.	at UC Davis*		Aggie Stadium; Davis, CA	L 46–49		
*Non-conference game; Rankings from Coaches' Poll released prior to the game; All times are in Pacific time
