= 2007 Saint Francis Red Flash football team =

American college football season

2007 Saint Francis Red Flash football
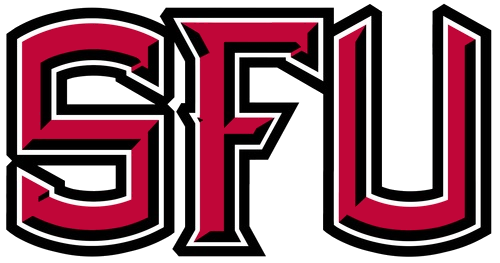
- Conference: Northeast Conference
- Record: 3–7 (2–4 NEC)
- Head coach: Dave Opfar (6th season)
- Home stadium: DeGol Field

2007 Northeast Conference football standings
| | Conf. | | | Overall |
| Team | W | | L | W | | L |
|---|---|---|---|---|---|---|
| Albany $ | 6 | – | 0 | 8 | – | 4 |
| Central Connecticut State | 4 | – | 2 | 6 | – | 5 |
| Wagner | 3 | – | 3 | 7 | – | 4 |
| Monmouth | 3 | – | 3 | 4 | – | 6 |
| Robert Morris | 3 | – | 3 | 4 | – | 6 |
| Saint Francis (PA) | 2 | – | 4 | 3 | – | 7 |
| Sacred Heart | 0 | – | 6 | 3 | – | 8 |
$ – Conference champion

The 2007 Saint Francis Red Flash football team represented Saint Francis University as a member of the Northeast Conference (NEC) during the 2007 NCAA Division I FCS football season. The Red Flash were led by sixth-year head coach Dave Opfar and played their home games at DeGol Field. They finished the season 3–7 overall and 2–4 in NEC play to place fourth.

== Schedule ==
| Date | Time | Opponent | Site | Result | Attendance | Source |
|---|---|---|---|---|---|---|
| September 8 | 1:00 p.m. | Morehead State* | DeGol Field; Loretto, PA | L 14–21 | 1,335 | |
| September 15 | 1:00 p.m. | at Robert Morris | Joe Walton Stadium; Moon Township, PA | L 14–28 | 1,784 | |
| September 29 | 7:00 p.m. | at Liberty* | Williams Stadium; Lynchburg, VA | L 10–68 | 13,893 | |
| October 6 | 1:00 p.m. | Central Connecticut State | DeGol Field; Loretto, PA | L 7–43 | 1,014 | |
| October 13 | 1:00 p.m. | Duquesne* | DeGol Field; Loretto, PA | L 17–24 | 628 | |
| October 20 | 1:00 p.m. | Albany | DeGol Field; Loretto, PA | L 21–58 | 1,172 | |
| October 27 | 1:00 p.m. | at Sacred Heart | Campus Field; Fairfield, CT | W 35–30 | 2,004 | |
| November 3 | 1:00 p.m. | Monmouth | DeGol Field; Loretto, PA | L 17–47 | 2,031 | |
| November 10 | 1:00 p.m. | at Wagner | Wagner College Stadium; Staten Island, NY | W 23–20 | 877 | |
| November 17 | 1:00 p.m. | at La Salle* | McCarthy Stadium; Philadelphia, PA | W 51–10 | 750 | |
*Non-conference game; All times are in Eastern time
