= 2007 North Dakota State Bison football team =

American college football season

2007 North Dakota State Bison football
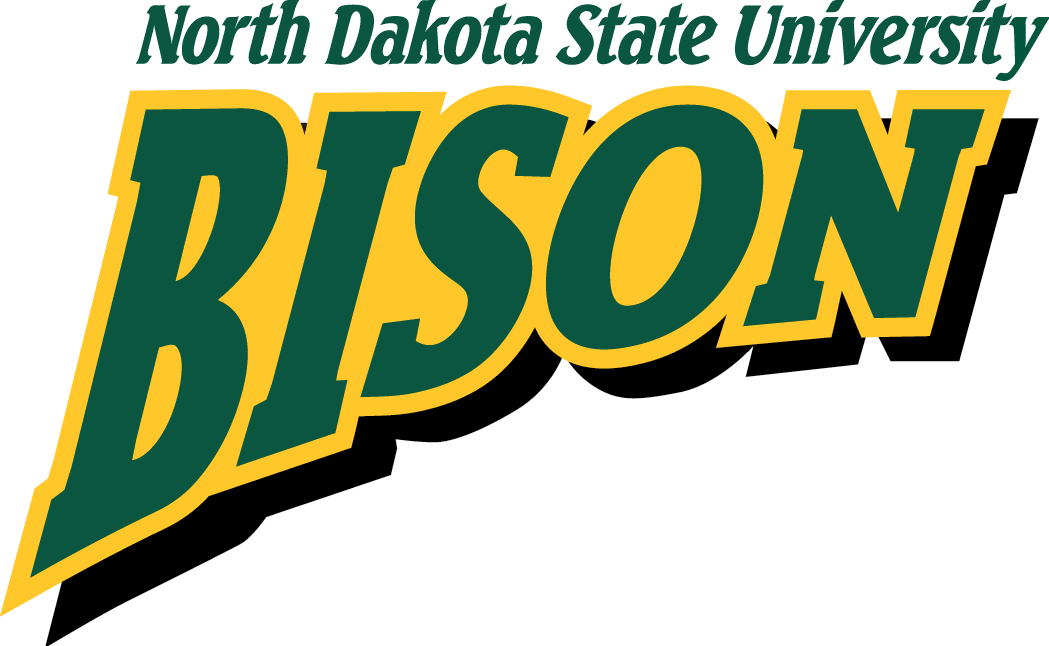
- Conference: Great West Conference

Ranking
- Sports Network: No. 9
- FCS Coaches: No. 9
- Record: 10–1 (3–1 Great West)
- Head coach: Craig Bohl (5th season)
- Offensive coordinator: Patrick Perles (3rd season)
- Offensive scheme: Pro-style
- Defensive coordinator: Willie Mack Garza (3rd season)
- Base defense: 4–3
- Home stadium: Fargodome

2007 Great West Conference football standings
	Conf.			Overall
Team	W		L	W		L
No. 19 South Dakota State $	4	–	0	7	–	4
No. 9 North Dakota State	3	–	1	10	–	1
No. 24 Cal Poly	2	–	2	7	–	4
UC Davis	1	–	3	5	–	6
Southern Utah	0	–	4	0	–	11
$ – Conference champion; Rankings from The Sports Network poll

The 2007 North Dakota State Bison football team represented North Dakota State University in the 2007 NCAA Division I FCS football season. The team was led by fifth-year head coach Craig Bohl and played their homes games at the Fargodome in Fargo, North Dakota. The Bison finished with an overall record of 10–1, placing second in the Great West Conference with a 3–1 mark. North Dakota State averaged 40 points per game and allowing just 22 points per game to opponents. The Bison totaled 4,855 total yards of offense, an average of 441 yards per game.

Despite being ranked in the top five in both polls the entire year, North Dakota State was ineligible to make the playoffs per NCAA rules that mandated a four-year probationary period for football programs entering the NCAA Division I Football Championship Subdivision. During their first four years after moving to Division I (2004–2007), North Dakota State had a record of 35–9 (.795) and were ranked in the top-25 32 of 44 weeks.

== Schedule ==
Date	Time	Opponent	Rank	Site	Result	Attendance	Source
September 8	6:35 pm	Stephen F. Austin*	No. 4	Fargodome; Fargo, ND	W 28–19	18,823	
September 15	6:00 pm	No. 16 Sam Houston State*	No. 5	Fargodome; Fargo, ND	W 41–38	18,961	
September 22	6:40 pm	at Central Michigan*	No. 5	Kelly/Shorts Stadium; Mount Pleasant, MI	W 44–14	16,522	
September 29	1:05 pm	at No. 17 Western Illinois*	No. 4	Hanson Field; Macomb, IL	W 41–28	15,619	
October 4	1:00 pm	UC Davis^{†}	No. 3	Fargodome; Fargo, ND	W 35–16	19,011	
October 13	2:00 pm	Mississippi Valley State*	No. 3	Rice–Totten Stadium; Itta Bena, MS	W 58–7	4,986	
October 20	11:00 am	at Minnesota*	No. 2	Metrodome; Minneapolis, MN	W 27–21	63,088	
October 27	3:05 pm	at Southern Utah	No. 2	Fargodome; Fargo, ND (Harvest Bowl)	W 52–17	15,796	
November 3	6:00 pm	Illinois State*	No. 2	Fargodome; Fargo, ND (Harvest Bowl)	W 54–28	18,116	
November 10	1:00 pm	at No. 24 Cal Poly	No. 2	Alex G. Spanos Stadium; San Luis Obispo, CA	W 31–28	10,899	
November 17	1:00 pm	South Dakota State	No. 2	Coughlin–Alumni Stadium; Brookings, SD (Dakota Marker)	L 24–29	16,345	
*Non-conference game; ^{†}Homecoming; Rankings from The Sports Network Poll released prior to the game; All times are in Central time

== Rankings ==
Ranking movements Legend: ██ Increase in ranking ██ Decrease in ranking ( ) = First-place votes
	Week													
Poll	Pre	1	2	3	4	5	6	7	8	9	10	11	12	Final
The Sports Network	4	4	5	4	4 (14)	3 (19)	3 (24)	2 (23)	2 (47)	2 (37)	2 (42)	2 (23)	8 (1)	9
Coaches Poll	4	4	4	4	3 (3)	2 (4)	1 (8)	1 (12)	1 (21	1 (16)	1 (18)	1 (17)	5 (3)	9

== Game summaries ==
=== Stephen F. Austin ===
Stephen F. Austin Lumberjacks at No. 4 North Dakota State Bison – Game summary

Quarter	1	2	3	4	Total
Lumberjacks	7	9	3	0	19
No. 4 Bison	14	0	14	0	28

at Fargodome, Fargo, North Dakota

- Date: September 8
- Game time: 6:35 p.m. CDT
- Game weather: None (played indoors)
- Game attendance: 18,823
- Referee: Rod Snodgrass
- Box score, Recap

Game information
First quarter
- NDSU – Tyler Roehl 2-yard run (Shawn Bibeau kick), 7:07. Bison 7–0. Drive: 9 plays, 87 yards, 4:24.
- SFA – Aaron Rhea 64-yard pass from Danny Southall (Cory Long kick), 5:19. Tied 7–7. Drive: 3 plays, 69 yards, 1:48.
- NDSU – Tyler Roehl 10-yard run (Shawn Bibeau kick), 2:56. Bison 14–7. Drive: 6 plays, 71 yards, 2:23.

Second quarter

- SFA – Cory Long 20-yard field goal, 12:42. Bison 14–10. Drive: 5 plays, 41 yards, 2:18.
- SFA – Cory Long 46-yard field goal, 7:28. Bison 14–13. Drive: 6 plays, 23 yards, 2:46.
- SFA – Cory Long 27-yard field goal, 0:00. Lumberjacks 16–14. Drive: 13 plays, 81 yards, 2:13.

Third quarter

- NDSU – Tyler Roehl 17-yard run (Shawn Bibeau kick), 11:46. Bison 21–16. Drive: 7 plays, 58 yards, 3:14.
- SFA – Cory Long 47-yard field goal, 5:40. Bison 21–19. Drive: 7 plays, 16 yards, 3:04.
- NDSU – Pete Blincoe 1-yard run (Shawn Bibeau kick), 1:12. Bison 28–19. Drive: 9 plays, 63 yards, 4:28.

Fourth quarter

- No scoring plays

Statistics	SFA	NDSU
First downs	13	28
Total yards	325	571
Rushing yards	129	350
Passing yards	196	221
Turnovers	0	5
Time of possession	28:00	32:00

Team	Category	Player	Statistics
Stephen F. Austin	Passing	Danny Southall	18/33, 196 yards, TD
Stephen F. Austin	Rushing	Danny Southall	20 rushes, 82 yards
Stephen F. Austin	Receiving	Aaron Rhea	2 receptions, 69 yards, TD
North Dakota State	Passing	Steve Walker	12/18, 174 yards, 4 INT
North Dakota State	Rushing	Tyler Roehl	27 rushes, 238 yards, 3 TD
North Dakota State	Receiving	Kole Heckendorf	6 receptions, 65 yards

=== At Central Michigan ===
No. 5 North Dakota State Bison at Central Michigan Chippewas – Game summary

Quarter	1	2	3	4	Total
No. 5 Bison	3	13	14	14	44
Chippewas	0	7	7	0	14

at Kelly/Shorts Stadium, Mount Pleasant, Michigan

- Date: September 22
- Game time: 3:30 p.m. CDT
- Game weather: Sunny and clear, 72 °F (22 °C)
- Game attendance: 16,522
- Referee: Ed Smith
- Box score, Recap

Statistics	NDSU	CMU
First downs		
Total yards		
Rushing yards		
Passing yards		
Turnovers		
Time of possession		

Team	Category	Player	Statistics
North Dakota State	Passing		
North Dakota State	Rushing		
North Dakota State	Receiving		
Central Michigan	Passing		
Central Michigan	Rushing		
Central Michigan	Receiving		

=== At Minnesota ===
No. 2 North Dakota State Bison at Minnesota Golden Gophers – Game summary

Quarter	1	2	3	4	Total
No. 2 Bison	14	3	0	10	27
Golden Gophers	7	7	7	0	21

at Hubert H. Humphrey Metrodome, Minneapolis, Minnesota

- Date: October 20
- Game time: 11:00 a.m. CDT
- Game weather: None (played indoors)
- Game attendance: 63,088
- Referee: Todd Geerlings
- TV: BTN
- Box score, Recap

Statistics	NDSU	MINN
First downs		
Total yards		
Rushing yards		
Passing yards		
Turnovers		
Time of possession		

Team	Category	Player	Statistics
North Dakota State	Passing		
North Dakota State	Rushing		
North Dakota State	Receiving		
Minnesota	Passing		
Minnesota	Rushing		
Minnesota	Receiving		
