= 2007 Montana Grizzlies football team =

American college football season

2007 Montana Grizzlies football

Big Sky champion

NCAA Division I-AA First Round, L 22–23 vs. Wofford
- Conference: Big Sky Conference

Ranking
- Sports Network: No. 10
- Record: 11–1 (8–0 Big Sky)
- Head coach: Bobby Hauck (5th season)
- Offensive coordinator: Rob Phenicie (5th season)
- Defensive coordinator: Kraig Paulson (4th season)
- Home stadium: Washington–Grizzly Stadium

2007 Big Sky Conference football standings
	Conf.			Overall
Team	W		L	W		L
No. 10 Montana $^	8	–	0	11	–	1
No. 8 Eastern Washington ^	6	–	2	9	–	4
Northern Arizona	5	–	3	6	–	5
Montana State	4	–	4	6	–	5
Weber State	4	–	4	5	–	6
Portland State	3	–	5	3	–	8
Sacramento State	3	–	5	3	–	8
Idaho State	2	–	6	3	–	8
Northern Colorado	1	–	7	1	–	11
$ – Conference champion; ^ – FCS playoff participant; Rankings from The Sports Network poll

The 2007 Montana Grizzlies football team represented the University of Montana as a member of the Big Sky Conference during the 2007 NCAA Division I FCS football season. Led by fifth-year head coach Bobby Hauck, the Grizzlies compiled an overall record of 11–1 with a mark of 8–0 in conference play, winning Big Sky title. Montana advanced to the NCAA Division I-AA Football Championship playoffs, where the Grizzlies lost to Wofford in the first round. The team played home games at Washington–Grizzly Stadium in Missoula, Montana.

== Schedule ==
Date	Time	Opponent	Rank	Site	TV	Result	Attendance	Source
September 1	1:00 pm	Southern Utah*	No. 2	Washington–Grizzly Stadium; Missoula, MT	KPAX	W 37–17	23,599	
September 8	1:00 pm	Fort Lewis*	No. 3	Washington–Grizzly Stadium; Missoula, MT	KPAX	W 49–0	22,866	
September 22	1:00 pm	Albany*	No. 2	Washington–Grizzly Stadium; Missoula, MT	KPAX	W 35–14	23,097	
September 29	1:00 pm	Weber State	No. 1	Washington–Grizzly Stadium; Missoula, MT	KPAX	W 18–10	23,267	
October 6	1:00 pm	Eastern Washington	No. 1	Washington–Grizzly Stadium; Missoula, MT (EWU–UM Governors Cup)	KPAX	W 24–23	23,226	
October 13	3:00 pm	at Sacramento State	No. 1	Hornet Stadium; Sacramento, CA	KPAX	W 17–3	10,034	
October 20	1:00 pm	Northern Colorado	No. 3	Washington–Grizzly Stadium; Missoula, MT	KPAX	W 52–7	23,134	
October 27	4:00 pm	at Northern Arizona	No. 3	Walkup Skydome; Flagstaff, AZ	KPAX	W 21–16	8,364	
November 3	12:00 pm	Portland State	No. 4	Washington–Grizzly Stadium; Missoula, MT	KPAX	W 34–31	23,446	
November 10	3:00 pm	at Idaho State	No. 3	Holt Arena; Pocatello, ID	KPAX	W 27–14	8,645	
November 17	12:30 pm	at Montana State	No. 3	Bobcat Stadium; Bozeman, MT (rivalry)	KPAX	W 41–20	14,877	
November 24	12:00 pm	No. 11 Wofford*	No. 3	Washington–Grizzly Stadium; Missoula, MT (NCAA Division I First Round)	KPAX	L 22–23	19,761	
*Non-conference game; Rankings from The Sports Network Poll released prior to the game; All times are in Mountain time

== Roster ==
2007 Montana Grizzlies football team roster
Players
Coaches
Offense

Pos.	#	Name	Class
QB	14	Cole Bergquist	Jr
RB	38	Lex Hilliard	Sr
WR	80	Marc Mariani	So

Defense

Pos.	#	Name	Class
FS	19	Colt Anderson	Jr
DE	53	Kroy Biermann	Sr
FS	39	Shann Schillinger	So

Special teams

Pos.	#	Name	Class
K	29	Dan Carpenter	Sr

Head coach

- Bobby Hauck

Coordinators/assistant coaches

- Cedric Cormier (Wide receivers coach)
- Tim Hauck (Secondary coach)

Legend

- (C) Team captain
- (S) Suspended
- (I) Ineligible
- Injured
- Redshirt

Roster
