= 2007 Wagner Seahawks football team =

American college football season

2007 Wagner Seahawks football
- Conference: Northeast Conference
- Record: 7–4 (3–3 NEC)
- Head coach: Walt Hameline (27th season)
- Home stadium: Wagner College Stadium

2007 Northeast Conference football standings
	Conf.			Overall
Team	W		L	W		L
Albany $	6	–	0	8	–	4
Central Connecticut State	4	–	2	6	–	5
Wagner	3	–	3	7	–	4
Monmouth	3	–	3	4	–	6
Robert Morris	3	–	3	4	–	6
Saint Francis (PA)	2	–	4	3	–	7
Sacred Heart	0	–	6	3	–	8
$ – Conference champion

The 2007 Wagner Seahawks football team represented Wagner College in the 2007 NCAA Division I FCS football season as a member of the Northeast Conference (NEC). The Seahawks were led by 27th-year head coach Walt Hameline and played their home games at Wagner College Stadium. Wagner finished the season 7–4 overalland 3–3 in NEC play to place in a three-way tie for third.

== Schedule ==
Date	Time	Opponent	Site	Result	Attendance
August 31	7:00 p.m.	at Western Connecticut State*	Westside Athletic Complex; Danbury, CT	W 20–7	1,923
September 8	1:00 p.m.	at Iona*	Mazzella Field; New Rochelle, NY	L 14–17 ^{OT}	1,130
September 15	1:00 p.m.	Marist*	Wagner College Stadium; Staten Island, NY	W 21–14	2,785
September 29	1:00 p.m.	Sacred Heart	Wagner College Stadium; Staten Island, NY	W 18–15	1,911
October 6	1:00 p.m.	at Robert Morris	Joe Walton Stadium; Moon Township, PA	W 20–13	2,895
October 13	1:00 p.m.	at Monmouth	Kessler Field; West Long Branch, NJ	W 45–16	3,954
October 20	1:00 p.m.	Central Connecticut	Wagner College Stadium; Staten Island, NY	L 13–21	1,274
October 27	1:00 p.m.	Albany	Wagner College Stadium; Staten Island, NY	L 10–24	688
November 3	1:00 p.m.	La Salle*	Wagner College Stadium; Staten Island, NY	W 28–0	730
November 10	1:00 p.m.	Saint Francis (PA)	Wagner College Stadium; Staten Island, NY	L 20–23	877
November 17	Noon	at Jacksonville*	D. B. Milne Field; Jacksonville, FL	W 41–27	2,283
*Non-conference game; All times are in Eastern time
