= 2007 Eastern Kentucky Colonels football team =

American college football season

2007 Eastern Kentucky Colonels football

OVC champion

NCAA Division I First Round, L 14–31 vs. Richmond
- Conference: Ohio Valley Conference

Ranking
- Sports Network: No. 13
- Record: 9–3 (8–0 OVC)
- Head coach: Danny Hope (5th season)
- Home stadium: Roy Kidd Stadium

2007 Ohio Valley Conference football standings
	Conf.			Overall
Team	W		L	W		L
No. 13 Eastern Kentucky $^	8	–	0	9	–	3
No. 18 Eastern Illinois ^	7	–	1	8	–	4
Austin Peay	5	–	3	7	–	4
Jacksonville State	5	–	3	6	–	5
Tennessee State	4	–	3	5	–	6
Tennessee–Martin	4	–	4	4	–	7
Samford	2	–	6	4	–	7
Tennessee Tech	2	–	6	4	–	7
Southeast Missouri State	1	–	6	3	–	8
Murray State	1	–	7	2	–	9
$ – Conference champion; ^ – FCS playoff participant; Rankings from The Sports Network poll

The 2007 Eastern Kentucky Colonels football team represented Eastern Kentucky University in the 2007 NCAA Division I FCS football season. The team was led by fifth-year head coach Danny Hope and played their home games at Roy Kidd Stadium in Richmond, Kentucky. The Colonels finished the season with a 9–3 overall record and an undefeated 8–0 record in Ohio Valley Conference games, making them conference champions. They qualified for the NCAA Division I Football Championship playoffs, where they lost to Richmond in the first round. Eastern Kentucky was ranked No. 13 in The Sports Network's postseason NCAA Division I FCS poll.

== Schedule ==
Date	Opponent	Rank	Site	Result	Attendance	Source
September 1	at Kentucky*		Commonwealth Stadium; Lexington, KY	L 10–50	66,512	
September 8	Western Carolina*		Roy Kidd Stadium; Richmond, KY	W 45–21	9,300	
September 15	at Western Kentucky*		Houchens Industries–L. T. Smith Stadium; Bowling Green, KY (Battle of the Bluegrass)	L 6–26	18,898	
September 22	at Jacksonville State		Paul Snow Stadium; Jacksonville, AL	W 31–20	12,312	
September 29	Samford		Roy Kidd Stadium; Richmond, KY	W 43–20	10,100	
October 6	at No. 16 Eastern Illinois		O'Brien Field; Charleston, IL	W 28–21	9,861	
October 13	Southeast Missouri State	No. 23	Roy Kidd Stadium; Richmond, KY	W 44–17	6,400	
October 20	Tennessee State^{†}	No. 21	Roy Kidd Stadium; Richmond, KY	W 49–7	11,500	
October 27	at Murray State	No. 16	Roy Stewart Stadium; Murray, KY	W 46–35	2,851	
November 10	at Austin Peay	No. 13	Governors Stadium; Clarksville, TN	W 28–14	3,978	
November 17	Tennessee Tech	No. 12	Tucker Stadium; Cookeville, TN	W 38–24	5,500	
November 24	at Richmond*	No. 9	University of Richmond Stadium; Richmond, VA (NCAA Division I First Round)	L 14–31	3,253	
*Non-conference game; ^{†}Homecoming; Rankings from The Sports Network Poll released prior to the game
