= 2007 Davidson Wildcats football team =

American college football season

2007 Davidson Wildcats football
- Conference: Pioneer Football League
- Record: 6–4 (4–3 PFL)
- Head coach: Tripp Merritt (3rd season)
- Home stadium: Richardson Stadium

2007 Pioneer Football League standings
	Conf.			Overall
Team	W		L	W		L
Dayton +	6	–	1	11	–	1
San Diego +	6	–	1	9	–	2
Morehead State	5	–	2	7	–	4
Davidson	4	–	3	6	–	4
Drake	3	–	4	6	–	5
Valparaiso	2	–	5	5	–	6
Jacksonville	2	–	5	3	–	8
Butler	0	–	7	4	–	7
+ – Conference co-champions

The 2007 Davidson Wildcats football team represented Davidson College as a member of the Pioneer Football League (PFL) during the 2007 NCAA Division I FCS football season. Led by third-year head coach Tripp Merritt, the Wildcats compiled an overall record of 6–4 with a mark of 4–3 in conference play, placing fourth in the PFL. The team played home games at Richardson Stadium in Davidson, North Carolina.

== Schedule ==
Date	Time	Opponent	Site	Result	Attendance
September 1	7:00 p.m.	UNC Pembroke*	Richardson Stadium; Davidson, NC	W 31–21	4,217
September 8	1:30 p.m.	at Wingate*	Irwin Belk Stadium; Wingate, NC	L 30–33	2,019
September 15	1:00 p.m.	Lenoir–Rhyne*	Richardson Stadium; Davidson, NC	W 21–20	4,052
September 29	12:00 p.m.	at Jacksonville	D. B. Milne Field; Jacksonville, FL	W 20-10	2,140
October 6	1:00 p.m.	Morehead State	Richardson Stadium; Davidson, NC	L 21–49	2,917
October 13	1:00 p.m.	at Dayton	Welcome Stadium; Dayton, OH	L 28–38	2,651
October 20	7:00 p.m.	Drake	Richardson Stadium; Davidson, NC	W 24–21	3,056
October 27	1:00 p.m.	at Butler	Bud and Jackie Sellick Bowl; Indianapolis, IN	W 44–32	2,102
November 3	5:00 p.m.	at San Diego	Torero Stadium; San Diego, CA	L 49–52	3,021
November 10	12:00 p.m.	Valparaiso	Richardson Stadium; Davidson, NC	W 44–6	3,258
*Non-conference game; All times are in Eastern time
