= 2007 La Salle Explorers football team =

American college football season

2007 La Salle Explorers football
- Conference: Metro Atlantic Athletic Conference
- Record: 0–10 (0–3 MAAC)
- Head coach: Tim Miller (2nd season)
- Home stadium: McCarthy Stadium

2007 Metro Atlantic Athletic Conference football standings
	Conf.			Overall
Team	W		L	W		L
Iona +	2	–	1	7	–	4
Duquesne +	2	–	1	6	–	4
Marist +	2	–	1	3	–	8
La Salle	0	–	3	0	–	10
+ – Conference co-champions

The 2007 La Salle Explorers football team was an American football team that represented La Salle University as a member of the Metro Atlantic Athletic Conference (MAAC) during the 2007 NCAA Division I FCS football season. In their second year under head coach Tim Miller, the Explorers compiled a 0–10 record.

On November 19, the university discontinued the Explorer football program. Its discontinuance was a result of the demise of MAAC-sponsored football, and a lack of regional schools competing without scholarship at the FCS level.

== Schedule ==
Date	Opponent	Site	Result	Attendance	Source
August 30	Ursinus*	McCarthy Stadium; Philadelphia, PA	L 0–28		
September 8	at Sacred Heart*	Campus Field; Fairfield, CT	L 14–54		
September 21	TCNJ*	McCarthy Stadium; Philadelphia, PA	L 12–13		
September 29	at Geneva*	Reeves Field; Beaver Falls, PA	L 7–29		
October 6	Iona	McCarthy Stadium; Philadelphia, PA	L 3–56	2,136	
October 13	at Marist	Leonidoff Field; Poughkeepsie, NY	L 10–24		
October 27	Assumption*	McCarthy Stadium; Philadelphia, PA	L 7–10		
November 3	at Wagner*	Wagner College Stadium; Staten Island, NY	L 0–28	730	
November 10	at Duquesne	Arthur J. Rooney Athletic Field; Pittsburgh, PA	L 8–51		
November 17	Saint Francis (PA)*	McCarthy Stadium; Philadelphia, PA	L 10–51	750	
*Non-conference game
