= 2007 Robert Morris Colonials football team =

American college football season

2007 Robert Morris Colonials football
- Conference: Northeast Conference
- Record: 4–6 (3–3 NEC)
- Head coach: Joe Walton (14th season)
- Defensive coordinator: Dan Radakovich (13th season)
- Home stadium: Joe Walton Stadium

2007 Northeast Conference football standings
	Conf.			Overall
Team	W		L	W		L
Albany $	6	–	0	8	–	4
Central Connecticut State	4	–	2	6	–	5
Wagner	3	–	3	7	–	4
Monmouth	3	–	3	4	–	6
Robert Morris	3	–	3	4	–	6
Saint Francis (PA)	2	–	4	3	–	7
Sacred Heart	0	–	6	3	–	8
$ – Conference champion

The 2007 Robert Morris Colonials football team represented Robert Morris University in the 2007 NCAA Division I FCS football season. The Colonials were led by 14th-year head coach Joe Walton and played their home games at Joe Walton Stadium. They were a member of the Northeast Conference.

== Schedule ==
Date	Opponent	Site	Result	Attendance
September 1	Dayton	Joe Walton Stadium; Moon Township, PA	L 12–23	2,246
September 8	at Monmouth	Kessler Field; West Long Branch, NJ	W 20–17	2,444
September 15	Saint Francis	Joe Walton Stadium; Moon Township, PA	W 28–14	1,784
September 22	at Morehead State	Jayne Stadium; Morehead, KY	W 9–8	4,719
September 29	VMI	Joe Walton Stadium; Moon Township, PA	L 13–40	2,157
October 6	Wagner	Joe Walton Stadium; Moon Township, PA	L 13–20	2,895
October 13	at Central Connecticut State	Arute Field; New Britain, CT	L 10–16	3,349
October 20	at Duquesne	Rooney Field; Pittsburgh, PA	L 14–17	1,311
November 3	at Albany	University Field; Albany, NY	L 17–45	2,283
November 10	Sacred Heart	Joe Walton Stadium; Moon Township, PA	W 41–31	1,368
