= 2007 Weber State vs. Portland State football game =

Weber State University vs. Portland State University
Weber State Wildcats	Portland State Vikings
(3–5)	(2–6)
73	68
Head coach: Ron McBride	Head coach: Jerry Glanville
	1	2	3	4	Total
Weber State	3	35	21	14	73
Portland State	7	20	21	20	68
- Date: October 27, 2007
- Season: 2007
- Stadium: PGE Park
- Location: Portland, Oregon
- Attendance: 8,924

The 2007 Weber State-Portland State football game was a college football game held on October 27 at PGE Park, now known as Providence Park, in Portland, Oregon. It pitted the Portland State Vikings against the Weber State Wildcats. The Wildcats defeated the Vikings 73–68. The two teams combined for 141 points, setting a National Collegiate Athletic Association (NCAA) all-division record for most points scored in a game.

This record lasted only two weeks, as on November 10, Hartwick defeated Utica 72–70 in a four-overtime Division III game. In the second round of the NCAA Division II playoffs on November 24, Chadron State defeated Abilene Christian 76–73 in three overtimes after coming back from a 49–20 fourth-quarter deficit to tie the game at 56 at the end of regulation. The following year, in the same round of the Division II playoffs, that record was smashed when Abilene Christian defeated West Texas A&M 93–68 on November 22, 2008. The Weber State-Portland State game held the record for most points scored in a Division I college football game, until November 24, 2018, when Texas A&M defeated LSU by a score of 74–72 in a seven-overtime game.

== Game summary ==
Weber State Wildcats at Portland State Vikings

Quarter	1	2	3	4	Total
Wildcats	3	35	21	14	73
Vikings	7	20	21	20	68

at PGE Park, Portland, Oregon

- Date: October 27, 2007
- Game time: 4:35 p.m. PDT
- Game attendance: 8,924

Weber State scored 35 points in the second quarter to take a 38–27 lead at halftime. By then, the Wildcats already had 443 yards in total offense – 10 yards more than its previous season high for an entire game. Portland State made up for its shaky defense with a high-powered offense that started the second half with a pair of touchdown passes from Drew Hubel, first to David Lewis and then to Tremayne Kirkland, which put the Vikings in front 41–38. Portland State had its last lead of the game when Hubel hit Lewis with an 8-yard touchdown pass at 8:15 of the third quarter to make it 48–45. The Wildcats took the lead for good on their next possession, which chewed up nearly six minutes and culminated with Cameron Higgins 4-yard touchdown pass to Akamu Aki to make the score 52–48. Weber State followed that with Bryant Eteuati's 77-yard punt return for a touchdown and Higgins' 4-yard scoring run, which pushed the Wildcats' advantage to 66–48 early in the fourth quarter. The teams traded touchdowns after that, leaving Weber State in front 73–55 with 4:22 left. Hubel, who was making his first college start, threw his ninth touchdown pass and Andy Shantz returned a fumble 84 yards for a touchdown with 31 seconds left. Hubel's nine touchdown passes set a school and Big Sky Conference record, and also equaled the then-current Division I FCS record for single-game TD passes set in 1984 by Willie Totten of Mississippi Valley State. (Note: This record eventually fell in 2021 when Ren Hefley of Presbyterian threw for 10 TDs against NAIA member St. Andrews.) The Vikings failed to recover the onside kick and Weber State managed to run out the clock.

Portland State QB Drew Hubel's individual performance – 35 completions in 56 attempts for 485 yards, 9 touchdowns and no interceptions – gave the true freshman one of College Sporting News' "Player of the Week" awards in the Football Championship Subdivision for the week of October 29, 2007.

== Statistics ==
Stats from ESPN:

=== Team statistics ===
Team statistical comparison
Statistic	WEB	PSU
First downs	34	23
Third down efficiency	0 of 0	0 of 0
Fourth down efficiency	0 of 0	0 of 0
Rushes–yards	57–353	10–17
Yards per rush	6.2	1.7
Passing yards	334	485
Yards per pass	6.2	1.7
Interceptions thrown	2	0
Fumbles–lost	1–1	1–0
Total offense	687	502
Penalties–yards	10–95	7–64
Turnovers	3	0
Time of possession	38:17	21:43

=== Individual statistics ===
Weber State statistics
Wildcats passing
	C–A	Yds	TD	INT
Cameron Higgins	22–36	334	4	2
Wildcats rushing
	Car	Yds	TD	Avg
Trevyn Smith	38	225	1	5.9
Cameron Higgins	9	106	3	11.8
Eric Lee	3	9	0	3.0
Marcus Mailei	5	8	1	1.6
Bryant Eteuati	1	5	0	5.0
Wildcats receiving
	Rec	Yds	TD	Avg
Tim Toone	8	135	0	16.9
Mike Phillips	8	131	2	16.4
Bryant Eteuati	2	28	1	14.0
Akamu Aki	2	24	1	12.0
Marcus Mailei	1	8	0	8.0
Cody Nakamura	1	8	0	8.0

Portland State statistics
Vikings passing
	C–A	Yds	TD	INT
Drew Hubel	33–56	485	9	0
Vikings rushing
	Car	Yds	TD	Avg
Olaniyi Sobomehin	8	18	0	2.3
Drew Hubel	2	-1	0	-0.5
Vikings receiving
	Rec	Yds	TD	Avg
Tremayne Kirkland	13	177	4	13.6
David Lewis	8	114	4	14.3
Olaniyi Sobomehin	6	91	0	15.2
Kenneth Mackins	6	83	1	13.8
Matt Smith	2	20	0	10.0

== See also ==
- 1916 Cumberland vs. Georgia Tech football game – Georgia Tech 222, Cumberland 0 in a game played before the NCAA began keeping records and against a team that had dropped football.
- 2001 GMAC Bowl – the highest-scoring bowl game in history, both at the end of regulation and the end of the game.
- 2007 Navy vs. North Texas football game – featured the most points scored in a college football game involving NCAA Division I Football Bowl Subdivision opponents during the regulated four quarters of play.
- 2012 Baylor vs. West Virginia football game- the highest scoring game between two ranked teams in FBS history
