= The Dam Cup =

American college football rivalry

- Eastern Washington Eagles Portland State Vikings
- First meeting: October 19, 1968; Portland State, 19–13
- Latest meeting: November 21, 2026; Portland State, 40–38
- Next meeting: October 2, 2027

Statistics
- Total meetings: 47
- All-time series: 23–23–1 (.500)
- Largest victory: Portland State, 51–0 (1975); Eastern Washington, 74–23 (2018)
- Longest win streak: Eastern Washington, 5 (2016–2021); Portland State, 4 (1968–1971)
- Current win streak: Portland State, 1 (2026–present)

Locations of Portland State and Eastern Washington

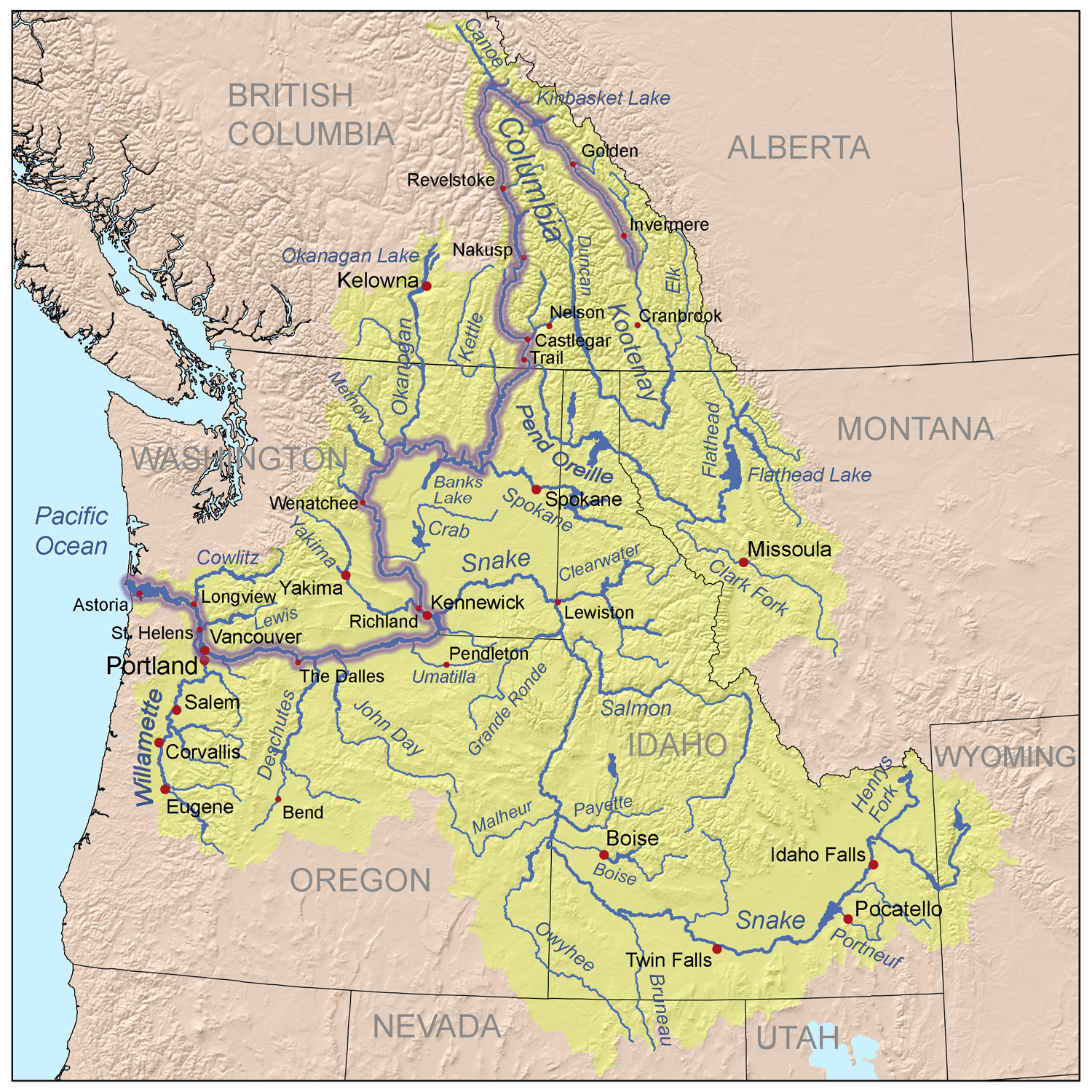
The Columbia Basin of the Pacific Northwest

The Dam Cup is an American college football rivalry in the Pacific Northwest between the Eastern Washington Eagles and the Portland State Vikings. Both are members of the Big Sky Conference in the Football Championship Subdivision of NCAA Division I.

The Dam Cup began in 2010 as a multi-sport competition between the two schools. It refers to the Columbia River watershed and its dams in a double entendre. The EWU campus is upstream in Cheney, southwest of Spokane, while Portland is the major city on the river.

The football teams first played 58 years ago in 1968 and have been conference rivals in the Big Sky since Portland State joined in 1996. They had met 32 times prior to the establishment of the cup; since then, Eastern Washington has won ten of fifteen (.667) The overall series is tied at 23–23–1 (.500).

== Game results ==
Eastern Washington victories	Portland State victories

No.	Date	Location	Winner	Score
1	October 19, 1968	Cheney, WA	Portland State	19–13
2	September 27, 1969	Portland, OR	Portland State	35–0
3	November 21, 1970	Cheney, WA	Portland State	34–0
4	November 13, 1971	Portland, OR	Portland State	13–6
5	October 21, 1972	Portland, OR	Eastern Washington	14–7
6	October 27, 1973	Cheney, WA	Eastern Washington	3–0
7	September 21, 1974	Portland, OR	Portland State	56–18
8	September 27, 1975	Cheney, WA	Portland State	51–0
9	October 18, 1980	Portland, OR	Portland State	54–21
10	October 9, 1982	Spokane, WA	Eastern Washington	36–0
11	November 19, 1983	Portland, OR	Eastern Washington	6–0
12	September 3, 1988	Spokane, WA	Tie	31–31
13	October 27, 1990	Portland, OR	Eastern Washington	21–13
14	October 12, 1991	Cheney, WA	Portland State	35–23
15	September 12, 1992	Portland, OR	Portland State	24–21
16	October 9, 1993	Cheney, WA	Eastern Washington	38–21
17	October 1, 1994	Portland, OR	Portland State	31–21
18	September 23, 1995	Cheney, WA	Portland State	14–6
19	September 26, 1996	Cheney, WA	Eastern Washington	24–7
20	September 20, 1997	Portland, OR	#21 Eastern Washington	31–14
21	September 12, 1998	Cheney, WA	Portland State	30–27
22	September 16, 1999	Portland, OR	Portland State	48–39
23	November 11, 2000	Portland, OR	Eastern Washington	27–24
24	November 10, 2001	Cheney, WA	Portland State	37–22

No.	Date	Location	Winner	Score
25	October 12, 2002	Portland, OR	#14 Portland State	34–31
26	October 11, 2003	Cheney, WA	Eastern Washington	42–16
27	October 2, 2004	Portland, OR	Eastern Washington	41–21
28	October 1, 2005	Cheney, WA	#14 Eastern Washington	42–24
29	October 21, 2006	Portland, OR	Portland State	34–0
30	September 29, 2007	Cheney, WA	Portland State	28–21
31	October 4, 2008	Portland, OR	Portland State	47–36
32	October 31, 2009	Seattle, WA	#16 Eastern Washington	47–10
33	October 30, 2010	Portland, OR	#8 Eastern Washington	50–17
34	October 29, 2011	Cheney, WA	Portland State	43–26
35	November 17, 2012	Portland, OR	#5 Eastern Washington	41–34
36	November 23, 2013	Cheney, WA	#3 Eastern Washington	42–41
37	November 21, 2014	Portland, OR	#5 Eastern Washington	56–34
38	November 21, 2015	Cheney, WA	#11 Portland State	34–31
39	November 18, 2016	Portland, OR	#3 Eastern Washington	35–28
40	November 18, 2017	Cheney, WA	#18 Eastern Washington	59–33
41	November 16, 2018	Hillsboro, OR	#4 Eastern Washington	74–23
42	November 23, 2019	Cheney, WA	Eastern Washington	53–46
43	November 20, 2021	Hillsboro, OR	#5 Eastern Washington	42–28
44	October 29, 2022	Cheney, WA	Portland State	38–35
45	October 28, 2023	Hillsboro, OR	Portland State	47–35
46	October 4, 2025	Cheney, WA	Eastern Washington	35–27
47	November 21, 2026	Cheney, WA	Portland State	40–38
Series: Tied 23–23–1

- Only tie was in 1988; the Big Sky enacted overtime for conference games in 1980, and all Division I games went to overtime in 1996.

== See also ==
- List of NCAA college football rivalry games
