= 2007 NCAA Division I FCS football rankings =

The following weekly polls comprise the 2007 NCAA Division I FCS football rankings that determined the top 25 teams at the NCAA Division I Football Championship Subdivision level of college football for the 2007 season. The Sports Network poll is voted by media members while the Coaches' Poll is determined by coaches at the FCS level.

== Legend ==
	Increase in ranking
	Decrease in ranking
	Not ranked previous week
(#–#)	Win–loss record
(Italics)	Number of first place votes
т	Tied with team above or below also with this symbol

== The Sports Network poll ==
	Preseason	Week 1 Sept 4	Week 2 Sept 11	Week 3 Sept 18	Week 4 Sept 25	Week 5 Oct 2	Week 6 Oct 9	Week 7 Oct 16	Week 8 Oct 23	Week 9 Oct 30	Week 10 Nov 6	Week 11 Nov 13	Week 12 Nov 20	Week 13 Postseason	
1.	Appalachian State (67)	Appalachian State (1–0) (88)	Appalachian State (2–0) (77)	Appalachian State (3–0) (90)	Montana (3–0) (46)	Montana (4–0) (52)	Montana (5–0) (55)	Northern Iowa (6–0) (35)	Northern Iowa (7–0) (56)	Northern Iowa (8–0) (59)	Northern Iowa (9–0) (61)	Northern Iowa (10–0) (70)	Northern Iowa (11–0) (97)	Appalachian State (13–2) (119)	1.
2.	Montana (3)	UMass (1–0)	Montana (2–0)	Montana (2–0)	UMass (4–0) (18)	Northern Iowa (5–0) (23)	Northern Iowa (5–0) (29)	North Dakota State (6–0) (23)	North Dakota State (7–0) (47)	North Dakota State (8–0) (37)	North Dakota State (9–0) (42)	North Dakota State (10–0) (23)	Montana (11–0) (10)	Delaware (11–4)	2.
3.	UMass (Note: In the actual printed polls, UMass was listed as Massachusetts)	Montana (1–0)	UMass (2–0)	UMass (3–0)	Northern Iowa (4–0) (12)	North Dakota State (4–0) (19)	North Dakota State (5–0) (24)	Montana (6–0) (40)	Montana (7–0) (11)	UMass (7–1) (6)	Montana (9–0) (7)	Montana (10–0) (10)	McNeese State (11–0) (5)	Southern Illinois (12–2)	3.
4.	North Dakota State	North Dakota State (0–0)	Northern Iowa (2–0)	North Dakota State (2–0)	North Dakota State (3–0) (14)	UMass (4–1) (11)	UMass (4–1) (5)	UMass (5–1) (4)	UMass (6–1) (4)	Montana (8–0) (7)	McNeese State (9–0) (2)	McNeese State (10–0) (3)	Southern Illinois (10–1)	Northern Iowa (12–1)	4.
5.	Youngstown State	New Hampshire (0–0)	North Dakota State (1–0)	Northern Iowa (3–0)	Appalachian State (3–1) (8)	Appalachian State (4–1) (2)	Appalachian State (5–1) (2)	Appalachian State (5–1) (3)	McNeese State (7–0) (2)	McNeese State (8–0) (3)	Southern Illinois (8–1)	Southern Illinois (9–1)	Appalachian State (9–2)	Richmond (11–3)	5.
6.	New Hampshire (1)	Youngstown State (0–1)	Youngstown State (1–1)	McNeese State (2–0)	McNeese State (3–0) (2)	McNeese State (4–0) (7)	McNeese State (5–0) (2)	McNeese State (6–0) (2)	James Madison (6–1)	Southern Illinois (7–1)	Delaware (8–1)	Appalachian State (8–2)	Richmond (9–2)	Wofford (9–4)	6.
7.	Illinois State	McNeese State (1–0)	Southern Illinois (2–0)	Southern Illinois (3–0)	Southern Illinois (4–0) (1)	Southern Illinois (5–0) (2)	Southern Illinois (6–0) (1)	Wofford (6–1) (3)	Southern Illinois (7–1)	Delaware (7–1)	Appalachian State (7–2)	Richmond (8–2)	UMass (9–2)	UMass (10–3)	7.
8.	James Madison	Northern Iowa (1–0)	McNeese State (1–0)	James Madison (2–1)	Wofford (3–1) (2)	Wofford (4–1) (3)	Wofford (5–1) (3)	James Madison (6–1)	New Hampshire (5–2)	New Hampshire (6–2)	UMass (7–2)	UMass (8–2)	North Dakota State (10–1) (1)	Eastern Washington (9–4)	8.
9.	Northern Iowa	Furman (1–0)	James Madison (1–1)	Youngstown State (2–1)	James Madison (3–1)	James Madison (4–1)	James Madison (5–1)	Southern Illinois (6–1)	Delaware (6–1)	Appalachian State (6–2)	Richmond (7–2)	Delaware (8–2)	Eastern Kentucky (9–2)	North Dakota State (10–1)	9.
10.	McNeese State	James Madison (0–1)	Delaware (2–0)	New Hampshire (1–1)	Youngstown State (3–1)	Youngstown State (4–1)	Hofstra (5–0)	Hofstra (6–0)	Appalachian State (5–2)	Wofford (7–2)	Delaware State (8–1)	Delaware State (9–1)	Delaware State (10–1)	Montana (11–1)	10.
11.	Furman	Southern Illinois (1–0)	Wofford (2–0)	Delaware (3–0)	New Hampshire (2–1)	Delaware (5–0)	Montana State (4–1)	New Hampshire (4–2)	Wofford (6–2)	Richmond (6–2)	Georgia Southern (7–2)	Yale (9–0)	Wofford (8–3)	McNeese State (11–1)	11.
12.	Southern Illinois	Eastern Illinois (1–0)	New Hampshire (0–1)	Hampton (2–0)	Delaware (4–0)	Hofstra (4–0)	Youngstown State (4–2)	Youngstown State (5–2)	Delaware State (6–1)	James Madison (6–2)	Yale (8–0)	Eastern Kentucky (8–2)	James Madison (8–3)	James Madison (8–4)	12.
13.	Portland State	Delaware (1–0)	Hampton (1–0)	Wofford (2–1)	Hampton (3–0)	Montana State (3–1)	New Hampshire (3–2)	Nicholls State (5–1)	Yale (6–0)	Delaware State (7–1)	Eastern Kentucky (7–2)	Wofford (8–3)	Delaware (8–3)	Eastern Kentucky (9–3)	13.
14.	Wofford	Wofford (1–0)	Eastern Illinois (1–1)	Illinois State (2–1)	Hofstra (3–0)	Richmond (3–1)	Nicholls State (4–1)	Delaware (6–1)	Richmond (5–2)	Elon (6–2)	New Hampshire (6–3)	James Madison (7–3)	Eastern Washington (8–3)	New Hampshire (7–5)	14.
15.	Cal Poly (Note: In the actual printed polls, Cal Poly was sometimes listed as Cal Poly San Luis Obispo)	Hampton (0–0)	Furman (1–1)	Hofstra (2–0)	Sam Houston State (2–1)	New Hampshire (2–2)	Delaware (5–1)	Delaware State (5–1)	Hofstra (6–1)	Yale (7–0)	Wofford (7–3)	Eastern Washington (7–3)	Youngstown State (7–4)	Delaware State (10–2)	15.
16.	Hampton	Sam Houston State (1–0)	Sam Houston State (2–0)	Furman (1–2)	Illinois State (2–2)	Eastern Illinois (3–2)	Yale (4–0)	Yale (5–0)	Elon (5–2)	Eastern Kentucky (7–2)	James Madison (6–3)	Georgia Southern (7–3)	Grambling State (8–2)	Youngstown State (7–4)	16.
17.	Eastern Illinois	Illinois State (0–1)	Illinois State (1–1)	Sam Houston State (2–1)	Western Illinois (3–1)	Nicholls State (3–1)	Delaware State (4–1)	Western Illinois (5–2)	Eastern Kentucky (6–2)	Georgia Southern (6–2)	Grambling State (8–1)	Youngstown State (7–4)	New Hampshire (7–4)	Georgia Southern (7–4)	17.
18.	Sam Houston State	Portland State (0–1)	Nicholls State (2–0)	Montana State (1–1)	Montana State (2–1)	Yale (3–0)	Hampton (4–1)	Richmond (4–2)	Nicholls State (5–2)	Grambling State (7–1)	Hofstra (7–2)	Fordham (8–2)	Eastern Illinois (8–3)	Eastern Illinois (8–4)	18.
19.	Delaware	Texas State (1–0)	Hofstra (1–0)	Western Illinois (2–1)	Eastern Illinois (2–2)	Sam Houston State (2–2)	Western Illinois (4–2)	Cal Poly (4–2)	Montana State (5–2)	Western Illinois (6–3)	Elon (6–3)	Grambling State (8–2)	Georgia Southern (7–4)	South Dakota State (7–4)	19.
20.	South Dakota State	Tennessee–Martin (0–1)	Montana State (0–1)	Eastern Illinois (1–2)	Furman (1–2)	Delaware State (3–1)	Richmond (3–2)	Montana State (4–2)	Youngstown State (5–3)	Hofstra (6–2)	Eastern Washington (6–3)	New Hampshire (6–4)	Yale (9–1)	Fordham (8–4)	20.
21.	Montana State	Montana State (0–1)	Yale (0–0)	Yale (1–0)	Eastern Washington (3–0)	Hampton (3–1)	Georgia Southern (4–1)	Eastern Kentucky (5–2)	Grambling State (6–1)	Alabama A&M (7–1)	Youngstown State (6–4)	Eastern Illinois (7–3)	South Dakota State (7–4)	Harvard (8–2)	21.
22.	Tennessee–Martin	Cal Poly (0–1)	Western Illinois (1–1)	Lafayette (3–0)	Yale (2–0)	Western Illinois (3–2)	Cal Poly (3–2)	Eastern Washington (4–2)	Georgia Southern (5–2)	Youngstown State (5–4)	Fordham (8–2)	Hofstra (7–3)	Harvard (8–2)	Yale (9–1)	22.
23.	Coastal Carolina	Yale (0–0)	Towson State (2–0)	Alabama A&M (3–0)	Nicholls State (3–1)	Illinois State (2–3)	Eastern Kentucky (4–2)	Grambling State (5–1)	Norfolk State (6–1)	Villanova (5–3)	Western Illinois (6–4)	Alabama A&M (8–2)	Elon (7–4)	Elon (7–4)	23.
24.	Yale	Western Illinois (1–0)	Delaware State (2–0)	Cal Poly (1–2)	Elon (2–1)	Cal Poly (3–2)	Eastern Illinois (3–3)	Elon (4–2)	Western Illinois (5–3)	Eastern Washington (5–3)	Cal Poly (6–3)	Elon (6–4)	Cal Poly (7–4)	Cal Poly (7–4)	24.
25.	South Carolina State	Nicholls State (1–0)	Lafayette (2–0)	Eastern Washington (2–0)	Richmond (2–1)	Southern U. (5–0)	Grambling State (4–1)	Norfolk State (5–1)	The Citadel (5–2)	Nicholls State (5–3)	Eastern Illinois (6–3)	Cal Poly (6–4)	Fordham (8–3)	Grambling State (8–4)	25.
	Preseason	Week 1 Sept 4	Week 2 Sept 11	Week 3 Sept 18	Week 4 Sept 25	Week 5 Oct 2	Week 6 Oct 9	Week 7 Oct 16	Week 8 Oct 23	Week 9 Oct 30	Week 10 Nov 6	Week 11 Nov 13	Week 12 Nov 20	Week 13 Postseason	
		Dropped: 20 South Dakota State; 23 Coastal Carolina; 25 South Carolina State	Dropped: 18 Portland State; 19 Texas State; 20 Tennessee–Martin; 22 Cal Poly	Dropped: 18 Nicholls State; 23 Towson State; 24 Delaware State	Dropped: 22 Lafayette; 23 Alabama A&M; 24 Cal Poly	Dropped: 20 Furman; 21 Eastern Washington; 24 Elon	Dropped: 19 Sam Houston State; 23 Illinois State; 25 Southern U.	Dropped: 18 Hampton; 21 Georgia Southern; 24 Eastern Illinois	Dropped: 19 Cal Poly; 22 Eastern Washington	Dropped: 19 Montana State; 23 Norfolk State; 25 The Citadel	Dropped: 21 Alabama A&M; 23 Villanova; 25 Nicholls State	Dropped: 23 Western Illinois	Dropped: 22 Hofstra; 23 Alabama A&M	None	

== Coaches' Poll ==
	Preseason	Week 1 Sept 4	Week 2 Sept 11	Week 3 Sept 18	Week 4 Sept 25	Week 5 Oct 2	Week 6 Oct 9	Week 7 Oct 16	Week 8 Oct 23	Week 9 Oct 30	Week 10 Nov 6	Week 11 Nov 13	Week 12 Nov 20	Week 13 Postseason	
1.	Appalachian State (27)	Appalachian State (1–0) (28)	Appalachian State (2–0) (28)	Appalachian State (3–0) (28)	Montana (3–0) (20)	Montana (4–0) (18)	North Dakota State (5–0) (8)	North Dakota State (6–0)	North Dakota State (7–0) (21)	North Dakota State (8–0) (16)	North Dakota State (9–0) (18)	North Dakota State (10–0) (17)	Northern Iowa (11–0) (17)	Appalachian State (13–2) (27)	1.
2.	Montana	Montana (1–0)	UMass (2–0)	Montana (2–0)	UMass (4–0) (4)	North Dakota State (4–0) (4)	Montana (5–0) (15)	Northern Iowa (6–0)	Northern Iowa (7–0) (2)	Northern Iowa (8–0) (6)	Northern Iowa (9–0) (6)	Northern Iowa (10–0) (7)	Montana (11–0) (7)	Delaware (11–4)	2.
3.	UMass (1)	UMass (1–0)	Montana (2–0)	UMass (3–0)	North Dakota State (3–0) (3)	UMass (4–1) (5)	Northern Iowa (5–0)	Montana (6–0)	Montana (7–0) (4)	Montana (8–0) (4)	Montana (9–0) (4)	Montana (10–0) (4)	McNeese State (11–0) (1)	Southern Illinois (12–2)	3.
4.	North Dakota State	North Dakota State (0–0)	North Dakota State (1–0)	North Dakota State (2–0)	Northern Iowa (4–0)	Northern Iowa (5–0)	UMass (4–1) (4)	UMass (5–1)	UMass (6–1) (1)	UMass (7–1) (2)	McNeese State (9–0)	McNeese State (10–0)	Southern Illinois (10–1)	Richmond (11–3)	4.
5.	New Hampshire	New Hampshire (0–0)	Northern Iowa (2–0)	Northern Iowa (3–0)	Appalachian State (3–1)	Appalachian State (4–1)	Appalachian State (5–1)	Appalachian State (5–1)	McNeese State (7–0)	McNeese State (8–0)	Southern Illinois (8–1)	Southern Illinois (9–1)	North Dakota State (10–1) (3)	Northern Iowa (12–1) (1)	5.
6.	Youngstown State	McNeese State (1–0)	Southern Illinois (2–0)	Southern Illinois (3–0)	Southern Illinois (4–0)	Southern Illinois (5–0)	Southern Illinois (6–0)	McNeese State (6–0)	James Madison (6–1)	Southern Illinois (7–1)	Delaware (8–1)	Appalachian State (8–2)	Appalachian State (9–2)	UMass (10–3)	6.
7.	James Madison	Northern Iowa (1–0)	James Madison (1–1)	Youngstown State (2–1)	McNeese State (3–0) (1)	McNeese State (4–0) (1)	McNeese State (5–0) (1)	Wofford (6–1)	Southern Illinois (7–1)	Delaware (7–1)	Appalachian State (7–2)	UMass (8–2)	UMass (9–2)	James Madison (8–4)	7.
8.	Illinois State	Youngstown State (0–1)	Youngstown State (1–1)	McNeese State (2–0)	Wofford (3–1)	Wofford (4–1)	Wofford (5–1)	James Madison (6–1)	Delaware (6–1)	New Hampshire (6–2)	Richmond (7–2)	Richmond (8–2)	Richmond (9–2)	Eastern Washington (9–4)	8.
9.	Northern Iowa	Furman (1–0)	McNeese State (1–0)	James Madison (2–1)	James Madison (3–1)	James Madison (4–1)	James Madison (5–1)	Hofstra (6–0)	New Hampshire (5–2)	Appalachian State (6–2)	UMass (7–2)	Delaware (8–2)	James Madison (8–3)	North Dakota State (10–1)	9.
10.	Furman	Southern Illinois (1–0)	Wofford (2–0)	New Hampshire (1–1)	Youngstown State (3–1)	Youngstown State (4–1)	Hofstra (5–0)	Southern Illinois (6–1)	Appalachian State (5–2)	Wofford (7–2)	Delaware State (8–1)	Delaware State (9–1)	Delaware State (10–1)	Wofford (9–4)	10.
11.	Southern Illinois	James Madison (0–1)	Delaware (2–0)	Delaware (3–0)	New Hampshire (2–1)	Delaware (5–0)	New Hampshire (3–2)	New Hampshire (4–2)	Wofford (6–2)	Richmond (6–2)	Georgia Southern (7–2)	Yale (9–0)	Eastern Kentucky (9–2)	McNeese State (11–1)	11.
12.	McNeese State	Wofford (1–0)	New Hampshire (0–1)	Wofford (2–1)	Delaware (4–0)	Hofstra (4–0)	Montana State (4–1)	Youngstown State (5–2)	Delaware State (6–1)	James Madison (6–2)	Yale (8–0)	Eastern Kentucky (8–2)	Wofford (8–3)	Montana (11–1)	12.
13.	Portland State	Delaware (1–0)	Hampton (1–0)	Hampton (2–0)	Hampton (3–0)	Montana State (3–1)	Youngstown State (4–2)	Delaware (6–1)	Yale (6–0)	Delaware State (7–1)	Eastern Kentucky (7–2)	James Madison (7–3)	Delaware (8–3)	Eastern Kentucky (9–3)	13.
14.	Cal Poly	Eastern Illinois (1–0)	Sam Houston State (2–0)	Illinois State (2–1)	Hofstra (3–0)	New Hampshire (2–2)	Nicholls State (4–1)	Nicholls State (5–1)	Richmond (5–2)	Yale (7–0)	New Hampshire (6–3)	Wofford (8–3)	Eastern Washington (8–3)	New Hampshire (7–5)	14.
15.	Wofford	Hampton (0–0)	Illinois State (1–1)	Sam Houston State (2–1)	Sam Houston State (2–1)	Richmond (3–1)	Delaware (5–1)	Yale (5–0)	Hofstra (6–1)	Elon (6–2)	James Madison (6–3)	Eastern Washington (7–3)	New Hampshire (7–4)	Eastern Illinois (8–4)	15.
16.	Hampton	Sam Houston State (1–0)	Furman (1–1)	Hofstra (2–0)	Illinois State (2–2)	Eastern Illinois (3–2)	Yale (4–0)	Delaware State (5–1)	Montana State (5–2)	Eastern Kentucky (7–2)	Grambling State (8–1)	Youngstown State (7–4)	Youngstown State (7–4)	Delaware State (10–2)	16.
17.	Eastern Illinois	Cal Poly (0–1)	Eastern Illinois (1–1)	Furman (1–2)	Montana State (2–1)	Yale (3–0)	Delaware State (4–1)	Western Illinois (5–2)	Elon (5–2)	Grambling State (7–1)	Wofford (7–3)	Georgia Southern (7–3)	Eastern Illinois (8–3)	Youngstown State (7–4)	17.
18.	Tennessee–Martin	Illinois State (0–1)	Nicholls State (2–0)	Montana State (1–1)	Western Illinois (3–1)	Nicholls State (3–1)	Hampton (4–1)	Richmond (4–2)	Eastern Kentucky (6–2)	Georgia Southern (6–2)	Hofstra (7–2)	Grambling State (8–2)	Grambling State (8–2)	Georgia Southern (7–4)	18.
19.	South Dakota State	Portland State (0–1)	Montana State (0–1)	Western Illinois (2–1)	Furman (1–2)	Sam Houston State (2–2)	Western Illinois (4–2)	Montana State (4–2)	Nicholls State (5–2)	Western Illinois (6–3)	Elon (6–3)	New Hampshire (6–4)	Georgia Southern (7–4)	Fordham (8–4)	19.
20.	Coastal Carolina	Montana State (0–1)	Hofstra (1–0)	Nicholls State (2–1)	Yale (2–0)	Hampton (3–1)	Richmond (3–2)	Cal Poly (4–2)	Youngstown State (5–3)	Hofstra (6–2)	Youngstown State (6–4)	Eastern Illinois (7–3)	Yale (9–1)	Harvard (8–2)	20.
21.	Delaware	Texas State (1–0)	Cal Poly (0–2)	Yale (1–0)	Eastern Illinois (2–2)	Delaware State (3–1)	Georgia Southern (4–1)	Eastern Kentucky (5–2)	Grambling State (6–1)	Eastern Illinois (6–3)	Eastern Washington (6–3)	Fordham (8–2)	Elon (7–4)	Yale (9–1)	21.
22.	Montana State	Tennessee–Martin (0–1)	Western Illinois (1–1)	Eastern Illinois (1–2)	Nicholls State (3–1)	Illinois State (2–3)	Cal Poly (3–2)	Eastern Washington (4–2)	Georgia Southern (5–2)	Alabama A&M (7–1)	Eastern Illinois (6–3)	Hofstra (7–3)	Harvard (8–2)	South Dakota State (7–4)	22.
23.	Sam Houston State	Western Illinois (1–0)	Yale (0–0)	Lafayette (3–0)	Eastern Washington (3–0)	Western Illinois (3–2)	Eastern Illinois (3–3)	Grambling State (5–1)	Norfolk State (6–1)	Youngstown State (5–4)	Fordham (8–2)	Alabama A&M (8–2)	Fordham (8–3)	Elon (7–4)	23.
24.	Yale	Yale (0–0)	Delaware State (2–0)	Cal Poly (1–2)	Cal Poly (2–2)	Cal Poly (3–2)	Lafayette (4–1)	Eastern Illinois (4–3)	San Diego (7–0)	Nicholls State (5–3)	Western Illinois (6–4)	Dayton (10–1)	Dayton (10–1)	Grambling State (8–4)	24.
25.	Princeton	Nicholls State (1–0)	Alabama A&M (2–0)	Alabama A&M (3–0)	Richmond (2–1)	The Citadel (3–1)	Grambling State (4–1)	Hampton (4–1) т	Eastern Illinois (5–3)	Villanova (5–3)	Dayton (5–4) т	Harvard (7–2)	South Dakota State (7–4)	Dayton (11–1)	25.
26.								San Diego (6–0) т			Norfolk State (7–2) т				26.
	Preseason	Week 1 Sept 4	Week 2 Sept 11	Week 3 Sept 18	Week 4 Sept 25	Week 5 Oct 2	Week 6 Oct 9	Week 7 Oct 16	Week 8 Oct 23	Week 9 Oct 30	Week 10 Nov 6	Week 11 Nov 13	Week 12 Nov 20	Week 13 Postseason	
		Dropped: 19 South Dakota State; 20 Coastal Carolina; 25 Princeton	Dropped: 19 Portland State; 21 Texas State; 22 Tennessee–Martin	Dropped: 24 Delaware State	Dropped: 23 Lafayette; 25 Alabama A&M	Dropped: 19 Furman; 23 Eastern Washington	Dropped: 19 Sam Houston State; 22 Illinois State; 25 The Citadel	Dropped: 21 Georgia Southern; 24 Lafayette	Dropped: 17 Western Illinois; 20 Cal Poly; 22 Eastern Washington; 25 Hampton	Dropped: 16 Montana State; 23 Norfolk State; 24 San Diego	Dropped: 22 Alabama A&M; 24 Nicholls State; 25 Villanova	Dropped: 19 Elon; 24 Western Illinois; 25 Norfolk State	Dropped: 22 Hofstra; 23 Alabama A&M	None	
