= List of Southland Conference football standings =

This is a list of yearly Southland Conference football standings. From 1996 to 2002, for football only, the Southland Conference was known as the Southland Football League.

== Southland Conference standings ==
1964 Southland Conference football standings
	Conf.					Overall
Team	W		L		T	W		L		T
Lamar Tech $	3	–	0	–	1	6	–	3	–	1
Arkansas State	2	–	0	–	2	7	–	0	–	2
Trinity (TX)	2	–	2	–	0	3	–	7	–	0
Abilene Christian	1	–	3	–	0	5	–	5	–	0
Arlington State	0	–	3	–	1	3	–	6	–	1
$ – Conference champion

1965 Southland Conference football standings
	Conf.					Overall
Team	W		L		T	W		L		T
Lamar Tech $	3	–	1	–	0	6	–	4	–	0
Arlington State	2	–	2	–	0	6	–	3	–	0
Trinity (TX)	2	–	2	–	0	4	–	5	–	1
Abilene Christian	2	–	2	–	0	4	–	5	–	0
Arkansas State	1	–	3	–	0	6	–	3	–	0
$ – Conference champion

1966 Southland Conference football standings
	Conf.					Overall
Team	W		L		T	W		L		T
Arlington State +	3	–	1	–	0	6	–	4	–	0
Lamar Tech +	3	–	1	–	0	6	–	4	–	0
No. 6 Arkansas State	2	–	2	–	0	7	–	2	–	0
Trinity (TX)	2	–	2	–	0	5	–	4	–	0
Abilene Christian	0	–	4	–	0	4	–	6	–	0
+ – Conference co-champions; Rankings from AP small college poll

1967 Southland Conference football standings
	Conf.					Overall
Team	W		L		T	W		L		T
No. 6 UT Arlington $	4	–	0	–	0	10	–	1	–	0
Lamar Tech	3	–	1	–	0	7	–	3	–	0
Arkansas State	2	–	2	–	0	4	–	5	–	0
Trinity (TX)	1	–	3	–	0	3	–	7	–	0
Abilene Christian	0	–	4	–	0	3	–	6	–	0
$ – Conference champion; Rankings from AP small college poll

1968 Southland Conference football standings
	Conf.					Overall
Team	W		L		T	W		L		T
No. 15 Arkansas State $	3	–	0	–	1	7	–	3	–	1
UT Arlington	3	–	1	–	0	6	–	4	–	0
Trinity (TX)	2	–	2	–	0	5	–	4	–	0
Abilene Christian	1	–	2	–	1	4	–	5	–	1
Lamar Tech	0	–	4	–	0	0	–	10	–	0
$ – Conference champion; Rankings from AP small college poll

1969 Southland Conference football standings
	Conf.					Overall
Team	W		L		T	W		L		T
No. 7 Arkansas State $	4	–	0	–	0	8	–	1	–	1
Abilene Christian	2	–	2	–	0	8	–	2	–	0
UT Arlington	2	–	2	–	0	5	–	5	–	0
Trinity (TX)	2	–	2	–	0	4	–	6	–	0
Lamar Tech	0	–	4	–	0	3	–	7	–	0
$ – Conference champion; Rankings from AP small college poll

1970 Southland Conference football standings
	Conf.					Overall
Team	W		L		T	W		L		T
No. 1 Arkansas State $	4	–	0	–	0	11	–	0	–	0
No. 14 Abilene Christian	3	–	1	–	0	9	–	2	–	0
Trinity (TX)	2	–	2	–	0	5	–	6	–	0
Lamar Tech	1	–	3	–	0	3	–	7	–	0
UT Arlington	0	–	4	–	0	0	–	10	–	0
$ – Conference champion; Rankings from AP small college poll

1971 Southland Conference football standings
	Conf.					Overall
Team	W		L		T	W		L		T
No. 4 Louisiana Tech +	4	–	1	–	0	9	–	2	–	0
Trinity (TX) +	4	–	1	–	0	8	–	2	–	0
Lamar +	4	–	1	–	0	5	–	6	–	0
SW Louisiana	2	–	2	–	1	5	–	4	–	1
Arkansas State	1	–	3	–	1	4	–	4	–	1
UT Arlington	1	–	4	–	0	2	–	9	–	0
Abilene Christian	0	–	4	–	0	5	–	5	–	0
$ – Conference champion; Rankings from AP small college poll

1972 Southland Conference football standings
	Conf.					Overall
Team	W		L		T	W		L		T
No. 2 Louisiana Tech $	5	–	0	–	0	12	–	0	–	0
UT Arlington	4	–	1	–	0	5	–	6	–	0
No. T–10 McNeese State	3	–	2	–	0	8	–	3	–	0
Lamar	3	–	2	–	0	8	–	3	–	0
SW Louisiana	1	–	4	–	0	5	–	6	–	0
Arkansas State	1	–	4	–	0	4	–	7	–	0
Abilene Christian	1	–	5	–	0	3	–	8	–	0
$ – Conference champion; Rankings from AP small college poll

1973 Southland Conference football standings
	Conf.					Overall
Team	W		L		T	W		L		T
No. 2 Louisiana Tech $^	5	–	0	–	0	12	–	1	–	0
Arkansas State	3	–	2	–	0	7	–	3	–	0
Lamar	3	–	2	–	0	5	–	5	–	0
McNeese State	2	–	3	–	0	7	–	3	–	1
UT Arlington	2	–	3	–	0	4	–	6	–	0
SW Louisiana	0	–	5	–	0	0	–	10	–	0
$ – Conference champion; ^ – NCAA Division II playoff participant; Rankings from AP small college poll

1974 Southland Conference football standings
	Conf.					Overall
Team	W		L		T	W		L		T
No. 2 Louisiana Tech $^	5	–	0	–	0	11	–	1	–	0
Lamar	4	–	1	–	0	8	–	2	–	0
Arkansas State	3	–	2	–	0	7	–	3	–	0
McNeese State	2	–	3	–	0	6	–	4	–	1
UT Arlington	1	–	4	–	0	1	–	10	–	0
SW Louisiana	0	–	5	–	0	2	–	9	–	0
$ – Conference champion; ^ – NCAA Division II playoff participant; Rankings from AP small college poll

1975 Southland Conference football standings
	Conf.					Overall
Team	W		L		T	W		L		T
Arkansas State $	5	–	0	–	0	11	–	0	–	0
Louisiana Tech	4	–	1	–	1	8	–	2	–	0
McNeese State	3	–	2	–	0	7	–	4	–	0
Southwestern Louisiana	2	–	3	–	0	6	–	5	–	0
UT Arlington	1	–	4	–	0	4	–	7	–	0
Lamar	0	–	5	–	0	1	–	10	–	0
$ – Conference champion

1976 Southland Conference football standings
	Conf.					Overall
Team	W		L		T	W		L		T
McNeese State $	4	–	1	–	0	10	–	2	–	0
Southwestern Louisiana	4	–	1	–	0	7	–	4	–	0
UT Arlington	3	–	2	–	0	5	–	6	–	0
Louisiana Tech	2	–	3	–	0	6	–	5	–	0
Arkansas State	2	–	3	–	0	5	–	6	–	0
Lamar	0	–	5	–	0	2	–	9	–	0
$ – Conference champion; Southwestern Louisiana forfeited 2 non-conference season wins.

1977 Southland Conference football standings
	Conf.					Overall
Team	W		L		T	W		L		T
Louisiana Tech $	4	–	0	–	1	9	–	1	–	2
Southwestern Louisiana	2	–	1	–	2	6	–	4	–	2
UT Arlington	3	–	2	–	0	5	–	6	–	0
Arkansas State	2	–	3	–	0	7	–	4	–	0
McNeese State	1	–	3	–	1	5	–	5	–	1
Lamar	1	–	4	–	0	2	–	9	–	0
$ – Conference champion

1978 Southland Conference football standings
	Conf.					Overall
Team	W		L		T	W		L		T
Louisiana Tech +	4	–	1	–	0	6	–	5	–	0
Arkansas State +	4	–	1	–	0	7	–	4	–	0
UT Arlington	3	–	2	–	0	5	–	6	–	0
McNeese State	2	–	3	–	0	7	–	4	–	0
Southwestern Louisiana	2	–	3	–	0	3	–	8	–	0
Lamar	0	–	5	–	0	2	–	8	–	1
+ – Conference co-champions

1979 Southland Conference football standings
	Conf.					Overall
Team	W		L		T	W		L		T
McNeese State $	5	–	0	–	0	11	–	1	–	0
UT Arlington	4	–	1	–	0	9	–	2	–	0
Lamar	3	–	2	–	0	6	–	3	–	2
Arkansas State	1	–	4	–	0	4	–	7	–	0
Southwestern Louisiana	1	–	4	–	0	4	–	7	–	0
Louisiana Tech	1	–	4	–	0	2	–	9	–	0
$ – Conference champion; Louisiana Tech record includes one win by forfeit.

1980 Southland Conference football standings
	Conf.					Overall
Team	W		L		T	W		L		T
McNeese State $	5	–	0	–	0	10	–	2	–	0
Southwestern Louisiana	4	–	1	–	0	7	–	4	–	0
UT Arlington	3	–	2	–	0	3	–	8	–	0
Louisiana Tech	2	–	3	–	0	5	–	6	–	0
Lamar	1	–	4	–	0	3	–	8	–	0
Arkansas State	0	–	5	–	0	2	–	9	–	0
$ – Conference champion

1981 Southland Conference football standings
	Conf.					Overall
Team	W		L		T	W		L		T
UT Arlington $	4	–	1	–	0	6	–	5	–	0
McNeese State	3	–	1	–	1	7	–	3	–	1
Arkansas State	3	–	2	–	0	6	–	5	–	0
Louisiana Tech	2	–	2	–	1	4	–	6	–	1
Lamar	1	–	3	–	1	4	–	6	–	1
Southwestern Louisiana	0	–	4	–	1	1	–	9	–	1
$ – Conference champion

1982 Southland Conference football standings
	Conf.					Overall
Team	W		L		T	W		L		T
No. 2 Louisiana Tech $^	5	–	0	–	0	10	–	3	–	0
No. 12 Northeast Louisiana	4	–	1	–	0	8	–	3	–	0
Arkansas State	2	–	3	–	0	5	–	6	–	0
McNeese State	2	–	3	–	0	4	–	6	–	1
Lamar	1	–	4	–	0	4	–	7	–	0
UT Arlington	1	–	4	–	0	3	–	8	–	0
North Texas State	0	–	0	–	0	2	–	9	–	0
$ – Conference champion; ^ – NCAA Division I-AA playoff participant; Rankings from NCAA Division I-AA Football Committee poll

1983 Southland Conference football standings
	Conf.					Overall
Team	W		L		T	W		L		T
No. 13 Northeast Louisiana +	5	–	1	–	0	8	–	3	–	0
No. 4 North Texas State +^	5	–	1	–	0	8	–	4	–	0
McNeese State	3	–	3	–	0	6	–	5	–	0
Arkansas State	3	–	3	–	0	5	–	5	–	1
UT Arlington	2	–	4	–	0	5	–	6	–	0
Louisiana Tech	2	–	4	–	0	4	–	7	–	0
Lamar	1	–	5	–	0	2	–	9	–	0
+ – Conference co-champions; ^ – NCAA Division I-AA playoff participant; Rankings from NCAA Division I-AA Football Committee poll

1984 Southland Conference football standings
	Conf.					Overall
Team	W		L		T	W		L		T
No. 9 Louisiana Tech $^	5	–	1	–	0	10	–	5	–	0
No. 10 Arkansas State ^	4	–	1	–	1	8	–	4	–	1
UT Arlington	4	–	2	–	0	7	–	4	–	0
Northeast Louisiana	3	–	3	–	0	7	–	4	–	0
No. 20 McNeese State	2	–	3	–	1	7	–	3	–	1
Lamar	1	–	5	–	0	2	–	9	–	0
North Texas State	1	–	5	–	0	2	–	9	–	0
$ – Conference champion; ^ – NCAA Division I-AA playoff participant; Rankings from NCAA Division I-AA Football Committee poll

1985 Southland Conference football standings
	Conf.					Overall
Team	W		L		T	W		L		T
No. 6 Arkansas State $^	5	–	1	–	0	9	–	4	–	0
No. 14 Louisiana Tech	4	–	2	–	0	8	–	3	–	0
McNeese State	3	–	1	–	2	6	–	3	–	2
Northeast Louisiana	3	–	3	–	0	6	–	5	–	0
North Texas State	2	–	3	–	1	4	–	6	–	1
UT Arlington	2	–	3	–	1	4	–	6	–	1
Lamar	0	–	6	–	0	2	–	9	–	0
$ – Conference champion; ^ – NCAA Division I-AA playoff participant; Rankings from NCAA Division I-AA Football Committee poll

1986 Southland Conference football standings
	Conf.					Overall
Team	W		L		T	W		L		T
No. 2 Arkansas State $^	5	–	0	–	0	12	–	2	–	1
North Texas State	3	–	2	–	0	6	–	4	–	0
Louisiana Tech	3	–	2	–	0	6	–	4	–	1
Northeast Louisiana	3	–	2	–	0	5	–	6	–	0
McNeese State	1	–	4	–	0	2	–	9	–	0
Lamar	0	–	5	–	0	2	–	9	–	0
$ – Conference champion; ^ – NCAA Division I-AA playoff participant; Rankings from NCAA Division I-AA Football Committee poll

1987 Southland Conference football standings
	Conf.					Overall
Team	W		L		T	W		L		T
No. 3 Northeast Louisiana $^	6	–	0	–	0	13	–	2	–	0
No. 19 Sam Houston State	5	–	1	–	0	8	–	3	–	0
No. 16 North Texas State ^	5	–	1	–	0	7	–	5	–	0
Northwestern State	3	–	3	–	0	6	–	5	–	0
SW Texas State	2	–	4	–	0	4	–	7	–	0
Stephen F. Austin	1	–	5	–	0	3	–	7	–	1
McNeese State	1	–	5	–	0	2	–	9	–	0
$ – Conference champion; ^ – NCAA Division I-AA playoff participant; Northeast Louisiana's games against Louisiana Tech and Arkansas State, Sam Houston State's games against Texas Southern and Western Illinois, Stephen F. Austin's game against Nicholls State, and McNeese State's game against Louisiana Tech counted in the conference standings.; Rankings from NCAA Division I-AA Football Committee poll

1988 Southland Conference football standings
	Conf.					Overall
Team	W		L		T	W		L		T
No. 8 Northwestern State $^	6	–	0	–	0	10	–	3	–	0
No. 9 Stephen F. Austin ^	5	–	1	–	0	10	–	3	–	0
No. 10 North Texas ^	4	–	2	–	0	8	–	4	–	0
McNeese State	3	–	3	–	0	6	–	5	–	0
Northeast Louisiana	2	–	4	–	0	5	–	6	–	0
SW Texas State	1	–	5	–	0	4	–	7	–	0
Sam Houston State	0	–	6	–	0	3	–	8	–	0
$ – Conference champion; ^ – NCAA Division I-AA playoff participant; Rankings from NCAA Division I-AA Football Committee poll

1989 Southland Conference football standings
	Conf.					Overall
Team	W		L		T	W		L		T
No. 3 Stephen F. Austin $^	5	–	0	–	1	12	–	2	–	1
Northwestern State	3	–	1	–	2	4	–	5	–	2
SW Texas State	3	–	3	–	0	5	–	6	–	0
Northeast Louisiana	2	–	3	–	1	4	–	6	–	1
McNeese State	2	–	4	–	0	5	–	6	–	0
North Texas	2	–	4	–	0	5	–	6	–	0
Sam Houston State	2	–	4	–	0	3	–	8	–	0
$ – Conference champion; ^ – NCAA Division I-AA playoff participant; Rankings from NCAA Division I-AA Football Committee poll

1990 Southland Conference football standings
	Conf.					Overall
Team	W		L		T	W		L		T
No. 14 Northeast Louisiana $^	5	–	1	–	0	7	–	5	–	0
McNeese State	4	–	2	–	0	5	–	6	–	0
Southwest Texas State	3	–	3	–	0	6	–	5	–	0
Northwestern State	3	–	3	–	0	5	–	6	–	0
Sam Houston State	3	–	3	–	0	4	–	7	–	0
North Texas	2	–	4	–	0	6	–	5	–	0
Stephen F. Austin	1	–	5	–	0	1	–	10	–	0
$ – Conference champion; ^ – NCAA Division I-AA playoff participant; Rankings from NCAA Division I-AA Football Committee poll

1991 Southland Conference football standings
	Conf.					Overall
Team	W		L		T	W		L		T
No. 12 Sam Houston State +^	5	–	2	–	0	8	–	3	–	1
No. 19 McNeese State +^	4	–	1	–	2	6	–	4	–	2
No. 18 NE Louisiana	4	–	2	–	1	7	–	3	–	1
SW Texas State	4	–	3	–	0	7	–	4	–	0
Northwestern State	4	–	3	–	0	6	–	5	–	0
Nicholls State	2	–	5	–	0	4	–	7	–	0
North Texas	2	–	5	–	0	3	–	7	–	1
Stephen F. Austin	1	–	5	–	1	2	–	8	–	1
+ – Conference co-champions; ^ – NCAA Division I-AA playoff participant; Rankings from NCAA Division I-AA Football Committee poll

1992 Southland Conference football standings
	Conf.					Overall
Team	W		L		T	W		L		T
No. 1 Northeast Louisiana $^	7	–	0	–	0	10	–	3	–	0
No. 11 McNeese State ^	6	–	1	–	0	9	–	4	–	0
Northwestern State	4	–	3	–	0	7	–	4	–	0
Sam Houston State	3	–	2	–	2	6	–	3	–	2
North Texas	3	–	4	–	0	4	–	7	–	0
Southwest Texas State	2	–	4	–	1	5	–	5	–	1
Stephen F. Austin	1	–	6	–	0	3	–	8	–	0
Nicholls State	0	–	6	–	1	1	–	9	–	1
$ – Conference champion; ^ – NCAA Division I-AA playoff participant; Rankings from NCAA Division I-AA Football Committee poll

1993 Southland Conference football standings
	Conf.					Overall
Team	W		L		T	W		L		T
No. 5 McNeese State $^	7	–	0	–	0	10	–	3	–	0
No. 4 NE Louisiana ^	6	–	1	–	0	9	–	3	–	0
No. 14 Stephen F. Austin ^	5	–	2	–	0	8	–	4	–	0
Northwestern State	3	–	4	–	0	5	–	6	–	0
Sam Houston State	2	–	5	–	0	4	–	7	–	0
North Texas	2	–	5	–	0	4	–	7	–	0
Nicholls State	2	–	5	–	0	3	–	8	–	0
SW Texas State	1	–	6	–	0	2	–	9	–	0
$ – Conference champion; ^ – NCAA Division I-AA playoff participant; Rankings from The Sports Network poll

1994 Southland Conference football standings
	Conf.					Overall
Team	W		L		T	W		L		T
No. 18 North Texas $^	5	–	0	–	1	7	–	4	–	1
No. 5 McNeese State ^	5	–	1	–	0	10	–	3	–	0
No. 21 Stephen F. Austin	4	–	1	–	1	6	–	3	–	2
Northwestern State	3	–	3	–	0	5	–	6	–	0
Sam Houston State	1	–	5	–	0	6	–	5	–	0
Nicholls State	1	–	5	–	0	5	–	6	–	0
Southwest Texas State	1	–	5	–	0	4	–	7	–	0
$ – Conference champion; ^ – NCAA Division I-AA playoff participant; Rankings from The Sports Network poll

1995 Southland Conference football standings
	Conf.					Overall
Team	W		L		T	W		L		T
No. 1 McNeese State $^	5	–	0	–	0	13	–	1	–	0
No. 5 Stephen F. Austin ^	4	–	1	–	0	11	–	2	–	0
Northwestern State	2	–	3	–	0	6	–	5	–	0
Sam Houston State	2	–	3	–	0	5	–	5	–	0
Southwest Texas State	2	–	3	–	0	4	–	7	–	0
Nicholls State	0	–	5	–	0	0	–	11	–	0
$ – Conference champion; ^ – NCAA Division I-AA playoff participant; Rankings from The Sports Network poll

1996 Southland Football League standings
	Conf.			Overall
Team	W		L	W		L
No. 5 Troy State $^	5	–	1	12	–	2
No. 19 Nicholls State ^	4	–	2	8	–	4
No. 22 Stephen F. Austin	3	–	3	7	–	4
Northwestern State	3	–	3	6	–	5
Sam Houston State	3	–	3	4	–	7
Southwest Texas State	2	–	4	5	–	6
McNeese State	1	–	5	3	–	8
$ – Conference champion; ^ – NCAA Division I-AA playoff participant; Rankings from The Sports Network poll

1997 Southland Football League standings
	Conf.			Overall
Team	W		L	W		L
No. 7 McNeese State +^	6	–	1	13	–	2
No. 21 Northwestern State +^	6	–	1	8	–	4
No. 13 Stephen F. Austin	5	–	2	8	–	3
Sam Houston State	3	–	4	5	–	6
Nicholls State	3	–	4	5	–	6
Southwest Texas State	2	–	5	5	–	6
Troy State	2	–	5	5	–	6
Jacksonville State	1	–	6	1	–	10
+ – Conference co-champions; ^ – NCAA Division I-AA playoff participant; Rankings from The Sports Network poll

1998 Southland Football League standings
	Conf.			Overall
Team	W		L	W		L
No. 3 Northwestern State $^	6	–	1	11	–	3
No. 8 McNeese State ^	5	–	2	9	–	3
No. 13 Troy State ^	5	–	2	8	–	4
Jacksonville State	4	–	3	7	–	4
Nicholls State	3	–	4	4	–	7
Southwest Texas State	2	–	5	4	–	7
Stephen F. Austin	2	–	5	3	–	8
Sam Houston State	1	–	6	3	–	8
$ – Conference champion; ^ – NCAA Division I-AA playoff participant; Rankings from The Sports Network poll

1999 Southland Football League standings
	Conf.			Overall
Team	W		L	W		L
No. 6 Troy State +^	6	–	1	11	–	2
No. 22 Stephen F. Austin +	6	–	1	8	–	3
McNeese State	5	–	2	6	–	5
Sam Houston State	4	–	3	6	–	5
Northwestern State	3	–	4	4	–	7
Southwest Texas State	2	–	5	3	–	8
Jacksonville State	1	–	6	2	–	9
Nicholls State	1	–	6	1	–	10
+ – Conference co-champions; ^ – NCAA Division I-AA playoff participant; Rankings from The Sports Network poll

2000 Southland Football League standings
	Conf.			Overall
Team	W		L	W		L
No. 9 Troy State $^	7	–	0	10	–	2
No. 16 McNeese State ^	5	–	2	8	–	4
No. 25 Southwest Texas State	5	–	2	7	–	4
Sam Houston State	4	–	3	7	–	4
Stephen F. Austin	3	–	4	6	–	5
Jacksonville State	2	–	5	4	–	6
Northwestern State	1	–	6	4	–	7
Nicholls State	1	–	6	2	–	9
$ – Conference champion; ^ – NCAA Division I-AA playoff participant; Northwestern State forfeited conference wins over Troy State and Nicholls State.; Rankings from The Sports Network poll

2001 Southland Football League standings
	Conf.			Overall
Team	W		L	W		L
No. 7 Sam Houston State +^	5	–	1	10	–	3
No. 13 McNeese State +^	5	–	1	8	–	4
No. 14 Northwestern State ^	4	–	2	8	–	4
Stephen F. Austin	4	–	2	6	–	5
Jacksonville State	2	–	4	5	–	6
Nicholls State	1	–	5	3	–	8
Southwest Texas State	0	–	6	4	–	7
+ – Conference co-champions; ^ – NCAA Division I-AA playoff participant; Rankings from The Sports Network poll

2002 Southland Football League standings
	Conf.			Overall
Team	W		L	W		L
No. 2 McNeese State $^	6	–	0	13	–	2
No. 16 Northwestern State ^	4	–	2	9	–	4
No. 23 Nicholls State	3	–	3	7	–	4
Stephen F. Austin	3	–	3	6	–	5
Jacksonville State	2	–	4	5	–	6
Sam Houston State	2	–	4	4	–	7
Southwest Texas State	1	–	5	4	–	7
$ – Conference champion; ^ – NCAA Division I-AA playoff participant; Rankings from The Sports Network poll

2003 Southland Conference football standings
	Conf.			Overall
Team	W		L	W		L
No. 8 McNeese State $^	5	–	0	10	–	2
Stephen F. Austin	4	–	1	7	–	4
Northwestern State	2	–	3	7	–	5
Texas State	2	–	3	5	–	7
Sam Houston State	2	–	3	3	–	8
Nicholls State†	0	–	5	0	–	11
$ – Conference champion; ^ – NCAA Division I-AA playoff participant; † – Nicholls State forfeited 5 wins, including 3 conference victories.; Rankings from The Sports Network poll

2004 Southland Conference football standings
	Conf.			Overall
Team	W		L	W		L
No. 4 Sam Houston State +^	4	–	1	11	–	3
No. 17 Northwestern State +^	4	–	1	8	–	4
Texas State	3	–	2	5	–	6
Nicholls State	2	–	3	5	–	5
Stephen F. Austin	1	–	4	6	–	4
McNeese State	1	–	4	4	–	7
+ – Conference co-champions; ^ – NCAA Division I-AA playoff participant; Rankings from The Sports Network poll

2005 Southland Conference football standings
	Conf.			Overall
Team	W		L	W		L
No. 4 Texas State +^	5	–	1	11	–	3
No. 17 Nicholls State +^	5	–	1	6	–	4
McNeese State	3	–	3	5	–	4
Northwestern State	3	–	3	5	–	5
Southeastern Louisiana	2	–	4	4	–	6
Sam Houston State	2	–	4	3	–	7
Stephen F. Austin	1	–	5	5	–	6
+ – Conference co-champions; ^ – NCAA Division I-AA playoff participant; Rankings from The Sports Network poll

2006 Southland Conference football standings
	Conf.			Overall
Team	W		L	W		L
No. 21 McNeese State $^	5	–	1	7	–	5
Sam Houston State	4	–	2	6	–	5
Stephen F. Austin	4	–	2	4	–	7
Texas State	3	–	3	5	–	6
Nicholls State	2	–	4	4	–	7
Northwestern State	2	–	4	4	–	7
Southeastern Louisiana	1	–	5	2	–	9
$ – Conference champion; ^ – FCS playoff participant; Rankings from The Sports Network poll

2007 Southland Conference football standings
	Conf.			Overall
Team	W		L	W		L
No. 11 McNeese State $^	7	–	0	11	–	1
Sam Houston State	5	–	2	7	–	4
Central Arkansas*	5	–	2	6	–	5
Nicholls State	3	–	4	6	–	5
Texas State	3	–	4	4	–	7
Northwestern State	3	–	4	4	–	7
Southeastern Louisiana	2	–	5	3	–	8
Stephen F. Austin	0	–	7	0	–	11
$ – Conference champion; ^ – FCS playoff participant; * – Ineligible for postseason play due to transition from NCAA Division II; Rankings from The Sports Network poll

2008 Southland Conference football standings
	Conf.			Overall
Team	W		L	W		L
No. 12 Central Arkansas* $	6	–	1	10	–	2
No. 22 Texas State ^	5	–	2	8	–	5
McNeese State	4	–	3	7	–	3
Northwestern State	4	–	3	7	–	5
Nicholls State	3	–	4	3	–	6
Southeastern Louisiana	2	–	5	5	–	7
Sam Houston State	2	–	5	4	–	6
Stephen F. Austin	2	–	5	4	–	8
$ – Conference champion; ^ – FCS playoff participant; * – Ineligible for postseason play due to transition from NCAA Division II; Rankings from The Sports Network poll

2009 Southland Conference football standings
	Conf.			Overall
Team	W		L	W		L
No. 10 Stephen F. Austin +^	6	–	1	10	–	3
No. 12 McNeese State +^	6	–	1	9	–	2
No. 25 Texas State	5	–	2	7	–	4
Southeastern Louisiana	4	–	3	6	–	5
Sam Houston State	3	–	4	5	–	6
Central Arkansas	2	–	5	5	–	6
Nicholls State	2	–	5	3	–	9
Northwestern State	0	–	7	0	–	11
+ – Conference co-champions; ^ – FCS playoff participant; Rankings from The Sports Network poll

2010 Southland Conference football standings
	Conf.			Overall
Team	W		L	W		L
No. 8 Stephen F. Austin $^	6	–	1	9	–	3
McNeese State	5	–	2	6	–	5
Central Arkansas	4	–	3	7	–	4
Sam Houston State	4	–	3	6	–	5
Northwestern State	4	–	3	5	–	6
Nicholls State	3	–	4	4	–	7
Texas State	1	–	6	4	–	7
Southeastern Louisiana	1	–	6	2	–	9
$ – Conference champion; ^ – FCS playoff participant; Rankings from The Sports Network poll

2011 Southland Conference football standings
	Conf.			Overall
Team	W		L	W		L
No. 2 Sam Houston State $^	7	–	0	14	–	1
No. 14 Central Arkansas ^	6	–	1	9	–	4
Stephen F. Austin	5	–	2	6	–	5
McNeese State	4	–	3	6	–	5
Northwestern State	3	–	4	5	–	6
Lamar	2	–	5	4	–	7
Southeastern Louisiana	1	–	6	3	–	8
Nicholls State	0	–	7	1	–	10
$ – Conference champion; ^ – FCS playoff participant; Rankings from The Sports Network poll

2012 Southland Conference football standings
	Conf.			Overall
Team	W		L	W		L
No. 10 Central Arkansas +^	6	–	1	9	–	3
No. 2 Sam Houston State +^	6	–	1	11	–	4
Southeastern Louisiana	5	–	2	5	–	6
McNeese State	4	–	3	7	–	4
Stephen F. Austin	4	–	3	5	–	6
Northwestern State	2	–	5	4	–	7
Lamar	1	–	6	4	–	8
Nicholls State	0	–	7	1	–	10
+ – Conference co-champions; ^ – FCS playoff participant; Rankings from The Sports Network poll

2013 Southland Conference football standings
	Conf.			Overall
Team	W		L	W		L
No. 6 Southeastern Louisiana $^	7	–	0	11	–	3
No. 11 McNeese State ^	6	–	1	10	–	3
No. 14 Sam Houston State ^	4	–	3	9	–	5
Central Arkansas	4	–	3	7	–	5
Northwestern State	3	–	4	6	–	6
Lamar	2	–	5	5	–	7
Nicholls State	1	–	6	4	–	8
Stephen F. Austin	1	–	6	3	–	9
$ – Conference champion; ^ – FCS playoff participant; Rankings from The Sports Network poll

2014 Southland Conference football standings
	Conf.			Overall
Team	W		L	W		L
No. 6 Sam Houston St +^	7	–	1	11	–	5
No. 14 SE Louisiana +^	7	–	1	9	–	4
Lamar	5	–	3	8	–	4
Stephen F. Austin ^	5	–	3	8	–	5
Central Arkansas	5	–	3	6	–	6
McNeese State	4	–	4	6	–	5
Abilene Christian *	4	–	4	6	–	6
Northwestern State	4	–	4	6	–	6
Incarnate Word *	2	–	6	2	–	9
Houston Baptist	1	–	7	2	–	9
Nicholls State	0	–	8	0	–	12
+ – Conference co-champions; ^ – FCS playoff participant; * – ineligible for FCS playoffs due to transition from NCAA Division II; Rankings from The Sports Network poll

2015 Southland Conference football standings
	Conf.			Overall
Team	W		L	W		L
No. 7 McNeese State $^	9	–	0	10	–	1
No. 3 Sam Houston State ^	7	–	2	11	–	4
Central Arkansas	7	–	2	7	–	4
Incarnate Word *	5	–	4	6	–	5
Lamar	4	–	5	5	–	6
Northwestern State	4	–	5	4	–	7
Stephen F. Austin	4	–	5	4	–	7
SE Louisiana	3	–	6	4	–	7
Abilene Christian *	3	–	6	3	–	8
Nicholls State	3	–	6	3	–	8
Houston Baptist	0	–	8	2	–	9
$ – Conference champion; ^ – FCS playoff participant; * – ineligible for FCS playoffs due to transition from NCAA Division II; Rankings from STATS poll

2016 Southland Conference football standings
	Conf.			Overall
Team	W		L	W		L
No. 5 Sam Houston State $^	9	–	0	12	–	1
No. 14 Central Arkansas ^	8	–	1	10	–	3
SE Louisiana	7	–	2	7	–	4
McNeese State	5	–	4	6	–	5
Nicholls State	5	–	4	5	–	6
Stephen F. Austin	4	–	5	5	–	6
Houston Baptist	3	–	5	4	–	7
Incarnate Word *	3	–	6	3	–	8
Lamar	3	–	6	3	–	8
Abilene Christian *	2	–	7	2	–	9
Northwestern State	0	–	9	1	–	10
$ – Conference champion; ^ – FCS playoff participant; * – ineligible for FCS playoffs due to transition from NCAA Division II; Rankings from STATS poll

2017 Southland Conference football standings
	Conf.			Overall
Team	W		L	W		L
No. 10 Central Arkansas $^	9	–	0	10	–	2
No. 4 Sam Houston State ^	8	–	1	12	–	2
No. 25 Nicholls State ^	7	–	2	8	–	4
No. 22 McNeese State	7	–	2	9	–	2
Southeastern Louisiana	6	–	3	6	–	5
Northwestern State	4	–	5	4	–	7
Stephen F. Austin	4	–	5	4	–	7
Abilene Christian	2	–	7	2	–	9
Incarnate Word	1	–	7	1	–	10
Lamar	1	–	8	2	–	9
Houston Baptist	0	–	9	1	–	10
$ – Conference champion; ^ – FCS playoff participant; Rankings from STATS poll

2018 Southland Conference football standings
	Conf.			Overall
Team	W		L	W		L
No. 14 Nicholls +^	7	–	2	9	–	4
Incarnate Word +^	6	–	2	6	–	5
Lamar ^	6	–	3	7	–	5
Abilene Christian	5	–	4	6	–	5
Central Arkansas	5	–	4	6	–	5
McNeese State	5	–	4	6	–	5
Sam Houston State	5	–	4	6	–	5
Northwestern State	4	–	5	5	–	6
Southeastern Louisiana	4	–	5	4	–	7
Stephen F. Austin	2	–	7	2	–	8
Houston Baptist	0	–	9	1	–	10
+ – Conference co-champions; ^ – FCS playoff participant; Rankings from STATS poll

2019 Southland Conference football standings
	Conf.			Overall
Team	W		L	W		L
No. 14 Nicholls +^	7	–	2	8	–	4
No. 11 Central Arkansas +^	7	–	2	9	–	3
No. 19 Southeastern Louisiana ^	6	–	3	8	–	5
Sam Houston State	6	–	3	7	–	5
McNeese State	5	–	4	7	–	5
Incarnate Word	4	–	5	5	–	7
Abilene Christian	4	–	5	5	–	7
Northwestern State	3	–	6	3	–	9
Stephen F. Austin	3	–	6	3	–	9
Houston Baptist	2	–	6	5	–	7
Lamar	2	–	7	4	–	8
+ – Conference co-champions; ^ – FCS playoff participant; Rankings from STATS poll

2020 Southland Conference football standings
	Conf.			Overall
Team	W		L	W		L
No. 1 Sam Houston State $^	6	–	0	10	–	0
No. 20 Southeastern Louisiana	4	–	2	4	–	3
No. 23 Nicholls	3	–	3	4	–	3
Incarnate Word	3	–	3	3	–	3
Lamar	2	–	4	2	–	4
McNeese State*	2	–	4	3	–	4
Northwestern State	1	–	5	1	–	5
$ – Conference champion; ^ – FCS playoff participant; * – Ineligible for FCS postseason play due to NCAA sanctions Note: Abilene Christian, Central Arkansas, Houston Baptist, and Stephen F. Austin played only in the fall and opted out of the spring season.; Rankings from STATS Poll

2021 Southland Conference football standings
	Conf.			Overall
Team	W		L	W		L
No. 12 Incarnate Word $^	7	–	1	10	–	3
No. 15 Southeastern Louisiana ^	6	–	2	9	–	4
Nicholls	5	–	3	6	–	5
McNeese State *	3	–	5	4	–	7
Northwestern State	3	–	5	3	–	8
Houston Baptist	0	–	8	0	–	11
$ – Conference champion; ^ – FCS playoff participant; * – Ineligible for FCS postseason play due to NCAA sanctions; Rankings from STATS Poll

2022 Southland Conference football standings
	Conf.			Overall
Team	W		L	W		L
No. 12 Southeastern Louisiana +^	5	–	1	9	–	4
No. 3 Incarnate Word +^	5	–	1	12	–	2
Northwestern State	4	–	2	4	–	7
Nicholls	3	–	3	3	–	8
Texas A&M–Commerce *	3	–	3	5	–	6
McNeese	2	–	4	4	–	7
Houston Christian	1	–	5	2	–	9
Lamar	1	–	5	1	–	10
+ – Conference co-champions; ^ – FCS playoff participant; * – Texas A&M–Commerce ineligible for FCS postseason play due to transition from NCAA Division II; Rankings from STATS Poll

2023 Southland Conference football standings
	Conf.			Overall
Team	W		L	W		L
Nicholls $^	7	–	0	6	–	5
No. 22 Incarnate Word	6	–	1	8	–	2
Lamar	5	–	2	6	–	5
Houston Christian	4	–	3	5	–	5
Southeastern Louisiana	3	–	4	3	–	8
Texas A&M–Commerce *	2	–	5	1	–	9
McNeese	1	–	6	0	–	10
Northwestern State **	0	–	2	0	–	6
$ – Conference champion; ^ – FCS playoff participant; * – Texas A&M–Commerce ineligible for FCS postseason play due to transition from NCAA Division II. ** – Northwestern State canceled its season on October 26.; Rankings from STATS Poll

2024 Southland Conference football standings
	Conf.			Overall
Team	W		L	W		L
No. 6 Incarnate Word $^	7	–	0	11	–	3
Southeastern Louisiana	6	–	1	7	–	5
Stephen F. Austin	4	–	3	7	–	5
Lamar	4	–	3	7	–	5
McNeese	3	–	4	6	–	6
Houston Christian	3	–	4	5	–	7
East Texas A&M*	2	–	4	3	–	9
Nicholls	2	–	5	4	–	8
Northwestern State	0	–	7	0	–	12
$ – Conference champion; ^ – FCS playoff participant; * – East Texas A&M is ineligible for FCS postseason play due to transition from NCAA Division II.; Rankings from STATS Poll

2025 Southland Conference football standings
	Conf.			Overall
Team	W		L	W		L
Nicholls	1	–	0	1	–	0
East Texas A&M	0	–	0	0	–	0
Houston Christian	0	–	0	0	–	0
Lamar	0	–	0	0	–	0
McNeese	0	–	0	0	–	0
Northwestern State	0	–	0	0	–	0
Southeastern Louisiana	0	–	0	0	–	0
No. 23 Stephen F. Austin	0	–	0	0	–	0
UT Rio Grande Valley	0	–	0	0	–	0
No. 5 Incarnate Word	0	–	1	0	–	1
As of August 25, 2025; Rankings from STATS Poll
