= Brad Wright (American football) =

American football player and coach (born 1959)

Biographical details
- Born: July 10, 1959 (age 67); Pearsall, Texas, U.S.

Playing career
- 1978–1980: Southwest Texas State
- Positions: Running back, safety

Coaching career (HC unless noted)
- 1999–2000: East Bernard HS (TX)
- 2000–2003: Canyon HS (TX)
- 2004–2006: Texas State (RB)
- 2007–2010: Texas State
- 2010–2011: Wharton HS (TX)
- 2012–2015: Waller HS (TX)
- 2017–2018: Sacred Heart HS (TX)

Head coaching record
- Overall: 23–23 (college)

Brad Wright (born July 10, 1959) is an American football coach. He served as head football coach at Texas State University–San Marcos—now known as Texas State University—from 2007 to 2010.

Wright is a 1981 graduate of Texas State—then known as Southwest Texas State University—and was a member of the 1980 Bobcats team that won a Lone Star Conference championship. He originally walked-on as a wide receiver, played a season at running back, and then moved to the other side of the ball where he became a defensive leader at free safety.

Wright went on to become a successful high school football coach. In 2004, Wright was hired by Texas State as an assistant to head coach David Bailiff. Bailiff and Wright were teammates at Southwest Texas State from 1978 to 1980. When Bailiff left for Rice University in 2007, Wright took over as head coach and held the job until he was fired on November 23, 2010.

== Head coaching record ==
=== College ===
Year	Team	Overall	Conference	Standing	Bowl/playoffs	TSN^{#}	Coaches^{°}
Texas State Bobcats (Southland Conference) (2007–2010)
2007	Texas State	4–7	3–4	T–4th			
2008	Texas State	8–5	5–2	1st	L NCAA Division I First Round	22	23
2009	Texas State	7–4	5–2	3rd		25	24
2010	Texas State	4–7	1–6	T–7th			
Texas State:		23–23	14–14				
Total:		23–23					
