= J. C. Harper =

American football player and coach (born 1965)

Biographical details
- Born: December 13, 1965 (age 60)

Playing career
- 1985–1988: Clemson
- Position: Defensive tackle

Coaching career (HC unless noted)
- 1989: North Carolina (GA)
- 1990–1991: Notre Dame (GA)
- 1992–1996: Southwest Missouri State (DL)
- 1997–1998: Southwest Missouri State (DC)
- 1999–2001: McNeese State (DL)
- 2002: Northwestern State (AHC/DC/LB)
- 2003: Western Michigan (DL)
- 2004: Western Michigan (DC)
- 2005–2006: Stephen F. Austin (DC)
- 2007–2013: Stephen F. Austin

Head coaching record
- Overall: 37–45

Accomplishments and honors

Championships
- 2 Southland (2009, 2010)

Awards
- 2× Southland Coach of the Year (2009, 2010)

J. C. Harper (born December 13, 1965) is an American former college football player and coach. He served as head football coach at Stephen F. Austin State University (SFA) from 2007 to 2013, compiling a record of 37–45.

== Playing career ==
Harper played defensive tackle at Clemson University from 1985 to 1988, while his father, Tom Harper, served as defensive coordinator. He was a member of three Atlantic Coast Conference (ACC) championship teams and four bowl teams. Clemson also finished in the final top 20 of the AP poll in 1986, 1987 and 1988.

== Coaching career ==
Harper was promoted to head coach of the Stephen F. Austin Lumberjacks from his position of defensive coordinator in December 2006. He was the third head coach for the team in four seasons. Harper led the Lumberjacks to a Southland Conference (SLC) championship in just his third season and then repeated as SLC champions in his fourth season. It was the first back-to-back championships in school history.

=== 2009 season ===
The 2009 season saw the program's first conference title in ten years (where they shared the conference title with McNeese State), a berth in the NCAA FCS playoffs and a top-10 national ranking. It was the second-biggest single-season turnaround at the NCAA FCS level, and the fourth-best turnaround at the NCAA Division I level.

Following the 2009 campaign Harper was recognized for his efforts being named the SLC Coach of the Year, and finishing second by only two points for the Eddie Robinson National Coach of the Year award.

It was the first time in ten years a Lumberjack squad had earned the SLC Championship trophy, and it was the program's first trip to the FCS playoffs since the 1995 season. Harper led SFA to double-digit wins for only the fourth time in school history, and the first time since its playoff run during the 1995 campaign. Throughout the course of the record-setting 2009 campaign, the Lumberjacks recorded victories over three nationally ranked opponents, including two ranked among the nation's top 10.

The 2009 campaign saw 20 Lumberjacks named to the All-SLC teams, including five first-team selections. Along with the all-conference team's quarterback Jeremy Moses was named SLC Player of the Year, defensive end Tim Knicky was named defensive player of the year and corner back Andre Banks received league newcomer of the year honors. The accolades didn't stop at the conference level. Twelve Lumberjacks earned All-America recognition, including five first-team selections.

=== 2010 season ===
The Lumberjacks posted a 9–3 overall record and won their second-straight Southland Conference title in 2010. It marked the first time in conference history that SFA has won back-to-back conference titles. The 'Jacks recorded their second-straight top-10 national ranking, and advanced to the NCAA FCS playoffs for a second consecutive season where they hosted Villanova. It was also the second-straight year that SFA led the nation in passing.

The Lumberjacks dominated the All-SLC teams, placing a league-best 21 players on the all-conference squad, including nine first-team selections. Among the nine first-teams selections five earned All-America honors. Following the season SLC Player of the Year Jeremy Moses was named the 2010 Walter Payton Award winner, becoming the first player in school and conference history to receive the player of the year award, which came on the heels of a season that saw him become the conference's all-time leading quarterback and set a new NCAA FCS record for completions.

Linebacker Jabara Williams became the second Lumberjack in the past three years to be drafted when he was selected by the St. Louis Rams in the seventh round of the 2011 NFL draft. It marked the third consecutive season that SFA has had a player either be drafted or sign a contract with an NFL franchise.

== Head coaching record ==
Year	Team	Overall	Conference	Standing	Bowl/playoffs	TSN^{#}
Stephen F. Austin Lumberjacks (Southland Conference) (2007–2013)
2007	Stephen F. Austin	0–11	0–7	7th		
2008	Stephen F. Austin	4–8	2–5	T–6th		
2009	Stephen F. Austin	10–3	6–1	1st	L NCAA Division I Quarterfinal	9
2010	Stephen F. Austin	9–3	6–1	1st	L NCAA Division I First Round	8
2011	Stephen F. Austin	6–5	5–2	3rd		
2012	Stephen F. Austin	5–6	4–3	T–4th		
2013	Stephen F. Austin	3–9	1–6	T–7th		
Stephen F. Austin:		37–45	24–25			
Total:		37–45				
National championship Conference title Conference division title or championship game berth
