= 2008 Mississippi State Bulldogs football team =

American college football season

2008 Mississippi State Bulldogs football
- Conference: Southeastern Conference
- Western Division
- Record: 4–8 (2–6 SEC)
- Head coach: Sylvester Croom (5th season)
- Offensive coordinator: Woody McCorvey (5th season)
- Offensive scheme: West Coast
- Defensive coordinator: Charlie Harbison (1st season)
- Base defense: 4–3
- Home stadium: Davis Wade Stadium

2008 Southeastern Conference football standings
	Conf.			Overall
Team	W		L	W		L
Eastern Division
No. 1 Florida x$#	7	–	1	13	–	1
No. 13 Georgia	6	–	2	10	–	3
Vanderbilt	4	–	4	7	–	6
South Carolina	4	–	4	7	–	6
Tennessee	3	–	5	5	–	7
Kentucky	2	–	6	7	–	6
Western Division
No. 6 Alabama x%	8	–	0	12	–	2
No. 14 Ole Miss	5	–	3	9	–	4
LSU	3	–	5	8	–	5
Arkansas	2	–	6	5	–	7
Auburn	2	–	6	5	–	7
Mississippi State	2	–	6	4	–	8
Championship: Florida 31, Alabama 20
# – BCS National Champion; $ – BCS representative as conference champion; % – BCS at-large representative; x – Division champion/co-champions; Rankings from AP Poll

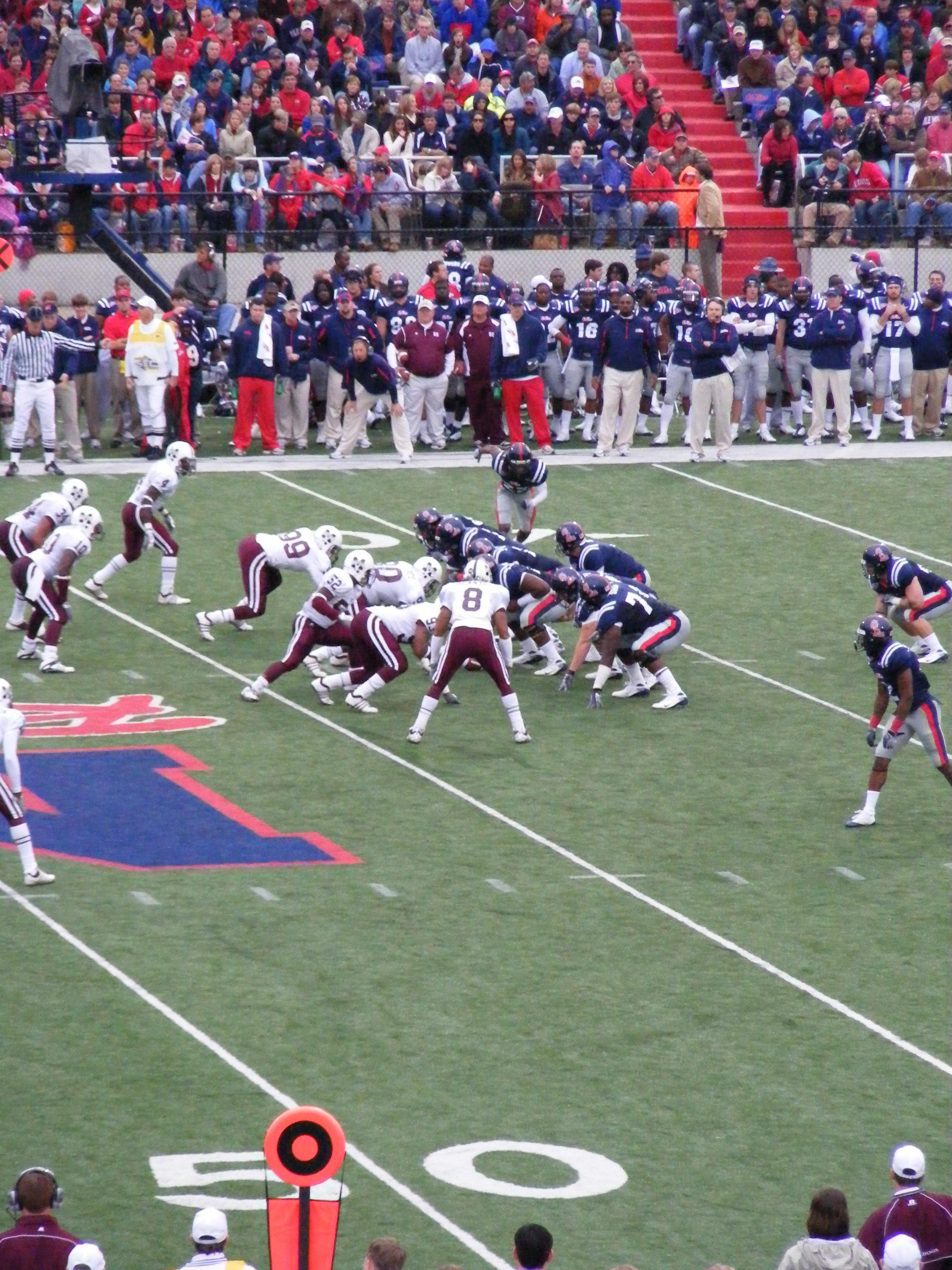
Ole Miss and Mississippi State playing in the 2008 Egg Bowl

The 2008 Mississippi State Bulldogs football team represented Mississippi State University as a member of the Western Division of the Southern Conference (SEC) during the 2008 NCAA Division I FBS football season. Led by Sylvester Croom in his fifth and final season as head coach, the Bulldogs compiled an overall record of 4–8 with a mark of 2–6 in conference play, placing in a three-way tie for fourth in the SEC's Western Division. Mississippi State played home games at Davis Wade Stadium in Starkville, Mississippi.

Croom resigned at the end of the season. On December 10, Mississippi State hired Florida offensive coordinator Dan Mullen.

== Schedule ==
Date	Time	Opponent	Site	TV	Result	Attendance
August 30	5:45 p.m.	at Louisiana Tech*	Joe Aillet Stadium; Ruston, LA	ESPN2	L 14–22	25,224
September 6	6:00 p.m.	Southeastern Louisiana*	Davis Wade Stadium; Starkville, MS		W 34–10	41,938
September 13	6:00 p.m.	No. 9 Auburn	Davis Wade Stadium; Starkville, MS	ESPN2	L 2–3	55,082
September 20	11:00 a.m.	at Georgia Tech*	Bobby Dodd Stadium; Atlanta, GA	Raycom	L 7–38	48,402
September 27	6:30 p.m.	at No. 5 LSU	Tiger Stadium; Baton Rouge, LA (rivalry)	ESPN2	L 24–34	92,710
October 11	1:30 p.m.	No. 13 Vanderbilt	Davis Wade Stadium; Starkville, MS	PPV	W 17–14	43,619
October 18	6:00 p.m.	at Tennessee	Neyland Stadium; Knoxville, TN	PPV	L 3–34	98,239
October 25	6:00 p.m.	Middle Tennessee*^{†}	Davis Wade Stadium; Starkville, MS	ESPNU	W 31–22	40,024
November 1	1:30 p.m.	Kentucky	Davis Wade Stadium; Starkville, MS	PPV	L 13–14	40,168
November 15	6:45 p.m.	at No. 1 Alabama	Bryant–Denny Stadium; Tuscaloosa, AL (rivalry)	ESPN	L 7–32	92,138
November 22	1:30 p.m.	Arkansas	Davis Wade Stadium; Starkville, MS		W 31–28	42,056
November 28	11:30 a.m.	at No. 25 Ole Miss	Vaught–Hemingway Stadium; Oxford, MS (Egg Bowl)	Raycom	L 0–45	55,231
*Non-conference game; ^{†}Homecoming; Rankings from AP Poll released prior to the game; All times are in Central time

== Game summaries ==
=== Louisiana Tech ===
Team	1	2	3	4	Total
MSU Bulldogs	7	7	0	0	14
• LT Bulldogs	3	6	10	3	22

- Date: August 30
- Location: Joe Aillet Stadium, Ruston, Louisiana
- Game attendance: 25,224

=== Southeastern Louisiana ===
Team	1	2	3	4	Total
Lions	3	0	0	7	10
• Bulldogs	7	13	14	0	34

- Date: September 6
- Location: Davis Wade Stadium, Starkville, Mississippi
- Game attendance: 41,938

=== Auburn ===
Team	1	2	3	4	Total
• Tigers	0	3	0	0	3
Bulldogs	0	0	0	2	2

- Date: September 13, 2008
- Location: Davis Wade Stadium, Starkville, Mississippi
- Game attendance: 55,082

=== Georgia Tech ===
Team	1	2	3	4	Total
Bulldogs	0	0	0	7	7
• Yellow Jackets	14	7	10	7	38

- Date: September 20, 2008
- Location: Bobby Dodd Stadium, Atlanta
- Game attendance: 48,402

=== LSU ===
Team	1	2	3	4	Total
Bulldogs	3	0	14	7	24
• Tigers	10	7	7	10	34

- Date: September 27, 2008
- Location: Tiger Stadium, Baton Rouge, Louisiana
- Game attendance: 92,710

=== Vanderbilt ===
Team	1	2	3	4	Total
Commodores	0	7	0	7	14
• Bulldogs	3	0	7	7	17

- Date: October 11, 2008
- Location: Davis Wade Stadium, Starkville, Mississippi
- Game attendance: 43,619

=== Tennessee ===
Team	1	2	3	4	Total
Bulldogs	0	3	0	0	3
• Volunteers	0	6	7	21	34

- Date: October 18
- Location: Neyland Stadium, Knoxville, Tennessee
- Game attendance: 98,239

=== Middle Tennessee ===
Team	1	2	3	4	Total
Blue Raiders	3	10	3	6	22
• Bulldogs	14	0	10	7	31

- Date: October 25
- Location: Davis Wade Stadium, Starkville, Mississippi
- Game attendance: 40,024

=== Kentucky ===
Team	1	2	3	4	Total
• Wildcats	0	0	14	0	14
Bulldogs	7	0	0	6	13

- Date: November 1
- Location: Davis Wade Stadium, Starkville, Mississippi
- Game attendance: 40,168

=== Alabama ===
Team	1	2	3	4	Total
Bulldogs	0	7	0	0	7
• Crimson Tide	5	7	10	10	32

- Date: 2008-11-15
- Location: Bryant–Denny Stadium, Tuscaloosa, Alabama

=== Arkansas ===
Team	1	2	3	4	Total
Razorbacks	14	0	7	7	28
• Bulldogs	7	10	7	7	31

- Date: November 17
- Location: Davis Wade Stadium, Starkville, Mississippi

=== Ole Miss ===
Egg Bowl

Team	1	2	3	4	Total
Bulldogs	0	0	0	0	0
• Rebels	24	7	7	7	45

- Date: November 28
- Location: Vaught–Hemingway Stadium, Oxford, Mississippi
- Game start: 11:30 a.m. CST

== Coaching staff ==
Name	Responsibility	Position Group	Year	Alma mater
Sylvester Croom	Head coach		5th	University of Alabama (1975)
Woody McCorvey	Asst. Head Coach, Offensive Coordinator	Quarterbacks	5th	Alabama State University (1972)
Charlie Harbison	Defensive Coordinator	Safeties	2nd	Gardner–Webb University (1995)
Reed Stringer	Special Teams Coordinator	Tight Ends	5th	Delta State University (2001)
Rocky Felker	Recruiting Coordinator	Running Backs	7th	Mississippi State University (1972)
J.B. Grimes		Offensive Linemen	5th	Henderson State University (1977)
David Turner		Defensive Linemen	2nd	Davidson University (1985)
Melvin Smith		Cornerbacks	3rd	Millsaps College (1982)
Pat Washington		Wide Receivers	2nd	Auburn University (1987)
Louis Campbell		Linebackers	1st	University of Arkansas (1973)
Ben Pollard	Head Strength & Conditioning Coach		2nd	Texas Tech University (1984)
Brad Pendergrass	Assistant Athletic Director for Football Operations		5th	University of Tennessee (1998)
Ryan Hollern	Coordinator of Recruiting Operations		2nd	Gannon University (2001)

== Statistics ==
Mississippi State Overall Team Statistics (as of Oct 11, 2008)

=== Team ===
Statistics	Mississippi State	Opponents
Scoring	183	296
Points per game	15.2	24.7
First downs	187	200
Rushing	69	95
Passing	108	89
Penalties	10	16
Total offensive yards	3,312	3,990
Avg per game	276.0	327.5
Rushing	1,220	1,811
Passing	2,092	2,119
Fumbles–Lost	19-8	20-8
Penalties–yards	68-544	76-643
Average per game	45.3	53.6

Statistics	Mississippi State	Opponents
Punts–Yards	82-3,099	66-2,671
Average per punt	37.8	40.5
Average ToP/game	30:15	29:45
3rd down conversions	58-178	59-168
3rd down percentage	33	35
4th down conversions	8-18	10-11
4th down percentage	44	91
Touchdowns scored	23	35
Field goals–att–long	7–13–42	17-25–20
PAT–Att	22–23	33-34
Attendance	260,716	411,944
Average	43,453	68,657

==== Scores by quarter ====
	1	2	3	4	Total
Mississippi State	48	47	38	50	183
Opponents	76	60	78	82	296

=== Offense ===
==== Rushing ====
Name	GP-GS	Att	Gain	Loss	Net	Avg	TD	Long	Avg/G
Anthony Dixon	12-12	197	930	61	869	4.4	7	71	72.4
Christian Ducre	12-1	56	234	12	222	4.0	2	20	18.5
Robert Elliott	4-0	18	65	4	61	3.4	1	15	15.2
Tyson Lee	11-8	62	228	191	37	0.6	1	18	3.4
Wesley Carroll	7-4	18	54	72	-18	-1.0	0	20	-2.6
Jamayel Smith	12-4	2	13	10	3	1.5	0	9	0.2
Wade Bonner	12-0	7	11	1	10	1.4	0	3	0.8
Brandon Hart	12-2	4	9	0	9	2.2	1	4	0.8
Chris Relf	2-0	7	20	33	-13	-1.9	0	10	-6.5
Eric Hoskins	11-4	1	3	0	3	3.0	0	3	0.3
Brandon McRae	12-10	1	0	1	-1	-1.0	0	0	-0.1
Marcus Green	2-1	1	0	3	-3	-3.0	0	0	-1.5
TEAM	8-0	8	0	30	-30	-3.8	0	0	-3.8
Total	12	397	1645	425	1220	3.1	13	71	101.7
Opponents	12	443	2055	244	1811	4.1	19	88	150.9

==== Passing ====
Name	GP-GS	Effic	Att-Cmp-Int	Pct	Yds	TD	Lng	Avg/G
Tyson Lee	11-8	112.96	153-260-5	58.8	1519	7	41	138.1
Wesley Carroll	7-4	85.17	55-115-7	47.8	560	3	50	80.0
Chris Relf	2-0	34.36	2-9-0	22.2	13	0	12	6.5
TEAM	8-0	0.00	0-1-0	0.0	0	0	0	0.0
Total	12	102.53	210-385-12	54.5	2,092	10	50	174.3
Opponents	12	115.40	169-324-8	52.2	2119	13	87	176.6

==== Receiving ====
Name	GP-GS	No.	Yds	Avg	TD	Long	Avg/G
Brandon McRae	6-4	33	302	9.2	2	24	50.3
Aubrey Bell	6-5	19	171	9.0	0	22	28.5
Christian Ducre	6-1	11	91	8.3	1	24	15.2
Jamayel Smith	6-2	8	120	15.0	0	41	20.0
Co-Eric Riley	6-1	8	75	9.4	0	26	12.5
Delmon Robinson	4-0	7	84	12.0	0	25	21.0
Eric Hoskins	5-1	5	36	7.2	0	14	7.2
Anthony Dixon	6-6	5	22	4.4	0	12	3.7
Robert Elliott	4-0	4	53	13.2	0	19	13.2
Arnil Stallworth	6-0	4	45	11.2	0	29	7.5
Brandon Henderson	6-0	2	11	5.5	1	7	1.8
Marcus Green	2-1	1	50	50.0	0	50	25.0
Brandon Hart	6-2	1	8	8.0	0	8	1.3
Wade Bonner	5-0	1	6	6.0	0	6	1.2
Austin Wilbanks	4-2	1	1	1.0	1	1	0.2
Total	6	110	1,075	9.8	5	50	179.2
Opponents	6	65	829	12.8	4	70	138.2

=== Defense ===
Name	GP	Tackles				Sacks	Pass defense		Interceptions				Fumbles		Blkd Kick
Name	GP	Solo	Ast	Total	TFL-Yds	No-Yds	BrUp	QBH	No.-Yds	Avg	TD	Long	Rcv-Yds	FF	Blkd Kick
Total															

=== Special teams ===
Name	Punting								Kickoffs				
Name	No.	Yds	Avg	Long	TB	FC	I20	Blkd	No.	Yds	Avg	TB	OB
Blake McAdams	35	1,261	36.0	53	0	12	8	0					
Adam Carlson	2	50	25.0	28	0	0	1	0	18	1,016	56.4	0	1
Eric Richards									3	190	63.3	0	0
Total	37	1,311	35.4	53	0	12	9	0	21	1,206	57.4	0	1

Name	Punt returns					Kick returns				
Name	No.	Yds	Avg	TD	Long	No.	Yds	Avg	TD	Long
Total										
