= 2010 Lamar Cardinals football team =

American college football season

2010 Lamar Cardinals football
- Conference: Independent
- Record: 5–6
- Head coach: Ray Woodard (1st season)
- Offensive scheme: Multiple
- Co-defensive coordinators: Craig McGallion (1st season); Allen Johnson (1st season)
- Base defense: 3–4
- Home stadium: Provost Umphrey Stadium

2010 NCAA Division I FCS independents football standings
	Conf.			Overall
Team	W		L	W		L
Old Dominion		–		8	–	3
Georgia State		–		6	–	5
Lamar		–		5	–	6

The 2010 Lamar Cardinals football season was their first since 1989 and the first for head coach Ray Woodard and his staff. The Cardinals opened up the season on September 4 against arch-rival, #11 McNeese State in Lake Charles. The crowd of 19,235 that filled Cowboy Stadium marked the highest attendance since 2002 for the Cowboys. Lamar quarterback Andre Bevil set a school record for passing yards with 427 yards through the air. The game featured a late fourth quarter surge by the Cardinals with two touch down passes thrown in the final quarter of the game. McNeese clinched the 30–27 victory when they converted on third and 10 with less than a minute left.

== Schedule ==
Date	Time	Opponent	Site	TV	Result	Attendance	Source
September 4	7:00 pm	at No. 12 McNeese State	Cowboy Stadium; Lake Charles, LA (Battle of the Border)		L 27–30	19,235	
September 11,	6:00 pm	Webber International	Provost Umphrey Stadium; Beaumont, TX		W 21–14	16,600	
September 18	6:00 pm	at Southeastern Louisiana	Strawberry Stadium; Hammond, LA		W 29–28	4,217	
September 25	6:00 pm	at No. 6 Stephen F. Austin	Homer Bryce Stadium; Nacogdoches, TX	KBTV	L 3–71	13,281	
October 2	6:00 pm	Sam Houston State	Provost Umphrey Stadium; Beaumont, TX		L 10–38	17,187	
October 9	6:00 pm	Langston^{†}	Provost Umphrey Stadium; Beaumont, TX		W 14–0	17,306	
October 16	6:00 pm	South Alabama	Provost Umphrey Stadium; Beaumont, TX		L 0–26	16,150	
October 30	12:00 pm	at North Dakota	Alerus Center; Grand Forks, ND		L 6–31	6,238	
November 6	1:00 pm	at Georgia State	Georgia Dome; Atlanta, GA		L 17–23	14,689	
November 13	6:00 pm	South Dakota	Provost Umphrey Stadium; Beaumont, TX		W 24–20	15,103	
November 20	6:00 pm	Oklahoma Panhandle State	Provost Umphrey Stadium; Beaumont, TX		W 44–6	14,125	
^{†}Homecoming; Rankings from The Sports Network Poll released prior to the game; All times are in Central time
