= 2010 Nicholls State Colonels football team =

American college football season

2010 Nicholls State Colonels football
- Conference: Southland Conference
- Record: 4–7 (3–4 Southland)
- Head coach: Charlie Stubbs (1st season)
- Offensive coordinator: Jaron Fairman (1st season)
- Offensive scheme: Multiple pro-style
- Defensive coordinator: Jeremy Atwell (2nd season)
- Base defense: Multiple 4–3
- Home stadium: John L. Guidry Stadium

2010 Southland Conference football standings
	Conf.			Overall
Team	W		L	W		L
No. 8 Stephen F. Austin $^	6	–	1	9	–	3
McNeese State	5	–	2	6	–	5
Central Arkansas	4	–	3	7	–	4
Sam Houston State	4	–	3	6	–	5
Northwestern State	4	–	3	5	–	6
Nicholls State	3	–	4	4	–	7
Texas State	1	–	6	4	–	7
Southeastern Louisiana	1	–	6	2	–	9
$ – Conference champion; ^ – FCS playoff participant; Rankings from The Sports Network poll

The 2010 Nicholls State Colonels football team represented Nicholls State University as a member of the Southland Conference during the 2010 NCAA Division I FCS football season. Led by first-year head coach Charlie Stubbs, the Colonels compiled an overall record of 4–7 with a mark of 3–4 in conference play, placing sixth in the Southland. Nicholls State played home games at John L. Guidry Stadium in Thibodaux, Louisiana.

== Schedule ==
Date	Time	Opponent	Site	Result	Attendance
September 4	7:00 p.m.	at San Diego State*	Qualcomm Stadium; San Diego, CA	L 0–47	25,290
September 11	6:00 p.m.	at Western Michigan*	Waldo Stadium; Kalamazoo, MI	L 14–49	19,327
September 18	4:00 p.m.	at South Alabama*	Ladd–Peebles Stadium; Mobile, AL	L 21–39	23,174
September 25	4:00 p.m.	Bacone*	John L. Guidry Stadium; Thibodaux, LA	W 44–28	5,428
October 9	4:00 p.m.	Sam Houston State	John L. Guidry Stadium; Thibodaux, LA	L 7–26	4,148
October 16	6:00 p.m.	at Texas State	Bobcat Stadium; San Marcos, TX (Battle for the Paddle)	W 47–45 ^{4 OT}	12,994
October 23	4:00 p.m.	Central Arkansas	John L. Guidry Stadium; Thibodaux, LA	L 7–31	4,268
October 30	7:00 p.m.	at McNeese State	Cowboy Stadium; Lake Charles, LA	L 14–24	13,012
November 6	4:00 p.m.	No. 10 Stephen F. Austin	John L. Guidry Stadium; Thibodaux, LA	L 13–48	3,007
November 13	2:00 p.m.	at Northwestern State	Harry Turpin Stadium; Natchitoches, LA (NSU Challenge)	W 37–7	7,501
November 18	6:00 p.m.	Southeastern Louisiana	John L. Guidry Stadium; Thibodaux, LA (River Bell Classic)	W 27–25	4,980
*Non-conference game; Rankings from The Sports Network Poll released prior to the game; All times are in Central time
