= 2010 Sam Houston State Bearkats football team =

American college football season

2010 Sam Houston State Bearkats football
- Conference: Southland Conference
- Record: 6–5 (4–3 Southland)
- Head coach: Willie Fritz (1st season)
- Offensive coordinator: Bob DeBesse (1st season)
- Offensive scheme: Multiple pistol
- Defensive coordinator: Scott Stoker (2nd season)
- Base defense: 3–3–5
- Home stadium: Bowers Stadium

2010 Southland Conference football standings
	Conf.			Overall
Team	W		L	W		L
No. 8 Stephen F. Austin $^	6	–	1	9	–	3
McNeese State	5	–	2	6	–	5
Central Arkansas	4	–	3	7	–	4
Sam Houston State	4	–	3	6	–	5
Northwestern State	4	–	3	5	–	6
Nicholls State	3	–	4	4	–	7
Texas State	1	–	6	4	–	7
Southeastern Louisiana	1	–	6	2	–	9
$ – Conference champion; ^ – FCS playoff participant; Rankings from The Sports Network poll

The 2010 Sam Houston State Bearkats football team represented Sam Houston State University as a member of the Southland Conference during the 2010 NCAA Division I FCS football season. Led by first-year head coach Willie Fritz, the Bearkats compiled an overall record of 6–5 with a mark of 4–3 in conference play, and finished tied for third in the Southland.

== Schedule ==
Date	Opponent	Site	Result	Attendance	Source
September 4	at Baylor*	Floyd Casey Stadium; Waco, TX	L 3–34	42,821	
September 18	at Western Illinois*	Hanson Field; Macomb, IL	L 14–56	10,965	
September 25	Gardner–Webb*	Bowers Stadium; Huntsville, TX	W 30–14	8,030	
October 2	at Lamar*	Provost Umphrey Stadium; Beaumont, TX	W 38–10	17,187	
October 9	at Nicholls State	John L. Guidry Stadium; Thibodaux, LA	W 26–7	4,148	
October 16	Southeastern Louisiana	Bowers Stadium; Huntsville, TX	W 57–7	7,457	
October 23	vs. No. 4 Stephen F. Austin	Reliant Stadium; Houston, TX (Battle of the Piney Woods)	L 28–31	24,685	
October 30	at Northwestern State	Harry Turpin Stadium; Natchitoches, LA	L 20–23 ^{2OT}	9,151	
November 6	McNeese State	Bowers Stadium; Huntsville, TX	L 28–33	4,228	
November 13	at Central Arkansas	Estes Stadium; Conway, AR	W 20–13	6,214	
November 20	Texas State	Bowers Stadium; Huntsville, TX (rivalry)	W 31–29	5,631	
*Non-conference game; Rankings from The Sports Network Poll released prior to the game
