= 2007 Nicholls State Colonels football team =

American college football season

2007 Nicholls State Colonels football
- Conference: Southland Conference
- Record: 6–5 (3–4 Southland)
- Head coach: Jay Thomas (4th season)
- Offensive coordinator: H. T. Kinney (4th season)
- Offensive scheme: Spread option
- Defensive coordinator: Steve Ellis (2nd season)
- Base defense: Multiple 4–3
- Home stadium: John L. Guidry Stadium

2007 Southland Conference football standings
	Conf.			Overall
Team	W		L	W		L
No. 11 McNeese State $^	7	–	0	11	–	1
Sam Houston State	5	–	2	7	–	4
Central Arkansas*	5	–	2	6	–	5
Nicholls State	3	–	4	6	–	5
Texas State	3	–	4	4	–	7
Northwestern State	3	–	4	4	–	7
Southeastern Louisiana	2	–	5	3	–	8
Stephen F. Austin	0	–	7	0	–	11
$ – Conference champion; ^ – FCS playoff participant; * – Ineligible for postseason play due to transition from NCAA Division II; Rankings from The Sports Network poll

The 2007 Nicholls State Colonels football team represented Nicholls State University as a member of the Southland Conference during the 2007 NCAA Division I FCS football season. Led by fourth-year head Jay Thomas, the Colonels compiled an overall record of 6–5 with a mark of 3–4 in conference play, placing in a three-way tie for fourth in the Southland. Nicholls State played home games at John L. Guidry Stadium in Thibodaux, Louisiana.

== Schedule ==
Date	Time	Opponent	Rank	Site	Result	Attendance	Source
September 1	7:00 p.m.	at Rice*		Rice Stadium; Houston, TX	W 16–13	11,859	
September 8	6:00 p.m.	Southern Arkansas*	No. 25	John L. Guidry Stadium; Thibodaux, LA	W 31–13	5,221	
September 15	8:00 p.m.	at Nevada*	No. 18	Mackay Stadium; Reno, NV	L 17–52	15,233	
September 22	12:00 p.m.	Azusa Pacific*		John L. Guidry Stadium; Thibodaux, LA	W 30–28		
October 6	2:00 p.m.	Northwestern State	No. 17	John L. Guidry Stadium; Thibodaux, LA (NSU Challenge)	W 58–0	4,912	
October 13	6:00 p.m.	at Stephen F. Austin	No. 14	Homer Bryce Stadium; Nacogdoches, TX	W 17–16	7,243	
October 20	6:00 p.m.	No. 6 McNeese State	No. 13	John L. Guidry Stadium; Thibodaux, LA	L 7–28	6,486	
October 27	6:00 p.m.	at Central Arkansas	No. 19	Estes Stadium; Conway, AR	L 42–49 ^{OT}	12,620	
November 3	6:00 p.m.	at Sam Houston State	No. 24	Bowers Stadium; Huntsville, TX	L 13–16	10,716	
November 10	2:00 p.m.	Texas State		John L. Guidry Stadium; Thibodaux, LA (Battle for the Paddle)	W 52–28	5,154	
November 17	2:30 p.m.	at Southeastern Louisiana		Strawberry Stadium; Hammond, LA (River Bell Classic)	L 13–17	5,122	
*Non-conference game; Rankings from The Sports Network Poll released prior to the game; All times are in Central time
