= 2008 McNeese State Cowboys football team =

American college football season

2008 McNeese State Cowboys football
- Conference: Southland Conference

Ranking
- Sports Network: No. 21
- Record: 7–4 (4–3 Southland)
- Head coach: Matt Viator (3rd season)
- Co-offensive coordinators: Broderick Fobbs (2nd season); Tim Leger (2nd season)
- Home stadium: Cowboy Stadium

2008 Southland Conference football standings
	Conf.			Overall
Team	W		L	W		L
No. 12 Central Arkansas* $	6	–	1	10	–	2
No. 22 Texas State ^	5	–	2	8	–	5
McNeese State	4	–	3	7	–	3
Northwestern State	4	–	3	7	–	5
Nicholls State	3	–	4	3	–	6
Southeastern Louisiana	2	–	5	5	–	7
Sam Houston State	2	–	5	4	–	6
Stephen F. Austin	2	–	5	4	–	8
$ – Conference champion; ^ – FCS playoff participant; * – Ineligible for postseason play due to transition from NCAA Division II; Rankings from The Sports Network poll

The 2008 McNeese State Cowboys football team was an American football team that represented McNeese State University as a member of the Southland Conference (Southland) during the 2008 NCAA Division I FCS football season. In their third year under head coach Matt Viator, the team compiled an overall record of 7–4, with a mark of 4–3 in conference play, and finished second in the Southland.

== Schedule ==
Date	Opponent	Rank	Site	Result	Attendance	Source
August 30	at North Carolina*	No. 10	Kenan Memorial Stadium; Chapel Hill, NC	L 27–35	58,000	
September 6	Delta State*	No. 10	Cowboy Stadium; Lake Charles, LA	W 52–27	17,148	
September 13	No. 14 Cal Poly*	No. 8	Cowboy Stadium; Lake Charles, LA	Cancelled (Note: The game against Cal Poly scheduled for September 13 was canceled due to the impacts of Hurricane Ike on Lake Charles.)		
September 27	Southern Virginia*	No. 6	Cowboy Stadium; Lake Charles, LA	W 63–7	12,035	
October 4	at No. 23 South Dakota State*	No. 4	Coughlin–Alumni Stadium; Brookings, SD	W 46–44 ^{3OT}	15,521	
October 11	Texas State	No. 3	Cowboy Stadium; Lake Charles, LA	L 42–45	12,304	
October 18	at Sam Houston State	No. 11	Bowers Stadium; Huntsville, TX	W 28–17	12,117	
October 25	Nicholls State	No. 11	Cowboy Stadium; Lake Charles, LA	L 35–38	14,635	
November 1	at Southeastern Louisiana	No. 20	Strawberry Stadium; Hammond, LA	W 24–14	6,212	
November 8	Stephen F. Austin	No. 18	Cowboy Stadium; Lake Charles, LA	W 42–31	13,025	
November 15	at Northwestern State	No. 16	Harry Turpin Stadium; Natchitoches, LA (rivalry)	W 24–17	9,710	
November 22	at No. 13 Central Arkansas	No. 14	Estes Stadium; Conway, AR (rivalry)	L 30–47	10,220	
*Non-conference game; Rankings from The Sports Network Poll released prior to the game
