= 2008 Texas State Bobcats football team =

American college football season

2008 Texas State Bobcats football

NCAA Division I First Round, L 13–31 vs. Montana
- Conference: Southland Conference

Ranking
- Sports Network: No. 22
- FCS Coaches: No. 23
- Record: 8–5 (5–2 Southland)
- Head coach: Brad Wright (2nd season)
- Co-offensive coordinators: Ben Norton (2nd season); Travis Bush (2nd season)
- Offensive scheme: Multiple
- Defensive coordinator: Fred Bleil (1st season)
- Base defense: 3–4
- Home stadium: Bobcat Stadium

2008 Southland Conference football standings
	Conf.			Overall
Team	W		L	W		L
No. 12 Central Arkansas* $	6	–	1	10	–	2
No. 22 Texas State ^	5	–	2	8	–	5
McNeese State	4	–	3	7	–	3
Northwestern State	4	–	3	7	–	5
Nicholls State	3	–	4	3	–	6
Southeastern Louisiana	2	–	5	5	–	7
Sam Houston State	2	–	5	4	–	6
Stephen F. Austin	2	–	5	4	–	8
$ – Conference champion; ^ – FCS playoff participant; * – Ineligible for postseason play due to transition from NCAA Division II; Rankings from The Sports Network poll

The 2008 Texas State Bobcats football team represented Texas State University–San Marcos in the 2008 NCAA Division I FCS football season. The Bobcats led by second year head coach Brad Wright, played their home games at Bobcat Stadium as a member of the Southland Conference. They finished the season with a record of eight wins and five losses (8–5, 5–2 Southland). Despite finishing in second place in conference play, they earned the Southland Conference's automatic bid, due to the conference champion Central Arkansas being ineligible for the postseason due to their transition period after moving up from Division II. They finished the season with a loss at Montana in the first round of the FCS playoffs.

== Schedule ==
Date	Time	Opponent	Rank	Site	Result	Attendance	Source
August 30	6:00 p.m.	Angelo State*		Bobcat Stadium; San Marcos, TX	W 21–14	13,952	
September 6	7:00 p.m.	at SMU*		Gerald J. Ford Stadium; University Park, TX	L 36–47	22,218	
September 20	2:45 p.m.	at Northern Colorado*		Nottingham Field; Greeley, CO	W 38–35	7,246	
September 27	6:00 p.m.	Southern Utah*		Bobcat Stadium; San Marcos, TX	L 20–34	12,301	
October 4	5:00 p.m.	Texas Southern*		Bobcat Stadium; San Marcos, TX	W 63–39	11,561	
October 11	7:00 p.m.	at No. 3 McNeese State		Cowboy Stadium; Lake Charles, LA	W 45–42	12,304	
October 18	3:00 p.m.	No. 13 Central Arkansas		Bobcat Stadium; San Marcos, TX	L 24–31	10,418	
October 25	2:00 p.m.	at Stephen F. Austin		Homer Bryce Stadium; Nacogdoches, TX	W 62–21	11,400	
November 1	2:00 p.m.	Northwestern State		Bobcat Stadium; San Marcos, TX	L 31–34 ^{OT}	9,100	
November 8	2:00 p.m.	at Southeastern Louisiana		Strawberry Stadium; Hammond, LA	W 38–24	3,267	
November 15	3:00 p.m.	Nicholls State		Bobcat Stadium; San Marcos, TX (Battle for the Paddle)	W 34–10	10,016	
November 22	2:00 p.m.	at Sam Houston State		Bowers Stadium; Huntsville, TX (rivalry)	W 45–42 ^{OT}	9,045	
November 29	1:00 p.m.	at No. 5 Montana*	No. 23	Washington–Grizzly Stadium; Missoula, MT (NCAA Division I First Round)	L 13–31	19,489	
*Non-conference game; Rankings from The Sports Network Poll released prior to the game; All times are in Central time

== Rankings ==
Ranking movements Legend: ██ Increase in ranking ██ Decrease in ranking — = Not ranked RV = Received votes
	Week														
Poll	Pre	1	2	3	4	5	6	7	8	9	10	11	12	13	Final
Sports Network	—	—	RV	—	—	—	RV	RV	RV	RV	RV	RV	RV	23	22
Coaches	—	—	RV	—	RV	—	—	RV	RV	RV	—	—	RV	RV	23

== Game summaries ==
=== Angelo State ===
	1	2	3	4	Total
Rams	0	7	7	0	14
Bobcats	7	0	0	14	21

=== At SMU ===
	1	2	3	4	Total
Bobcats	0	13	9	14	36
Mustangs	14	16	3	14	47

=== At Northern Colorado ===
	1	2	3	4	Total
Bobcats	21	7	7	3	38
Bears	14	7	14	0	35

=== Southern Utah ===
	1	2	3	4	Total
Thunderbirds	17	3	14	0	34
Bobcats	0	7	0	13	20

=== Texas Southern ===
	1	2	3	4	Total
Tigers	7	13	13	6	39
Bobcats	14	21	14	14	63

=== At No. 3 McNeese State ===
	1	2	3	4	Total
Bobcats	14	10	14	7	45
No. 3 Cowboys	14	0	6	22	42

=== No. 13 Central Arkansas ===
	1	2	3	4	Total
No. 13 Bears	7	14	0	10	31
Bobcats	0	14	0	10	24

=== At Stephen F. Austin ===
	1	2	3	4	Total
Bobcats	24	17	21	0	62
Lumberjacks	7	7	7	0	21

=== Northwestern State ===
	1	2	3	4	OT	Total
Demons	7	7	7	7	6	34
Bobcats	0	14	7	7	3	31

=== At Southeastern Louisiana ===
	1	2	3	4	Total
Bobcats	28	10	0	0	38
Lions	14	0	3	7	24

=== Nicholls State ===
	1	2	3	4	Total
Colonels	3	0	7	0	10
Bobcats	0	24	7	3	34

=== At Sam Houston State ===
	1	2	3	4	OT	Total
Bobcats	0	13	22	7	6	48
Bearkats	14	7	7	14	3	45

=== At No. 5 Montana (NCAA Division I First Round) ===
	1	2	3	4	Total
No. 23 Bobcats	10	0	3	0	13
No. 5 Grizzlies	0	7	14	10	31
