= 2010 Stephen F. Austin Lumberjacks football team =

American college football season

2010 Stephen F. Austin Lumberjacks football

Southland champion

FCS Playoffs Second Round, L 24–54 vs. Villanova
- Conference: Southland Conference

Ranking
- Sports Network: No. 8
- Record: 9–3 (6–1 Southland)
- Head coach: J. C. Harper (4th season)
- Offensive coordinator: Shannon Dawson (3rd season)
- Offensive scheme: Air raid
- Defensive coordinator: David Gibbs (3rd season)
- Base defense: Multiple
- Home stadium: Homer Bryce Stadium

2010 Southland Conference football standings
	Conf.			Overall
Team	W		L	W		L
No. 8 Stephen F. Austin $^	6	–	1	9	–	3
McNeese State	5	–	2	6	–	5
Central Arkansas	4	–	3	7	–	4
Sam Houston State	4	–	3	6	–	5
Northwestern State	4	–	3	5	–	6
Nicholls State	3	–	4	4	–	7
Texas State	1	–	6	4	–	7
Southeastern Louisiana	1	–	6	2	–	9
$ – Conference champion; ^ – FCS playoff participant; Rankings from The Sports Network poll

The 2010 Stephen F. Austin Lumberjacks football team represented Stephen F. Austin State University in the 2010 NCAA Division I FCS football season. The team was led by fourth-year head coach J. C. Harper and played its home games at Homer Bryce Stadium. It finished the regular season with a 9–3 record overall and a 6–1 record in the Southland Conference, making the team conference champions. The team qualified for the playoffs, in which it was eliminated in the second round by Villanova.

== Schedule ==
Date	Time	Opponent	Rank	Site	TV	Result	Attendance	Source
September 4	6:00 p.m.	at Texas A&M*	No. 8	Kyle Field; College Station, TX		L 7–48	81,287	
September 11	6:00 p.m.	Albany*	No. 10	Homer Bryce Stadium; Nacogdoches, TX		W 59–14	9,483	
September 18	4:05 p.m.	at No. 13 Northern Iowa*	No. 10	UNI-Dome; Cedar Falls, IA		W 22–20	12,260	
September 25	6:00 p.m.	Lamar*	No. 6	Homer Bryce Stadium; Nacogdoches, TX	KBTV	W 71–3	13,281	
October 9	7:00 p.m.	at McNeese State	No. 5	Cowboy Stadium; Lake Charles, LA		W 32–27	13,284	
October 16	2:00 p.m.	Central Arkansas	No. 5	Homer Bryce Stadium; Nacogdoches, TX		W 30–7	7,938	
October 23	2:00 p.m.	vs. Sam Houston State	No. 5	Reliant Stadium; Houston, TX (Battle of the Piney Woods)		W 31–28	24,685	
October 30	2:00 p.m.	Texas State	No. 4	Homer Bryce Stadium; Nacogdoches, TX		L 24–27	11,435	
November 6	4:00 p.m.	at Nicholls State	No. 10	John L. Guidry Stadium; Thibodaux, LA		W 48–13	3,007	
November 13	2:00 p.m.	Southeastern Louisiana	No. 8	Homer Bryce Stadium; Nacogdoches, TX		W 51–14	7,108	
November 20	2:00 p.m.	Northwestern State	No. 5	Homer Bryce Stadium; Nacogdoches, TX (Chief Caddo)		W 36–13	11,687	
December 4	2:30 p.m.	No. 10 Villanova*	No. 3	Homer Bryce Stadium; Nacogdoches, TX (NCAA Division I Second Round)	ESPN3	L 24–54	4,938	
*Non-conference game; Rankings from The Sports Network Poll released prior to the game; All times are in Central time
