= 2007 Central Arkansas Bears football team =

American college football season

2007 Central Arkansas Bears football
- Conference: Southland Conference
- Record: 6–5 (5–2 Southland)
- Head coach: Clint Conque (8th season)
- Offensive coordinator: Brooks Hollingsworth (4th season)
- Home stadium: Estes Stadium

2007 Southland Conference football standings
	Conf.			Overall
Team	W		L	W		L
No. 11 McNeese State $^	7	–	0	11	–	1
Sam Houston State	5	–	2	7	–	4
Central Arkansas*	5	–	2	6	–	5
Nicholls State	3	–	4	6	–	5
Texas State	3	–	4	4	–	7
Northwestern State	3	–	4	4	–	7
Southeastern Louisiana	2	–	5	3	–	8
Stephen F. Austin	0	–	7	0	–	11
$ – Conference champion; ^ – FCS playoff participant; * – Ineligible for postseason play due to transition from NCAA Division II; Rankings from The Sports Network poll

The 2007 Central Arkansas Bears football team represented the University of Central Arkansas as a member of the Southland Conference during the 2007 NCAA Division I FCS football season. Led by eighth-year head coach Clint Conque, the Bears compiled an overall record of 6–5 with a mark of 5–2 in conference play, tying for second place in the Southland. Central Arkansas played home games at Estes Stadium in Conway, Arkansas.

== Schedule ==
Date	Time	Opponent	Site	Result	Attendance	Source
September 1	6:00 pm	at Louisiana Tech*	Joe Aillet Stadium; Ruston, LA	L 7–28	20,240	
September 8	6:00 pm	at Northwestern State	Harry Turpin Stadium; Natchitoches, LA	L 28–31	10,258	
September 15	6:00 pm	UT Martin*	Estes Stadium; Conway, AR	W 48–34	10,837	
September 22	6:00 pm	at Missouri State*	Plaster Stadium; Springfield, MO	L 38–42	12,084	
October 6	6:00 pm	at No. 19 Sam Houston State	Bowers Stadium; Huntsville, TX	W 35–14	8,014	
October 11	7:00 pm	Texas State	Estes Stadium; Conway, AR	W 63–21	10,823	
October 20	6:00 pm	at Southeastern Louisiana	Strawberry Stadium; Hammond, LA	W 37–33	4,373	
October 27	6:00 pm	No. 18 Nicholls State	Estes Stadium; Conway, AR	W 49–42 ^{OT}	12,620	
November 3	6:00 pm	South Dakota State*	Estes Stadium; Conway, AR	L 10–38	8,860	
November 10	6:00 pm	Stephen F. Austin	Estes Stadium; Conway, AR	W 35–23	8,275	
November 17	7:00 pm	at No. 4 McNeese State	Cowboy Stadium; Lake Charles, LA (Red Beans and Rice Bowl)	L 14–41	11,135	
*Non-conference game; Rankings from The Sports Network Poll released prior to the game; All times are in Central time
