= 2010 Northwestern State Demons football team =

American college football season

2010 Northwestern State Demons football
- Conference: Southland Conference
- Record: 5–6 (4–3 Southland)
- Head coach: Bradley Dale Peveto (2nd season)
- Offensive coordinator: Todd Cooley (2nd season)
- Defensive coordinator: Brad Laird (6th season)
- Home stadium: Harry Turpin Stadium

2010 Southland Conference football standings
	Conf.			Overall
Team	W		L	W		L
No. 8 Stephen F. Austin $^	6	–	1	9	–	3
McNeese State	5	–	2	6	–	5
Central Arkansas	4	–	3	7	–	4
Sam Houston State	4	–	3	6	–	5
Northwestern State	4	–	3	5	–	6
Nicholls State	3	–	4	4	–	7
Texas State	1	–	6	4	–	7
Southeastern Louisiana	1	–	6	2	–	9
$ – Conference champion; ^ – FCS playoff participant; Rankings from The Sports Network poll

The 2010 Northwestern State Demons football team represented Northwestern State University as a member of the Southland Conference during the 2010 NCAA Division I FCS football season. Led by second-year head coach Bradley Dale Peveto, the Demons compiled an overall record of 5–6 with a mark of 4–3 in conference play, placing in a three-way tie for third in the Southland. Northwestern State played home games at Harry Turpin Stadium in Natchitoches, Louisiana.

== Schedule ==
Date	Time	Opponent	Site	TV	Result	Attendance	Source
September 4	1:00 pm	at Air Force*	Falcon Stadium; Colorado Springs, CO		L 21–65	40,236	
September 11	5:00 pm	Samford*	Harry Turpin Stadium; Natchitoches, LA		L 7–19	9,097	
September 18	6:00 pm	Tarleton State*	Harry Turpin Stadium; Natchitoches, LA		W 17–14		
September 25	4:00 pm	at North Dakota*	Alerus Center; North Dakota, ND	KSHV, Fox College Sports	L 24–49	7,966	
October 2	2:00 pm	McNeese State	Harry Turpin Stadium; Natchitoches, LA (rivalry)	SLC TV	L 7–24	7,848	
October 9	6:00 pm	at Central Arkansas	Estes Stadium; Conway, AR		W 24–19	8,722	
October 23	3:00 pm	at Texas State	Bobcat Stadium; San Marcos, TX	TSAA	W 16–3	14,008	
October 30	6:00 pm	Sam Houston State^{†}	Harry Turpin Stadium; Natchitoches, LA		W 23–20 ^{2OT}	9,151	
November 6	6:00 pm	at Southeastern Louisiana	Strawberry Stadium; Hammond, LA (rivalry)		W 35–16	3,951	
November 13	2:00 pm	Nicholls State	Manning Field at John L. Guidry Stadium; Thibodaux, LA (NSU Challenge)	SLC-TV	L 7–37	7,501	
November 20	2:00 pm	at No. 5 Stephen F. Austin	Homer Bryce Stadium; Nacogdoches, TX (Chief Caddo)		L 13–36	11,687	
*Non-conference game; ^{†}Homecoming; Rankings from The Sports Network Poll released prior to the game; All times are in Central time
