= 2010 Southeastern Louisiana Lions football team =

American college football season

2010 Southeastern Louisiana Lions football
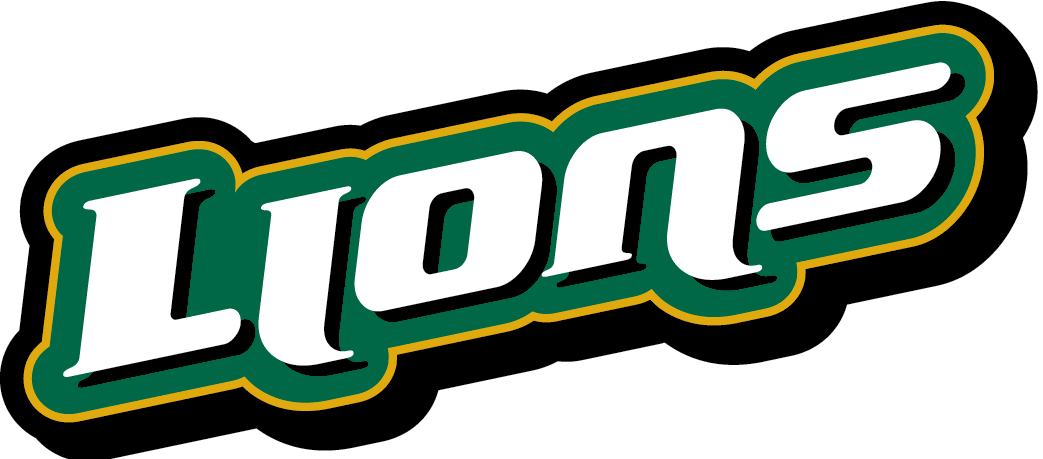
- Conference: Southland Conference
- Record: 2–9 (1–6 Southland)
- Head coach: Mike Lucas (4th season)
- Offensive coordinator: Allen Rudolph (4th overall; 1st as OC)
- Home stadium: Strawberry Stadium

2010 Southland Conference football standings
| | Conf. | | | Overall |
| Team | W | | L | W | | L |
|---|---|---|---|---|---|---|
| No. 8 Stephen F. Austin $^ | 6 | – | 1 | 9 | – | 3 |
| McNeese State | 5 | – | 2 | 6 | – | 5 |
| Central Arkansas | 4 | – | 3 | 7 | – | 4 |
| Sam Houston State | 4 | – | 3 | 6 | – | 5 |
| Northwestern State | 4 | – | 3 | 5 | – | 6 |
| Nicholls State | 3 | – | 4 | 4 | – | 7 |
| Texas State | 1 | – | 6 | 4 | – | 7 |
| Southeastern Louisiana | 1 | – | 6 | 2 | – | 9 |
$ – Conference champion; ^ – FCS playoff participant; Rankings from The Sports Network poll

The 2010 Southeastern Louisiana Lions football team represented Southeastern Louisiana University as a member of the Southland Conference during the 2010 NCAA Division I FCS football season. Led by fourth-year head coach Mike Lucas, the Lions compiled an overall record of 2–9 with a mark of 1–6 in conference play, tying for seventh place in the Southland. Southeastern Louisiana played home games at Strawberry Stadium in Hammond, Louisiana.

== Schedule ==
| Date | Time | Opponent | Site | TV | Result | Attendance | Source |
|---|---|---|---|---|---|---|---|
| September 2 | 7:00 pm | at Tulane* | Louisiana Superdome; New Orleans, LA | | L 21–27 | 20,258 | |
| September 11 | 6:00 pm | UT Martin* | Strawberry Stadium; Hammond, LA | | W 24–10 | 5,320 | |
| September 18 | 6:00 pm | Lamar* | Strawberry Stadium; Hammond, LA | | L 28–29 | 4,217 | |
| September 25 | 6:00 pm | at Louisiana–Monroe* | Malone Stadium; Monroe, LA | | L 20–21 | 15,285 | |
| October 9 | 2:00 pm | No. 17 Texas State | Strawberry Stadium; Hammond, LA | SLCTV | W 49–24 | 4,650 | |
| October 16 | 2:00 pm | at Sam Houston State | Bowers Stadium; Huntsville, TX | | L 7–57 | 7,457 | |
| October 23 | 6:00 pm | McNeese State | Strawberry Stadium; Hammond, LA | | L 10–23 | 5,720 | |
| October 30 | 2:00 pm | at Central Arkansas | Estes Stadium; Conway, AR | SLCTV | L 23–30 | 10,110 | |
| November 6 | 6:00 pm | Northwestern State | Strawberry Stadium; Hammond, LA (rivalry) | Southeastern Channel | L 16–35 | 3,951 | |
| November 13 | 2:00 pm | at No. 8 Stephen F. Austin | Homer Bryce Stadium; Nacogdoches, TX | | L 14–51 | 7,108 | |
| November 18 | 6:00 pm | at Nicholls State | John L. Guidry Stadium; Thibodaux, LA (River Bell Classic) | SLCTV | L 25–27 | 4,980 | |
*Non-conference game; Rankings from The Sports Network Poll released prior to the game; All times are in Central time
