= 2008 Northwestern State Demons football team =

American college football season

2008 Northwestern State Demons football
- Conference: Southland Conference
- Record: 7–5 (4–3 Southland)
- Head coach: Scott Stoker (7th season)
- Offensive coordinator: Slade Nagle (3rd season)
- Defensive coordinator: Brad Laird (4th season)
- Home stadium: Harry Turpin Stadium

2008 Southland Conference football standings
	Conf.			Overall
Team	W		L	W		L
No. 12 Central Arkansas* $	6	–	1	10	–	2
No. 22 Texas State ^	5	–	2	8	–	5
McNeese State	4	–	3	7	–	3
Northwestern State	4	–	3	7	–	5
Nicholls State	3	–	4	3	–	6
Southeastern Louisiana	2	–	5	5	–	7
Sam Houston State	2	–	5	4	–	6
Stephen F. Austin	2	–	5	4	–	8
$ – Conference champion; ^ – FCS playoff participant; * – Ineligible for postseason play due to transition from NCAA Division II; Rankings from The Sports Network poll

The 2008 Northwestern State Demons football team represented Northwestern State University as a member of the Southland Conference during the 2008 NCAA Division I FCS football season. Led by seventh-year head coach Scott Stoker, the Demons compiled an overall record of 7–5 with a mark of 4–3 in conference play, tying for third place in the Southland. Northwestern State played home games at Harry Turpin Stadium in Natchitoches, Louisiana.

== Schedule ==
Date	Time	Opponent	Site	TV	Result	Attendance	Source
August 30	6:00 pm	Texas A&M–Commerce*	Harry Turpin Stadium; Natchitoches, LA		W 30–14	9,294	
September 6	6:00 pm	at Baylor*	Floyd Casey Stadium; Waco, TX		L 6–51	36,258	
September 13	2:00 pm	Grambling State*	Harry Turpin Stadium; Natchitoches, LA		W 31–19	8,752	
September 20	6:00 pm	No. 13 Cal Poly*	Harry Turpin Stadium; Natchitoches, LA		L 18–52	8,284	
September 27	6:00 pm	Southeastern Oklahoma State*	Harry Turpin Stadium; Natchitoches, LA		W 63–12	7,421	
October 11	6:00 pm	Nicholls State	Harry Turpin Stadium; Natchitoches, LA (NSU Challenge)		W 36–28	7,922	
October 18	6:00 pm	at Southeastern Louisiana	Strawberry Stadium; Hammond, LA (rivalry)		L 21–26	7,162	
October 25	2:00 pm	Sam Houston State^{†}	Harry Turpin Stadium; Natchitoches, LA		W 24–16	8,922	
November 1	3:00 pm	at Texas State	Bobcat Stadium; San Marcos, TX	TSAA	W 34–31 ^{OT}	9,100	
November 8	4:00 pm	at No. 16 Central Arkansas	Estes Stadium; Conway, AR		L 6–42	9,767	
November 15	6:00 pm	No. 16 McNeese State	Harry Turpin Stadium; Natchitoches, LA (rivalry)	SCTN	L 17–24	9,710	
November 22	6:00 pm	at Stephen F. Austin	Homer Bryce Stadium; Nacogdoches, TX (Chief Caddo)		W 34–24	7,358	
*Non-conference game; ^{†}Homecoming; Rankings from The Sports Network Poll released prior to the game; All times are in Central time
