= 2008 Southeastern Louisiana Lions football team =

American college football season

2008 Southeastern Louisiana Lions football
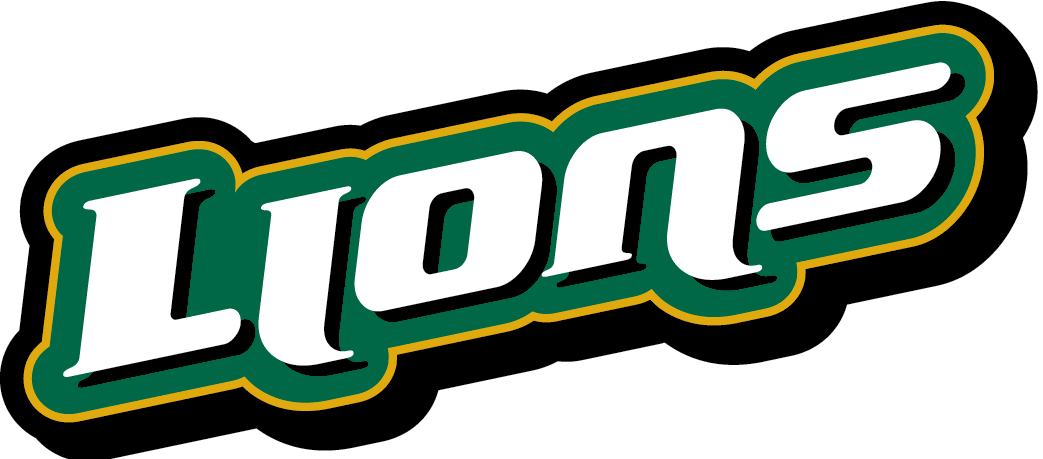
- Conference: Southland Conference
- Record: 5–7 (2–5 Southland)
- Head coach: Mike Lucas (2nd season)
- Offensive coordinator: Tommy Condell (2nd season)
- Home stadium: Strawberry Stadium

2008 Southland Conference football standings
	Conf.			Overall
Team	W		L	W		L
No. 12 Central Arkansas* $	6	–	1	10	–	2
No. 22 Texas State ^	5	–	2	8	–	5
McNeese State	4	–	3	7	–	3
Northwestern State	4	–	3	7	–	5
Nicholls State	3	–	4	3	–	6
Southeastern Louisiana	2	–	5	5	–	7
Sam Houston State	2	–	5	4	–	6
Stephen F. Austin	2	–	5	4	–	8
$ – Conference champion; ^ – FCS playoff participant; * – Ineligible for postseason play due to transition from NCAA Division II; Rankings from The Sports Network poll

The 2008 Southeastern Louisiana Lions football team represented Southeastern Louisiana University as a member of the Southland Conference during the 2008 NCAA Division I FCS football season. Led by second-year head coach Mike Lucas, the Lions compiled an overall record of 5–7 with a mark of 2–5 in conference play, placing in a three-way tie for sixth in the Southland. Southeastern Louisiana played home games at Strawberry Stadium in Hammond, Louisiana.

== Schedule ==
Date	Time	Opponent	Site	TV	Result	Attendance	Source
August 30	5:00 pm	at Alcorn State*	Jack Spinks Stadium; Lorman, MS		W 34–28	7,500	
September 6	6:00 pm	at Mississippi State*	Davis Wade Stadium; Starkville, MS		L 10–34	41,938	
September 13	6:00 pm	South Dakota*	Strawberry Stadium; Hammond, LA		W 31–30	5,346	
September 20	6:00 pm	at Louisiana Tech*	Joe Aillet Stadium; Ruston, LA		L 26–41	17,623	
September 27	6:00 pm	North Dakota*	Strawberry Stadium; Hammond, LA		W 38–35	5,216	
October 4	6:00 pm	at Stephen F. Austin	Homer Bryce Stadium; Nacogdoches, TX		L 45–48	7,230	
October 18	6:00 pm	Northwestern State	Strawberry Stadium; Hammond, LA (rivalry)	Southeastern Channel	W 26–21	7,162	
October 25	6:00 pm	at No. 13 Central Arkansas	Estes Stadium; Conway, AR		L 21–28	9,113	
November 1	6:00 pm	No. 20 McNeese State	Strawberry Stadium; Hammond, LA	Southeastern Channel	L 14–24	6,212	
November 8	2:00 pm	Texas State	Strawberry Stadium; Hammond, LA	SCTN	L 24–38	3,267	
November 15	6:00 pm	at Sam Houston State	Bowers Stadium; Huntsville, TX		W 30–27 ^{OT}	7,027	
November 22	1:00 pm	at Nicholls State	John L. Guidry Stadium; Thibodaux, LA (River Bell Classic)	SCTN	L 28–35	7,352	
*Non-conference game; Rankings from The Sports Network Poll released prior to the game; All times are in Central time
