= 2007 Texas State Bobcats football team =

American college football season

2007 Texas State Bobcats football
- Conference: Southland Conference
- Record: 4–7 (3–4 SLC)
- Head coach: Brad Wright (1st season)
- Co-offensive coordinators: Ben Norton (1st season); Travis Bush (1st season)
- Offensive scheme: Multiple
- Base defense: 3–4
- Home stadium: Bobcat Stadium

2007 Southland Conference football standings
	Conf.			Overall
Team	W		L	W		L
No. 11 McNeese State $^	7	–	0	11	–	1
Sam Houston State	5	–	2	7	–	4
Central Arkansas*	5	–	2	6	–	5
Nicholls State	3	–	4	6	–	5
Texas State	3	–	4	4	–	7
Northwestern State	3	–	4	4	–	7
Southeastern Louisiana	2	–	5	3	–	8
Stephen F. Austin	0	–	7	0	–	11
$ – Conference champion; ^ – FCS playoff participant; * – Ineligible for postseason play due to transition from NCAA Division II; Rankings from The Sports Network poll

The 2007 Texas State Bobcats football team was an American football team that represented Texas State University–San Marcos (now known as Texas State University) during the 2007 NCAA Division I FCS football season as a member of the Southland Conference (SLC). In their first year under head coach Brad Wright, the team compiled an overall record of 4–7 with a mark of 3–4 in conference play.

== Schedule ==
Date	Time	Opponent	Site	Result	Attendance	Source
September 1		No. 15 Cal Poly*	Bobcat Stadium; San Marcos, TX	W 38–35	13,007	
September 8	6:00 p.m.	No. 24 Abilene Christian*	Bobcat Stadium; San Marcos, TX	L 27–45	12,726	
September 15	6:00 p.m.	at Baylor*	Floyd Casey Stadium; Waco, TX	L 27–34	36,274	
September 22		at South Dakota State*	Coughlin–Alumni Stadium; Brookings, SD	L 3–38	14,920	
October 6		No. 6 McNeese State	Bobcat Stadium; San Marcos, TX	L 20–41	13,171	
October 11	7:00 p.m.	at Central Arkansas	Estes Stadium; Conway, AR	L 21–63	10,823	
October 20	3:30 p.m.	Stephen F. Austin	Bobcat Stadium; San Marcos, TX	W 52–29	10,218	
October 27	2:00 p.m.	at Northwestern State	Harry Turpin Stadium; Natchitoches, LA	W 20–17	9,156	
November 3	6:00 p.m.	Southeastern Louisiana	Bobcat Stadium; San Marcos, TX	W 45–31	9,981	
November 10	2:00 p.m.	at Nicholls State	John L. Guidry Stadium; Thibodaux, LA (Battle for the Paddle)	L 28–52	5,154	
November 15		Sam Houston State	Bobcat Stadium; San Marcos, TX (rivalry)	L 28–29	9,346	
*Non-conference game; Rankings from The Sports Network Poll released prior to the game; All times are in Central time
