= 2007 Sam Houston State Bearkats football team =

American college football season

2007 Sam Houston State Bearkats football
- Conference: Southland Conference
- Record: 7–4 (5–2 Southland)
- Head coach: Todd Whitten (3rd season)
- Home stadium: Bowers Stadium

2007 Southland Conference football standings
	Conf.			Overall
Team	W		L	W		L
No. 11 McNeese State $^	7	–	0	11	–	1
Sam Houston State	5	–	2	7	–	4
Central Arkansas*	5	–	2	6	–	5
Nicholls State	3	–	4	6	–	5
Texas State	3	–	4	4	–	7
Northwestern State	3	–	4	4	–	7
Southeastern Louisiana	2	–	5	3	–	8
Stephen F. Austin	0	–	7	0	–	11
$ – Conference champion; ^ – FCS playoff participant; * – Ineligible for postseason play due to transition from NCAA Division II; Rankings from The Sports Network poll

The 2007 Sam Houston State Bearkats football team represented Sam Houston State University as a member of the Southland Conference during the 2007 NCAA Division I FCS football season. Led by third-year head coach Todd Whitten, the Bearkats compiled an overall record of 7–4 with a mark of 5–2 in conference play, and finished tied for second in the Southland.

== Schedule ==
Date	Time	Opponent	Rank	Site	Result	Attendance	Source
August 30		Angelo State*		Bowers Stadium; Huntsville, TX	W 17–13	10,517	
September 8		Arkansas–Monticello*	No. 16	Bowers Stadium; Huntsville, TX	W 48–10	8,748	
September 15	6:00 p.m.	at No. 5 North Dakota State*	No. 16	Fargodome; Fargo, ND	L 38–41	18,961	
September 29	6:00 p.m.	at Oklahoma State*	No. 15	Boone Pickens Stadium; Stillwater, OK	L 3–39	41,139	
October 6	6:00 p.m.	Central Arkansas	No. 19	Bowers Stadium; Huntsville, TX	L 14–35	8,014	
October 13		at No. 6 McNeese State		Cowboy Stadium; Lake Charles, LA	L 21–31	13,060	
October 20	2:00 p.m.	Northwestern State		Bowers Stadium; Huntsville, TX	W 42–20	10,142	
October 27	2:00 p.m.	at Stephen F. Austin		Homer Bryce Stadium; Nacogdoches, TX (Battle of the Piney Woods)	W 45–17	9,467	
November 3	6:00 p.m.	No. 24 Nicholls State		Bowers Stadium; Huntsville, TX	W 16–13	10,716	
November 10	6:00 p.m.	at Southeastern Louisiana		Strawberry Stadium; Hammond, LA	W 20–6	6,404	
November 15		at Texas State		Bobcat Stadium; San Marcos, TX (rivalry)	W 29–28	9,346	
*Non-conference game; Rankings from The Sports Network Poll released prior to the game; All times are in Central time
