= 2007 Stephen F. Austin Lumberjacks football team =

American college football season

2007 Stephen F. Austin Lumberjacks football
- Conference: Southland Conference
- Record: 0–11 (0–7 Southland)
- Head coach: J. C. Harper (1st season)
- Home stadium: Homer Bryce Stadium

2007 Southland Conference football standings
	Conf.			Overall
Team	W		L	W		L
No. 11 McNeese State $^	7	–	0	11	–	1
Sam Houston State	5	–	2	7	–	4
Central Arkansas*	5	–	2	6	–	5
Nicholls State	3	–	4	6	–	5
Texas State	3	–	4	4	–	7
Northwestern State	3	–	4	4	–	7
Southeastern Louisiana	2	–	5	3	–	8
Stephen F. Austin	0	–	7	0	–	11
$ – Conference champion; ^ – FCS playoff participant; * – Ineligible for postseason play due to transition from NCAA Division II; Rankings from The Sports Network poll

The 2007 Stephen F. Austin Lumberjacks football team represented Stephen F. Austin State University as a member of the Southland Conference during the 2007 NCAA Division I FCS football season. Led by first-year head coach J. C. Harper, the Lumberjacks compiled an overall record of 0–11 with a mark of 0–7 in conference play, placing in last place in the Southland. Stephen F. Austin played home games at Homer Bryce Stadium in Nacogdoches, Texas.

== Schedule ==
Date	Time	Opponent	Site	Result	Attendance	Source
September 1	6:00 p.m.	Tarleton State*	Homer Bryce Stadium; Nacogdoches, TX	L 24–27 ^{OT}	8,192	
September 8	6:35 p.m.	at No. 4 North Dakota State*	Fargodome; Fargo, ND	L 19–28	18,823	
September 22	6:00 p.m.	No. 19 Western Illinois*	Homer Bryce Stadium; Nacogdoches, TX	L 13–34	10,653	
September 29	2:00 p.m.	at South Dakota State*	Coughlin–Alumni Stadium; Brookings, SD	L 0–45	15,338	
October 6	6:00 p.m.	at Southeastern Louisiana	Strawberry Stadium; Hammond, LA	L 3–21	3,460	
October 13	6:00 p.m.	No. 14 Nicholls State	Homer Bryce Stadium; Nacogdoches, TX	L 16–17	7,243	
October 20	3:30 p.m.	at Texas State	Bobcat Stadium; San Marcos, TX	L 29–52	10,218	
October 27	2:00 p.m.	Sam Houston State	Homer Bryce Stadium; Nacogdoches, TX (Battle of the Piney Woods)	L 17–45	9,467	
November 3	6:00 p.m.	No. 5 McNeese State	Homer Bryce Stadium; Nacogdoches, TX	L 20–49	6,845	
November 10	6:00 p.m.	at Central Arkansas	Estes Stadium; Conway, AR	L 23–35	8,275	
November 17	2:00 p.m.	at Northwestern State	Harry Turpin Stadium; Natchitoches, LA (Chief Caddo)	L 12–31	4,222	
*Non-conference game; Rankings from The Sports Network Poll released prior to the game; All times are in Central time
