= 2010 Central Arkansas Bears football team =

American college football season

2010 Central Arkansas Bears football
- Conference: Southland Conference
- Record: 7–4 (4–3 Southland)
- Head coach: Clint Conque (11th season)
- Offensive coordinator: Brooks Hollingsworth (7th season)
- Defensive coordinator: Matt Williamson (1st season)
- Home stadium: Estes Stadium

2010 Southland Conference football standings
	Conf.			Overall
Team	W		L	W		L
No. 8 Stephen F. Austin $^	6	–	1	9	–	3
McNeese State	5	–	2	6	–	5
Central Arkansas	4	–	3	7	–	4
Sam Houston State	4	–	3	6	–	5
Northwestern State	4	–	3	5	–	6
Nicholls State	3	–	4	4	–	7
Texas State	1	–	6	4	–	7
Southeastern Louisiana	1	–	6	2	–	9
$ – Conference champion; ^ – FCS playoff participant; Rankings from The Sports Network poll

The 2010 Central Arkansas Bears football team represented the University of Central Arkansas as a member of the Southland Conference during the 2010 NCAA Division I FCS football season. Led by 11th-year head coach Clint Conque, the Bears compiled an overall record of 7–4 with a mark of 4–3 in conference play, and finished tied for third in the Southland.

== Schedule ==
Date	Time	Opponent	Site	TV	Result	Attendance	Source
September 2	7:00 pm	Elizabeth City State*	Estes Stadium; Conway, AR		W 47–20	9,121	
September 11	1:30 pm	at Eastern Illinois*	O'Brien Field; Charleston, IL	WEIU	W 37–7	5,529	
September 18	6:00 pm	Murray State*	Estes Stadium; Conway, AR		W 21–20	12,088	
September 25	6:00 pm	at Tulsa*	Skelly Field at H. A. Chapman Stadium; Tulsa, OK		L 14–41	21,928	
October 9	6:00 pm	Northwestern State	Estes Stadium; Conway, AR		L 19–24	8,722	
October 16	2:00 pm	at No. 5 Stephen F. Austin	Homer Bryce Stadium; Nacogdoches, TX	SLC TV	L 7–30	7,938	
October 23	4:00 pm	at Nicholls State	John L. Guidry Stadium; Thibodaux, LA		W 31–7	4,268	
October 30	2:00 pm	Southeastern Louisiana^{†}	Estes Stadium; Conway, AR	SLC TV	W 30–23	10,110	
November 6	2:00 pm	at Texas State	Bobcat Stadium; San Marcos, TX	SLC TV	W 49–17	10,120	
November 13	3:00 pm	Sam Houston State	Estes Stadium; Conway, AR		L 13–20	6,214	
November 20	3:00 pm	McNeese State	Estes Stadium; Conway, AR (Red Beans and Rice Bowl)		W 28–24	5,466	
*Non-conference game; ^{†}Homecoming; Rankings from The Sports Network Poll released prior to the game; All times are in Central time
