= 2010 Texas State Bobcats football team =

American college football season

2010 Texas State Bobcats football
- Conference: Southland Conference
- Record: 4–7 (1–6 Southland)
- Head coach: Brad Wright (4th season)
- Offensive coordinator: Slade Nagle (1st season)
- Co-offensive coordinators: Ben Norton (4th season); Travis Bush (4th season)
- Offensive scheme: Multiple
- Base defense: 3–4
- Home stadium: Bobcat Stadium

2010 Southland Conference football standings
	Conf.			Overall
Team	W		L	W		L
No. 8 Stephen F. Austin $^	6	–	1	9	–	3
McNeese State	5	–	2	6	–	5
Central Arkansas	4	–	3	7	–	4
Sam Houston State	4	–	3	6	–	5
Northwestern State	4	–	3	5	–	6
Nicholls State	3	–	4	4	–	7
Texas State	1	–	6	4	–	7
Southeastern Louisiana	1	–	6	2	–	9
$ – Conference champion; ^ – FCS playoff participant; Rankings from The Sports Network poll

The 2010 Texas State Bobcats football team represented Texas State University–San Marcos in the 2010 NCAA Division I FCS football season. The Bobcats were led by fourth year head coach Brad Wright, played their home games at Bobcat Stadium as a member of the Southland Conference. They finished the season with a record of four wins and seven losses (4–7, 1–6 Southland).

== Schedule ==
Date	Time	Opponent	Rank	Site	TV	Result	Attendance
September 4	7:00 pm	at Houston*		Robertson Stadium; Houston, TX		L 28–68	32,119
September 11	6:00 pm	Southern Arkansas*		Bobcat Stadium; San Marcos, TX	TSAA	W 31–17	13,727
September 18	6:00 pm	No. 17 Cal Poly*		Bobcat Stadium; San Marcos, TX	TSAA	W 21–12	12,236
September 25	6:00 pm	Southern Utah*		Bobcat Stadium; San Marcos, TX	TSAA	W 42–28	13,742
October 9	2:00 pm	at Southeastern Louisiana	No. 17	Strawberry Stadium; Hammond, LA	SLCTV	L 24–49	4,650
October 16	6:00 pm	Nicholls State		Bobcat Stadium; San Marcos, TX (Battle for the Paddle)	TSAA	L 45–47 ^{4OT}	12,994
October 23	3:00 pm	Northwestern State^{†}		Bobcat Stadium; San Marcos, TX	TSAA	L 3–16	14,008
October 30	2:00 pm	at No. 4 Stephen F. Austin		Homer Bryce Stadium; Nacogdoches, TX		W 27–24	11,435
November 6	2:00 pm	Central Arkansas		Bobcat Stadium; San Marcos, TX	SLCTV	L 17–49	10,120
November 13	7:00 pm	at McNeese State		Cowboy Stadium; Lake Charles, LA		L 6–36	11,363
November 20	2:00 pm	at Sam Houston State		Bowers Stadium; Huntsville, TX (rivalry)		L 29–31	5,631
*Non-conference game; ^{†}Homecoming; Rankings from The Sports Network Poll released prior to the game; All times are in Central time

== Rankings ==
Ranking movements Legend: ██ Increase in ranking ██ Decrease in ranking — = Not ranked RV = Received votes
	Week													
Poll	Pre	1	2	3	4	5	6	7	8	9	10	11	12	Final
Sports Network	RV	RV	RV	RV	20	17	RV	RV	—	—	—	—	—	—
Coaches	RV	RV	RV	23	18	15	22	RV	—	—	—	—	—	—

== Game summaries ==
=== At Houston ===
	1	2	3	4	Total
Bobcats	7	0	7	14	28
Cougars	20	34	14	0	68

Statistics	TXST	HOU
First downs	24	22
Total yards	345	497
Rushing yards	180	151
Passing yards	165	346
Turnovers	4	2
Time of possession	43:01	16:59

Team	Category	Player	Statistics
Texas State	Passing	Tyler Arndt	14/22, 153 yards, TD, INT
Texas State	Rushing	Karrington Bush	19 rushes, 73 yards
Texas State	Receiving	Damarcus Griggs	6 receptions, 85 yards
Houston	Passing	Case Keenum	17/22, 274 yards, 5 TD, 2 INT
Houston	Rushing	Austin Elrod	1 rush, 52 yards
Houston	Receiving	Patrick Edwards	4 receptions, 80 yards, TD
