= 2010 McNeese State Cowboys football team =

American college football season

2010 McNeese State Cowboys football
- Conference: Southland Conference
- Record: 6–5 (5–2 Southland)
- Head coach: Matt Viator (5th season)
- Co-offensive coordinators: Broderick Fobbs (4th season); Tim Leger (4th season)
- Home stadium: Cowboy Stadium

2010 Southland Conference football standings
	Conf.			Overall
Team	W		L	W		L
No. 8 Stephen F. Austin $^	6	–	1	9	–	3
McNeese State	5	–	2	6	–	5
Central Arkansas	4	–	3	7	–	4
Sam Houston State	4	–	3	6	–	5
Northwestern State	4	–	3	5	–	6
Nicholls State	3	–	4	4	–	7
Texas State	1	–	6	4	–	7
Southeastern Louisiana	1	–	6	2	–	9
$ – Conference champion; ^ – FCS playoff participant; Rankings from The Sports Network poll

The 2010 McNeese State Cowboys football team represented McNeese State University as a member of the Southland Conference during the 2010 NCAA Division I FCS football season. Led by fifth-year head coach Matt Viator, the Cowboys compiled an overall record of 6–5 with a mark of 5–2 in conference play, placing second in the Southland. McNeese State played home games at Cowboy Stadium in Lake Charles, Louisiana.

== Schedule ==
Date	Opponent	Rank	Site	TV	Result	Attendance	Source
September 4	Lamar*	No. 12	Cowboy Stadium; Lake Charles, LA (Battle of the Border)		W 30–27	19,235	
September 11	at Missouri*	No. 13	Faurot Field; Columbia, MO	FSN	L 6–50	55,582	
September 25	No. 20 Cal Poly*	No. 19	Cowboy Stadium; Lake Charles, LA		L 14–40	11,958	
October 2	at Northwestern State		Harry Turpin Stadium; Natchitoches, LA (rivalry)		W 24–7	7,848	
October 9	No. 5 Stephen F. Austin		Cowboy Stadium; Lake Charles, LA		L 27–32	13,284	
October 16	at No. 9 (FBS) LSU*		Tiger Stadium; Baton Rouge, LA	FSN	L 10–32	92,576	
October 23	at Southeastern Louisiana		Strawberry Stadium; Hammond, LA		W 13–10	5,720	
October 30	Nicholls State		Cowboy Stadium; Lake Charles, LA		W 24–14	13,012	
November 6	at Sam Houston State		Bowers Stadium; Huntsville, TX		W 33–28	4,228	
November 13	Texas State		Cowboy Stadium; Lake Charles, LA		W 36–6	11,363	
November 20	at Central Arkansas		Estes Stadium; Conway, AR (Red Beans and Rice Bowl)		L 24–28	5,466	
*Non-conference game; Rankings from The Sports Network Poll released prior to the game
