= 2008 Stephen F. Austin Lumberjacks football team =

American college football season

2008 Stephen F. Austin Lumberjacks football
- Conference: Southland Conference
- Record: 4–8 (2–5 Southland)
- Head coach: J. C. Harper (2nd season)
- Offensive coordinator: Shannon Dawson (1st season)
- Defensive coordinator: David Gibbs (1st season)
- Home stadium: Homer Bryce Stadium

2008 Southland Conference football standings
	Conf.			Overall
Team	W		L	W		L
No. 12 Central Arkansas* $	6	–	1	10	–	2
No. 22 Texas State ^	5	–	2	8	–	5
McNeese State	4	–	3	7	–	3
Northwestern State	4	–	3	7	–	5
Nicholls State	3	–	4	3	–	6
Southeastern Louisiana	2	–	5	5	–	7
Sam Houston State	2	–	5	4	–	6
Stephen F. Austin	2	–	5	4	–	8
$ – Conference champion; ^ – FCS playoff participant; * – Ineligible for postseason play due to transition from NCAA Division II; Rankings from The Sports Network poll

The 2008 Stephen F. Austin Lumberjacks football team represented Stephen F. Austin State University as a member of the Southland Conference during the 2008 NCAA Division I FCS football season. Led by second-year head coach J. C. Harper, the Lumberjacks compiled an overall record of 4–8 with a mark of 2–5 in conference play, placing in a three-way tie for sixth in the Southland. Stephen F. Austin played home games at Homer Bryce Stadium in Nacogdoches, Texas.

== Schedule ==
Date	Time	Opponent	Site	Result	Attendance	Source
August 30	6:00 p.m.	Langston*	Homer Bryce Stadium; Nacogdoches, TX	W 56–19	8,201	
September 6	6:00 p.m.	at TCU*	Amon G. Carter Stadium; Fort Worth, TX	L 7–67	27,074	
September 20	6:05 p.m.	at No. 20 Western Illinois*	Hanson Field; Macomb, IL	L 14–34	14,319	
September 27	6:00 p.m.	No. 20 South Dakota State*	Homer Bryce Stadium; Nacogdoches, TX	L 48–50	9,623	
October 4	6:00 p.m.	Southeastern Louisiana	Homer Bryce Stadium; Nacogdoches, TX	W 48–45	7,230	
October 11	6:00 p.m.	Kentucky Wesleyan*	Homer Bryce Stadium; Nacogdoches, TX	W 49–0	8,763	
October 18	2:00 p.m.	at Nicholls State	John L. Guidry Stadium; Thibodaux, LA	W 50–39	5,892	
October 25	2:00 p.m.	Texas State	Homer Bryce Stadium; Nacogdoches, TX	L 21–62	11,400	
November 1	2:00 p.m.	at Sam Houston State	Bowers Stadium; Huntsville, TX (Battle of the Piney Woods)	L 31–34 ^{2OT}	10,134	
November 8	7:00 p.m.	at No. 18 McNeese State	Cowboy Stadium; Lake Charles, LA	L 31–42	13,025	
November 15	6:00 p.m.	No. 15 Central Arkansas	Homer Bryce Stadium; Nacogdoches, TX	L 41–49	7,467	
November 22	2:00 p.m.	Northwestern State	Homer Bryce Stadium; Nacogdoches, TX (Chief Caddo)	L 24–34	7,358	
*Non-conference game; Rankings from The Sports Network Poll released prior to the game; All times are in Central time
