= 2008 Nicholls State Colonels football team =

American college football season

2008 Nicholls State Colonels football
- Conference: Southland Conference
- Record: 3–6 (3–4 Southland)
- Head coach: Jay Thomas (5th season)
- Offensive coordinator: H. T. Kinney (5th season)
- Offensive scheme: Spread option
- Defensive coordinator: Steve Ellis (3rd season)
- Base defense: Multiple 4–3
- Home stadium: John L. Guidry Stadium

2008 Southland Conference football standings
	Conf.			Overall
Team	W		L	W		L
No. 12 Central Arkansas* $	6	–	1	10	–	2
No. 22 Texas State ^	5	–	2	8	–	5
McNeese State	4	–	3	7	–	3
Northwestern State	4	–	3	7	–	5
Nicholls State	3	–	4	3	–	6
Southeastern Louisiana	2	–	5	5	–	7
Sam Houston State	2	–	5	4	–	6
Stephen F. Austin	2	–	5	4	–	8
$ – Conference champion; ^ – FCS playoff participant; * – Ineligible for postseason play due to transition from NCAA Division II; Rankings from The Sports Network poll

The 2008 Nicholls State Colonels football team represented Nicholls State University as a member of the Southland Conference during the 2008 NCAA Division I FCS football season. Led by fifth-year head Jay Thomas, the Colonels compiled an overall record of 3–6 with a mark of 3–4 in conference play, placing fifth in the Southland. Nicholls State played home games at John L. Guidry Stadium in Thibodaux, Louisiana.

== Schedule ==
Date	Time	Opponent	Site	TV	Result	Attendance	Source
September 4	7:00 p.m.	at New Mexico State*	Aggie Memorial Stadium; Las Cruces, NM		Cancelled		
September 13	6:00 p.m.	Bowie State*	John L. Guidry Stadium; Thibodaux, LA		Cancelled		
September 20	7:00 p.m.	at Memphis*	Liberty Bowl; Memphis, TN		L 10–31	22,167	
October 2	6:34 p.m.	at No. 10 Northern Iowa*	UNI-Dome; Cedar Falls, IA	ESPNU	L 14–34	9,028	
October 11	6:00 p.m.	at Northwestern State	Harry Turpin Stadium; Natchitoches, LA (NSU Challenge)		L 28–36	7,922	
October 18	2:00 p.m.	Stephen F. Austin	John L. Guidry Stadium; Thibodaux, LA		L 39–50	5,892	
October 25	7:00 p.m.	at No. 11 McNeese State	Cowboy Stadium; Lake Charles, LA		W 38–35	14,635	
November 1	1:00 p.m.	No. 11 Central Arkansas	John L. Guidry Stadium; Thibodaux, LA		W 20–17	6,197	
November 8	4:00 p.m.	Sam Houston State	John L. Guidry Stadium; Thibodaux, LA		L 37–47	4,032	
November 15	3:00 p.m.	at Texas State	Bobcat Stadium; San Marcos, TX (Battle for the Paddle)		L 10–34	10,016	
November 22	1:00 p.m.	Southeastern Louisiana	John L. Guidry Stadium; Thibodaux, LA (River Bell Classic)	SCTN	W 35–28	7,352	
*Non-conference game; Rankings from The Sports Network Poll released prior to the game; All times are in Central time

The games against New Mexico State and Bowie State were cancelled due to Hurricanes Gustav and Ike.
