= 2007 Northwestern State Demons football team =

American college football season

2007 Northwestern State Demons football
- Conference: Southland Conference
- Record: 4–7 (3–4 Southland)
- Head coach: Scott Stoker (6th season)
- Offensive coordinator: Slade Nagle (2nd season)
- Home stadium: Harry Turpin Stadium

2007 Southland Conference football standings
	Conf.			Overall
Team	W		L	W		L
No. 11 McNeese State $^	7	–	0	11	–	1
Sam Houston State	5	–	2	7	–	4
Central Arkansas*	5	–	2	6	–	5
Nicholls State	3	–	4	6	–	5
Texas State	3	–	4	4	–	7
Northwestern State	3	–	4	4	–	7
Southeastern Louisiana	2	–	5	3	–	8
Stephen F. Austin	0	–	7	0	–	11
$ – Conference champion; ^ – FCS playoff participant; * – Ineligible for postseason play due to transition from NCAA Division II; Rankings from The Sports Network poll

The 2007 Northwestern State Demons football team represented Northwestern State University as a member of the Southland Conference during the 2007 NCAA Division I FCS football season. Led by sixth-year head coach Scott Stoker, the Demons compiled an overall record of 4–7 with a mark of 3–4 in conference play, tying for fourth place in the Southland. Northwestern State played home games at Harry Turpin Stadium in Natchitoches, Louisiana.

== Schedule ==
Date	Time	Opponent	Site	TV	Result	Attendance	Source
September 1	6:00 pm	Henderson State*	Harry Turpin Stadium; Natchitoches, LA		W 41–6	8,218	
September 8	6:00 pm	Central Arkansas	Harry Turpin Stadium; Natchitoches, LA		W 31–28	10,258	
September 15	12:30 pm	at Northeastern*	Parsons Field; Brookline, MA		L 14–42	1,210	
September 29	6:00 pm	at Texas Tech*	Jones AT&T Stadium; Lubbock, TX		L 7–75	52,893	
October 6	2:00 pm	at No. 17 Nicholls State	John L. Guidry Stadium; Thibodaux, LA (NSU Challenge)		L 0–58	4,912	
October 13	2:30 pm	Southeastern Louisiana	Harry Turpin Stadium; Natchitoches, LA (rivalry)		W 27–24	8,029	
October 20	2:00 pm	at Sam Houston State	Bowers Stadium; Huntsville, TX		L 20–42	10,142	
October 27	2:00 pm	Texas State^{†}	Harry Turpin Stadium; Natchitoches, LA	TSAA	L 17–20	9,156	
November 3	1:00 pm	at Ole Miss*	Vaught–Hemingway Stadium; Oxford, MS		L 31–38	23,283	
November 10	7:00 pm	at No. 4 McNeese State	Cowboy Stadium; Lake Charles, LA (rivalry)	SCTN	L 21–27	13,413	
November 17	2:00 pm	Stephen F. Austin	Harry Turpin Stadium; Natchitoches, LA (Chief Caddo)		W 31–12	4,222	
*Non-conference game; ^{†}Homecoming; Rankings from The Sports Network Poll released prior to the game; All times are in Central time
