= 2007 Southeastern Louisiana Lions football team =

American college football season

2007 Southeastern Louisiana Lions football
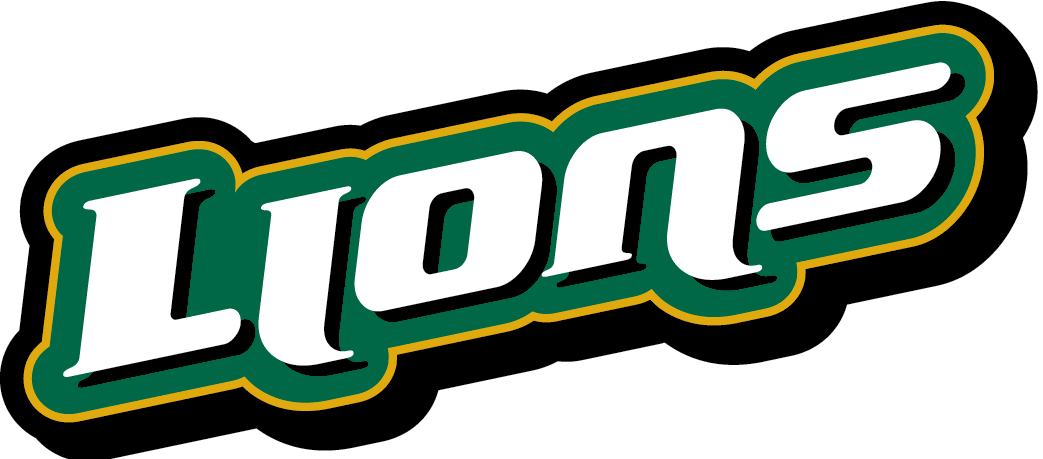
- Conference: Southland Conference
- Record: 3–8 (2–5 Southland)
- Head coach: Mike Lucas (1st season)
- Offensive coordinator: Tommy Condell (1st season)
- Home stadium: Strawberry Stadium

2007 Southland Conference football standings
	Conf.			Overall
Team	W		L	W		L
No. 11 McNeese State $^	7	–	0	11	–	1
Sam Houston State	5	–	2	7	–	4
Central Arkansas*	5	–	2	6	–	5
Nicholls State	3	–	4	6	–	5
Texas State	3	–	4	4	–	7
Northwestern State	3	–	4	4	–	7
Southeastern Louisiana	2	–	5	3	–	8
Stephen F. Austin	0	–	7	0	–	11
$ – Conference champion; ^ – FCS playoff participant; * – Ineligible for postseason play due to transition from NCAA Division II; Rankings from The Sports Network poll

The 2007 Southeastern Louisiana Lions football team represented Southeastern Louisiana University as a member of the Southland Conference during the 2007 NCAA Division I FCS football season. Led by first-year head coach Mike Lucas, the Lions compiled an overall record of 3–8 with a mark of 2–5 in conference play, placing in seventh in the Southland. Southeastern Louisiana played home games at Strawberry Stadium in Hammond, Louisiana.

== Schedule ==
Date	Time	Opponent	Site	TV	Result	Attendance	Source
August 30	7:00 pm	at New Mexico State*	Aggie Memorial Stadium; Las Cruces, NM	AV	L 14–35	12,682	
September 8	6:00 pm	at Kansas*	Memorial Stadium; Lawrence, KS	Local Channels	L 0–62	43,914	
September 15	6:00 pm	Kentucky Wesleyan*	Strawberry Stadium; Hammond, LA		W 79–7	5,395	
September 22	7:00 pm	at Tulane*	Louisiana Superdome; New Orleans, LA		L 27–35	17,611	
October 6	6:00 pm	Stephen F. Austin	Strawberry Stadium; Hammond, LA		W 21–3	3,460	
October 13	2:30 pm	at Northwestern State	Harry Turpin Stadium; Natchitoches, LA (rivalry)		L 24–27	8,029	
October 20	6:00 pm	Central Arkansas	Strawberry Stadium; Hammond, LA		L 33–37	4,373	
October 27	7:00 pm	at No. 5 McNeese State	Cowboy Stadium; Lake Charles, LA		L 17–45	15,153	
November 3	6:00 pm	at Texas State	Bobcat Stadium; San Marcos, TX		L 31–45	9,981	
November 10	6:00 pm	Sam Houston State	Strawberry Stadium; Hammond, LA		L 16–20	6,404	
November 17	2:30 pm	Nicholls State	Strawberry Stadium; Hammond, LA (River Bell Classic)		W 17–13	5,122	
*Non-conference game; Rankings from The Sports Network Poll released prior to the game; All times are in Central time
