= 2007 McNeese State Cowboys football team =

American college football season

2007 McNeese State Cowboys football

Southland champion

NCAA Division I First Round, L 15–44 vs. Eastern Washington
- Conference: Southland Conference

Ranking
- Sports Network: No. 11
- Record: 11–1 (7–0 Southland)
- Head coach: Matt Viator (2nd season)
- Co-offensive coordinators: Broderick Fobbs (1st season); Tim Leger (1st season)
- Home stadium: Cowboy Stadium

2007 Southland Conference football standings
	Conf.			Overall
Team	W		L	W		L
No. 11 McNeese State $^	7	–	0	11	–	1
Sam Houston State	5	–	2	7	–	4
Central Arkansas*	5	–	2	6	–	5
Nicholls State	3	–	4	6	–	5
Texas State	3	–	4	4	–	7
Northwestern State	3	–	4	4	–	7
Southeastern Louisiana	2	–	5	3	–	8
Stephen F. Austin	0	–	7	0	–	11
$ – Conference champion; ^ – FCS playoff participant; * – Ineligible for postseason play due to transition from NCAA Division II; Rankings from The Sports Network poll

The 2007 McNeese State Cowboys football team was an American football team that represented McNeese State University as a member of the Southland Conference (Southland) during the 2007 NCAA Division I FCS football season. In their second year under head coach Matt Viator, the team compiled an overall record of 11–1, with a mark of 7–0 in conference play, and finished as Southland champion. The Cowboys advanced to the NCAA Division I Football Championship playoffs and lost to Eastern Washington in the first round.

== Schedule ==
Date	Time	Opponent	Rank	Site	Result	Attendance	Source
September 1		No. 13 Portland State*	No. 10	Cowboy Stadium; Lake Charles, LA	W 35–12	13,498	
September 15	6:00 p.m.	at Louisiana–Lafayette*	No. 8	Cajun Field; Lafayette, LA (Cajun Crown)	W 38–17	33,828	
September 22		at Southern Utah*	No. 6	Eccles Coliseum; Cedar City, UT	W 41–20	3,987	
September 29		South Dakota*	No. 6	Cowboy Stadium; Lake Charles, LA	W 31–7	14,260	
October 6		at Texas State	No. 6	Bobcat Stadium; San Marcos, TX	W 41–20	13,171	
October 13		Sam Houston State	No. 6	Cowboy Stadium; Lake Charles, LA	W 31–21	13,060	
October 20	6:00 p.m.	at No. 13 Nicholls State	No. 6	John L. Guidry Stadium; Thibodaux, LA	W 28–7	6,486	
October 27	7:00 p.m.	Southeastern Louisiana	No. 5	Cowboy Stadium; Lake Charles, LA	W 45–17	15,153	
November 3	6:00 p.m.	at Stephen F. Austin	No. 5	Homer Bryce Stadium; Nacogdoches, TX	W 49–20	6,845	
November 10	7:00 p.m.	Northwestern State	No. 4	Cowboy Stadium; Lake Charles, LA (rivalry)	W 27–21	13,413	
November 17	7:00 p.m.	Central Arkansas	No. 4	Cowboy Stadium; Lake Charles, LA (rivalry)	W 41–14	11,135	
November 24		No. 14 Eastern Washington	No. 3	Cowboy Stadium; Lake Charles, LA (NCAA Division I First Round)	L 15–44	9,213	
*Non-conference game; Rankings from The Sports Network Poll released prior to the game; All times are in Central time
