= 2008 Sam Houston State Bearkats football team =

American college football season

2008 Sam Houston State Bearkats football
- Conference: Southland Conference
- Record: 4–6 (2–5 Southland)
- Head coach: Todd Whitten (4th season)
- Home stadium: Bowers Stadium

2008 Southland Conference football standings
| | Conf. | | | Overall |
| Team | W | | L | W | | L |
|---|---|---|---|---|---|---|
| No. 12 Central Arkansas* $ | 6 | – | 1 | 10 | – | 2 |
| No. 22 Texas State ^ | 5 | – | 2 | 8 | – | 5 |
| McNeese State | 4 | – | 3 | 7 | – | 3 |
| Northwestern State | 4 | – | 3 | 7 | – | 5 |
| Nicholls State | 3 | – | 4 | 3 | – | 6 |
| Southeastern Louisiana | 2 | – | 5 | 5 | – | 7 |
| Sam Houston State | 2 | – | 5 | 4 | – | 6 |
| Stephen F. Austin | 2 | – | 5 | 4 | – | 8 |
$ – Conference champion; ^ – FCS playoff participant; * – Ineligible for postseason play due to transition from NCAA Division II; Rankings from The Sports Network poll

The 2008 Sam Houston State Bearkats football team represented Sam Houston State University as a member of the Southland Conference during the 2008 NCAA Division I FCS football season. Led by fourth-year head coach Todd Whitten, the Bearkats compiled an overall record of 4–6 with a mark of 2–5 in conference play, and finished tied for sixth in the Southland.

== Schedule ==
| Date | Opponent | Site | Result | Attendance | Source |
|---|---|---|---|---|---|
| August 28 | East Central* | Bowers Stadium; Huntsville, TX | W 58–14 | 12,058 | |
| September 13 | at Prairie View A&M* | Bowers Stadium; Huntsville, TX | Canceled (Note: The game against Prairie View A&M scheduled for September 13 was canceled due to the impacts of Hurricane Ike.) | | |
| September 20 | at No. 19 (FBS) Kansas* | Memorial Stadium; Lawrence, KS | L 14–38 | 51,767 | |
| September 27 | at Gardner–Webb* | Ernest W. Spangler Stadium; Boiling Springs, NC | W 49–33 | 5,200 | |
| October 11 | at No. 14 Central Arkansas | Estes Stadium; Conway, AR | L 46–48 | 12,312 | |
| October 18 | No. 11 McNeese State | Bowers Stadium; Huntsville, TX | L 17–28 | 12,117 | |
| October 25 | at Northwestern State | Harry Turpin Stadium; Natchitoches, LA | L 16–24 | 8,922 | |
| November 1 | Stephen F. Austin | Bowers Stadium; Huntsville, TX (Battle of the Piney Woods) | W 34–31 ^{2OT} | 10,134 | |
| November 8 | at Nicholls State | John L. Guidry Stadium; Thibodaux, LA | W 47–37 | 4,032 | |
| November 15 | Southeastern Louisiana | Bowers Stadium; Huntsville, TX | L 27–30 ^{OT} | 7,027 | |
| November 22 | No. 23 Texas State | Bowers Stadium; Huntsville, TX (rivalry) | L 42–45 ^{OT} | 9,045 | |
*Non-conference game; Rankings from The Sports Network Poll released prior to the game
