= 2008 Central Arkansas Bears football team =

American college football season

2008 Central Arkansas Bears football

Southland champion
- Conference: Southland Conference

Ranking
- Sports Network: No. 12
- Record: 10–2 (6–1 Southland)
- Head coach: Clint Conque (9th season)
- Offensive coordinator: Brooks Hollingsworth (5th season)
- Home stadium: Estes Stadium

2008 Southland Conference football standings
	Conf.			Overall
Team	W		L	W		L
No. 12 Central Arkansas* $	6	–	1	10	–	2
No. 22 Texas State ^	5	–	2	8	–	5
McNeese State	4	–	3	7	–	3
Northwestern State	4	–	3	7	–	5
Nicholls State	3	–	4	3	–	6
Southeastern Louisiana	2	–	5	5	–	7
Sam Houston State	2	–	5	4	–	6
Stephen F. Austin	2	–	5	4	–	8
$ – Conference champion; ^ – FCS playoff participant; * – Ineligible for postseason play due to transition from NCAA Division II; Rankings from The Sports Network poll

The 2008 Central Arkansas Bears football team represented the University of Central Arkansas as a member of the Southland Conference during the 2008 NCAA Division I FCS football season. Led by ninth-year head coach Clint Conque, the Bears compiled an overall record of 10–2 with a mark of 6–1 in conference play, winning the Southland title. Despite winning the Southland Conference, the Bears were ineligible for the FCS playoffs due to their transition from NCAA Division II. Central Arkansas played home games at Estes Stadium in Conway, Arkansas.

== Schedule ==
Date	Time	Opponent	Rank	Site	Result	Attendance	Source
August 27	7:00 pm	Henderson State*	No. 22	Estes Stadium; Conway, AR	W 38–14	12,158	
September 6	6:00 pm	UC Davis*	No. 22	Estes Stadium; Conway, AR	W 24–21	10,188	
September 13	6:00 pm	vs. Arkansas–Pine Bluff*	No. 19	War Memorial Stadium; Little Rock, AR	W 41–17	4,823	
September 20	6:00 pm	Quincy*	No. 18	Estes Stadium; Conway, AR	W 51–6	10,873	
September 27	6:05 pm	at Tulsa*		Skelly Field at H. A. Chapman Stadium; Tulsa, OK	L 34–62	20,646	
October 11	6:05 pm	Sam Houston State	No. 14	Estes Stadium; Conway, AR	W 48–46	12,312	
October 18	3:00 pm	at Texas State	No. 13	Bobcat Stadium; San Marcos, TX	W 31–24	10,418	
October 25	6:00 pm	Southeastern Louisiana	No. 13	Estes Stadium; Conway, AR	W 28–21	9,113	
November 1	1:00 pm	at Nicholls State	No. 11	John L. Guidry Stadium; Thibodaux, LA	L 17–20	6,197	
November 8	4:00 pm	Northwestern State	No. 16	Estes Stadium; Conway, AR	W 42–6	9,767	
November 15	6:07 pm	at Stephen F. Austin	No. 15	Homer Bryce Stadium; Nacogdoches, TX	W 49–41	7,467	
November 22	4:00 pm	No. 14 McNeese State	No. 13	Estes Stadium; Conway, AR (Red Beans and Rice Bowl)	W 47–31	10,220	
*Non-conference game; Rankings from The Sports Network Poll released prior to the game; All times are in Central time
