= 2007 Alabama A&M Bulldogs football team =

American college football season

2007 Alabama A&M Bulldogs football
- Conference: Southwestern Athletic Conference
- Record: 8–3 (6–3 SWAC)
- Head coach: Anthony Jones (6th season)
- Offensive coordinator: Cedric Pearl (1st season)
- Home stadium: Louis Crews Stadium

2007 Southwestern Athletic Conference football standings
	Conf.			Overall
Team	W		L	W		L
East Division
Jackson State xy$	7	–	2	8	–	4
Alabama A&M	6	–	3	3	–	3
Alabama State	4	–	5	5	–	6
Mississippi Valley State	2	–	7	3	–	8
Alcorn State	2	–	7	2	–	8
West Division
No. 25 Grambling State xy	8	–	1	8	–	4
Southern	6	–	3	8	–	3
Prairie View A&M	6	–	3	7	–	3
Arkansas–Pine Bluff	4	–	5	4	–	7
Texas Southern	0	–	9	0	–	11
Championship: Jackson State 42, Grambling State 31
$ – Conference champion; x – Division champion/co-champions; y – Championship game participant; Rankings from The Sports Network Poll

The 2007 Alabama A&M Bulldogs football team represented Alabama A&M University as a member of the Southwestern Athletic Conference (SWAC) during the 2007 NCAA Division I FCS football season. Led by sixth-year head coach Anthony Jones, the Bulldogs compiled an overall record of 8–3 and a mark of 6–3 in conference play, and finished second in the SWAC East Division.

== Schedule ==
Date	Opponent	Rank	Site	Result	Attendance	Source
September 1	at Tennessee State*		LP Field; Nashville, TN (John Merritt Classic)	W 49–23	23,440	
September 8	Clark Atlanta*		Louis Crews Stadium; Normal, AL	W 41–10		
September 15	Mississippi Valley State		Louis Crews Stadium; Normal, AL	W 45–14		
September 22	at Grambling State	No. 23	Eddie G. Robinson Memorial Stadium; Grambling, LA	L 6–31	7,831	
September 29	Texas Southern		Louis Crews Stadium; Normal, AL	W 48–24		
October 6	at Southern		A. W. Mumford Stadium; Baton Rouge, LA	W 33–28		
October 18	Arkansas–Pine Bluff		Louis Crews Stadium; Normal, AL	W 31–14		
October 27	vs. Alabama State		Legion Field; Birmingham, AL (Magic City Classic)	W 13–9	68,593	
November 3	Jackson State		Louis Crews Stadium; Normal, AL	L 40–43 ^{OT}	7,527	
November 10	at Alcorn State		Jack Spinks Stadium; Lorman, MS	W 24–20		
November 17	at Prairie View A&M		Edward L. Blackshear Field; Prairie View, TX	L 20–30		
*Non-conference game; Rankings from The Sports Network Poll released prior to the game
