= 2007 Texas Southern Tigers football team =

American college football season

2007 Texas Southern Tigers football
- Conference: Southwestern Athletic Conference
- West Division
- Record: 0–11 (0–9 SWAC)
- Head coach: Steve Wilson (4th season; first 9 games); DeChon Burns (interim, final 2 games)
- Home stadium: Alexander Durley Sports Complex; Reliant Stadium

2007 Southwestern Athletic Conference football standings
	Conf.			Overall
Team	W		L	W		L
East Division
Jackson State xy$	7	–	2	8	–	4
Alabama A&M	6	–	3	3	–	3
Alabama State	4	–	5	5	–	6
Mississippi Valley State	2	–	7	3	–	8
Alcorn State	2	–	7	2	–	8
West Division
No. 25 Grambling State xy	8	–	1	8	–	4
Southern	6	–	3	8	–	3
Prairie View A&M	6	–	3	7	–	3
Arkansas–Pine Bluff	4	–	5	4	–	7
Texas Southern	0	–	9	0	–	11
Championship: Jackson State 42, Grambling State 31
$ – Conference champion; x – Division champion/co-champions; y – Championship game participant; Rankings from The Sports Network Poll

The 2007 Texas Southern Tigers football team represented Texas Southern University as a member of the Southwestern Athletic Conference (SWAC) during the 2007 NCAA Division I FCS football season. Led by fourth-year head coach Steve Wilson, the Tigers compiled an overall record of 0–11, with a mark of 0–9 in conference play, and finished fifth in the West Division of the SWAC.

Head coach Steve Wilson was fired after nine games and was replaced by defensive coordinator DeChon Burns for the team's last two games. Wilson's replacement, Johnnie Cole, was announced on November 30.

== Schedule ==
Date	Opponent	Site	Result	Attendance	Source
September 1	Prairie View A&M	Reliant Stadium; Houston, TX (Labor Day Classic)	L 14–34		
September 8	Alabama State	Alexander Durley Sports Complex; Houston, TX	L 10–21		
September 13	at Jackson State	Mississippi Veterans Memorial Stadium; Jackson, MS	L 7–28		
September 22	at UTEP*	Sun Bowl; El Paso, TX	L 12–52	35,336	
September 29	at Alabama A&M	Louis Crews Stadium; Normal, AL	L 24–48		
October 13	Alcorn State	Alexander Durley Sports Complex; Houston, TX	L 20–22		
October 20	at Mississippi Valley State	Rice–Totten Stadium; Itta Bena, MS	L 35–37		
October 27	at No. 21 Grambling State	Eddie G. Robinson Memorial Stadium; Grambling, LA	L 9–57	19,639	
November 3	Southern	Reliant Stadium; Houston, TX	L 7–56		
November 17	Arkansas–Pine Bluff	Alexander Durley Sports Complex; Houston, TX	L 10–20		
November 24	at Houston*	Robertson Stadium; Houston, TX	L 6–59	12,139	
*Non-conference game; Rankings from The Sports Network Poll released prior to the game
