= 2007 Gardner–Webb Runnin' Bulldogs football team =

American college football season

2007 Gardner–Webb Runnin' Bulldogs football
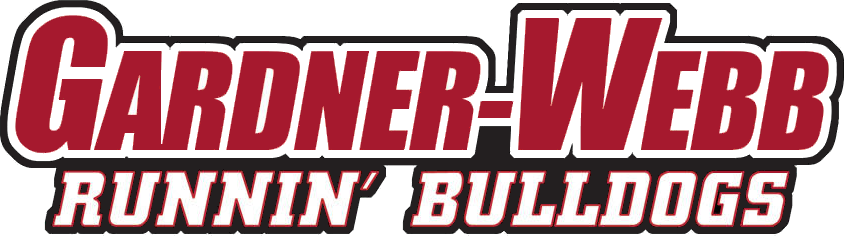
- Conference: Big South Conference
- Record: 5–6 (2–2 Big South)
- Head coach: Steve Patton (11th season)
- Defensive coordinator: John Windham (1st season)
- Home stadium: Ernest W. Spangler Stadium

2007 Big South Conference football standings
	Conf.			Overall
Team	W		L	W		L
Liberty $	4	–	0	8	–	3
Coastal Carolina	3	–	1	5	–	6
Gardner–Webb	2	–	2	5	–	6
Charleston Southern	1	–	3	5	–	6
VMI	0	–	4	2	–	9
$ – Conference champion

The 2007 Gardner–Webb Runnin' Bulldogs football team represented Gardner–Webb University as a member of the Big South Conference during the 2007 NCAA Division I FCS football season. Led by Steve Patton in his 11th-year as head coach, the Runnin' Bulldogs compiled an overall record of 5–6 with a mark of 2–2 in conference play, placing in third place in the Big South. Gardner–Webb played home games at Ernest W. Spangler Stadium in Boiling Springs, North Carolina.

== Schedule ==
Date	Time	Opponent	Site	TV	Result	Attendance	Source
September 1	7:00 pm	at Ohio*	Peden Stadium; Athens, OH	GTN	L 14–36	19,823	
September 8	6:00 pm	Jacksonville*	Ernest W. Spangler Stadium; Boiling Springs, NC		W 27–6	3,350	
September 22	7:00 pm	at Mississippi State*	Davis Wade Stadium; Starkville, MS		L 15–31	42,272	
September 29	6:00 pm	Austin Peay*	Ernest W. Spangler Stadium; Boiling Springs, NC		W 20–13	4,800	
October 6	2:30 pm	at No. 5 Appalachian State*	Kidd Brewer Stadium; Boone, NC		L 7–45	27,428	
October 13	3:00 pm	at No. 8 Wofford*	Gibbs Stadium; Spartanburg, SC		L 17–52	6,218	
October 20	1:00 pm	at VMI	Alumni Memorial Field; Lexington, VA		W 36–22	8,367	
October 27	6:30 pm	Charleston Southern	Ernest W. Spangler Stadium; Boiling Springs, NC		W 29–25	5,250	
November 3	1:30 pm	Savannah State*	Ernest W. Spangler Stadium; Boiling Springs, NC		W 66–0	13,906	
November 10	7:00 pm	at Coastal Carolina	Brooks Stadium; Conway, SC		L 14–17	7,129	
November 17	3:30 pm	Liberty	Ernest W. Spangler Stadium; Boiling Springs, NC		L 0–31	5,750	
*Non-conference game; Rankings from The Sports Network Poll released prior to the game; All times are in Eastern time
