= 2007 Norfolk State Spartans football team =

American college football season

2007 Norfolk State Spartans football
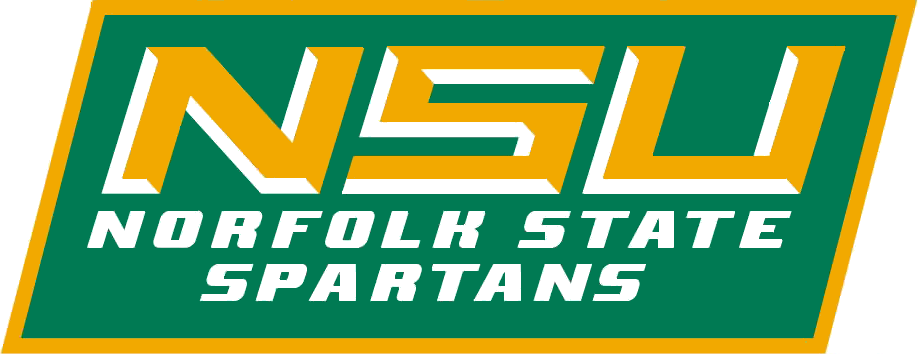
- Conference: Mid-Eastern Athletic Conference
- Record: 8–3 (6–2 MEAC)
- Head coach: Pete Adrian (3rd season)
- Home stadium: William "Dick" Price Stadium

2007 Mid-Eastern Athletic Conference football standings
	Conf.			Overall
Team	W		L	W		L
No. 15 Delaware State $^	9	–	0	10	–	2
Norfolk State	7	–	2	8	–	3
South Carolina State	7	–	2	7	–	4
Hampton	5	–	4	6	–	5
Winston-Salem State	5	–	4	6	–	5
Morgan State	4	–	5	5	–	6
Bethune–Cookman	3	–	6	5	–	6
Howard	3	–	6	4	–	7
Florida A&M	2	–	7	3	–	8
North Carolina A&T	0	–	9	0	–	11
$ – Conference champion; ^ – FCS playoff participant; Rankings from The Sports Network poll

The 2007 Norfolk State Spartans football team represented Norfolk State University in the 2007 NCAA Division I FCS football season. The Spartans were led by third-year head coach Pete Adrian and played their home games at William "Dick" Price Stadium. They were a member of the Mid-Eastern Athletic Conference. They finished the season 8–3, 6–2 in MEAC play.

== Schedule ==
Date	Time	Opponent	Site	TV	Result	Attendance	Source
September 1	6:00 pm	Virginia State*	William "Dick" Price Stadium; Norfolk, VA		W 33–7	26,970	
September 15	3:30 pm	at No. 13 (FBS) Rutgers*	Rutgers Stadium; Piscataway, NJ	ESPN Plus	L 0–59	43,712	
September 22	4:00 pm	Bethune–Cookman	William "Dick" Price Stadium; Norfolk, VA		W 38–31	12,736	
September 27	7:30 pm	at North Carolina A&T	Aggie Stadium; Greensboro, NC		W 50–20	9,409	
October 6	2:00 pm	South Carolina State	William "Dick" Price Stadium; Norfolk, VA		W 20–13 ^{2OT}	12,217	
October 13	2:00 pm	No. 18 Hampton	William "Dick" Price Stadium; Norfolk, VA (rivalry)		W 20–19	27,756	
October 18	7:00 pm	at Florida A&M	Bragg Memorial Stadium; Tallahassee, FL		W 33–27	12,287	
October 27	1:00 pm	Howard^{†}	William "Dick" Price Stadium; Norfolk, VA		L 10–17	15,548	
November 3	4:00 pm	at Morgan State	Hughes Stadium; Baltimore, MD		W 24–16	5,736	
November 10	12:00 pm	at No. 10 Delaware State	Alumni Stadium; Dover, DE		L 21–28 ^{OT}	6,682	
November 17	1:00 pm	Winston-Salem State	William "Dick" Price Stadium; Norfolk, VA		W 23–20	8,093	
*Non-conference game; ^{†}Homecoming; Rankings from The Sports Network Poll released prior to the game; All times are in Eastern time
