= 2007 Morgan State Bears football team =

American college football season

2007 Morgan State Bears football
- Conference: Mid-Eastern Athletic Conference
- Record: 5–6 (4–5 MEAC)
- Head coach: Donald Hill-Eley (6th season)
- Home stadium: Hughes Stadium

2007 Mid-Eastern Athletic Conference football standings
| | Conf. | | | Overall |
| Team | W | | L | W | | L |
|---|---|---|---|---|---|---|
| No. 15 Delaware State $^ | 9 | – | 0 | 10 | – | 2 |
| Norfolk State | 7 | – | 2 | 8 | – | 3 |
| South Carolina State | 7 | – | 2 | 7 | – | 4 |
| Hampton | 5 | – | 4 | 6 | – | 5 |
| Winston-Salem State | 5 | – | 4 | 6 | – | 5 |
| Morgan State | 4 | – | 5 | 5 | – | 6 |
| Bethune–Cookman | 3 | – | 6 | 5 | – | 6 |
| Howard | 3 | – | 6 | 4 | – | 7 |
| Florida A&M | 2 | – | 7 | 3 | – | 8 |
| North Carolina A&T | 0 | – | 9 | 0 | – | 11 |
$ – Conference champion; ^ – FCS playoff participant; Rankings from The Sports Network poll

The 2007 Morgan State Bears football team represented Morgan State University as a member of the Mid-Eastern Athletic Conference (MEAC) during the 2007 NCAA Division I FCS football season. Led by sixth-year head coach Donald Hill-Eley, the Bears compiled an overall record of 5–6, with a mark of 4–5 in conference play, and finished sixth in the MEAC.

== Schedule ==
| Date | Opponent | Site | Result | Attendance | Source |
|---|---|---|---|---|---|
| August 30 | Savannah State* | Hughes Stadium; Baltimore, MD | W 47–7 | 952 | |
| September 8 | Towson* | Hughes Stadium; Baltimore, MD (rivalry) | L 21–28 | 8,732 | |
| September 15 | Winston-Salem State | Hughes Stadium; Baltimore, MD | L 17–19 | | |
| September 20 | at No. 12 Hampton | Armstrong Stadium; Hampton, VA | L 17–24 ^{OT} | | |
| September 29 | at Bethune–Cookman | Municipal Stadium; Daytona Beach, FL | W 33–9 | 10,121 | |
| October 6 | North Carolina A&T | Hughes Stadium; Baltimore, MD | W 22–17 | 8,923 | |
| October 13 | Howard | Hughes Stadium; Baltimore, MD (rivalry) | W 36–33 ^{OT} | 14,987 | |
| October 20 | at No. 15 Delaware State | Alumni Stadium; Dover, DE | L 17–25 | 5,446 | |
| October 27 | Florida A&M | Hughes Stadium; Baltimore, MD | W 14–12 | 3,478 | |
| November 3 | Norfolk State | Hughes Stadium; Baltimore, MD | L 16–24 | 5,736 | |
| November 10 | at South Carolina State | Oliver C. Dawson Stadium; Orangeburg, SC | L 21–28 ^{OT} | | |
*Non-conference game; Rankings from The Sports Network Poll released prior to the game
