= 2007 Florida A&M Rattlers football team =

American college football season

2007 Florida A&M Rattlers football
- Conference: Mid-Eastern Athletic Conference
- Record: 3–8 (2–7 MEAC)
- Head coach: Rubin Carter (3rd season)
- Home stadium: Bragg Memorial Stadium

2007 Mid-Eastern Athletic Conference football standings
	Conf.			Overall
Team	W		L	W		L
No. 15 Delaware State $^	9	–	0	10	–	2
Norfolk State	7	–	2	8	–	3
South Carolina State	7	–	2	7	–	4
Hampton	5	–	4	6	–	5
Winston-Salem State	5	–	4	6	–	5
Morgan State	4	–	5	5	–	6
Bethune–Cookman	3	–	6	5	–	6
Howard	3	–	6	4	–	7
Florida A&M	2	–	7	3	–	8
North Carolina A&T	0	–	9	0	–	11
$ – Conference champion; ^ – FCS playoff participant; Rankings from The Sports Network poll

The 2007 Florida A&M Rattlers football team represented Florida A&M University as a member of the Mid-Eastern Athletic Conference (MEAC) during the 2007 NCAA Division I FCS football season. Led by third-year head coach Rubin Carter, the Rattlers compiled an overall record of 3–8, with a mark of 2–7 in conference play, and finished ninth in the MEAC.

== Schedule ==
Date	Opponent	Site	Result	Attendance	Source
September 1	vs. Southern*	Legion Field; Birmingham, AL (MEAC/SWAC Challenge)	L 27–33	30,106	
September 8	Delaware State	Bragg Memorial Stadium; Tallahassee, FL	L 7–20	14,327	
September 15	Howard	Bragg Memorial Stadium; Tallahassee, FL	W 30–17	10,175	
September 29	vs. Tennessee State*	Georgia Dome; Atlanta, GA (Atlanta Football Classic)	W 18–17	56,990	
October 6	vs. Winston-Salem State	RCA Dome; Indianapolis, IN (Circle City Classic)	L 23–27	35,000	
October 13	at South Carolina State	Oliver C. Dawson Stadium; Orangeburg, SC	L 14–49	21,500	
October 18	Norfolk State	Bragg Memorial Stadium; Tallahassee, FL	L 27–33	12,287	
October 27	at Morgan State	Hughes Stadium; Baltimore, MD	L 12–14	3,478	
November 3	North Carolina A&T^{†}	Bragg Memorial Stadium; Tallahassee, FL	W 24–21	23,984	
November 10	at Hampton	Armstrong Stadium; Hampton, VA	L 15–30	3,782	
November 17	vs. Bethune–Cookman	Florida Citrus Bowl; Orlando, FL (Florida Classic)	L 7–34	65,367	
*Non-conference game; ^{†}Homecoming
