= 2007 Coastal Carolina Chanticleers football team =

American college football season

2007 Coastal Carolina Chanticleers football
- Conference: Big South Conference
- Record: 5–6 (3–1 Big South)
- Head coach: David Bennett (5th season)
- Offensive coordinator: Jamie Snider (5th season)
- Offensive scheme: Multiple
- Defensive coordinator: Curtis Walker (5th season)
- Base defense: 4–3
- Home stadium: Brooks Stadium

2007 Big South Conference football standings
	Conf.			Overall
Team	W		L	W		L
Liberty $	4	–	0	8	–	3
Coastal Carolina	3	–	1	5	–	6
Gardner–Webb	2	–	2	5	–	6
Charleston Southern	1	–	3	5	–	6
VMI	0	–	4	2	–	9
$ – Conference champion

The 2007 Coastal Carolina Chanticleers football team represented Coastal Carolina University as a member of the Big South Conference during the 2007 NCAA Division I FCS football season. Led by fifth-year head coach David Bennett, the Chanticleers compiled an overall record of 5–6 with a mark of 3–1 in conference play, placing second in the Big South. Coastal Carolina played home games at Brooks Stadium in Conway, South Carolina.

== Schedule ==
Date	Time	Opponent	Site	Result	Attendance	Source
September 1	7:00 p.m.	at Delaware State*	Alumni Stadium; Dover, DE	L 18–23	3,248	
September 8	7:00 p.m.	Winston-Salem State*	Brooks Stadium; Conway, SC	W 28–21	8,138	
September 15	7:00 p.m.	Georgia Southern*	Brooks Stadium; Conway, SC	L 34–42	8,448	
September 22	6:00 p.m.	at James Madison*	Bridgeforth Stadium; Harrisonburg, VA	L 10–45	15,260	
October 6	2:00 p.m.	at Furman*	Paladin Stadium; Greenville, SC	L 17–27	11,251	
October 13	7:00 p.m.	Chowan*	Brooks Stadium; Conway, SC	W 51–0	7,841	
October 20	7:00 p.m.	Presbyterian*	Brooks Stadium; Conway, SC	L 34–41 ^{OT}	6,492	
October 27	7:00 p.m.	VMI	Brooks Stadium; Conway, SC	W 42–35	7,048	
November 3	3:30 p.m.	at Liberty	Williams Stadium; Lynchburg, VA (rivalry)	L 24–37	14,411	
November 10	7:00 p.m.	Gardner–Webb	Brooks Stadium; Conway, SC	W 17–14	7,129	
November 17	12:00 p.m.	at Charleston Southern	Buccaneer Field; North Charleston, SC	W 41–2	3,965	
*Non-conference game; All times are in Eastern time
