= 2007 Hampton Pirates football team =

American college football season

2007 Hampton Pirates football
- Conference: Mid-Eastern Athletic Conference
- Record: 6–5 (5–4 MEAC)
- Head coach: Joe Taylor (16th season)
- Home stadium: Armstrong Stadium

2007 Mid-Eastern Athletic Conference football standings
	Conf.			Overall
Team	W		L	W		L
No. 15 Delaware State $^	9	–	0	10	–	2
Norfolk State	7	–	2	8	–	3
South Carolina State	7	–	2	7	–	4
Hampton	5	–	4	6	–	5
Winston-Salem State	5	–	4	6	–	5
Morgan State	4	–	5	5	–	6
Bethune–Cookman	3	–	6	5	–	6
Howard	3	–	6	4	–	7
Florida A&M	2	–	7	3	–	8
North Carolina A&T	0	–	9	0	–	11
$ – Conference champion; ^ – FCS playoff participant; Rankings from The Sports Network poll

The 2007 Hampton Pirates football team represented Hampton University as a member of the Mid-Eastern Athletic Conference (MEAC) during the 2007 NCAA Division I FCS football season. Led by 16th-year head coach Joe Taylor, the Pirates compiled an overall record of 6–5, with a mark of 5–4 in conference play, and finished tied for fourth in the MEAC.

== Schedule ==
Date	Opponent	Rank	Site	Result	Attendance	Source
September 8	at Howard	No. 15	William H. Greene Stadium; Washington, DC (rivalry)	W 31–24		
September 15	at North Carolina A&T	No. 13	Aggie Stadium; Greensboro, NC	W 59–14	12,547	
September 20	Morgan State	No. 12	Armstrong Stadium; Hampton, VA	W 24–17 ^{OT}		
September 29	Delaware State	No. 13	Armstrong Stadium; Hampton, VA	L 17–24	7,195	
October 6	at Princeton*	No. 21	Princeton Stadium; Princeton, NJ	W 48–27	15,329	
October 13	at Norfolk State	No. 18	William "Dick" Price Stadium; Norfolk, VA (rivalry)	L 19–20	27,756	
October 20	South Carolina State		Armstrong Stadium; Hampton, VA	L 24–28	14,625	
October 27	at Winston-Salem State		Bowman Gray Stadium; Winston-Salem, NC	L 19–20		
November 3	at Bethune–Cookman		Municipal Stadium; Daytona Beach, FL	W 31–24	3,475	
November 10	Florida A&M		Armstrong Stadium; Hampton, VA	W 30–15	3,782	
November 17	No. 5 Southern Illinois*		Armstrong Stadium; Hampton, VA	L 27–45	3,340	
*Non-conference game; Rankings from The Sports Network Poll released prior to the game
