= 2007 Winston-Salem State Rams football team =

American college football season

2007 Winston-Salem State Rams football
- Conference: Mid-Eastern Athletic Conference
- Record: 6–5 (5–4 MEAC)
- Head coach: Kermit Blount (15th season)
- Home stadium: Bowman Gray Stadium

2007 Mid-Eastern Athletic Conference football standings
	Conf.			Overall
Team	W		L	W		L
No. 15 Delaware State $^	9	–	0	10	–	2
Norfolk State	7	–	2	8	–	3
South Carolina State	7	–	2	7	–	4
Hampton	5	–	4	6	–	5
Winston-Salem State	5	–	4	6	–	5
Morgan State	4	–	5	5	–	6
Bethune–Cookman	3	–	6	5	–	6
Howard	3	–	6	4	–	7
Florida A&M	2	–	7	3	–	8
North Carolina A&T	0	–	9	0	–	11
$ – Conference champion; ^ – FCS playoff participant; Rankings from The Sports Network poll

The 2007 Winston-Salem State Rams football team represented Winston-Salem State University as a member of the Mid-Eastern Athletic Conference (MEAC) during the 2007 NCAA Division I FCS football season. Led by 15th-year head coach Kermit Blount, the Rams compiled an overall record of 6–5, with a mark of 5–4 in conference play, and finished tied for fourth in the MEAC.

== Schedule ==
Date	Opponent	Site	Result	Attendance	Source
September 1	North Carolina A&T	Bowman Gray Stadium; Winston-Salem, NC (rivalry)	W 28–7	22,000	
September 8	at Coastal Carolina*	Brooks Stadium; Conway, SC	L 21–28	8,138	
September 15	at Morgan State	Hughes Stadium; Baltimore, MD	W 19–17		
September 22	at South Carolina State	Oliver C. Dawson Stadium; Orangeburg, SC	L 7–20	8,222	
September 29	at Howard	William H. Greene Stadium; Washington, DC	L 21–24 ^{OT}	3,302	
October 6	vs. Florida A&M	RCA Dome; Indianapolis, IN (Circle City Classic)	W 27–23	35,000	
October 20	at Bethune–Cookman	Municipal Stadium; Daytona Beach, FL	W 14–9	3,281	
October 27	Hampton	Bowman Gray Stadium; Winston-Salem, NC	W 20–19		
November 3	No. 12 Delaware State	Bowman Gray Stadium; Winston-Salem, NC	L 20–23	15,432	
November 10	North Carolina Central*	Bowman Gray Stadium; Winston-Salem, NC	W 35–10	9,500	
November 17	at Norfolk State	William "Dick" Price Stadium; Norfolk, VA	L 20–23	8,093	
*Non-conference game; Rankings from The Sports Network Poll released prior to the game
