= 2007 Bethune–Cookman Wildcats football team =

American college football season

2007 Bethune–Cookman Wildcats football
- Conference: Mid-Eastern Athletic Conference
- Record: 5–6 (3–6 MEAC)
- Head coach: Alvin Wyatt (11th season)
- Home stadium: Municipal Stadium

2007 Mid-Eastern Athletic Conference football standings
	Conf.			Overall
Team	W		L	W		L
No. 15 Delaware State $^	9	–	0	10	–	2
Norfolk State	7	–	2	8	–	3
South Carolina State	7	–	2	7	–	4
Hampton	5	–	4	6	–	5
Winston-Salem State	5	–	4	6	–	5
Morgan State	4	–	5	5	–	6
Bethune–Cookman	3	–	6	5	–	6
Howard	3	–	6	4	–	7
Florida A&M	2	–	7	3	–	8
North Carolina A&T	0	–	9	0	–	11
$ – Conference champion; ^ – FCS playoff participant; Rankings from The Sports Network poll

The 2007 Bethune–Cookman Wildcats football team represented Bethune–Cookman University as a member of the Mid-Eastern Athletic Conference (MEAC) during the 2007 NCAA Division I FCS football season. Led by 11th-year head coach Alvin Wyatt, the Wildcats compiled an overall record of 5–6, with a mark of 3–6 in conference play, and finished tied for seventh in the MEAC.

== Schedule ==
Date	Opponent	Site	Result	Attendance	Source
September 1	Jacksonville*	Municipal Stadium; Daytona Beach, FL	W 31–17	7,845	
September 8	South Carolina State	Municipal Stadium; Daytona Beach, FL	L 13–24	9,147	
September 15	at Savannah State*	Memorial Stadium; Savannah, GA	W 45–13	5,063	
September 22	at Norfolk State	William "Dick" Price Stadium; Norfolk, VA	L 31–38	12,736	
September 29	Morgan State	Municipal Stadium; Daytona Beach, FL	L 9–33	10,121	
October 4	at Delaware State	Alumni Stadium; Dover, DE	L 10–24	3,239	
October 20	Winston-Salem State	Municipal Stadium; Daytona Beach, FL	L 9–14	3,281	
October 27	at North Carolina A&T	Aggie Stadium; Greensboro, NC	W 24–20	20,013	
November 3	Hampton	Municipal Stadium; Daytona Beach, FL	L 24–31	3,475	
November 10	at Howard	William H. Greene Stadium; Washington, DC	W 37–26		
November 17	vs. Florida A&M	Florida Citrus Bowl; Orlando, FL (Florida Classic)	W 34–7	65,367	
*Non-conference game
