= 2007 Presbyterian Blue Hose football team =

American college football season

2007 Presbyterian Blue Hose football
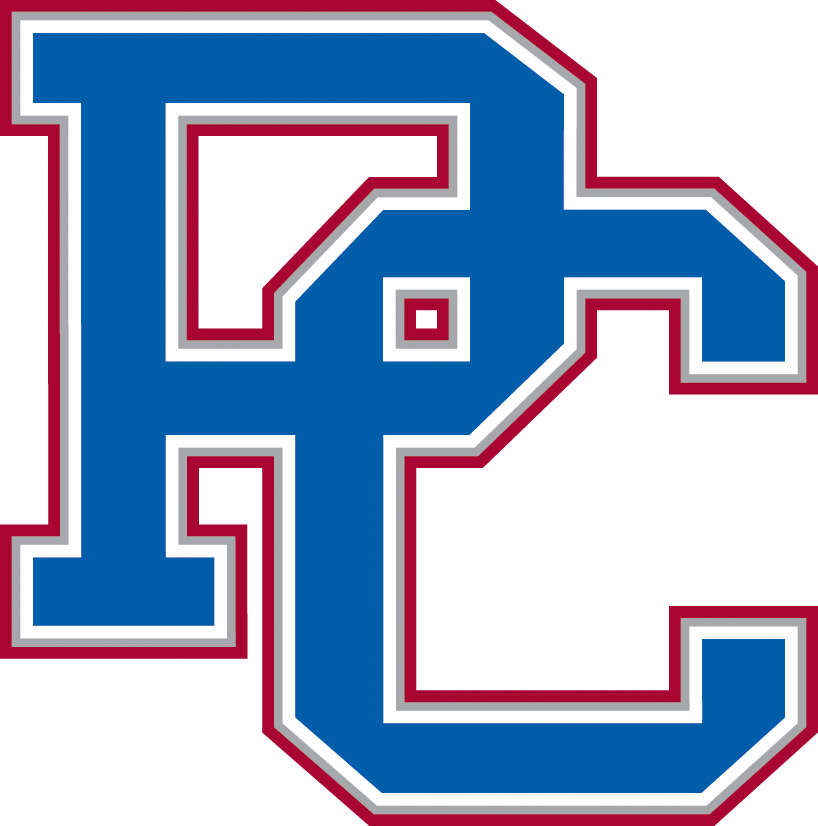
- Conference: Independent
- Record: 6–5
- Head coach: Bobby Bentley (1st season)
- Home stadium: Bailey Memorial Stadium

2007 NCAA Division I FCS independents football standings
	Conf.			Overall
Team	W		L	W		L
Western Kentucky		–		7	–	5
Stony Brook		–		6	–	5
Presbyterian		–		6	–	5
Savannah State		–		1	–	9

The 2007 Presbyterian Blue Hose football team represented Presbyterian College in the 2007 NCAA Division I FCS football season as an independent. They were led by first-year head coach Bobby Bentley and played their home games at Bailey Memorial Stadium.

== Schedule ==
Date	Time	Opponent	Site	Result	Attendance	Source
September 1	7:00 p.m.	at No. 11 Furman	Paladin Stadium; Greenville, SC	L 16–40	11,188	
September 8	1:30 p.m.	Pikeville	Bailey Memorial Stadium; Clinton, SC	W 58–7		
September 13	8:00 p.m.	at Samford	Seibert Stadium; Homewood, AL	L 24–34	2,575	
September 22	6:00 p.m.	at Western Carolina	Bob Waters Field at E. J. Whitmire Stadium; Cullowhee, NC	L 20–33	8,365	
September 29	2:00 p.m.	at North Carolina Central	O'Kelly–Riddick Stadium; Durham, NC	W 34–27		
October 6	2:00 p.m.	North Greenville	Bailey Memorial Stadium; Clinton, SC	W 66–52		
October 13	1:00 p.m.	at VMI	Alumni Memorial Field; Lexington, VA	W 45–21	6,433	
October 20	7:00 p.m.	at Coastal Carolina	Brooks Stadium; Conway, SC	W 41–34 ^{OT}	6,492	
October 27	1:00 p.m.	at Liberty	Williams Stadium; Lynchburg, VA	L 14–48	15,307	
November 3	1:30 p.m.	Chowan	Bailey Memorial Stadium; Clinton, SC	W 62–10		
November 10	1:30 p.m.	at Charleston Southern	Buccaneer Field; North Charleston, SC	L 24–28	3,542	
Rankings from The Sports Network Poll released prior to the game; All times are in Eastern time
