= 2007 Grambling State Tigers football team =

American college football season

2007 Grambling State Tigers football

SWAC West Division champion

SWAC Championship Game, L 31–42 vs. Jackson State
- Conference: Southwestern Athletic Conference
- West Division

Ranking
- Sports Network: No. 25
- Record: 8–4 (8–1 SWAC)
- Head coach: Rod Broadway (1st season)
- Offensive scheme: Spread option
- Defensive coordinator: Cliff Yoshida (1st season)
- Base defense: 3–4
- Home stadium: Eddie G. Robinson Memorial Stadium

2007 Southwestern Athletic Conference football standings
	Conf.			Overall
Team	W		L	W		L
East Division
Jackson State xy$	7	–	2	8	–	4
Alabama A&M	6	–	3	3	–	3
Alabama State	4	–	5	5	–	6
Mississippi Valley State	2	–	7	3	–	8
Alcorn State	2	–	7	2	–	8
West Division
No. 25 Grambling State xy	8	–	1	8	–	4
Southern	6	–	3	8	–	3
Prairie View A&M	6	–	3	7	–	3
Arkansas–Pine Bluff	4	–	5	4	–	7
Texas Southern	0	–	9	0	–	11
Championship: Jackson State 42, Grambling State 31
$ – Conference champion; x – Division champion/co-champions; y – Championship game participant; Rankings from The Sports Network Poll

The 2007 Grambling State Tigers football team represented Grambling State University as a member of the Southwestern Athletic Conference (SWAC) during the 2007 NCAA Division I FCS football season. Led by first-year head coach Rod Broadway, the Tigers compiled an overall record of 8–4 and a mark of 8–1 in conference play, and finished first in the SWAC West Division.

== Schedule ==
Date	Opponent	Rank	Site	Result	Attendance	Source
September 1	at Alcorn State		Jack Spinks Stadium; Lorman, MS	W 31–10	16,960	
September 8	at Pittsburgh*		Heinz Field; Pittsburgh, PA	L 10–34	30,852	
September 22	No. 23 Alabama A&M		Eddie G. Robinson Memorial Stadium; Grambling, LA	W 31–6	7,831	
September 29	vs. Prairie View A&M		Cotton Bowl; Dallas, TX (rivalry)	W 17–14	55,878	
October 6	Mississippi Valley State		Eddie G. Robinson Memorial Stadium; Grambling, LA	W 40–0	9,873	
October 13	vs. Arkansas–Pine Bluff	No. 25	War Memorial Stadium; Little Rock, AR (Delta Classic)	W 30–24	40,067	
October 20	at Jackson State	No. 23	Mississippi Veterans Memorial Stadium; Jackson, MS	W 30–20	14,501	
October 27	Texas Southern	No. 21	Eddie G. Robinson Memorial Stadium; Grambling, LA	W 57–9	19,639	
November 3	at Alabama State	No. 18	Cramton Bowl; Montgomery, AL	W 21–7	9,579	
November 10	at Louisiana–Monroe*	No. 17	Malone Stadium; Monroe, LA	L 14–28	30,101	
November 24	vs. Southern	No. 16	Louisiana Superdome; New Orleans, LA (Bayou Classic)	L 13–22	53,297	
December 15	vs. Jackson State	No. 25	Legion Field; Birmingham, AL (SWAC Championship Game)	L 31–42	43,206	
*Non-conference game; Rankings from The Sports Network Poll released prior to the game
