= 2007 Liberty Flames football team =

American college football season

2007 Liberty Flames football
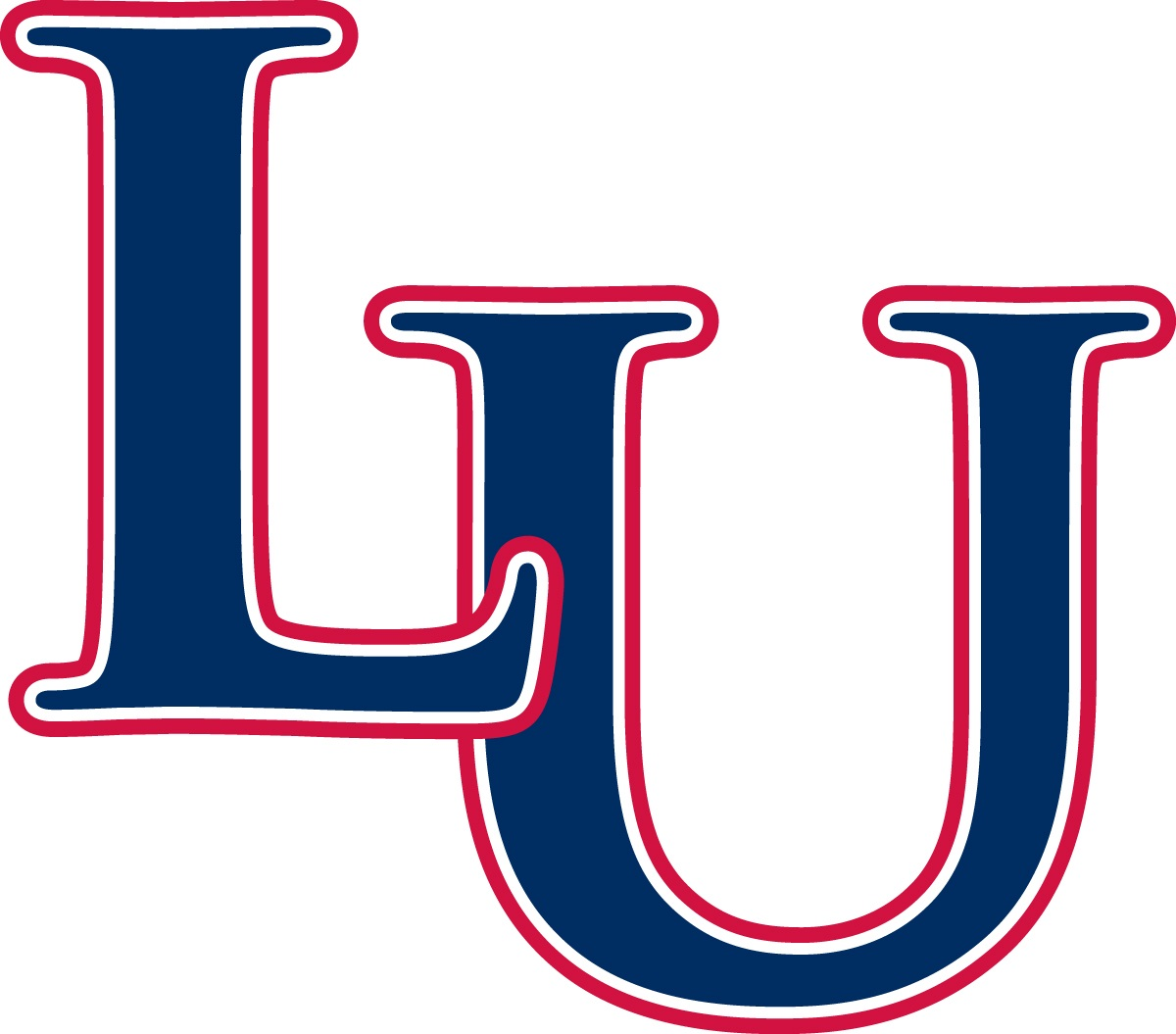

Big South champion
- Conference: Big South Conference
- Record: 8–3 (4–0 Big South)
- Head coach: Danny Rocco (2nd season)
- Offensive coordinator: Scott Wachenheim (2nd season)
- Defensive coordinator: Tom Clark (2nd season)
- Base defense: 3–4
- Home stadium: Williams Stadium

2007 Big South Conference football standings
	Conf.			Overall
Team	W		L	W		L
Liberty $	4	–	0	8	–	3
Coastal Carolina	3	–	1	5	–	6
Gardner–Webb	2	–	2	5	–	6
Charleston Southern	1	–	3	5	–	6
VMI	0	–	4	2	–	9
$ – Conference champion

The 2007 Liberty Flames football team represented Liberty University a member of the Big South Conference during the 2007 NCAA Division I FCS football season. Led by second-year head coach Danny Rocco, the Flames compiled an overall record of 10–3 with a mark of 5–0 in conference play, winning the Big South title. Liberty played home games at Williams Stadium in Lynchburg, Virginia.

== Schedule ==
Date	Time	Opponent	Site	Result	Attendance	Source
September 1	7:00 pm	Tusculum*	Williams Stadium; Lynchburg, VA	W 38–14	14,925	
September 8	7:00 pm	Shippensburg*	Williams Stadium; Lynchburg, VA	W 35–14	12,331	
September 15	7:00 pm	at William & Mary*	Zable Stadium; Williamsburg, VA	L 41–48 ^{2OT}	9,329	
September 22	1:30 pm	at Elon*	Rhodes Stadium; Elon, NC	L 14–42	6,796	
September 29	7:00 pm	Saint Francis*	Williams Stadium; Lynchburg, VA	W 68–10	13,893	
October 6	7:00 pm	at Toledo*	Glass Bowl; Toledo, OH	L 34–35	16,071	
October 20	1:30 pm	at Charleston Southern	Buccaneer Field; North Charleston, SC	W 50–10	3,461	
October 27	1:00 pm	Presbyterian*	Williams Stadium; Lynchburg, VA	W 48–14	15,307	
November 3	3:30 pm	Coastal Carolina	Williams Stadium; Lynchburg, VA (rivalry)	W 37–24	14,411	
November 7	1:00 pm	VMI	Williams Stadium; Lynchburg, VA	W 73–34	14,273	
November 17	3:30 pm	at Gardner–Webb	Ernest W. Spangler Stadium; Boiling Springs, NC	W 31–0	5,750	
*Non-conference game; All times are in Eastern time
