= 2007 Mississippi Valley State Delta Devils football team =

American college football season

2007 Mississippi Valley State Delta Devils football
- Conference: Southwestern Athletic Conference
- East Division
- Record: 3–8 (2–6 SWAC)
- Head coach: Willie Totten (6th season)
- Home stadium: Rice–Totten Stadium

2007 Southwestern Athletic Conference football standings
	Conf.			Overall
Team	W		L	W		L
East Division
Jackson State xy$	7	–	2	8	–	4
Alabama A&M	6	–	3	3	–	3
Alabama State	4	–	5	5	–	6
Mississippi Valley State	2	–	7	3	–	8
Alcorn State	2	–	7	2	–	8
West Division
No. 25 Grambling State xy	8	–	1	8	–	4
Southern	6	–	3	8	–	3
Prairie View A&M	6	–	3	7	–	3
Arkansas–Pine Bluff	4	–	5	4	–	7
Texas Southern	0	–	9	0	–	11
Championship: Jackson State 42, Grambling State 31
$ – Conference champion; x – Division champion/co-champions; y – Championship game participant; Rankings from The Sports Network Poll

The 2007 Mississippi Valley State Delta Devils football team represented Mississippi Valley State University as a member of the Southwestern Athletic Conference (SWAC) during the 2007 NCAA Division I FCS football season. Led by sixth-year head coach Willie Totten, the Delta Devils compiled an overall record of 3–8 and a mark of 2–6 in conference play, and finished tied for fourth in the SWAC East Division.

== Schedule ==
Date	Opponent	Site	Result	Attendance	Source
September 1	Arkansas–Pine Bluff	Rice–Totten Stadium; Itta Bena, MS	W 16–9		
September 8	vs. Southern	Soldier Field; Chicago, IL (Chicago Football Classic)	L 6–23	49,872	
September 15	at Alabama A&M	Louis Crews Stadium; Normal, AL	L 14–45		
September 22	Jackson State	Rice–Totten Stadium; Itta Bena, MS	L 16–50	11,700	
October 6	at Grambling State	Eddie G. Robinson Memorial Stadium; Grambling, LA	L 0–40	9,873	
October 13	North Dakota State*	Rice–Totten Stadium; Itta Bena, MS	L 7–58	4,986	
October 20	Texas Southern	Rice–Totten Stadium; Itta Bena, MS	W 37–35		
October 27	at Prairie View A&M	Edward L. Blackshear Field; Prairie View, TX	L 21–26		
November 3	at Alcorn State	Jack Spinks Stadium; Lorman, MS	L 14–17		
November 10	Alabama State	Rice–Totten Stadium; Itta Bena, MS	L 16–20		
November 17	at Savannah State*	Ted Wright Stadium; Savannah, GA	W 28–3		
*Non-conference game
