= Carey Bailey =

American gridiron football player and coach (born 1969)

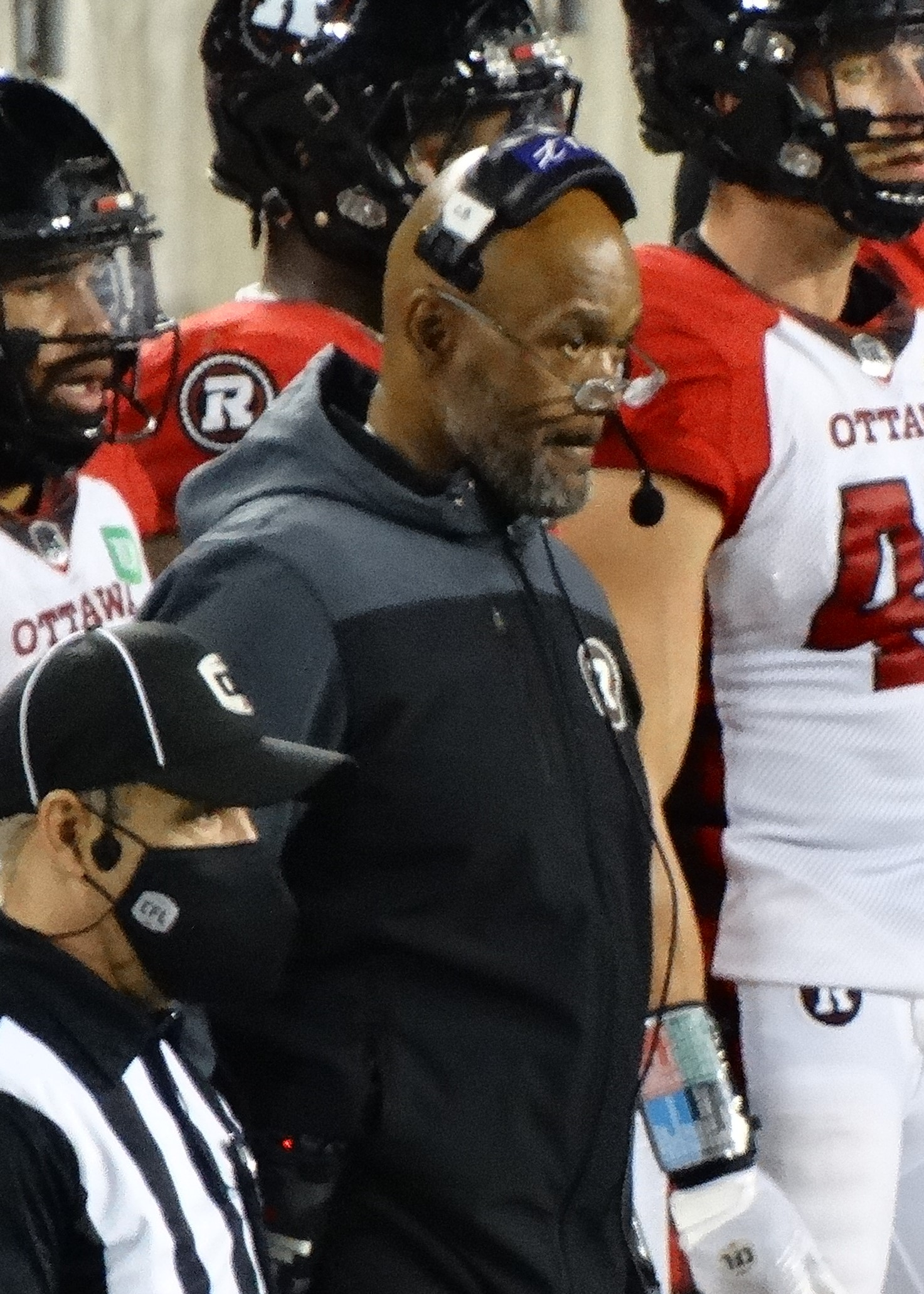
- Bailey with the Redblacks in 2021

Biographical details
- Born: January 16, 1969 (age 57); Bluefield, West Virginia, U.S.

Playing career
- 1988–1991: Tennessee
- Position: Defensive tackle

Coaching career (HC unless noted)
- 1993–1994: West Virginia (GA)
- 1995–1997: VMI (DE)
- 1998: Louisiana–Lafayette (LB)
- 1999–2002: Louisiana–Lafayette (DT)
- 2003: Middle Tennessee (DL)
- 2004: Oklahoma State (DL)
- 2005–2006: Minnesota (DL)
- 2007–2010: Howard
- 2012–2013: Lamar (DL)
- 2012: Atlanta Falcons (LB intern)
- 2014–2016: Lamar (AHC DL ST)
- 2015: New York Giants (LB intern)
- 2016: Chattanooga (DL)
- 2016–2018: Richmond (DL)
- 2019: Toronto Argonauts (DL)
- 2020–2021: Ottawa Redblacks (DL)

Head coaching record
- Overall: 8–36

Carey Isiah Bailey (born January 16, 1969) is an American gridiron football coach and former player. Bailey served as the head football coach at Howard University in Washington, D.C. from 2007 to 2010, compiling a record of 8–36.

== Early years and playing career ==
Bailey graduated from Morgantown High School in Morgantown, West Virginia in 1987. He was an All-America nose guard and an all-state center for the Mohigans in 1986.

Bailey is an alumnus of the University of Tennessee and a former defensive tackle on the Volunteers football team. He was a four-year letterman for Johnny Majors and was a member of the 1989 and 1990 Southeastern Conference (SEC) championship teams. As a junior, Bailey led the Volunteers in sacks and tackles for loss. While he was at Tennessee, the Volunteers participated in the 1988 Peach Bowl, 1990 Cotton Bowl Classic, 1991 Sugar Bowl, and the 1992 Fiesta Bowl. Bailey graduated in 1992 with a Bachelor of Arts in sociology.

== Coaching career ==
=== West Virginia ===
Bailey began his coaching career in 1993 as a graduate assistant at West Virginia University under head coach Don Nehlen. He worked with the defensive secondary and in strength and conditioning. During his first year in Morgantown, the 1993 West Virginia Mountaineers football team went undefeated and won the Big East Conference championship. In 1994, Bailey worked with a secondary that led the Big East in interceptions. He coached with West Virginia in the 1994 Sugar Bowl and the 1995 Carquest Bowl (January).

=== VMI ===
Bailey served as the defensive ends coach at the Virginia Military Institute (VMI) from 1995 to 1997. While at VMI He developed the Keydet defensive line into one of the best in the Southern Conference and guided two of his pupils to postseason recognition.

=== Louisiana–Lafayette ===
Bailey coached at the University of Louisiana at Lafayette for five seasons under three different head coaches—Nelson Stokley, Jerry Baldwin, and Rickey Bustle. He served as linebackers coach in 1998 and defensive tackles coach from 1999 to 2002. The Ragin' Cajuns led the Sun Belt Conference in sacks during the 2001 season. They also led the conference in punt returns for the 2001 and 2002 football seasons.

=== Middle Tennessee ===
In 2003, Bailey served as defensive line coach at Middle Tennessee State University for head coach Andy McCollum. He improved a defensive line that had finished nearly last in every statistical category the year before, to the top three in sacks, tackles for loss, and quarterback hurries.

=== Oklahoma State ===
Bailey became the defensive line coach at Oklahoma State University in February 2004, where he worked for head coach Les Miles. While at Oklahoma State, the Cowboys finished the 2004 season leading the Big 12 Conference in turnover margin, turnovers gained, fumbles recovered and earned a berth in the 2004 Alamo Bowl.

=== Minnesota ===
Bailey was the defensive line coach at the University of Minnesota from 2005 to 2006, where he worked under Glen Mason. In his first year at Minnesota, three of his pupils earned All-Big Ten honors which included the Big Ten Conference Defensive Newcomer of the Year and first team freshman All-America Steve Davis. In 2005, Minnesota defeated Michigan for the first time in 19 years to recapture the Little Brown Jug given to the winner of the 100 plus year-old rivalry. During the 2006 season the defensive line accounted for 20.5 sacks. The Minnesota defense led the Big Ten in turnover margin, red zone defense, and turnovers gained. Another pupil of Bailey, defensive end William VanDeSteeg, led the Big Ten in sacks during the 2006 season (conference games). While at Minnesota, the Golden Gophers participated in the 2005 Music City Bowl, and the 2006 Insight Bowl.

=== Howard ===
On February 17, 2007, Bailey was named head football coach at Howard University. While leading the Bison, he produced four first-team All-America players (Sheridan Broadcast Network), and eleven All-Mid-Eastern Athletic Conference (MEAC) players. Bailey resigned from his position on December 6, 2010.

=== Lamar ===
Bailey accepted the position of defensive line coach at Lamar University on February 16, 2012. In his first season, the Lamar defense produced its best performance since joining the Southland Conference, and two of Bailey's pupils garnered All-Conference recognition. In 2013, the Lamar defense recorded its highest sack total in school history. Defensive end Jesse Dickson became Lamar's first All-America (TSN) and first two-time All-Conference defensive lineman in the modern era. The 2013 Conference Defensive Player of the Year (College Sports Madness) was the conference leader in tackles for loss. Dickson led the team in tackles, tackles for loss and sacks under Bailey's tutelage. Dickson was the only defensive lineman to finish ranked in the top 10 for tackles in the Southland Conference.

In 2013, Bailey was given charge of the defensive kicking teams. The punt return unit that finished the 2013 season ranked #2 nationally (NCAA-FCS) and led the Southland conference in punt returns. The #2 NCAA ranking was an improvement of 88 spots from the previous year. Punt returner Kevin Johnson was named National Punt Returner of the Year (CFPA) and earned All-Conference honors. On February 4, 2014, Bailey was promoted to assistant head coach.

Lamar finished the 2014 football season with an 8–4 record and a #3 ranking in the Southland Conference. The 8 win mark was the most wins since the bringing the program back in 2010, and tied a school record for most wins in program history. Bailey guided a defensive front in which the entire starting unit received all-conference recognition, highlighted by the second team selection of sophomore Omar Tebo. Bailey also helped the Lamar defense set a school record for sacks, lead the Southland Conference in fumbles recovered and finish 11th nationally in turnovers gained.

In 2015, Bailey coached a defense that led the Southland conference in turnovers gained and finished third in tackles for loss. He also tutored another All-Conference performer for the Cardinals in Larance Hale. Hale was the most productive defensive lineman in the Southland conference. The First Team All-Conference selection was the second leading tackler for the Cardinals and the team leader in forced fumbles, while finishing first among all Southland conference defensive linemen in sacks (7.5), tackles (86) and tackles for loss (21.5). Hale also finished ninth in tackles and was fifth in forced fumbled among all defensive players in the Southland Conference.

=== Atlanta Falcons ===
In June 2012, Bailey was selected to participate in the Bill Walsh Fellowship program with the Atlanta Falcons of the National Football League (NFL). Bailey worked with the linebackers during the 2012 pre-season training camp.

=== New York Giants ===
In May 2015, Bailey was selected once again to participate in the Bill Walsh Fellowship program as a coaching intern, this time with the New York Giants. He worked with the linebackers and coached through the first preseason game against the Cincinnati Bengals.

=== Chattanooga ===
On January 18, 2016, Bailey was named defensive line coach at the University of Tennessee at Chattanooga. During the 2016 season the Mocs defensive line was of the best in all of FCS. The Chattanooga defense led the Southern Conference and set a school record for team sacks with 38, of which 30 were from the defensive line. Defensive ends Keionta Davis and Vantrell McMillan both earned first team all Southern Conference recognition. Davis was also named First Team All-American and the Southern Conference Defensive Player of the Year. Hero sports named Davis the top defensive end in FCS and the Top NFL prospect at his position. Chattanooga finished the 2016 campaign ranked 10th in the country with a 9-–4record, while finishing 6th in total defense (up 27 spots from 2015), 9th in scoring defense (up 30 spots from 2015) and 12th in sacks (up 11 spots from 2015).

=== Richmond ===
On December 18, 2016, Bailey was named defensive line coach at the University of Richmond after former Chattanooga head coach Russ Huesman was named head football coach.

In 2017, Richmond finished the regular season with the 8th highest sack total in the FCS and set a school record for sacks per game. Bailey tutored two all CAA conference selections in DT Andrew Clyde (first team) and DE Brandon Waller (third team). Clyde ended the regular season as the conference sack leader, and earned 3rd Team All-America recognition (STATS/FCS). Freshman Colby Ritten earned Freshman All-America (Hero Sports) honors after an outstanding rookie campaign.

In 2018, Bailey fielded a unit that continued to be a dominant force in the CAA. Clyde and Maurice Jackson formed the most sack productive defensive line in all of the CAA, out-sacking every other line in the league by at least five sacks. Jackson led the way with a career-high 10.5 sacks on the season, leading the CAA in sacks and ranking sixth in the FCS in sacks. He also led the conference in tackles for loss with 15.0 and in forced fumbles with four. Jackson, who came to Richmond as a safety, played his first full season as a defensive end for the Spiders and ranked seventh in the country in forced fumbles. He was named the CAA Defensive Player of the Week for the final game of the regular season and earned his first career All America and All-Conference honor. He did this while playing in just 10 games, missing a game and a half due to injury. Clyde earned his second-straight All-Conference accolade with this year's First Team honor. The preseason All-America selection lived up to his hype with 6.5 sacks on the season, ranking seventh in the CAA. All 6.5 of his sacks came in league play as he led the CAA in sacks during conference play. He added two fumble recoveries on the season and finished his career second all-time in Richmond football history with 25.0 career sacks. Clyde played and started all 50 games of his career, never missing a start in his four years on the field.

=== Toronto Argonauts ===
In January 2019, Bailey became the defensive line coach for the Toronto Argonauts of the Canadian Football League (CFL). During the 2019 season, the Argos finished the regular season tied for fifth in sacks after finishing last in 2018. Defensive tackle Cleyon Laing was named an Eastern Conference All-Star and finished the 2019 season one sack shy of matching a career high despite missing three games due to a knee injury.

=== Ottawa Redblacks ===
In February 2020, Bailey became the defensive line coach for the Ottawa Redblacks of the CFL. After the 2020 CFL season was cancelled Bailey returned to coach the defensive line for the 2021 season in which DE Praise Martin-Oguike and DT Davon Coleman established themselves as two of the most productive defenders in the CFL.

== Head coaching record ==
Year	Team	Overall	Conference	Standing	Bowl/playoffs
Howard Bison (Mid-Eastern Athletic Conference) (2007–2010)
2007	Howard	4–7	3–6	T–7th	
2008	Howard	1–10	0–8	9th	
2009	Howard	2–9	0–8	9th	
2010	Howard	1–10	0–8	9th	
Howard:		8–36	3–30		
Total:		8–36			
