= 2007 Alcorn State Braves football team =

American college football season

2007 Alcorn State Braves football
- Conference: Southwestern Athletic Conference
- East Division
- Record: 2–8 (2–7 SWAC)
- Head coach: Johnny Thomas (10th season)
- Offensive coordinator: John McKenzie (8th season)
- Home stadium: Jack Spinks Stadium

2007 Southwestern Athletic Conference football standings
	Conf.			Overall
Team	W		L	W		L
East Division
Jackson State xy$	7	–	2	8	–	4
Alabama A&M	6	–	3	3	–	3
Alabama State	4	–	5	5	–	6
Mississippi Valley State	2	–	7	3	–	8
Alcorn State	2	–	7	2	–	8
West Division
No. 25 Grambling State xy	8	–	1	8	–	4
Southern	6	–	3	8	–	3
Prairie View A&M	6	–	3	7	–	3
Arkansas–Pine Bluff	4	–	5	4	–	7
Texas Southern	0	–	9	0	–	11
Championship: Jackson State 42, Grambling State 31
$ – Conference champion; x – Division champion/co-champions; y – Championship game participant; Rankings from The Sports Network Poll

The 2007 Alcorn State Braves football team represented Alcorn State University as a member of the Southwestern Athletic Conference (SWAC) during the 2007 NCAA Division I FCS football season. Led by tenth-year head coach Johnny Thomas, the Braves compiled an overall record of 2–8, with a conference record of 2–7, and finished fifth in the SWAC East Division.

== Schedule ==
Date	Opponent	Site	Result	Attendance	Source
September 1	Grambling State	Jack Spinks Stadium; Lorman, MS	L 10–31	16,960	
September 6	Arkansas–Pine Bluff	Jack Spinks Stadium; Lorman, MS	L 3–21		
September 15	at UAB*	Legion Field; Birmingham, AL	L 0–22	21,828	
September 22	at Alabama State	Cramton Bowl; Montgomery, AL	L 25–28	11,276	
October 6	Prairie View A&M	Jack Spinks Stadium; Lorman, MS	L 7–17		
October 13	at Texas Southern	Alexander Durley Sports Complex; Houston, TX	W 22–20		
October 20	at Southern	A. W. Mumford Stadium; Baton Rouge, LA	L 10–14		
November 3	Mississippi Valley State	Jack Spinks Stadium; Lorman, MS	W 17–14		
November 10	Alabama A&M	Jack Spinks Stadium; Lorman, MS	L 20–24		
November 17	at Jackson State	Mississippi Veterans Memorial Stadium; Jackson, MS (Soul Bowl)	L 19–31		
*Non-conference game
