= 2007 Delaware State Hornets football team =

American college football season

2007 Delaware State Hornets football

Black college national champion MEAC champion

NCAA Division I First Round, L 7–44 vs. Delaware
- Conference: Mid-Eastern Athletic Conference

Ranking
- Sports Network: No. 15
- Record: 10–2 (9–0 MEAC)
- Head coach: Al Lavan (4th season)
- Offensive coordinator: Doug Sams (1st season)
- Defensive coordinator: Rayford Petty (1st season)
- Home stadium: Alumni Stadium

2007 Mid-Eastern Athletic Conference football standings
	Conf.			Overall
Team	W		L	W		L
No. 15 Delaware State $^	9	–	0	10	–	2
Norfolk State	7	–	2	8	–	3
South Carolina State	7	–	2	7	–	4
Hampton	5	–	4	6	–	5
Winston-Salem State	5	–	4	6	–	5
Morgan State	4	–	5	5	–	6
Bethune–Cookman	3	–	6	5	–	6
Howard	3	–	6	4	–	7
Florida A&M	2	–	7	3	–	8
North Carolina A&T	0	–	9	0	–	11
$ – Conference champion; ^ – FCS playoff participant; Rankings from The Sports Network poll

The 2007 Delaware State Hornets football team represented Delaware State University as a member of the Mid-Eastern Athletic Conference (MEAC) in the 2007 NCAA Division I FCS football season. They were led by fourth-year head coach Al Lavan and played their home games at Alumni Stadium. They finished the season with 10–2 overall, won the MEAC title with a 9–0 mark in conference play and lost to Delaware in the First Round of the NCAA Division I playoffs. The 2007 Hornets squad won the black college football national championship as awarded by the American Sports Wire and as the national runner-up behind Tuskegee as awarded by SBN.

== Schedule ==
Date	Time	Opponent	Rank	Site	TV	Result	Attendance	Source
September 1	7:00 p.m.	Coastal Carolina*		Alumni Stadium; Dover, DE		W 23–18	3,248	
September 8	6:00 p.m.	at Florida A&M		Bragg Memorial Stadium; Tallahassee, FL		W 20–7	14,327	
September 15	4:00 p.m.	at Kent State*		Dix Stadium; Kent, OH		L 7–38	8,455	
September 29	1:00 p.m.	at No. 13 Hampton		Armstrong Stadium; Hampton, VA		W 24–17	7,195	
October 4	7:30 p.m.	Bethune-Cookman		Alumni Stadium; Dover, DE	ESPNU	W 24–10	3,239	
October 13	1:30 p.m.	at North Carolina A&T		Aggie Stadium; Greensboro, NC		W 27–0	9,934	
October 20	3:30 p.m.	Morgan State^{†}	No. 15	Alumni Stadium; Dover, DE	Comcast CN8	W 25–17	5,446	
October 27	1:30 p.m.	at South Carolina State	No. 12	Oliver C. Dawson Stadium; Orangeburg, SC		W 17–16	15,388	
November 3	2:00 p.m.	at Winston-Salem State	No. 12	Bowman Gray Stadium; Winston-Salem, NC		W 23–20	15,432	
November 10	12:00 p.m.	Norfolk State	No. 10	Alumni Stadium; Dover, DE		W 28–21 ^{OT}	6,682	
November 17	12:00 p.m.	Howard	No. 10	Alumni Stadium; Dover, DE	Comcast/SND (tape delay)	W 29–13	1,985	
November 23	1:30 p.m.	at No. 13 Delaware*	No. 9	Delaware Stadium; Newark, DE (NCAA Division I First Round, rivalry)	ESPN	L 7–44	19,765	
*Non-conference game; ^{†}Homecoming; Rankings from The Sports Network Poll released prior to the game; All times are in Eastern time
