= 2007 North Carolina A&T Aggies football team =

American college football season

2007 North Carolina A&T Aggies football
- Conference: Mid-Eastern Athletic Conference
- Record: 0–11 (0–9 MEAC)
- Head coach: Lee Fobbs (2nd season)
- Home stadium: Aggie Stadium

2007 Mid-Eastern Athletic Conference football standings
	Conf.			Overall
Team	W		L	W		L
No. 15 Delaware State $^	9	–	0	10	–	2
Norfolk State	7	–	2	8	–	3
South Carolina State	7	–	2	7	–	4
Hampton	5	–	4	6	–	5
Winston-Salem State	5	–	4	6	–	5
Morgan State	4	–	5	5	–	6
Bethune–Cookman	3	–	6	5	–	6
Howard	3	–	6	4	–	7
Florida A&M	2	–	7	3	–	8
North Carolina A&T	0	–	9	0	–	11
$ – Conference champion; ^ – FCS playoff participant; Rankings from The Sports Network poll

The 2007 North Carolina A&T Aggies football team represented North Carolina A&T State University as a member of the Mid-Eastern Athletic Conference (MEAC) during the 2007 NCAA Division I FCS football season. Led by second-year head coach Lee Fobbs, the Aggies compiled an overall record of 0–11, with a mark of 0–9 in conference play, and finished tenth in the MEAC.

== Schedule ==
Date	Opponent	Site	Result	Attendance	Source
September 1	at Winston-Salem State	Bowman Gray Stadium; Winston-Salem, NC (rivalry)	L 7–28	22,000	
September 8	vs. Prairie View A&M*	Los Angeles Memorial Coliseum; Los Angeles, CA (Angel City Classic)	L 7–22	32,278	
September 15	No. 13 Hampton	Aggie Stadium; Greensboro, NC	L 14–59	12,547	
September 22	North Carolina Central*	Aggie Stadium; Greensboro, NC (rivalry)	L 22–27	19,320	
September 27	Norfolk State	Aggie Stadium; Greensboro, NC	L 20–50	9,409	
October 6	at Morgan State	Hughes Stadium; Baltimore, MD	L 17–22	8,923	
October 13	Delaware State	Aggie Stadium; Greensboro, NC	L 0–27	9,934	
October 20	at Howard	William H. Greene Stadium; Washington, DC	L 27–35	7,035	
October 27	Bethune–Cookman^{†}	Aggie Stadium; Greensboro, NC	L 20–24	20,013	
November 3	at Florida A&M	Bragg Memorial Stadium; Tallahassee, FL	L 21–24	23,984	
November 17	vs. South Carolina State	Johnson Hagood Stadium; Charleston, SC (Lowcountry Classic, rivalry)	L 7–51	13,083	
*Non-conference game; ^{†}Homecoming; Rankings from The Sports Network Poll released prior to the game
