= 2007 Charleston Southern Buccaneers football team =

American college football season

2007 Charleston Southern Buccaneers football
- Conference: Big South Conference
- Record: 5–6 (1–3 Big South)
- Head coach: Jay Mills (5th season)
- Offensive coordinator: Jamey Chadwell (4th season)
- Home stadium: Buccaneer Field

2007 Big South Conference football standings
	Conf.			Overall
Team	W		L	W		L
Liberty $	4	–	0	8	–	3
Coastal Carolina	3	–	1	5	–	6
Gardner–Webb	2	–	2	5	–	6
Charleston Southern	1	–	3	5	–	6
VMI	0	–	4	2	–	9
$ – Conference champion

The 2007 Charleston Southern Buccaneers football team represented Charleston Southern University as a member of the Big South Conference during the 2007 NCAA Division I FCS football season. Led by fifth-year head coach Jay Mills, the Buccaneers compiled an overall record of 5–6 with a mark of 1–3 in conference play, finishing fourth place in the Big South.

== Schedule ==
Date	Time	Opponent	Site	TV	Result	Attendance	Source
September 1	2:00 pm	at The Citadel*	Johnson Hagood Stadium; Charleston, SC	BI	L 14–35	12,885	
September 8	7:00 pm	at No. 14 Wofford*	Gibbs Stadium; Spartanburg, SC		L 24–52	5,879	
September 15	1:30 pm	Johnson C. Smith*	Buccaneer Field; Charleston, SC		W 44–20	2,384	
September 22	12:05 am	at No. 19 Hawaii*	Aloha Stadium; Halawa, HI	Oceanic PPV, KFVE (delayed)	L 10–66	37,723	
September 29	7:00 pm	at North Greenville*	Younts Stadium; Tigerville, SC		W 46–33	3,912	
October 6	1:30 pm	Savannah State*^{†}	Buccaneer Field; Charleston, SC		W 28–0	10,758	
October 20	1:30 pm	Liberty	Buccaneer Field; Charleston, SC		L 10–50	3,461	
October 27	6:30 pm	at Gardner–Webb	Ernest W. Spangler Stadium; Boiling Springs, NC		L 25–29	5,250	
November 3	1:00 pm	at VMI	Alumni Memorial Field; Lexington, VA		W 37–28	4,526	
November 10	1:30 pm	Presbyterian*	Buccaneer Field; Charleston, SC		W 28–24	3,542	
November 17	12:00 pm	Coastal Carolina	Buccaneer Field; Charleston, SC		L 2–41	3,965	
*Non-conference game; ^{†}Homecoming; Rankings from The Sports Network Poll released prior to the game; All times are in Eastern time
