= 2007 VMI Keydets football team =

American college football season

2007 VMI Keydets football
- Conference: Big South Conference
- Record: 2–9 (0–4 Big South)
- Head coach: Jim Reid (2nd season)
- Offensive coordinator: Brent Davis (2nd season)
- Offensive scheme: Option
- Defensive coordinator: Vince Sinagra (2nd season)
- Base defense: 4–3
- Home stadium: Alumni Memorial Field

2007 Big South Conference football standings
	Conf.			Overall
Team	W		L	W		L
Liberty $	4	–	0	8	–	3
Coastal Carolina	3	–	1	5	–	6
Gardner–Webb	2	–	2	5	–	6
Charleston Southern	1	–	3	5	–	6
VMI	0	–	4	2	–	9
$ – Conference champion

The 2007 VMI Keydets football team represented the Virginia Military Institute during the 2007 NCAA Division I FCS football season. It was the Keydets' 117th year of football, and their 5th season in the Big South Conference.

The Keydets finished the season with a 2–9 record, one more win than the previous season. It was the last year under head coach Jim Reid, who resigned after season's end with a 3–19 record at VMI.

== Schedule ==
Date	Time	Opponent	Site	Result	Attendance	Source
September 1	1:00 pm	Lock Haven*	Alumni Memorial Field; Lexington, VA	W 20–0	5,862	
September 8	1:00 pm	William & Mary*	Alumni Memorial Field; Lexington, VA (rivalry)	L 16–63	6,830	
September 15	6:00 pm	at No. 9 James Madison*	Bridgeforth Stadium; Harrisonburg, VA	L 17–45	15,083	
September 22	1:00 pm	at Lehigh*	Goodman Stadium; Bethlehem, PA	L 6–37	6,550	
September 29	1:00 pm	at Robert Morris*	Joe Walton Stadium; Moon Township, PA	W 40–13	2,157	
October 13	1:00 pm	Presbyterian^{†}	Alumni Memorial Field; Lexington, VA	L 21–45	6,433	
October 20	1:00 pm	Gardner–Webb	Alumni Memorial Field; Lexington, VA	L 22–36	8,367	
October 27	7:00 pm	at Coastal Carolina	Brooks Stadium; Conway, SC	L 35–42	7,048	
November 3	1:00 pm	Charleston Southern	Alumni Memorial Field; Lexington, VA	L 28–37	4,526	
November 7	1:00 pm	at Liberty	Williams Stadium; Lynchburg, VA	L 34–73	14,273	
November 17	12:00 pm	The Citadel*	Alumni Memorial Field; Lexington, VA (Military Classic of the South)	L 28–70	9,183	
*Non-conference game; ^{†}Homecoming; Rankings from The Sports Network Poll released prior to the game
