= 2007 Prairie View A&M Panthers football team =

American college football season

2007 Prairie View A&M Panthers football
- Conference: Southwestern Athletic Conference
- West Division
- Record: 7–3 (6–3 SWAC)
- Head coach: Henry Frazier III (4th season)
- Home stadium: Edward L. Blackshear Field

2007 Southwestern Athletic Conference football standings
| | Conf. | | | Overall |
| Team | W | | L | W | | L |
|---|---|---|---|---|---|---|
East Division
| Jackson State xy$ | 7 | – | 2 | 8 | – | 4 |
| Alabama A&M | 6 | – | 3 | 3 | – | 3 |
| Alabama State | 4 | – | 5 | 5 | – | 6 |
| Mississippi Valley State | 2 | – | 7 | 3 | – | 8 |
| Alcorn State | 2 | – | 7 | 2 | – | 8 |
West Division
| No. 25 Grambling State xy | 8 | – | 1 | 8 | – | 4 |
| Southern | 6 | – | 3 | 8 | – | 3 |
| Prairie View A&M | 6 | – | 3 | 7 | – | 3 |
| Arkansas–Pine Bluff | 4 | – | 5 | 4 | – | 7 |
| Texas Southern | 0 | – | 9 | 0 | – | 11 |
Championship: Jackson State 42, Grambling State 31
$ – Conference champion; x – Division champion/co-champions; y – Championship game participant; Rankings from The Sports Network Poll

The 2007 Prairie View A&M Panthers football team represented Prairie View A&M University as a member of the Southwestern Athletic Conference (SWAC) during the 2007 NCAA Division I FCS football season. Led by fourth-year head coach Henry Frazier III, the Panthers compiled an overall record of 7–3, with a mark of 6–3 in conference play, and finished tied for second in the SWAC West Division.

== Schedule ==
| Date | Opponent | Site | Result | Attendance | Source |
|---|---|---|---|---|---|
| September 1 | at Texas Southern | Reliant Stadium; Houston, TX (Labor Day Classic) | W 34–14 | | |
| September 8 | vs. North Carolina A&T* | Los Angeles Memorial Coliseum; Los Angeles, CA (Angel City Classic) | W 22–7 | 32,278 | |
| September 15 | at Southern | A. W. Mumford Stadium; Baton Rouge, LA | L 2–12 | | |
| September 29 | vs. Grambling State | Cotton Bowl; Dallas, TX (State Fair Classic) | L 14–17 | 55,878 | |
| October 6 | at Alcorn State | Jack Spinks Stadium; Lorman, MS | W 17–7 | | |
| October 13 | at Alabama State | Cramton Bowl; Montgomery, AL | W 17–6 | | |
| October 27 | Mississippi Valley State | Edward L. Blackshear Field; Prairie View, TX | W 26–21 | | |
| November 3 | at Arkansas–Pine Bluff | Golden Lion Stadium; Pine Bluff, AR | L 19–21 | | |
| November 10 | Jackson State | Edward L. Blackshear Field; Prairie View, TX | W 30–27 | 7,224 | |
| November 17 | Alabama A&M | Edward L. Blackshear Field; Prairie View, TX | W 30–20 | | |
*Non-conference game
