= 2007 South Carolina State Bulldogs football team =

American college football season

2007 South Carolina State Bulldogs football
- Conference: Mid-Eastern Athletic Conference
- Record: 7–4 (7–2 MEAC)
- Head coach: Oliver Pough (6th season)
- Home stadium: Oliver C. Dawson Stadium

2007 Mid-Eastern Athletic Conference football standings
	Conf.			Overall
Team	W		L	W		L
No. 15 Delaware State $^	9	–	0	10	–	2
Norfolk State	7	–	2	8	–	3
South Carolina State	7	–	2	7	–	4
Hampton	5	–	4	6	–	5
Winston-Salem State	5	–	4	6	–	5
Morgan State	4	–	5	5	–	6
Bethune–Cookman	3	–	6	5	–	6
Howard	3	–	6	4	–	7
Florida A&M	2	–	7	3	–	8
North Carolina A&T	0	–	9	0	–	11
$ – Conference champion; ^ – FCS playoff participant; Rankings from The Sports Network poll

The 2007 South Carolina State Bulldogs football team represented South Carolina State University as a member of the Mid-Eastern Athletic Conference (MEAC) during the 2007 NCAA Division I FCS football season. Led by sixth-year head coach Oliver Pough, the Bulldogs compiled an overall record of 7–4, with a mark of 7–2 in conference play, and finished tied for second in the MEAC.

== Schedule ==
Date	Opponent	Site	Result	Attendance	Source
September 1	at Air Force*	Falcon Stadium; Colorado Springs, CO	L 3–34	39,364	
September 8	at Bethune–Cookman	Municipal Stadium; Daytona Beach, FL	W 24–13	9,147	
September 15	at No. 17 (FBS) South Carolina*	Williams–Brice Stadium; Columbia, SC	L 3–38	73,095	
September 22	Winston-Salem State	Oliver C. Dawson Stadium; Orangeburg, SC	W 20–7	8,222	
October 6	at Norfolk State	William "Dick" Price Stadium; Norfolk, VA	L 13–20 ^{2OT}	12,217	
October 13	Florida A&M	Oliver C. Dawson Stadium; Orangeburg, SC	W 49–14	21,500	
October 20	at Hampton	Armstrong Stadium; Hampton, VA	W 28–24	14,625	
October 27	No. 12 Delaware State	Oliver C. Dawson Stadium; Orangeburg, SC	L 16–17	15,388	
November 3	at Howard	William H. Greene Stadium; Washington, DC	W 59–21		
November 10	Morgan State	Oliver C. Dawson Stadium; Orangeburg, SC	W 28–21 ^{OT}		
November 17	vs. North Carolina A&T	Johnson Hagood Stadium; Charleston, SC (Lowcountry Classic, rivalry)	W 51–7	13,083	
*Non-conference game; Rankings from The Sports Network Poll released prior to the game
