= 2007 Savannah State Tigers football team =

American college football season

2007 Savannah State Tigers football
- Conference: Independent
- Record: 1–9
- Head coach: Theo Lemon (2nd season)
- Offensive coordinator: John W. Montgomery (2nd season)
- Offensive scheme: Smashmouth
- Defensive coordinator: Julius Dixon (2nd season)
- Base defense: 4–4
- Home stadium: Ted Wright Stadium; Memorial Stadium

2007 NCAA Division I FCS independents football standings
	Conf.			Overall
Team	W		L	W		L
Western Kentucky		–		7	–	5
Stony Brook		–		6	–	5
Presbyterian		–		6	–	5
Savannah State		–		1	–	9

The 2007 Savannah State Tigers football team competed in American football on behalf of the Savannah State University in the 2007 NCAA Division I FCS football season as an independent. This was the team's second season under the guidance of head coach Theo Lemon.

== Schedule ==
Date	Time	Opponent	Site	Result	Attendance	Source
August 30	7:00 p.m.	at Morgan State*	Hughes Stadium; Baltimore, MD	L 7–47	952	
September 7	1:00 p.m.	Johnson C. Smith*	Memorial Stadium; Savannah, GA	W 24–10	12,448	
September 15	1:00 p.m.	Bethune–Cookman*	Memorial Stadium; Savannah, GA	L 13–45	15,126	
September 29	5:00 p.m.	at Fort Valley State*	Wildcat Stadium; Fort Valley, GA	L 2–33	13,218	
October 6	1:30 p.m.	at Charleston Southern*	Buccaneer Field; Charleston, SC	L 0–28	10,758	
October 13	7:00 p.m.	at Morehouse*	B. T. Harvey Stadium; Atlanta, GA	L 14–32	15,250	
October 20	1:00 p.m.	North Carolina Central*	Memorial Stadium; Savannah, GA	L 14–30	12,956	
October 27	2:00 p.m.	Edward Waters*	Ted Wright Stadium; Savannah, GA	L 7–24	14,009	
November 3	1:30 p.m.	at Gardner–Webb*	Spangler Stadium; Boiling Springs, NC	L 0–66	13,906	
November 17	2:00 p.m.	Mississippi Valley State*	Ted Wright Stadium; Savannah, GA	L 3–28	12,761	
*Non-conference game; All times are in Eastern time

== Roster ==
2007 Savannah State Tigers by position
Quarterbacks: 3 JaCorey Kilcrease – Sophomore; 5 Greg McCrary – Freshman; 14 Don Jackson – Freshman; Running Backs: 20 Justin Babb – Freshman; 22 Antwan Edwards – Freshman; 23 Sean Evans – Sophomore; 28 Reginald May – Junior; 30 Charles Huggins – Sophomore; 32 Reggie Williams – Freshman; 40 Chad Morgan – Freshman; Wide Receivers: 6 Byron Leggett – Freshman; 7 Bernard Coleman – Junior; 9 Deleon Hollinger – Sophomore; 10 Anthony Bowden – Sophomore; 11 Isaiah Osborne – Junior; 17 Tyron Kirkland – Junior; 18 DeAndre Blackmon – Freshman; 21 Chris Rhines – Freshman; 80 Kennell Thompson – Freshman; 81 A.J. Denson – Freshman; 82 Robert Frazier – Sophomore; 85 Stefon Taylor – Freshman; Tight Ends: 87 Steven Veasy – Sophomore; 88 Joshua Marshall – Sophomore	Fullbacks: 35 Jamie Beard – Senior; Offensive Line: 39 Lewis Hall – Sophomore; 59 Derrick Dorsey – Sophomore; 60 Kevin Thompson – Freshman; 63 Bill Pester – Freshman; 64 Justin Norton – Junior; 65 Warren Washington – Junior; 66 Rashad Jackson – Senior; 67 Albert Newsome – Freshman; 68 Cyril Owusu – Freshman; 70 William Edwards – Freshman; 72 Brandon Patterson – Freshman; 73 Kenny Andrew – Junior; 74 Algernon Wright – Sophomore; 76 Dan Johnson – Freshman; 77 Devin Rice – Sophomore; Defensive Line: 50 LaDarien Redfield – Freshman; 54 Ivan Sharpe – Freshman; 55 Dominique Clark – Senior; 90 Cordero Campbell – Freshman; 91 Chris Reed – Sophomore; 92 Randy Harling – Senior; 93 Brandon Miller – Sophomore; 94 Jason Lynn – Freshman; 95 Keith Holmes – Sophomore; 96 Joe Myles – Freshman; 98 Roland Jackson – Senior	Linebackers: 12 Frank Usher – Junior; 26 Antwan Allen – Sophomore; 31 Morris Drayton – Junior; 43 Jeffrey Robertson – Freshman; 45 DeAngelo Jenkins – Freshman; 46 J. Vince Cochran – Freshman; 47 Joudon Butler – Freshman; 48 Chris Bawlson – Junior; 51 Calvin Leonard – Junior; 52 Anton Williams – Freshman; 53 Willie Hall – Sophomore; 56 Jonathan Stewart – Senior; Defensive Backs: 1 Marcus Darrisaw -Junior; 4 Jamar Graham -Freshman; 8 Javorris Jackson -Junior; 15 Chris Herans -Junior; 19 Jeremy Boston -Junior; 25 Rashad Curry -Freshman; 27 Jared Turner -Freshman; 29 Karnell Feagins -Freshman; 33 Antoine Stewart -Senior; 37 Darren Hunter -Freshman; 42 Charles Arrington -Freshman; Kickers / Punters: 16 Luis Justiniano – Sophomore; 84 Cheick Diop – Freshman; 13 Brandon Webster – Freshman; 49 Jeremy Johnson – Senior

== Statistics ==
=== Team ===
	Team	Opp
Scoring	84	343
Points per game	8.4	34.3
First downs	116	194
Rushing	61	99
Passing	39	75
Penalty	16	20
Total offense	1,892	3,676
Avg per play	3.2	5.5
Avg per game	189.2	367.6
Fumbles-Lost	17–14	13–7
Penalties-Yards	84–814	100-927
Avg per game	81.4	92.7

	Team	Opp
Punts-Yards	64–2,172	41–1,482
Avg per punt	33.9	36.1
Time of possession/Game	28.59	32.31
3rd down conversions	31/135 (23%)	47/127 (37%)
4th down conversions	5/26 (19%)	3/14 (21%)
Touchdowns scored	11	42
Field goals-Attempts-Long	2-6-	17-21-
PAT-Attempts	10–11 (91%)	38–41 (93%)
Attendance	18,552	17,040
Games/Avg per Game	5/3,710	5/3,408

==== Scores by quarter ====
	1	2	3	4	Total
Savannah State	14	20	23	27	84
Opponents	74	108	58	103	343

=== Offense ===
==== Rushing ====
Name	GP-GS	Att	Gain	Loss	Net	Avg	TD	Long	Avg/G
EDWARDS, Antwan	10–6	126	516	76	440	3.5	1	47	44.0
BABB, Justin	10–0	39	162	15	147	3.8	0	24	14.7
MAY, Reginald	5–2	28	102	3	99	3.5	0	16	19.8
WILLIAMS, Reggie	10–0	35	105	17	88	2.5	1	24	8.8
BEARD, Jamie	10–8	23	93	12	81	3.5	0	39	8.1
MCCRARY, Greg	7–3	52	183	133	50	1.0	2	25	7.1
KILCREASE, Jacorey	7–5	36	116	68	48	1.3	1	20	6.9
COCHRAN, Vince	9–0	2	11	9	2	1.0	0	11	0.2
RHINES, Chris	9–1	10	28	28	0	0.0	0	18	0.0
HOLLINGER, Deleon	10–7	1	0	1	-1	-1.0	0	0	-0.1
TEAM	4–0	3	0	1	-1	-0.3	0	0	-0.2
WEBSTER, Brandon	2–0	1	0	11	-11	-11.0	0	0	-5.5
JOHNSON, Jeremy	10–0	3	0	43	-43	-14.3	0	0	-4.3
Total	10	359	1316	417	899	2.5	5	47	89.9
Opponents	10	411	2254	220	2034	4.9	26	80	203.4

==== Passing ====
Name	GP-GS	Effic	Cmp-Att-Int	Pct	Yds	TD	Lng	Avg/G
KILCREASE, Jacorey	7–5	83.38	62–126–4	49.2	490	3	45	70.0
MCCRARY, Greg	7–3	59.48	38–95–13	40.0	412	3	94	58.9
RHINES, Chris	9–1	83.22	9–20–0	45.0	91	0	38	10.1
Total	10	73.95	109–241–17	45.2	993	6	94	99.3
Opponents	10	116.68	142–255–11	55.7	1642	12	51	164.2

==== Receiving ====
Name	GP-GS	No.	Yds	Avg	TD	Long	Avg/G
HOLLINGER,Deleon	10–7	31	413	13.3	3	94	41.3
OSBORNE,Isaiah	10–7	23	215	9.3	1	45	21.5
DENSON,A.J.	8–0	11	112	10.2	1	39	14.0
BOWDEN,Anthony	7–1	8	44	5.5	0	9	6.3
EDWARDS,Antwan	10–6	8	26	3.2	0	11	2.6
WILLIAMS,Reggie	10–0	8	4	0.5	0	18	0.4
LEGGETT,Byron	5–1	5	47	9.4	0	20	9.4
RHINES,Chris	9–1	4	34	8.5	0	15	3.8
BABB,Justin	10–0	3	34	11.3	1	34	3.4
KIRKLAND,Tyron	4–0	3	23	7.7	0	14	5.8
FRAZIER,Robert	3–0	2	27	13.5	0	14	9.0
BEARD,Jamie	10–8	2	8	4.0	0	12	0.8
JACKSON,Javorris	10–8	1	6	6.0	0	6	0.6
Total	10	109	993	9.1	6	94	99.3
Opponents	10	142	1642	11.6	12	51	164.2

=== Defense ===
Name	GP	Tackles				Sacks	Pass defense		Interceptions				Fumbles		Blkd Kick
Name	GP	Solo	Ast	Total	TFL-Yds	No-Yds	BrUp	QBH	No.-Yds	Avg	TD	Long	Rcv-Yds	FF	Blkd Kick
ALLEN, Antwan	10	42	40	82	6.5–24	1.5–9	1	0	2–79	39.5	0	48	0	0	0
LEONARD, Calvin	10	29	45	74	5.5–17	2.5–8	1	2	0	0	0	0	0–0	2	0
JACKSON, Javorris	10	37	37	74	2.0–5	0	7	0	5–73	14.6	0	48	0–0	0	0
HERANS, Chris	9	33	38	71	5.5–22	1.0–5	2	0	0	0	0	0	1–0	1	1
CLARK, Dominique	7	20	24	44	8.5–40	4.0–17	1	1	0	0	0	0	0–0	2	0
STEWART, Antione	9	24	15	39	2.0–16	1.0–12	1	0	0	0	0	0	1–0	0	0
USHER, Frank	9	24	9	30	3.5–17	1.0–5	1	1	0	0	0	0	1–0	0	0
DARRISAW, Marcus	9	22	7	29	1.0–4	0	6	0	2–40	20	0	23	0–0	0	0
RICE, Devin	9	9	19	28	2.0–2	0	0	2	0	0	0	0	1–0	1	0
REDFIELD, Ladarien	9	8	19	27	4.0–9	0.5–2	0	1	0	0	0	0	0–0	0	0
GRAHAM, Jamar	10	17	9	26	0	0	6	0	0	0	0	0	0–0	0	0
REED, Chris	10	12	13	25	5.5–13	0.5–2	1	0	0	0	0	0	0–0	1	0
HARLING, Randy	10	9	10	19	4.5–10	0	0	0	0	0	0	0	0–0	0	0
BAWLSON, Chris	7	6	11	17	0	0	0	0	0	0	0	0	0–0	0	0
DRAYTON, Morris	6	5	8	13	0	0	0	0	0	0	0	0	0–0	0	0
HALL, Willie	6	5	6	11	0	0	0	0	1–1	1	0	1	0–0	0	0
CAMPBELL, Cordero	6	4	6	10	2.5–25	2.0–25	0	0	0	0	0	0	0–0	0	0
MILLER, Brandon	4	5	5	10	0	0	0	0	0	0	0	0	1–0	0	0
WILLIAMS, Reggie	10	9	1	10	0	0	0	0	0	0	0	0	0–0	0	0
COCHRAN, Vince	9	5	4	9	1.0–1	0	0	0	0	0	0	0	0–0	0	0
BOSTON, Jeremy	6	6	3	9	0	0	2	0	1–36	36	0	36	0–0	0	0
ROBBERTSON, Jeffrey	6	3	5	8	0	0	0	0	0	0	0	0	0–0	0	0
RHINES, Chris	9	7	1	8	1.0–6	0	0	0	0	0	0	0	0–0	0	0
HOLMES, Keith	5	4	3	7	0	0	0	1	0	0	0	0	0–0	0	0
ARRINGTON, Charles	4	3	3	6	0	0	0	0	0	0	0	0	0–0	0	0
COLEMAN, Bernard	4	4	2	6	0	0	0	0	0	0	0	0	0–0	0	0
FEAGINS, Karnell	2	2	3	5	0	0	0	0	0	0	0	0	0–0	0	0
TURNER, Jared	3	3	2	5	0	0	0	0	0	0	0	0	0–0	0	0
USHER, F. Iv	2	1	3	4	0	1.0–7	0	0	0	0	0	0	1–0	0	0
MYLES, Joe	3	1	3	4	1.0–7	0	0	0	0	0	0	0	0–0	0	0
LYNN, Jason	5	1	2	3	0	0	0	0	0	0	0	0	0–0	0	0
HOLLINGER, Deleon	10	3	0	3	0	0	0	0	0	0	0	0	0–0	0	0
BOWDEN, Anthony	7	3	0	3	0	0	0	0	0	0	0	0	0–0	0	0
TEAM	4	3	0	3	0	0	0	0	0	0	0	0	1–0	0	0
MCCRARY, Greg	7	1	1	2	0.5–1	0	0	0	0	0	0	0	0–0	1	0
JOHNSON, Dan	3	2	0	2	0	0	0	0	0	0	0	0	0–0	0	0
OSBORNE, Isaiah	10	1	1	2	0.5–1	0	0	1	0	0	0	0	0–0	0	0
MARSHALL, Joshua	4	0	2	2	0	0	0	0	0	0	0	0	0–0	0	0
STEWART, Jonathan	1	0	1	1	0	0	0	0	0	0	0	0	0–0	0	0
JOHNSON, Jeremy	10	1	0	1	0	0	0	0	0	0	0	0	0–0	0	0
ALLEN, M.	1	1	0	1	0	0	0	0	0	0	0	0	0–0	0	0
EVANS, Sean	1	1	0	1	0	0	0	0	0	0	0	0	0–0	0	0
KIRKLAND, Tyron	4	1	0	1	0	0	0	0	0	0	0	0	0–0	0	0
BEARD, Jamie	10	1	0	1	0	0	0	0	0	0	0	0	0–0	0	0
BABB, Justin	10	0	1	1	0	0	0	0	0	0	0	0	0–0	0	0
Total	10	375	362	737	57–220	15–92	29	9	11–229	20.8	0	65	7–0	8	1
Opponents	10	324	342	666	95–413	16–121	30	20	17–340	20.0	2	85	14–131	11	4

=== Special teams ===
Name	Punting								Kickoffs				
Name	No.	Yds	Avg	Long	TB	FC	I20	Blkd	No.	Yds	Avg	TB	OB
JOHNSON, Jeremy	60	2098	35.0	50	3	5	4	1	10	415	41.5	0	1
WEBSTER, Brandon	3	74	24.7	33	0	0	0	0	0	0	0	0	0
TEAM	1	0	0	0.0	0	0	0	0	0	0	0	0	0
JUSTINIANO,Luis	0	0	0	0	0	0	0	0	14	596	42.6	0	1
Total	64	2172	33.9	50	3	5	4	1	24	1011	42.1	0	2
Opponents	41	1482	36.1	53	2	6	8	0	68	3749	55.1	3	4

Name	Punt returns					Kick returns				
Name	No.	Yds	Avg	TD	Long	No.	Yds	Avg	TD	Long
DARRISAW, Marcus	11	128	11.6	0	27	4	77	19.2	0	29
DENSON, A.J.	1	10	10.0	0	10	7	103	14.7	0	22
OSBORNE, Isaiah	0	0	0	0	0	14	290	20.7	0	40
BABB, Justin	0	0	0	0	0	13	363	27.9	0	84
BAWLSON, Chris	0	0	0	0	0	4	18	4.5	0	10
EDWARDS, Antwan	0	0	0	0	0	4	35	8.8	0	13
LOVETT, Jalvin	0	0	0	0	0	2	25	12.5	0	15
HALL, Willie	0	0	0	0	0	1	0	0.0	0	0
ROSS, Willie	0	0	0	0	0	1	11	11.0	0	11
VEASY, Steven	0	0	0	0	0	1	4	4.0	0	4
LEGGETT, Byron	0	0	0	0	0	1	20	20.0	0	20
MAY, Reginald	0	0	0	0	0	1	8	8.0	0	8
BOWDEN, Anthony	0	0	0	0	0	1	18	18.0	0	18
Total	12	138	11.5	0	27	54	972	18.0	0	84
Opponents	29	216	7.4	0	32	21	435	20.7	1	83
