= 2007 Jackson State Tigers football team =

American college football season

2007 Jackson State Tigers football

SWAC champion SWAC East Division champion

SWAC Championship Game, W 42–31 vs. Grambling State
- Conference: Southwestern Athletic Conference
- East Division
- Record: 8–4 (7–2 SWAC)
- Head coach: Rick Comegy (2nd season)
- Home stadium: Mississippi Veterans Memorial Stadium

2007 Southwestern Athletic Conference football standings
	Conf.			Overall
Team	W		L	W		L
East Division
Jackson State xy$	7	–	2	8	–	4
Alabama A&M	6	–	3	3	–	3
Alabama State	4	–	5	5	–	6
Mississippi Valley State	2	–	7	3	–	8
Alcorn State	2	–	7	2	–	8
West Division
No. 25 Grambling State xy	8	–	1	8	–	4
Southern	6	–	3	8	–	3
Prairie View A&M	6	–	3	7	–	3
Arkansas–Pine Bluff	4	–	5	4	–	7
Texas Southern	0	–	9	0	–	11
Championship: Jackson State 42, Grambling State 31
$ – Conference champion; x – Division champion/co-champions; y – Championship game participant; Rankings from The Sports Network Poll

The 2007 Jackson State Tigers football team represented Jackson State University as a member of the Southwestern Athletic Conference (SWAC) during the 2007 NCAA Division I FCS football season. Led by second-year head coach Rick Comegy, the Tigers compiled an overall record of 8–4 and a mark of 7–2 in conference play, and finished as SWAC champion after they defeated Grambling State in the SWAC Championship Game.

== Schedule ==
Date	Opponent	Site	Result	Attendance	Source
September 2	Delta State*	Mississippi Veterans Memorial Stadium; Jackson, MS	L 15–27	12,667	
September 8	vs. Tennessee State*	Liberty Bowl Memorial Stadium; Memphis, TN (Southern Heritage Classic)	L 13–16		
September 13	Texas Southern	Mississippi Veterans Memorial Stadium; Jackson, MS	W 28–7		
September 22	at Mississippi Valley State	Rice–Totten Stadium; Itta Bena, MS	W 50–16	11,700	
October 6	Alabama State	Mississippi Veterans Memorial Stadium; Jackson, MS	W 32–20		
October 13	at Southern	A. W. Mumford Stadium; Baton Rouge, LA (rivalry)	W 32–26	24,600	
October 20	No. 23 Grambling State	Mississippi Veterans Memorial Stadium; Jackson, MS	L 20–30	14,501	
October 27	Arkansas–Pine Bluff	Mississippi Veterans Memorial Stadium; Jackson, MS	W 17–6		
November 3	at Alabama A&M	Louis Crews Stadium; Normal, AL	W 43–40 ^{OT}	7,527	
November 10	at Prairie View A&M	Edward L. Blackshear Field; Prairie View, TX	L 27–30	7,224	
November 17	Alcorn State	Mississippi Veterans Memorial Stadium; Jackson, MS (Soul Bowl)	W 31–19		
December 15	vs. Grambling State	Legion Field; Birmingham, AL (SWAC Championship Game)	W 42–31	43,206	
*Non-conference game; Rankings from The Sports Network Poll released prior to the game
