= 2007 Arkansas–Pine Bluff Golden Lions football team =

American college football season

2007 Arkansas–Pine Bluff Golden Lions football
- Conference: Southwestern Athletic Conference
- West Division
- Record: 4–7 (4–5 SWAC)
- Head coach: Mo Forte (4th season)
- Home stadium: Golden Lion Stadium

2007 Southwestern Athletic Conference football standings
	Conf.			Overall
Team	W		L	W		L
East Division
Jackson State xy$	7	–	2	8	–	4
Alabama A&M	6	–	3	3	–	3
Alabama State	4	–	5	5	–	6
Mississippi Valley State	2	–	7	3	–	8
Alcorn State	2	–	7	2	–	8
West Division
No. 25 Grambling State xy	8	–	1	8	–	4
Southern	6	–	3	8	–	3
Prairie View A&M	6	–	3	7	–	3
Arkansas–Pine Bluff	4	–	5	4	–	7
Texas Southern	0	–	9	0	–	11
Championship: Jackson State 42, Grambling State 31
$ – Conference champion; x – Division champion/co-champions; y – Championship game participant; Rankings from The Sports Network Poll

The 2007 Arkansas–Pine Bluff Golden Lions football team represented the University of Arkansas at Pine Bluff as a member of the Southwestern Athletic Conference (SWAC) during the 2007 NCAA Division I FCS football season. Led by fourth-year head coach Mo Forte, the Golden Lions compiled an overall record of 4–7, with a mark of 4–5 in conference play, and finished fourth in the SWAC West Division.

== Schedule ==
Date	Opponent	Site	Result	Attendance	Source
September 1	at Mississippi Valley State	Rice–Totten Stadium; Itta Bena, MS	L 9–16		
September 6	at Alcorn State	Jack Spinks Stadium; Lorman, MS	W 21–3		
September 15	Alabama State	Golden Lion Stadium; Pine Bluff, AR	L 10–12	10,012	
September 22	at No. 7 Southern Illinois*	McAndrew Stadium; Carbondale, IL	L 3–58	11,316	
September 29	at New Mexico State*	Aggie Memorial Stadium; Las Cruces, NM	L 17–20	15,329	
October 13	vs. No. 25 Grambling State	War Memorial Stadium; Little Rock, AR (Delta Classic)	L 24–30	40,067	
October 18	at Alabama A&M	Louis Crews Stadium; Normal, AL	L 14–31		
October 27	at Jackson State	Mississippi Veterans Memorial Stadium; Jackson, MS	L 6–17		
November 3	Prairie View A&M	Golden Lion Stadium; Pine Bluff, AR	W 21–19		
November 10	Southern	Golden Lion Stadium; Pine Bluff, AR	W 23–21		
November 17	at Texas Southern	Alexander Durley Sports Complex; Houston, TX	W 20–10		
*Non-conference game; Rankings from The Sports Network Poll released prior to the game
