= 2007 Alabama State Hornets football team =

American college football season

2007 Alabama State Hornets football
- Conference: Southwestern Athletic Conference
- East Division
- Record: 5–6 (4–5 SWAC)
- Head coach: Reggie Barlow (1st season)
- Home stadium: Cramton Bowl

2007 Southwestern Athletic Conference football standings
	Conf.			Overall
Team	W		L	W		L
East Division
Jackson State xy$	7	–	2	8	–	4
Alabama A&M	6	–	3	3	–	3
Alabama State	4	–	5	5	–	6
Mississippi Valley State	2	–	7	3	–	8
Alcorn State	2	–	7	2	–	8
West Division
No. 25 Grambling State xy	8	–	1	8	–	4
Southern	6	–	3	8	–	3
Prairie View A&M	6	–	3	7	–	3
Arkansas–Pine Bluff	4	–	5	4	–	7
Texas Southern	0	–	9	0	–	11
Championship: Jackson State 42, Grambling State 31
$ – Conference champion; x – Division champion/co-champions; y – Championship game participant; Rankings from The Sports Network Poll

The 2007 Alabama State Hornets football team represented Alabama State University as a member of the Southwestern Athletic Conference (SWAC) during the 2007 NCAA Division I FCS football season. Led by first-year head coach Reggie Barlow, the Hornets compiled an overall record of 5–6, with a mark of 4–5 in conference play, and finished third in the SWAC East Division.

== Schedule ==
Date	Opponent	Site	Result	Attendance	Source
September 1	Jacksonville State*	Cramton Bowl; Montgomery, AL	W 24–19	17,316	
September 8	at Texas Southern	Alexander Durley Sports Complex; Houston, TX	W 21–10		
September 15	at Arkansas–Pine Bluff	Golden Lion Stadium; Pine Bluff, AR	W 12–10	10,012	
September 22	Alcorn State	Cramton Bowl; Montgomery, AL	W 28–25		
September 29	vs. Southern	Ladd–Peebles Stadium; Mobile, AL (Gulf Coast Classic)	L 2–21		
October 6	at Jackson State	Mississippi Veterans Memorial Stadium; Jackson, MS	L 20–32		
October 13	Prairie View A&M	Cramton Bowl; Montgomery, AL	L 6–17		
October 27	vs. Alabama A&M	Legion Field; Birmingham, AL (Magic City Classic)	L 9–13	68,593	
November 3	No. 18 Grambling State	Cramton Bowl; Montgomery, AL	L 7–21	9,579	
November 10	at Mississippi Valley State	Rice–Totten Stadium; Itta Bena, MS	W 20–16		
November 22	Tuskegee*	Cramton Bowl; Montgomery, AL (Turkey Day Classic)	L 58–64 ^{3OT}		
*Non-conference game; Rankings from The Sports Network Poll released prior to the game
