= 2007 Howard Bison football team =

American college football season

2007 Howard Bison football
- Conference: Mid-Eastern Athletic Conference
- Record: 4–7 (3–6 MEAC)
- Head coach: Carey Bailey (1st season)
- Home stadium: William H. Greene Stadium

2007 Mid-Eastern Athletic Conference football standings
	Conf.			Overall
Team	W		L	W		L
No. 15 Delaware State $^	9	–	0	10	–	2
Norfolk State	7	–	2	8	–	3
South Carolina State	7	–	2	7	–	4
Hampton	5	–	4	6	–	5
Winston-Salem State	5	–	4	6	–	5
Morgan State	4	–	5	5	–	6
Bethune–Cookman	3	–	6	5	–	6
Howard	3	–	6	4	–	7
Florida A&M	2	–	7	3	–	8
North Carolina A&T	0	–	9	0	–	11
$ – Conference champion; ^ – FCS playoff participant; Rankings from The Sports Network poll

The 2007 Howard Bison football team represented Howard University as a member of the Mid-Eastern Athletic Conference (MEAC) during the 2007 NCAA Division I FCS football season. Led by first-year head coach Carey Bailey, the Bison compiled an overall record of 4–7, with a conference record of 3–6, and finished tied for seventh in the MEAC.

== Schedule ==
Date	Opponent	Site	Result	Attendance	Source
September 8	No. 15 Hampton	William H. Greene Stadium; Washington, DC (rivalry)	L 24–31		
September 15	at Florida A&M	Bragg Memorial Stadium; Tallahassee, FL	L 17–30	10,175	
September 22	at Eastern Michigan*	Rynearson Stadium; Ypsilanti, MI	L 15–38	10,141	
September 29	Winston-Salem State	William H. Greene Stadium; Washington, DC	W 24–21 ^{OT}	3,302	
October 6	Cheyney*	William H. Greene Stadium; Washington, DC	W 41–14		
October 13	at Morgan State	Hughes Stadium; Baltimore, MD (rivalry)	L 33–36 ^{OT}	14,987	
October 20	North Carolina A&T	William H. Greene Stadium; Washington, DC	W 35–27	7,035	
October 27	at Norfolk State	William "Dick" Price Stadium; Norfolk, VA	W 17–10	15,548	
November 3	South Carolina State	William H. Greene Stadium; Washington, DC	L 21–59		
November 10	Bethune–Cookman	William H. Greene Stadium; Washington, DC	L 26–37		
November 17	at No. 10 Delaware State	Alumni Stadium; Dover, DE	L 13–29	1,985	
*Non-conference game; Rankings from The Sports Network Poll released prior to the game
