= 2007 Southern Jaguars football team =

American college football season

2007 Southern Jaguars football
- Conference: Southwestern Athletic Conference
- West Division
- Record: 8–3 (6–3 SWAC)
- Head coach: Pete Richardson (15th season)
- Defensive coordinator: Terrence Graves (4th season)
- Home stadium: A. W. Mumford Stadium

2007 Southwestern Athletic Conference football standings
	Conf.			Overall
Team	W		L	W		L
East Division
Jackson State xy$	7	–	2	8	–	4
Alabama A&M	6	–	3	3	–	3
Alabama State	4	–	5	5	–	6
Mississippi Valley State	2	–	7	3	–	8
Alcorn State	2	–	7	2	–	8
West Division
No. 25 Grambling State xy	8	–	1	8	–	4
Southern	6	–	3	8	–	3
Prairie View A&M	6	–	3	7	–	3
Arkansas–Pine Bluff	4	–	5	4	–	7
Texas Southern	0	–	9	0	–	11
Championship: Jackson State 42, Grambling State 31
$ – Conference champion; x – Division champion/co-champions; y – Championship game participant; Rankings from The Sports Network Poll

The 2007 Southern Jaguars football team represented Southern University as a member of the Southwestern Athletic Conference (SWAC) during the 2007 NCAA Division I FCS football season. Led by 15th-year head coach Pete Richardson, the Jaguars compiled an overall record of 8–3, with a conference record of 6–3, and finished and finished second in the SWAC West Division.

== Schedule ==
Date	Opponent	Site	Result	Attendance	Source
September 1	vs. Florida A&M*	Legion Field; Birmingham, AL (MEAC/SWAC Challenge)	W 33–27	30,106	
September 8	vs. Mississippi Valley State	Soldier Field; Chicago, IL (Chicago Football Classic)	W 23–6	49,872	
September 15	Prairie View A&M	A. W. Mumford Stadium; Baton Rouge, LA	W 12–2		
September 22	Tennessee State*	A. W. Mumford Stadium; Baton Rouge, LA	W 41–34	15,371	
September 29	vs. Alabama State	Ladd–Peebles Stadium; Mobile, AL (Gulf Coast Classic)	W 21–2		
October 6	Alabama A&M	A. W. Mumford Stadium; Baton Rouge, LA	L 28–33		
October 13	Jackson State	A. W. Mumford Stadium; Baton Rouge, LA (rivalry)	L 26–32	24,600	
October 20	Alcorn State	A. W. Mumford Stadium; Baton Rouge, LA	W 14–10		
November 3	at Texas Southern	Reliant Stadium; Houston, TX	W 56–7		
November 10	at Arkansas–Pine Bluff	Golden Lion Stadium; Pine Bluff, AR	L 21–23		
November 24	vs. No. 16 Grambling State	Louisiana Superdome; New Orleans, LA (Bayou Classic)	W 22–13	53,297	
*Non-conference game; Rankings from The Sports Network Poll released prior to the game
