= Cedric Pearl =

American football coach (born c. 1969)

Current position
- Title: Head coach
- Team: Allen
- Conference: SIAC
- Record: 8–13

Biographical details
- Born: c. 1969 (age 56–57); Selma, Alabama, U.S.
- Education: Tuskegee University (1992, 1995)

Playing career
- 1988–1991: Tuskegee
- Position: Offensive lineman

Coaching career (HC unless noted)
- 1993: Tuskegee (GA)
- 1994–1995: Tuskegee (OL)
- 1996–2000: Morris Brown (DL)
- 2001: Morehouse (OL)
- 2002–2006: Alabama A&M (OL)
- 2005: New York Jets (intern)
- 2006: Oakland Raiders (intern)
- 2007–2013: Alabama A&M (OC)
- 2014–2019: Central State (OH)
- 2020–2021: Miles (OC/OL)
- 2022–2023: Alabama A&M (DL)
- 2024–present: Allen

Head coaching record
- Overall: 27–54

Accomplishments and honors

Awards
- First Team All-SIAC (1991); Second Team All-SIAC (1990)

Cedric E. Pearl (born c. 1969) is an American football coach. He is the head football coach for Allen University, a position he has held since 2024. He was the head football coach for Central State University from 2014 to 2019. He also coached for Tuskegee, Morris Brown, Morehouse, Alabama A&M, Miles, and for the New York Jets and Oakland Raiders of the National Football League (NFL). He played college football for Tuskegee as an offensive lineman.

== Head coaching record ==
Year	Team	Overall	Conference	Standing	Bowl/playoffs
Central State Marauders (Southern Intercollegiate Athletic Conference) (2014–2019)
2014	Central State	4–6	3–4	4th (West)	
2015	Central State	5–5	2–3	T–3rd (West)	
2016	Central State	1–9	1–3	T–4th (West)	
2017	Central State	1–9	0–6	5th (West)	
2018	Central State	5–5	3–3	T–2nd (West)	
2019	Central State	3–7	2–4	T–4th (West)	
Central State:		19–41	11–23		
Allen Yellow Jackets (Southern Intercollegiate Athletic Conference) (2024–present)
2024	Allen	2–8	1–7	T–11th	
2025	Allen	6–5	5–3	4th	
2026	Allen	0–0	0–0		
Allen:		8–13	6–10		
Total:		27–54			
