= DeChon Burns =

American football player and coach (born 1970)

DeChon Burns (born June 6, 1970, in Riverside, California) is the football head coach at Linfield Christian School.

== Playing career ==
Burns was a four sport letterman at Rubidoux High School, Riverside, California.

Burns attended the University of Southern California as a student-athlete, where he played cornerback. He played in 1989 for a team that went to the Rose Bowl Game, but suffered a neck injury that ended his football career; he served as an assistant to the coaching staff for the 1990-92 seasons.

Burns shifted to baseball and played center field for USC in 1992. He graduated with a bachelor of arts in communications in 1993 and was in the Houston Astros' Developmental League in 1994.

== Coaching career ==
Burns was formerly the defensive line coach at UTEP, the defensive line coach and Defensive Coordinator at Texas Southern. Prior to that, Burns coached for the National Football League Washington Redskins, the Florida Gators, at Linfield Christian High School, Bishop Amat High School and at Beverly Hills High School.

== Media ==
Coach Burns talked about his football playing and coaching career in a 2009 interview on OTTObox.
