= 2007 Penn Quakers football team =

American college football season

2007 Penn Quakers football
- Conference: Ivy League
- Record: 4–6 (3–4 Ivy)
- Head coach: Al Bagnoli (16th season)
- Defensive coordinator: Ray Priore (10th season)
- Home stadium: Franklin Field

2007 Ivy League football standings
| | Conf. | | | Overall |
| Team | W | | L | W | | L |
|---|---|---|---|---|---|---|
| No. 21 Harvard $ | 7 | – | 0 | 8 | – | 2 |
| No. 22 Yale | 6 | – | 1 | 9 | – | 1 |
| Brown | 4 | – | 3 | 5 | – | 5 |
| Penn | 3 | – | 4 | 4 | – | 6 |
| Princeton | 3 | – | 4 | 4 | – | 6 |
| Dartmouth | 3 | – | 4 | 3 | – | 7 |
| Cornell | 2 | – | 5 | 5 | – | 5 |
| Columbia | 0 | – | 7 | 1 | – | 9 |
$ – Conference champion; Rankings from The Sports Network poll

The 2007 Penn Quakers football team represented the University of Pennsylvania in the 2007 NCAA Division I FCS football season. It was the 131st season of play for the Quakers. The team was led by Al Bagnoli, in his 16th season as head coach. The Quakers played their home games at historic Franklin Field in Philadelphia. Penn averaged 11,089 fans per game.

== Schedule ==
| Date | Time | Opponent | Site | TV | Result | Attendance | Source |
|---|---|---|---|---|---|---|---|
| September 15 | 6:00 pm | No. 25 Lafayette* | Franklin Field; Philadelphia, PA | WBPH | L 7–8 | 12,162 | |
| September 22 | 6:00 pm | at Villanova* | Villanova Stadium; Villanova, PA | Comcast | L 14–34 | 8,721 | |
| September 29 | 12:30 pm | at Dartmouth | Memorial Field; Hanover, NH | | L 13–21 | 5,929 | |
| October 6 | 1:00 pm | Georgetown* | Franklin Field; Philadelphia, PA | | W 42–13 | 8,383 | |
| October 13 | 1:30 pm | at Columbia | Robert K. Kraft Field at Lawrence A. Wien Stadium; New York, NY | Comcast | W 59–28 | 8,963 | |
| October 20 | Noon | No. 16 Yale^{†} | Franklin Field; Philadelphia, PA | YES | L 20–26 ^{3OT} | 15,668 | |
| October 27 | 12:30 pm | at Brown | Brown Stadium; Providence, RI | | L 17–31 | 5,127 | |
| November 3 | Noon | Princeton | Franklin Field; Philadelphia, PA (rivalry) | Comcast | W 7–0 | 12,397 | |
| November 10 | 12:30 pm | at Harvard | Harvard Stadium; Boston, MA (rivalry) | | L 7–23 | 10,116 | |
| November 17 | 1:00 pm | Cornell | Franklin Field; Philadelphia, PA (rivalry) | | W 45–9 | 6,838 | |
*Non-conference game; ^{†}Homecoming; Rankings from The Sports Network Poll released prior to the game; All times are in Eastern time
