= 2007 Princeton Tigers football team =

American college football season

2007 Princeton Tigers football
- Conference: Ivy League
- Record: 4–6 (3–4 Ivy)
- Head coach: Roger Hughes (8th season)
- Captains: Brendan Circle; Jon Stern
- Home stadium: Powers Field at Princeton Stadium

2007 Ivy League football standings
	Conf.			Overall
Team	W		L	W		L
No. 21 Harvard $	7	–	0	8	–	2
No. 22 Yale	6	–	1	9	–	1
Brown	4	–	3	5	–	5
Penn	3	–	4	4	–	6
Princeton	3	–	4	4	–	6
Dartmouth	3	–	4	3	–	7
Cornell	2	–	5	5	–	5
Columbia	0	–	7	1	–	9
$ – Conference champion; Rankings from The Sports Network poll

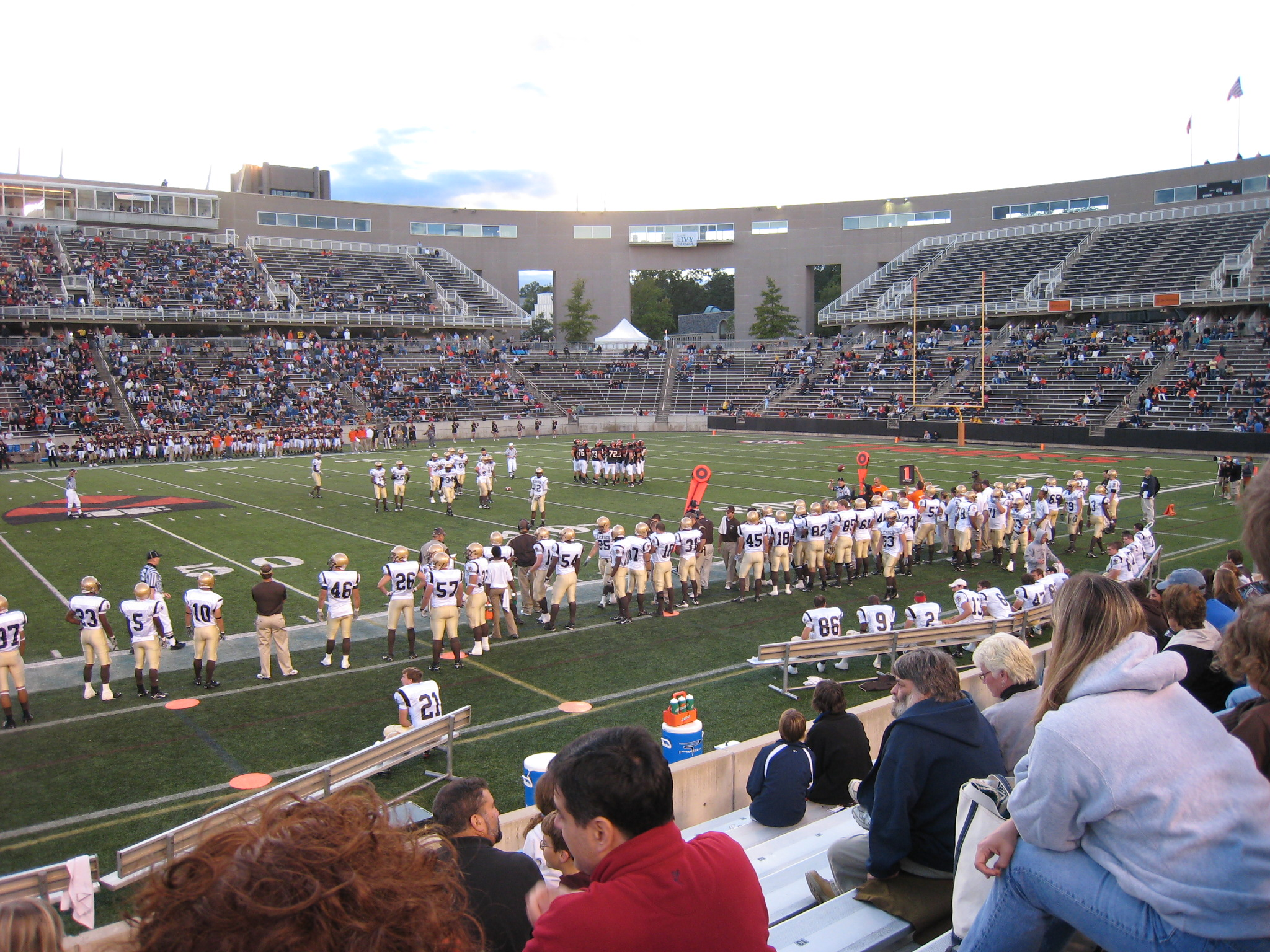
Lehigh Mountain Hawks at Princeton, 15 September 2007

The 2007 Princeton Tigers football team was an American football team that represented Princeton University during the 2007 NCAA Division I FCS football season. Princeton tied for fourth in the Ivy League. Princeton averaged 10,215 fans per game.

In their eighth year under head coach Roger Hughes, the Tigers compiled a 4–6 record, though they were outscored 264 to 201. Brendan Circle and Jon Stern were the team captains.

Princeton's 3–4 conference record tied with Dartmouth and Penn for fourth in the Ivy League standings. The Tigers were outscored 171 to 133 by Ivy opponents.

On Nov. 10, The Tigers dedicated their playing field to alumnus William C. Powers after he donated $10 million to the University and renamed played their playing field Powers Field at Princeton Stadium, on the university campus in Princeton, New Jersey.

== Schedule ==
Date	Opponent	Site	Result	Attendance	Source
September 15	Lehigh*	Princeton Stadium; Princeton, NJ	L 21–32	8,640	
September 22	at No. 22 Lafayette*	Fisher Stadium; Easton, PA	W 20–14	8,921	
September 29	Columbia	Princeton Stadium; Princeton, NJ	W 42–32	7,926	
October 6	Hampton*	Princeton Stadium; Princeton, NJ	L 27–48	15,329	
October 13	at Brown	Brown Stadium; Providence, RI	L 24–33	6,493	
October 20	at Harvard	Harvard Stadium; Boston, MA (rivalry)	L 10–27	12,005	
October 26	Cornell	Princeton Stadium; Princeton, NJ	W 34–31	5,773	
November 3	at Penn	Franklin Field; Philadelphia, PA (rivalry)	L 0–7	12,397	
November 10	No. 12 Yale	Powers Field at Princeton Stadium; Princeton, NJ (rivalry)	L 6–27	13,408	
November 17	at Dartmouth	Memorial Field; Hanover, NH	W 17–14 ^{OT}	4,017	
*Non-conference game; Rankings from The Sports Network Poll released prior to the game
