= 2007 Brown Bears football team =

American college football season

2007 Brown Bears football
- Conference: Ivy League
- Record: 5–5 (4–3 Ivy)
- Head coach: Phil Estes (10th season)
- Offensive coordinator: Frank Sheehan (2nd season)
- Offensive scheme: Pro-style
- Defensive coordinator: Michael Kelleher (7th season)
- Base defense: 4–3
- Captains: Eric Brewer; Dereck Knight; A. J. Tracey
- Home stadium: Brown Stadium

2007 Ivy League football standings
	Conf.			Overall
Team	W		L	W		L
No. 21 Harvard $	7	–	0	8	–	2
No. 22 Yale	6	–	1	9	–	1
Brown	4	–	3	5	–	5
Penn	3	–	4	4	–	6
Princeton	3	–	4	4	–	6
Dartmouth	3	–	4	3	–	7
Cornell	2	–	5	5	–	5
Columbia	0	–	7	1	–	9
$ – Conference champion; Rankings from The Sports Network poll

The 2007 Brown Bears football team was an American football team that represented Brown University during the 2007 NCAA Division I FCS football season. Brown finished third in the Ivy League. Brown averaged 5,138 fans per game.

In their 10th season under head coach Phil Estes, the Bears compiled a 5–5 record and outscored opponents 312 to 291. Eric Brewer, Dereck Knight and A. J. Tracey were the team captains.

The Bears' 4–3 conference record placed third in the Ivy League standings. They outscored Ivy opponents 205 to 177.

Brown played its home games at Brown Stadium in Providence, Rhode Island.

== Schedule ==
Date	Opponent	Site	Result	Attendance	Source
September 15	Duquesne*	Brown Stadium; Providence, RI	W 28–17	3,135	
September 22	at Harvard	Harvard Stadium; Boston, MA	L 17–24	18,898	
September 29	Rhode Island*	Brown Stadium; Providence, RI (rivalry)	L 42–49 ^{2OT}	6,153	
October 6	Holy Cross*	Brown Stadium; Providence, RI	L 37–48	4,805	
October 13	Princeton	Brown Stadium; Providence, RI	W 33–24	6,493	
October 20	at Cornell	Schoellkopf Field; Ithaca, NY	L 31–38 ^{OT}	7,345	
October 27	Penn	Brown Stadium; Providence, RI	W 31–17	5,127	
November 3	at No. 15 Yale	Yale Bowl; New Haven, CT	L 7–17	3,000	
November 10	Dartmouth	Brown Stadium; Providence, RI	W 56–35	5,119	
November 17	at Columbia	Robert K. Kraft Field at Lawrence A. Wien Stadium; New York, NY	W 30–22	3,976	
*Non-conference game; Rankings from The Sports Network Poll released prior to the game
