= Thunder into Our Hearts =

1976 album by Jabula

Thunder Into Our Hearts

Studio album by Jabula
- Released: 1976
- Studios: Chalk Farm Studios, Decibel Studios
- Genres: Jazz, funk, soul
- Label: Caroline Records
- Producer: Roy Bedeau

Jabula chronology
| Jabula (1975) | Thunder Into Our Hearts (1976) | Afrika Awake (1978) |

Thunder into Our Hearts is the second album of South African group Jabula, released in 1976 on Caroline Records.

Recorded in November and December 1975 at Chalk Farm Studios and Decibel Studios in London, the album marks a further exploration of African-tinged jazz.

The album features the group and guest musicians: Frank Roberts (keyboards), Nick Evans (trombone), "Spartacus" (electric bass), Graeme Morgan (drums), Bob House (clarinet), Ken Ely, Jim Dvorak (trumpet), Mike Rose (flute).

== Track listing ==
Side A
| No. | Title | Length |
|---|---|---|
| 1. | "Thunder Into Our Hearts" | 6:59 |
| 2. | "Soweto My Love" | 5:15 |
| 3. | "Ithumeleng Ba Mamelodi" | 6:29 |

Side B
| No. | Title | Length |
|---|---|---|
| 1. | "Tears Of Afrika" | 4:47 |
| 2. | "Baleka - Run Away" | 4:49 |
| 3. | "Journey To Afrika" | 5:29 |
| 4. | "Harvest Part II" | 3:40 |

== Personnel ==
- Acoustic Bass – Ernest Mothle
- Alto Saxophone – Dudu Pukwana
- Backing Vocals – Jim Chambers (tracks: A1, B2, B4), Jimmy Thomas (tracks: A1, B2, B4)
- Clarinet, Alto Saxophone – Bob Howse
- Drums – Graeme Morgan
- Drums [Molombo], Voice, Percussion, Liner Notes – Sebothane Julian Bahula
- Electric Bass – Spartacus R
- Engineer – Rod Howison, Vic Keary
- Flute – Mike Rose (tracks: B4)
- Guitar, Voice, Percussion – Madumetja Lucky Ranku
- Keyboards – Frank Roberts
- Photography by [Jabula] – Herbie Yoshinori Yamaguchi
- Producer – Roy Bedeau
- Sleeve – Cooke Key Associates
- Soprano Saxophone, Tenor Saxophone – Ken Eley
- Trombone – Nick Evans
- Trumpet – Jim Dvorak
- Voice – John Matshikiza (tracks: B1)
