= 2007 Dartmouth Big Green football team =

American college football season

2007 Dartmouth Big Green football
- Conference: Ivy League
- Record: 3–7 (3–4 Ivy)
- Head coach: Buddy Teevens (8th season)
- Captains: Jared Dowdakin; Justin Cottrell; Taylor Layman; Ian Wilson
- Home stadium: Memorial Field

2007 Ivy League football standings
	Conf.			Overall
Team	W		L	W		L
No. 21 Harvard $	7	–	0	8	–	2
No. 22 Yale	6	–	1	9	–	1
Brown	4	–	3	5	–	5
Penn	3	–	4	4	–	6
Princeton	3	–	4	4	–	6
Dartmouth	3	–	4	3	–	7
Cornell	2	–	5	5	–	5
Columbia	0	–	7	1	–	9
$ – Conference champion; Rankings from The Sports Network poll

The 2007 Dartmouth Big Green football team was an American football team that represented Dartmouth College during the 2007 NCAA Division I FCS football season. Dartmouth tied for fourth in the Ivy League. Dartmouth averaged 5,497 fans per game.

In their third consecutive year under head coach Eugene "Buddy" Teevens, his eighth year overall, the Big Green compiled a 3–7 record and were outscored 347 to 271. Jared Dowdakin, Justin Cottrell, Taylor Layman and Ian Wilson were the team captains.

The Big Green's 3–4 conference record tied with Penn and Princeton for fourth in the Ivy League standings. Dartmouth was outscored 223 to 197 by Ivy opponents.

Dartmouth played its home games at Memorial Field on the college campus in Hanover, New Hampshire.

== Schedule ==
Date	Time	Opponent	Site	TV	Result	Attendance	Source
September 15		Colgate*	Memorial Field; Hanover, NH		L 28–31 ^{OT}	5,115	
September 22	12:00 p.m.	at No. 10 New Hampshire*	Cowell Stadium; Durham, NH (rivalry)	WMUR	L 31–52	9,560	
September 29		Penn	Memorial Field; Hanover, NH		W 21–13	5,929	
October 6		at No. 18 Yale	Yale Bowl; New Haven, CT		L 10–50	24,237	
October 13		at Holy Cross*	Fitton Field; Worcester, MA		L 15–41	5,607	
October 20		Columbia^{†}	Memorial Field; Hanover, NH		W 37–28	8,720	
October 27		at Harvard	Harvard Stadium; Boston, MA (rivalry)		L 21–28	11,005	
November 3		Cornell	Memorial Field; Hanover, NH (rivalry)		W 59–31	3,711	
November 10		at Brown	Brown Stadium; Providence, RI		L 35–56	5,119	
November 17		Princeton	Memorial Field; Hanover, NH		L 14–17 ^{OT}	4,017	
*Non-conference game; ^{†}Homecoming; Rankings from The Sports Network Poll released prior to the game; All times are in Eastern time
