= 2007 Lafayette Leopards football team =

American college football season

2007 Lafayette Leopards football
- Conference: Patriot League
- Record: 7–4 (4–2 Patriot)
- Head coach: Frank Tavani (8th season)
- Offensive coordinator: Mike Faragalli (8th season)
- Offensive scheme: Multiple
- Defensive coordinator: John Loose (8th season)
- Base defense: 4–3
- Home stadium: Fisher Stadium

2007 Patriot League football standings
	Conf.			Overall
Team	W		L	W		L
No. 20 Fordham $^	5	–	1	8	–	4
Colgate	4	–	2	7	–	4
Holy Cross	4	–	2	7	–	4
Lafayette	4	–	2	7	–	4
Lehigh	2	–	4	5	–	6
Bucknell	1	–	5	3	–	8
Georgetown	1	–	5	1	–	10
$ – Conference champion; ^ – FCS playoff participant; Rankings from The Sports Network poll

The 2007 Lafayette Leopards football team represented Lafayette College as member of the Patriot League during the 2007 NCAA Division I FCS football season. Led by eighth-year head coach Frank Tavani, the Leopards compiled an overall record of 7–4 with a mark of 4–2 in conference play, placing in a three-way tie for second in the Patriot League. Lafayette played home games at Fisher Field in Easton, Pennsylvania.

All games were televised on the Lafayette Sports Network (LSN).

== Schedule ==
Date	Time	Opponent	Rank	Site	TV	Result	Attendance	Source
September 1	6:00 pm	at Marist*		Fisher Stadium; Easton, PA	LSN	W 49–10	8,452	
September 8	6:00 pm	at Georgetown		Multi-Sport Field; Washington, DC	LSN	W 28–7	2,131	
September 15	6:00 pm	at Penn*	No. 25	Franklin Field; Philadelphia, PA	LSN	W 8–7	12,162	
September 22	6:00 pm	Princeton*	No. 22	Fisher Stadium; Easton, PA	LSN	L 14–20	8,921	
October 6	6:00 pm	Columbia*		Fisher Stadium; Easton, PA	LSN	W 29–0	7,492	
October 13	12:00 pm	at Harvard*		Harvard Stadium; Boston, MA	LSN	L 17–37	10,001	
October 20	1:00 pm	Fordham^{†}		Fisher Stadium; Easton, PA	LSN	L 23–34	8,312	
October 27	1:00 pm	Colgate		Fisher Stadium; Easton, PA	LSN	L 27–36	4,308	
November 3	1:00 pm	Bucknell		Fisher Stadium; Easton, PA	LSN	W 34–7	4,367	
November 10	12:30 pm	at Holy Cross		Fitton Field; Worcester, MA	LSN	W 31–21	4,487	
November 17	12:30 pm	at Lehigh		Goodman Stadium; Bethlehem, PA (The Rivalry)	LSN	W 21–17	16,022	
*Non-conference game; ^{†}Homecoming; Rankings from The Sports Network Poll released prior to the game; All times are in Eastern time
