= 2007 Cornell Big Red football team =

American college football season

2007 Cornell Big Red football
- Conference: Ivy League
- Record: 5–5 (2–5 Ivy)
- Head coach: Jim Knowles (4th season)
- Offensive coordinator: Bruce Barnum (1st season)
- Offensive scheme: Pistol
- Defensive coordinator: Clayton Carlin (1st season)
- Base defense: 4–3
- Captains: Brian McGuire; Colin Nash
- Home stadium: Schoellkopf Field

2007 Ivy League football standings
| | Conf. | | | Overall |
| Team | W | | L | W | | L |
|---|---|---|---|---|---|---|
| No. 21 Harvard $ | 7 | – | 0 | 8 | – | 2 |
| No. 22 Yale | 6 | – | 1 | 9 | – | 1 |
| Brown | 4 | – | 3 | 5 | – | 5 |
| Penn | 3 | – | 4 | 4 | – | 6 |
| Princeton | 3 | – | 4 | 4 | – | 6 |
| Dartmouth | 3 | – | 4 | 3 | – | 7 |
| Cornell | 2 | – | 5 | 5 | – | 5 |
| Columbia | 0 | – | 7 | 1 | – | 9 |
$ – Conference champion; Rankings from The Sports Network poll

The 2007 Cornell Big Red football team represented Cornell University in the 2007 NCAA Division I FCS football season as member of the Ivy League. They were led by fourth-year head coach Jim Knowles and played their home games at Schoellkopf Field in Ithaca, New York. Cornell finished the season 5–5 overall and 2–5 in Ivy League play. Cornell averaged 10,871 fans per game.

== Schedule ==
| Date | Time | Opponent | Site | TV | Result | Attendance | Source |
|---|---|---|---|---|---|---|---|
| September 15 | 7:00 p.m. | Bucknell* | Schoellkopf Field; Ithaca, NY | | W 38–14 | 10,118 | |
| September 22 | 12:30 p.m. | No. 21 Yale | Yale Bowl; New Haven, CT | | L 12–51 | 15,427 | |
| September 29 | 2:00 p.m. | at Georgetown* | Multi-Sport Field; Washington, DC | | W 45–7 | 3,184 | |
| October 6 | 1:00 p.m. | Harvard | Schoellkopf Field; Ithaca, NY | | L 15–32 | 10,619 | |
| October 13 | 1:00 p.m. | Colgate* | Schoellkopf Field; Ithaca, NY (rivalry) | TWC | W 17–14 | 12,035 | |
| October 20 | 1:00 p.m. | Brown | Schoellkopf Field; Ithaca, NY | | W 38–31 | 7,345 | |
| October 26 | 7:00 p.m. | at Princeton | Princeton Stadium; Princeton, NJ | ESPNU | L 31–34 | 5,773 | |
| November 3 | 12:00 p.m. | at Dartmouth | Memorial Field; Hanover, NH (rivalry) | | L 31–59 | 3,711 | |
| November 10 | 1:00 p.m. | Columbia | Schoellkopf Field; Ithaca, NY (rivalry) | | W 34–14 | 3,369 | |
| November 17 | 1:00 p.m. | at Penn | Franklin Field; Philadelphia, PA (rivalry) | | L 9–45 | 6,838 | |
*Non-conference game; Rankings from The Sports Network Poll released prior to the game; All times are in Eastern time
