= 2007 Holy Cross Crusaders football team =

American college football season

2007 Holy Cross Crusaders football
- Conference: Patriot League
- Record: 7–4 (4–2 Patriot)
- Head coach: Tom Gilmore (4th season)
- Offensive coordinator: Chris Pincince (4th season)
- Defensive coordinator: Richard Rodgers Sr. (2nd season)
- Captains: Casey Gough; Obi Green; Dominic Randolph
- Home stadium: Fitton Field

2007 Patriot League football standings
	Conf.			Overall
Team	W		L	W		L
No. 20 Fordham $^	5	–	1	8	–	4
Colgate	4	–	2	7	–	4
Holy Cross	4	–	2	7	–	4
Lafayette	4	–	2	7	–	4
Lehigh	2	–	4	5	–	6
Bucknell	1	–	5	3	–	8
Georgetown	1	–	5	1	–	10
$ – Conference champion; ^ – FCS playoff participant; Rankings from The Sports Network poll

The 2007 Holy Cross Crusaders football team was an American football team that represented the College of the Holy Cross during the 2007 NCAA Division I FCS football season. Holy Cross tied for second in the Patriot League.

In their fourth year under head coach Tom Gilmore, the Crusaders compiled a 7–4 record. Casey Gough, Obi Green and Dominic Randolph were the team captains.

The Crusaders outscored opponents 395 to 264. Holy Cross' 4–2 conference record tied with Colgate and Lafayette for second place out of seven in the Patriot League standings.

Holy Cross played its home games at Fitton Field on the college campus in Worcester, Massachusetts.

== Schedule ==
Date	Opponent	Site	Result	Attendance	Source
September 1	at No. 3 UMass*	McGuirk Stadium; Hadley, MA	L 30–40	12,254	
September 15	Harvard^{†}*	Fitton Field; Worcester, MA	W 31–28	10,942	
September 22	Georgetown	Fitton Field; Worcester, MA	W 55–0	5,982	
September 29	No. 22 Yale^*	Fitton Field; Worcester, MA	L 17–38	11,826	
October 6	at Brown*	Brown Stadium; Providence, RI	W 48–37	4,805	
October 13	Dartmouth*	Fitton Field; Worcester, MA	W 41–15	5,607	
October 20	at Lehigh	Goodman Stadium; Bethlehem, PA	W 59–10	9,103	
October 27	at Bucknell	Christy Mathewson–Memorial Stadium; Lewisburg, PA	W 45–21	5,892	
November 3	at Fordham	Coffey Field; Bronx, NY (rivalry)	L 21–24	8,300	
November 10	Lafayette	Fitton Field; Worcester, MA	L 21–31	4,487	
November 17	Colgate	Fitton Field; Worcester, MA	W 27–20		
*Non-conference game; ^{†}Homecoming; ^ Family Weekend; Rankings from The Sports Network Poll released prior to the game
