= 2007 Colgate Raiders football team =

American college football season

2007 Colgate Raiders football
- Conference: Patriot League
- Record: 7–4 (4–2 Patriot)
- Head coach: Dick Biddle (12th season)
- Captains: Mike Gallihugh; Pat Nolan; Cody Williams
- Home stadium: Andy Kerr Stadium

2007 Patriot League football standings
	Conf.			Overall
Team	W		L	W		L
No. 20 Fordham $^	5	–	1	8	–	4
Colgate	4	–	2	7	–	4
Holy Cross	4	–	2	7	–	4
Lafayette	4	–	2	7	–	4
Lehigh	2	–	4	5	–	6
Bucknell	1	–	5	3	–	8
Georgetown	1	–	5	1	–	10
$ – Conference champion; ^ – FCS playoff participant; Rankings from The Sports Network poll

The 2007 Colgate Raiders football team was an American football team that represented Colgate University during the 2007 NCAA Division I FCS football season. Colgate tied for second in the Patriot League.

In its 12th season under head coach Dick Biddle, the team compiled a 7–4 record. Mike Gallihugh, Pat Nolan and Cody Williams were the team captains.

The Raiders outscored opponents 283 to 239. Colgate's 4–2 conference record tied with Holy Cross and Lafayette for second in the Patriot League standings.

Colgate played its home games at Andy Kerr Stadium in Hamilton, New York.

== Schedule ==
Date	Opponent	Site	Result	Attendance	Source
September 1	Albany*	Andy Kerr Stadium; Hamilton, NY	W 13–11	5,226	
September 8	No. 2 UMass*	Andy Kerr Stadium; Hamilton, NY	L 17–35	3,211	
September 15	at Dartmouth*	Memorial Field; Hanover, NH	W 31–28 ^{OT}	5,115	
September 29	Fordham	Andy Kerr Stadium; Hamilton, NY	L 31–34	3,231	
October 6	Bucknell	Andy Kerr Stadium; Hamilton, NY	W 28–24		
October 13	at Cornell*	Schoellkopf Field; Ithaca, NY (rivalry)	L 14–17	12,035	
October 20	Towson*	Andy Kerr Stadium; Hamilton, NY	W 27–17	5,227	
October 27	at Lafayette	Fisher Stadium; Easton, PA	W 36–27	4,308	
November 3	Lehigh	Andy Kerr Stadium; Hamilton, NY	W 21–7		
November 9	at Georgetown	Multi-Sport Field; Washington, DC	W 45–12		
November 17	at Holy Cross	Fitton Field; Worcester, MA	L 20–27		
*Non-conference game; Rankings from The Sports Network Poll released prior to the game
