= 2007 Fordham Rams football team =

American college football season

2007 Fordham Rams football

Patriot League champion

NCAA Division I First Round, L 35–49 at UMass
- Conference: Patriot League

Ranking
- Sports Network: No. 20
- Record: 8–4 (5–1 Patriot)
- Head coach: Tom Masella (2nd season)
- Defensive coordinator: Frank Forcucci (2nd season)
- Captains: Mike Breznicky; Earl Hudnell; Mike Nardone; Sam Orah; Dominique Owens
- Home stadium: Coffey Field

2007 Patriot League football standings
	Conf.			Overall
Team	W		L	W		L
No. 20 Fordham $^	5	–	1	8	–	4
Colgate	4	–	2	7	–	4
Holy Cross	4	–	2	7	–	4
Lafayette	4	–	2	7	–	4
Lehigh	2	–	4	5	–	6
Bucknell	1	–	5	3	–	8
Georgetown	1	–	5	1	–	10
$ – Conference champion; ^ – FCS playoff participant; Rankings from The Sports Network poll

The 2007 Fordham Rams football team was an American football team that represented Fordham University during the 2007 NCAA Division I FCS football season. Fordham won the Patriot League championship, but lost in the first round of the national FCS playoffs.

In their second year under head coach Tom Masella, the Rams compiled an 8–4 record (8–3 in the regular season). Mike Breznicky, Earl Hudnell, Mike Nardone, Sam Orah and Dominique Owens were the team captains.

The Rams outscored opponents 348 to 298. Their 5–1 conference record was the best in the Patriot League standings.

Fordham was unranked through most of the year, only entering the national top 25 in early November, at No. 22. The Rams were ranked No. 18 for their season-ending matchup with Bucknell, then No. 25 for the playoffs. Their final ranking was No. 20.

Fordham played its home games at Jack Coffey Field on the university's Rose Hill campus in The Bronx, in New York City.

== Schedule ==
Date	Opponent	Site	Result	Attendance	Source
September 1	at Rhode Island*	Meade Stadium; Kingston, RI	W 27–23	2,092	
September 8	Albany*	Coffey Field; Bronx, NY	L 20–23	3,717	
September 15	Columbia*	Coffey Field; Bronx, NY (Liberty Cup)	W 27–10	3,721	
September 22	Dayton^{†}*	Coffey Field; Bronx, NY	L 24–31	4,532	
September 29	at Colgate	Andy Kerr Stadium; Hamilton, NY	W 34–31	3,231	
October 6	Lehigh	Coffey Field; Bronx, NY	W 28–18	3,371	
October 13	at Georgetown	Multi-Sport Field; Washington, DC	W 38–31	2,143	
October 20	at Lafayette	Fisher Stadium; Easton, PA	W 34–23	8,312	
October 27	at Marist*	Leonidoff Field; Poughkeepsie, NY	W 33–0		
November 3	Holy Cross	Coffey Field; Bronx, NY (rivalry)	W 24–21	8,300	
November 17	Bucknell	Coffey Field; Bronx, NY	L 24–38		
November 24	at No. 7 UMass*	McGuirk Stadium; Hadley, MA (NCAA Division I First Round)	L 35–49	5,224	
*Non-conference game; ^{†}Homecoming; Rankings from The Sports Network Poll released prior to the game
