= 2007 Georgetown Hoyas football team =

American college football season

2007 Georgetown Hoyas football
- Conference: Patriot League
- Record: 1–10 (1–5 Patriot)
- Head coach: Kevin Kelly (2nd season)
- Defensive coordinator: Rob Sgarlata (2nd season)
- Captains: Matt Bassuener; Nnamdi Obiako; Stephen Smith; Kyle Van Fleet
- Home stadium: Multi-Sport Field

2007 Patriot League football standings
	Conf.			Overall
Team	W		L	W		L
No. 20 Fordham $^	5	–	1	8	–	4
Colgate	4	–	2	7	–	4
Holy Cross	4	–	2	7	–	4
Lafayette	4	–	2	7	–	4
Lehigh	2	–	4	5	–	6
Bucknell	1	–	5	3	–	8
Georgetown	1	–	5	1	–	10
$ – Conference champion; ^ – FCS playoff participant; Rankings from The Sports Network poll

The 2007 Georgetown Hoyas football team was an American football team that represented Georgetown University during the 2007 NCAA Division I FCS football season. The Hoyas tied for last in the Patriot League.

In their second year under head coach Kevin Kelly, the Hoyas compiled a 1–10 record. Matt Bassuener, Nnamdi Obiako, Stephen Smith and Kyle Van Fleet were the team captains.

The Hoyas were outscored 415 to 166. Georgetown's 1–5 conference record tied with Bucknell for sixth place in the Patriot League standings.

Georgetown played its home games at Multi-Sport Field on the university campus in Washington, D.C.

== Schedule ==
Date	Opponent	Site	Result	Attendance	Source
September 1	at Stony Brook*	Kenneth P. LaValle Stadium; Stony Brook, NY	L 28–35	7,228	
September 8	Lafayette	Multi-Sport Field; Washington, DC	L 7–28		
September 15	No. 21 Yale*	Multi-Sport Field; Washington, DC	L 14–28	2,674	
September 22	at Holy Cross	Fitton Field; Worcester, MA	L 0–55	5,982	
September 29	Cornell*	Multi-Sport Field; Washington, DC	L 7–45	3,184	
October 6	at Penn*	Franklin Field; Philadelphia, PA	L 13–42	8,383	
October 13	at Fordham	Coffey Field; Bronx, NY	L 31–38	2,143	
October 20	at Bucknell	Christy Mathewson–Memorial Stadium; Lewisburg, PA	W 20–17		
October 27	at Lehigh	Goodman Stadium; Bethlehem, PA	L 0–45	9,084	
November 3	at Marist*	Leonidoff Field; Poughkeepsie, NY	L 34–37 ^{OT}		
November 9	Colgate	Multi-Sport Field; Washington, DC	L 12–45		
*Non-conference game; Rankings from The Sports Network Poll released prior to the game
