= Jabula =

Group of South African musicians

Jabula (isiZulu: "rejoice") was a musical ensemble of South African musicians exiled in England during the Apartheid era, led by Julian Bahula.

== Background ==
The four musicians who became Jabula met in London, where they were living after leaving their native South Africa. The group was formed in 1974 and consisted of:

- Julian Bahula – lead vocals (formerly of Philip Tabane's Malombo Jazzmen)
- Ernest Mothle – bass guitar
- Lucky Ranku – guitar and percussion
- Eddie Tatane – percussion

Between 1975 and 1982, Jabula released five albums. In addition to their own albums, the group also performed with Mike Oldfield for his albums Ommadawn (1975), Incantations (1978), and Amarok (1990).

On 21 July 1979, Jabula appeared at the Amandla Festival along with Bob Marley, Dick Gregory, Patti LaBelle and Eddie Palmieri, among others.

Their second album, Thunder into Our Hearts (1976), is dedicated to the trumpeter Mongezi Feza (1945–1975), with whom the group played in the run-up to its recording, but who had died.

== Discography ==
- Jabula (1975)
- Thunder into Our Hearts (1976)
- Jabula in Amsterdam (1978)
- Afrika Awake (1978)
- Jabula With Me (1982)
