= 2007 Harvard Crimson football team =

American college football season

2007 Harvard Crimson football

Ivy League champion
- Conference: Ivy League

Ranking
- Sports Network: No. 21
- Record: 8–2 (7–0 Ivy)
- Head coach: Tim Murphy (14th season)
- Offensive coordinator: Joel Lamb (2nd season)
- Offensive scheme: Spread
- Defensive coordinator: Kevin Doherty (6th season)
- Base defense: 3–4
- Home stadium: Harvard Stadium

2007 Ivy League football standings
	Conf.			Overall
Team	W		L	W		L
No. 21 Harvard $	7	–	0	8	–	2
No. 22 Yale	6	–	1	9	–	1
Brown	4	–	3	5	–	5
Penn	3	–	4	4	–	6
Princeton	3	–	4	4	–	6
Dartmouth	3	–	4	3	–	7
Cornell	2	–	5	5	–	5
Columbia	0	–	7	1	–	9
$ – Conference champion; Rankings from The Sports Network poll

The 2007 Harvard Crimson football team represented Harvard University in the 2007 NCAA Division I FCS football season. Under 14th-year head coach Tim Murphy, the Crimson compiled an 8–2 record and went undefeated in Ivy League play, winning the conference championship. Harvard averaged 12,423 fans per game.

The team was ranked 21 in the final poll standings for the FCS football season.

Harvard played its home games at Harvard Stadium in the Allston neighborhood of Boston, Massachusetts.

== Schedule ==
Date	Opponent	Site	Result	Attendance	Source
September 15	at Holy Cross*	Fitton Field; Worcester, MA	L 31–28	10,942	
September 22	Brown	Harvard Stadium; Boston, MA	W 24-17	18,898	
September 29	at Lehigh*	Goodman Stadium; Bethlehem, PA	L 20–13	9,103	
October 6	at Cornell	Schoellkopf Field; Ithaca, New York	W 32–15	10,619	
October 13	Lafayette*	Harvard Stadium; Boston, MA	W 27-17	10,001	
October 20	Princeton	Harvard Stadium; Boston, MA (rivalry)	W 27–10	12,005	
October 27	Dartmouth	Harvard Stadium; Boston, MA (rivalry)	W 28–21	11,005	
November 3	at Columbia	Robert K. Kraft Field at Lawrence A. Wien Stadium; New York, NY	W 27–12	2,283	
November 10	Penn	Harvard Stadium; Boston, MA (rivalry)	W 23–7	10,116	
November 17	at No. 11 Yale	Yale Bowl; New Haven, CT (The Game)	W 37–6	57,248	
*Non-conference game; Rankings from The Sports Network Poll released prior to the game
