= 2007 Columbia Lions football team =

American college football season

2007 Columbia Lions football
- Conference: Ivy League
- Record: 1–9 (0–7 Ivy)
- Head coach: Norries Wilson (2nd season)
- Offensive coordinator: Vinny Marino (2nd season)
- Captains: Craig Hormann; Drew Quinn; JoJo Smith
- Home stadium: Robert K. Kraft Field at Lawrence A. Wien Stadium

2007 Ivy League football standings
	Conf.			Overall
Team	W		L	W		L
No. 21 Harvard $	7	–	0	8	–	2
No. 22 Yale	6	–	1	9	–	1
Brown	4	–	3	5	–	5
Penn	3	–	4	4	–	6
Princeton	3	–	4	4	–	6
Dartmouth	3	–	4	3	–	7
Cornell	2	–	5	5	–	5
Columbia	0	–	7	1	–	9
$ – Conference champion; Rankings from The Sports Network poll

The 2007 Columbia Lions football team was an American football team that represented Columbia University during the 2007 NCAA Division I FCS football season. Columbia finished last in the Ivy League. Columbia averaged 4,172 fans per game.

In their second season under head coach Norries Wilson, the Lions compiled a 1–9 record and were outscored 283 to 156. Craig Hormann, Drew Quinn and JoJo Smith were the team captains.

The Lions' winless (0–7) conference record placed eighth in the Ivy League standings. Columbia was outscored 257 to 143 by Ivy opponents.

Columbia played its homes games at Robert K. Kraft Field at Lawrence A. Wien Stadium in Upper Manhattan, in New York City. The field at Wien Stadium was dedicated to Robert Kraft, a Columbia graduate and owner of the New England Patriots, during the October 13 homecoming game.

== Schedule ==
Date	Opponent	Site	Result	Attendance	Source
September 15	at Fordham*	Coffey Field; Bronx, NY (Liberty Cup)	L 10–27	3,721	
September 22	Marist*	Wien Stadium; New York, NY	W 31–7	3,083	
September 29	at Princeton	Princeton Stadium; Princeton, NJ	L 32–42		
October 6	at Lafayette*	Fisher Stadium; Easton, PA	L 0–29	7,492	
October 13	Penn^{†}	Robert K. Kraft Field at Lawrence A. Wien Stadium; New York, NY	L 28–59	8,963	
October 20	at Dartmouth	Memorial Field; Hanover, NH	L 28–37	8,720	
October 27	No. 13 Yale	Robert K. Kraft Field at Lawrence A. Wien Stadium; New York, NY	L 7–28	2,555	
November 3	Harvard	Robert K. Kraft Field at Lawrence A. Wien Stadium; New York, NY	L 12–27	2,283	
November 10	at Cornell	Schoellkopf Field; Ithaca, NY (rivalry)	L 14–34	3,369	
November 17	Brown	Robert K. Kraft Field at Lawrence A. Wien Stadium; New York, NY	L 22–30	3,976	
*Non-conference game; ^{†}Homecoming; Rankings from The Sports Network Poll released prior to the game
