= Amandla Festival =

1979 music festival in Boston, Massachusetts

Amandla—Festival of Unity—was a world music festival held at Harvard Stadium in Boston, Massachusetts, on July 21, 1979. The goals of the concert were to support and celebrate the liberation of Southern Africa as well as the ongoing efforts of people in Boston to end racism in their families, schools, workplaces and communities.

The word "Amandla" is from the South-African Zulu language and means "power", "strength" or "energy". The headline performance was reggae superstar Bob Marley and his band The Wailers. Marley made several short speeches during his encore when he powerfully blamed the system and urgently claimed Africa's unity and freedom. Those onstage speeches were unusual for Marley, as he normally was threatened with censorship when speaking openly about the system's failure and marijuana smoking, as he did at the Amandla Festival.

Among the Festival's key organizers were Janet Axelrod, Reebee Garofalo, Janine Fay, Shelley Neill, George Pillsbury and Kazi Toure.

Other performers were soul legend Patti LaBelle, jazz pianist Eddie Palmieri, drummer Babatunde Olatunji, drummer Yaya Diallo, the South African band Jabula, the Art of Black Dance and comedian Dick Gregory who gave a speech before Marley's performance. Mel King, a long-time Boston community activist and outspoken opponent of apartheid, was the emcee.

Bob Marley and the Wailers were the last musical act to be signed. They signed on to perform a mere 3 weeks before the scheduled festival. The performance almost did not happen because Al Anderson broke the neck of his guitar during rehearsal. The band, just minutes before their scheduled performance, refused to go on. One of the festival organizers drove into Harvard Square to "The Instrument Exchange" and purchased a guitar for $600. An interesting note: no municipal police were allowed within the stadium during the festival. The concert organizers had Boston residents trained in crowd security over a period of six months.
