= 2007 Bucknell Bison football team =

American college football season

2007 Bucknell Bison football
- Conference: Patriot League
- Record: 3–8 (1–5 Patriot)
- Head coach: Tim Landis (5th season)
- Offensive coordinator: Ashley Ingram (2nd season)
- Captains: Jonathan Grainger; Ryan Slater
- Home stadium: Christy Mathewson–Memorial Stadium

2007 Patriot League football standings
	Conf.			Overall
Team	W		L	W		L
No. 20 Fordham $^	5	–	1	8	–	4
Colgate	4	–	2	7	–	4
Holy Cross	4	–	2	7	–	4
Lafayette	4	–	2	7	–	4
Lehigh	2	–	4	5	–	6
Bucknell	1	–	5	3	–	8
Georgetown	1	–	5	1	–	10
$ – Conference champion; ^ – FCS playoff participant; Rankings from The Sports Network poll

The 2007 Bucknell Bison football team was an American football team that represented Bucknell University during the 2007 NCAA Division I FCS football season. It tied for last in the Patriot League.

Bucknell played its home games at Christy Mathewson–Memorial Stadium on the university campus in Lewisburg, Pennsylvania.

In its fifth year under head coach Tim Landis, the Bison compiled a 3–8 record. Jonathan Grainger and Ryan Slater were the team captains.

The Bison were outscored 346 to 231. Bucknell's 1–5 conference record tied with Georgetown for sixth the seven-team Patriot League standings.

== Schedule ==
Date	Opponent	Site	Result	Attendance	Source
September 1	at Duquesne*	Rooney Field; Pittsburgh, PA	W 28–19	3,208	
September 8	Stony Brook*	Christy Mathewson–Memorial Stadium; Lewisburg, PA	L 20–48	5,143	
September 15	at Cornell*	Schoellkopf Field; Ithaca, NY	L 14–38	10,118	
September 22	Richmond*	Christy Mathewson–Memorial Stadium; Lewisburg, PA	L 14–45	2,474	
September 29	Marist^{†}*	Christy Mathewson–Memorial Stadium; Lewisburg, PA	W 38–7	2,645	
October 6	at Colgate	Andy Kerr Stadium; Hamilton, NY	L 24–28		
October 20	Georgetown^{†}	Christy Mathewson–Memorial Stadium; Lewisburg, PA	L 17–20		
October 27	Holy Cross^	Christy Mathewson–Memorial Stadium; Lewisburg, PA	L 21–45	5,892	
November 3	at Lafayette	Fisher Stadium; Easton, PA	L 7–34	4,367	
November 10	Lehigh	Christy Mathewson–Memorial Stadium; Lewisburg, PA	L 10–38	1,761	
November 17	at No. 18 Fordham	Coffey Field; Bronx, NY	W 38–24		
*Non-conference game; ^{†}Homecoming; ^ Parents Weekend; Rankings from The Sports Network Poll released prior to the game
