= 2007 Yale Bulldogs football team =

American college football season

2007 Yale Bulldogs football
- Conference: Ivy League

Ranking
- Coaches: No. 21
- Sports Network: No. 22
- Record: 9–1 (6–1 Ivy)
- Head coach: Jack Siedlecki (11th season)
- Home stadium: Yale Bowl

2007 Ivy League football standings
	Conf.			Overall
Team	W		L	W		L
No. 21 Harvard $	7	–	0	8	–	2
No. 22 Yale	6	–	1	9	–	1
Brown	4	–	3	5	–	5
Penn	3	–	4	4	–	6
Princeton	3	–	4	4	–	6
Dartmouth	3	–	4	3	–	7
Cornell	2	–	5	5	–	5
Columbia	0	–	7	1	–	9
$ – Conference champion; Rankings from The Sports Network poll

The 2007 Yale Bulldogs football team represented Yale University in the 2007 NCAA Division I FCS football season. The Bulldogs were led by 11th-year head coach Jack Siedlecki, played their home games at the Yale Bowl and finished in second place in the Ivy League with a 6–1 record, 9–1 overall. Yale averaged 22,792 fans per game.

== Schedule ==
Date	Opponent	Rank	Site	Result	Attendance	Source
September 15	at Georgetown*	No. 21	Multi-Sport Field; Washington, DC	W 28–14	2,674	
September 22	Cornell	No. 21	Yale Bowl; New Haven, CT	W 51–12	15,427	
September 29	at Holy Cross*	No. 22	Fitton Field; Worcester, MA	W 38–17	11,826	
October 6	Dartmouth	No. 18	Yale Bowl; New Haven, CT	W 50–10	24,237	
October 13	Lehigh*	No. 16	Yale Bowl; New Haven, CT	W 23-7	14,052	
October 20	at Penn	No. 16	Franklin Field; Philadelphia, PA	W 26–20 ^{3OT}	15,668	
October 27	at Columbia	No. 13	Robert K. Kraft Field at Lawrence A. Wien Stadium; New York, NY	W 28–7	2,555	
November 3	Brown	No. 15	Yale Bowl; New Haven, CT	W 17–7	3,000	
November 10	at Princeton	No. 12	Princeton Stadium; Princeton, NJ (rivalry)	W 27–6	13,408	
November 17	Harvard	No. 11	Yale Bowl; New Haven, CT (The Game)	L 6–37	57,248	
*Non-conference game; Rankings from The Sports Network Poll released prior to the game
