= 2007 Lehigh Mountain Hawks football team =

American college football season

2007 Lehigh Mountain Hawks football
- Conference: Patriot League
- Record: 5–6 (2–4 Patriot)
- Head coach: Andy Coen (2nd season)
- Offensive coordinator: Trey Brown (2nd season)
- Captains: Ernest Moore; John Reese; Sedale Threatt; Brannan Thomas
- Home stadium: Goodman Stadium

2007 Patriot League football standings
	Conf.			Overall
Team	W		L	W		L
No. 20 Fordham $^	5	–	1	8	–	4
Colgate	4	–	2	7	–	4
Holy Cross	4	–	2	7	–	4
Lafayette	4	–	2	7	–	4
Lehigh	2	–	4	5	–	6
Bucknell	1	–	5	3	–	8
Georgetown	1	–	5	1	–	10
$ – Conference champion; ^ – FCS playoff participant; Rankings from The Sports Network poll

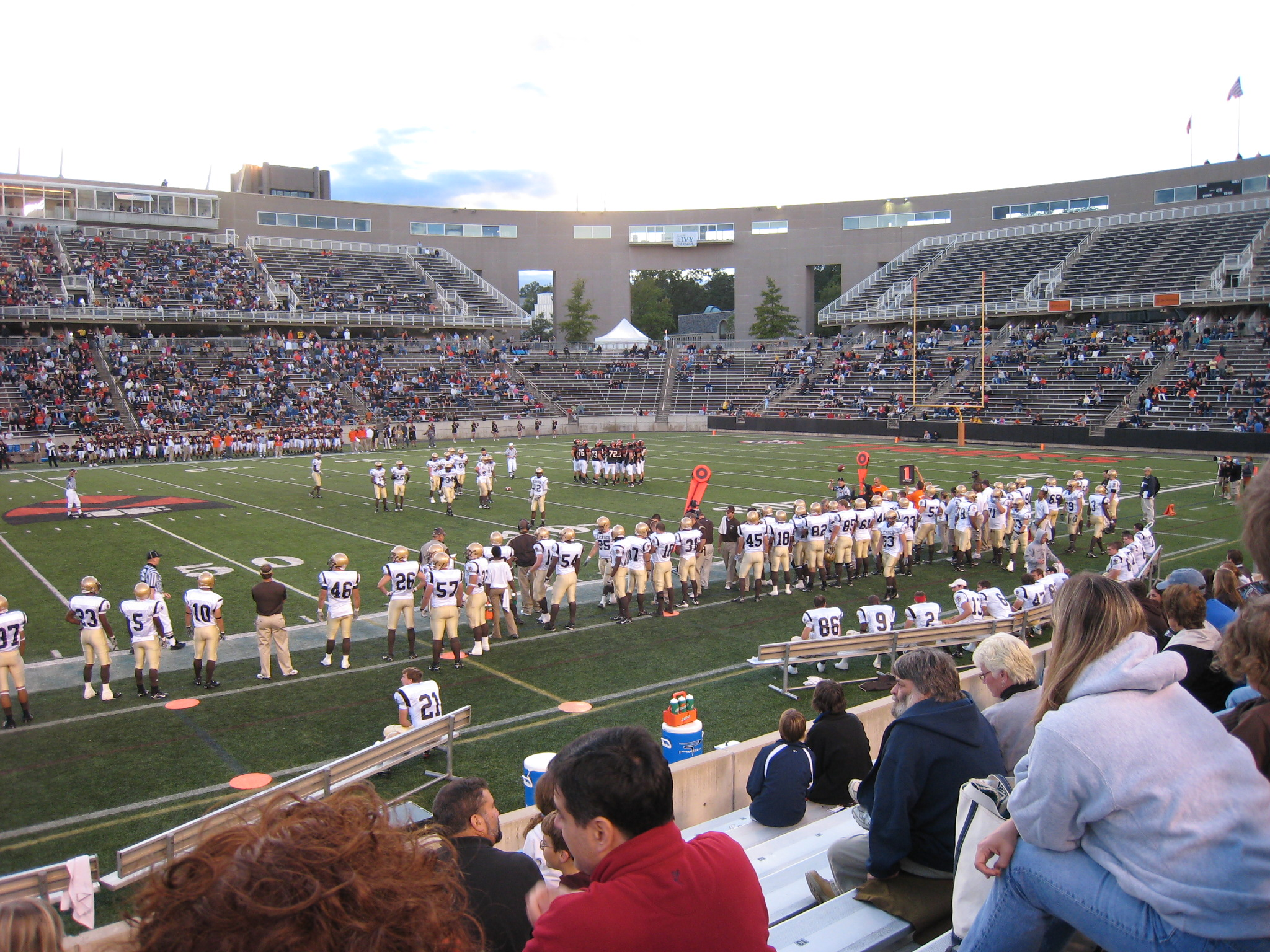
Mountain Hawks at Princeton, 15 September 2007

The 2007 Lehigh Mountain Hawks football team was an American football team that represented Lehigh University during the 2007 NCAA Division I FCS football season. Lehigh finished fifth in the Patriot League.

In their second year under head coach Andy Coen, the Mountain Hawks compiled a 5–6 record. Ernest Moore, John Reese, Sedale Threatt and Brannan Thomas were the team captains.

The Mountain Hawks outscored opponents 251 to 232. Their 2–4 conference record placed fifth out of seven in the Patriot League.

Lehigh played its home games at Goodman Stadium on the university's Goodman Campus in Bethlehem, Pennsylvania.

== Schedule ==
Date	Opponent	Site	Result	Attendance	Source
September 8	Villanova*	Goodman Stadium; Bethlehem, PA	L 20–30	9,261	
September 15	at Princeton*	Princeton Stadium; Princeton, NJ	W 32–24	8,640	
September 22	VMI*	Goodman Stadium; Bethlehem, PA	W 37–6	6,550	
September 29	Harvard*	Goodman Stadium; Bethlehem, PA	W 20–13	9,103	
October 6	at Fordham	Coffey Field; Bronx, NY	L 18–28	3,371	
October 13	at No. 16 Yale*	Yale Bowl; New Haven, CT	L 7–23	14,052	
October 20	Holy Cross	Goodman Stadium; Bethlehem, PA	L 10–59	9,103	
October 27	Georgetown	Goodman Stadium; Bethlehem, PA	W 45–0	9,084	
November 3	at Colgate	Andy Kerr Stadium; Hamilton, NY	L 7–21		
November 10	at Bucknell	Christy Mathewson–Memorial Stadium; Lewisburg, PA	W 38–10	1,761	
November 17	Lafayette	Goodman Stadium; Bethlehem, PA (The Rivalry)	L 17–21	16,022	
*Non-conference game; Rankings from The Sports Network Poll released prior to the game
