= Julian Bahula =

South African drummer, composer and bandleader (1938–2023)

Julian Bahula OIG
- Born: 13 March 1938; Eersterust, Pretoria, South Africa
- Died: 1 October 2023 (aged 85); South Africa
- Occupation(s): Drummer, composer and bandleader
- Spouse(s): Liza Breen (née Carpenter) (m. 1978; died 2016) Pinky Miles (m. 2018)
- Awards: Order of Ikhamanga

Julian Bahula OIG (13 March 1938 – 1 October 2023) was a South African drummer, composer and bandleader, based from 1973 in Britain, where he formed the music ensemble Jabula.

== Biography ==
Sebothane Julian Bahula was born in Eersterust, Pretoria, South Africa. He first gained a reputation as a drummer in the band Malombo. He migrated to England in 1973 and subsequently formed the group Jabula, which in 1977 combined with the group of saxophonist Dudu Pukwana to form Jabula Spear. Another later project for Bahula was the band Jazz Afrika. In the 1980s, Bahula played with Dick Heckstall-Smith's Electric Dream ensemble.

As Eugene Chadbourne of AllMusic has written: "Bahula has been as tireless a promoter of the music of his homeland in his adopted country as he is an on-stage rhythm activator. One of his most important moves was establishing a regular Friday night featuring authentic African bands at the London venue The 100 Club. He booked a lot of musicians who were also political refugees; his series began to symbolize a movement for change. Players such as Fela Kuti, Miriam Makeba, and Hugh Masekela were among the performers whose early British appearances were organized by Bahula."

With the Anti-Apartheid Movement, Bahula organised in 1983 African Sounds, a concert at Alexandra Palace to mark the 65th birthday of Nelson Mandela, with featured artists including Hugh Masekela, Osibisa and Jazz Afrika, drawing a 3,000-strong audience and raising the international profile of Mandela and other political prisoners.

In 2012, President Jacob Zuma presented Bahula with the Order of Ikhamanga (Gold).

Bahula married twice: Liza Breen (née Carpenter) in 1978; after her death in 2016, he married Pinky Miles in 2018. Bahula died on 1 October 2023, at the age of 85.
