= Harvard Stadium =

College football stadium in Boston, Massachusetts

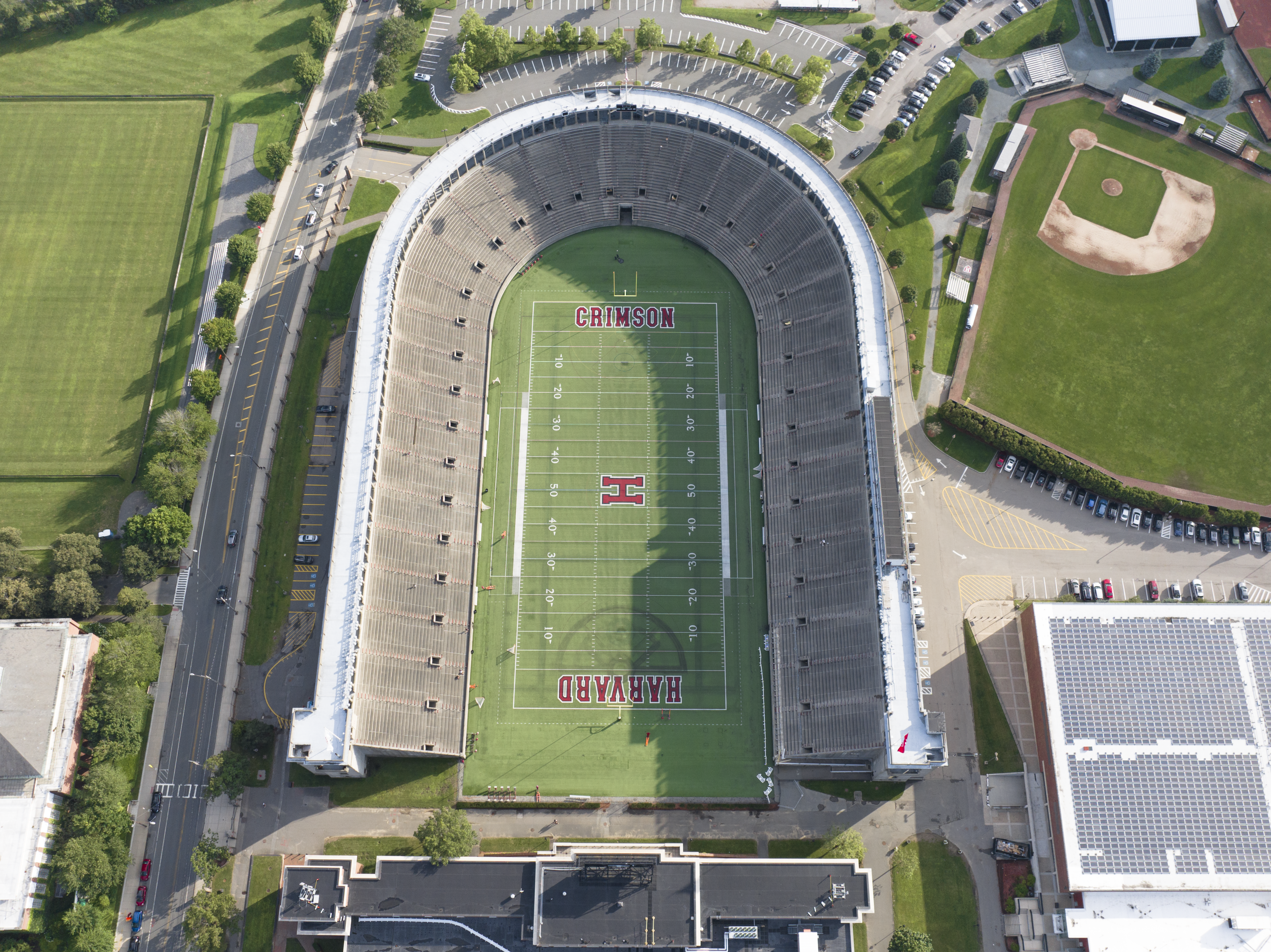
- Aerial view of Harvard Stadium in August 2023
- Interactive map of Harvard Stadium
- Location: 95 N. Harvard Street; Boston, Massachusetts, U.S.
- Owner: Harvard University
- Operator: Harvard University
- Capacity: 25,000 (1952–present) Former capacity: List: 57,166 (1929–1951); 42,000 (1904–1928); 20,000 (1903)
- Surface: FieldTurf (2006–present); Natural grass (1903–2005)

Construction
- Groundbreaking: July 1903
- Opened: November 14, 1903; 123 years ago
- Cost: $310,000 ($11.1 million in 2025)
- Architects: Louis J. Johnson, Class of 1887

Tenants
- Harvard Crimson (NCAA) (1903–present); Harvard Crimson men's soccer (1905–1982); Boston Patriots (NFL) (1970); Boston Cannons (MLL) (2007–2014, 2016–2018); Boston Cannons (PLL) (2024–present); Boston Breakers (WPS/NWSL) (2009–2011, 2014); Boston Brawlers (FXFL) (2014)

Website
- gocrimson.com/harvardstadium

- Harvard Stadium
- U.S. National Register of Historic Places
- U.S. National Historic Landmark
- Location within Greater Boston area Location within Massachusetts Location within the United States
- Location: 60 N. Harvard St., Boston, Massachusetts
- Coordinates: 42°21′59″N 71°7′38″W
- Area: 11 acres (4.5 ha)
- Built: 1903
- Architects: Charles F. McKim, George Bruns de Gersdorff, Lewis Johnson
- Architectural style: Classical Revival
- NRHP reference No.: 87000757
- Added to NRHP: February 27, 1987

Harvard Stadium is a U-shaped college football stadium in the Allston neighborhood of Boston, Massachusetts. Owned and operated by Harvard University, it is home to the Harvard Crimson football program and can seat just over 25,000 spectators.

Opened in 1903, it is the oldest original stadium structure still in use for college football and the nation's oldest permanent concrete structure dedicated to intercollegiate athletics. While the University of Pennsylvania's Franklin Field (1895) is the oldest site in continuous use, its current stadium structure dates from a 1922 reconstruction.

The stadium was a pioneering execution of reinforced concrete in the construction of large structures. Because of its early importance in these areas, and its influence on the design of later stadiums, it was designated a National Historic Landmark in 1987, one of only four athletic facilities so designated.

== History ==
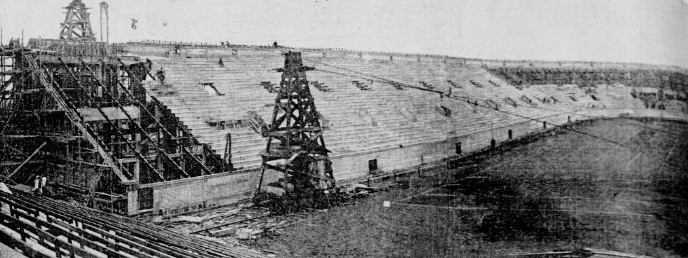
The stadium under construction, 1903

Harvard Stadium was constructed on 31 acres (13 ha) of land known as Soldiers Field, donated to Harvard University by former Harvard College student and University patron Henry Lee Higginson in 1890 as a memorial to Harvard men who had died in the Civil War (1861–1865).

Lewis Jerome Johnson, professor of civil engineering at Harvard, was a consultant to the design team for the stadium. Johnson proposed to use reinforced structural concrete, which had previously been used in horizontal design, such as floors and sidewalks. (A plaque dedicating the stadium to him hangs on the east end wall outside the stadium.) George Bruns de Gersdorff worked on the overall design, with Charles Follen McKim, a principal architect of McKim, Mead & White, as consultant.

The structure, similar in shape to the Panathenaic Stadium, was completed in just 4 1/2 months, costing $310,000. Much of the funds raised came from a 25th-reunion gift by Harvard's Class of 1879.

Just four years later, Harvard Stadium was displaced as the largest concrete stadium in the nation by Syracuse University's Archbold Stadium in 1907.

It is the home of Harvard's football team. The stadium also hosted the Crimson track and field teams until 1984.

In 1929, permanent steel stands (completing a stadium shape) were installed in the stadium's northeast end zone, increasing seating capacity to 57,166. They were torn down after the 1951 season, due to deterioration and reduced attendance. Afterward, there were smaller temporary steel bleachers across the stadium's open end until the building of the Murr Center (which is topped by the new scoreboard) in 1998.

In 1970, Harvard Stadium hosted the Boston Patriots season. It was their first season in the NFL after the AFL–NFL merger and their last before becoming the New England Patriots. The team moved to Schaefer Stadium in Foxborough the following season, meeting the post-AFL–NFL merger requirement to hold games in stadiums no smaller than 50,000 seats.

Harvard installed FieldTurf and lights in 2006. On September 22, 2007, Harvard played its first night game at the stadium, beating Brown University, 24–17 .

=== Influence on American football ===
In the early 20th century, American football was an extremely violent sport; 18 players died and 159 were seriously injured in 1905 alone. There was a widespread movement to outlaw the game but U.S. president Theodore Roosevelt intervened and demanded the rules of the game be reformed. In 1906, Roosevelt met with representatives from 62 colleges and universities and formed the Intercollegiate Football Conference, the predecessor of the NCAA. The committee's purpose was to develop a uniform set of rules and regulations to make the game safer. A leading proposal, at the time, was widening the field to allow more running room and reduce serious collisions. While it was popular among committee members, Harvard objected. Their recently completed stadium could not accommodate a larger field. Because of the permanent nature of Harvard Stadium, the proposal was rejected and the forward pass was legalized in April 1906. Harvard Stadium led to the creation of two aspects of modern American football: standard field dimensions and the forward pass.

=== Other events ===
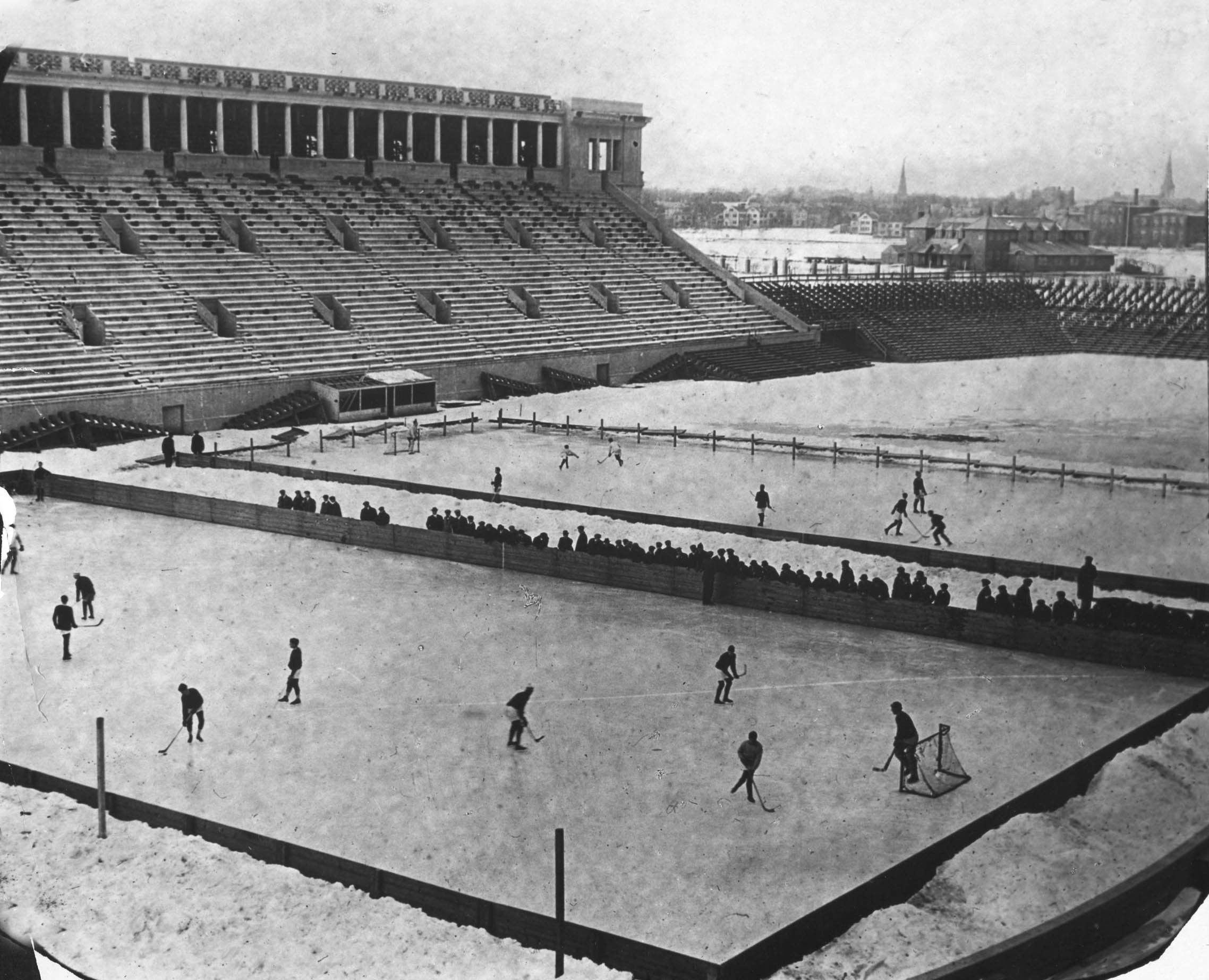
Ice hockey games at Harvard Stadium, 1910

Early in its existence, two ice rinks were built on the stadium during the winter months for the men's ice hockey team. The Stadium served as the home for the hockey team until World War I.

Harvard Stadium was the site of the U.S. Olympic Trials for men's track and field in 1912, 1920, 1924, and 1928.

It is also the host of music festivals like the Amandla Festival, where Jamaican reggae legend Bob Marley performed a historic concert in 1979. Janis Joplin performed her last show at the stadium in 1970, shortly before her death. Other concerts included those by Miles Davis, Ray Charles, Van Morrison, The Band, B.B. King, Ike & Tina Turner, James Taylor, Joan Baez, Sly and the Family Stone, Rahsaan Roland Kirk, The Supremes, Mountain, Ten Years After and Johnny Mathis. During the 1984 Summer Olympics held in Los Angeles, the stadium hosted several soccer preliminaries. In 2007, the Boston Cannons, a professional lacrosse team for Major League Lacrosse, moved their home site to the stadium. They had previously played at Boston University's Nickerson Field. They have since moved to Quincy, Massachusetts.

On April 11, 2009, Harvard Stadium became the home field of the Boston Breakers of the Women's Professional Soccer (WPS) league; they beat Saint Louis Athletica, 2–0.

Harvard Stadium hosted the New England Scholastic Band Association fall marching band championships on November 1, 2026.

=== Soccer ===
Soccer games played at Harvard Stadium during the 1984 Summer Olympics.

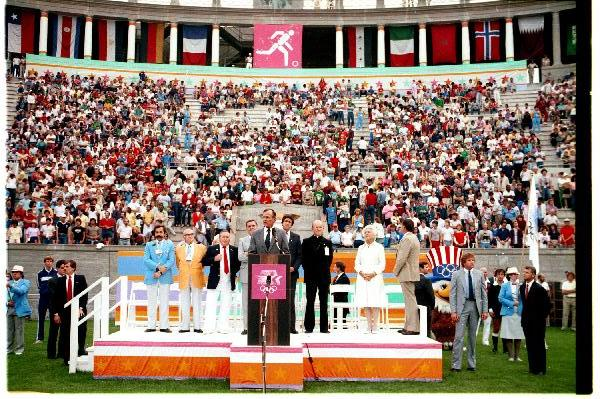
George H. W. Bush participates in the Opening Ceremonies for Olympic soccer tournament in 1984

Date	Time (EDT)	Team #1	Result	Team #2	Round	Attendance
July 29	19:30	Norway	0–0	Chile	Group A	25,000
July 30	19:30	Canada	1–1	Iraq	Group B	16,730
July 31	19:00	Norway	1–2	France	Group A	27,832
August 1	19:00	Cameroon	1–0	Iraq	Group B	20,000
August 2	19:00	Qatar	0–2	Norway	Group A	17,529
August 3	19:00	Cameroon	1–3	Canada	Group B	27,261

== Panoramas ==
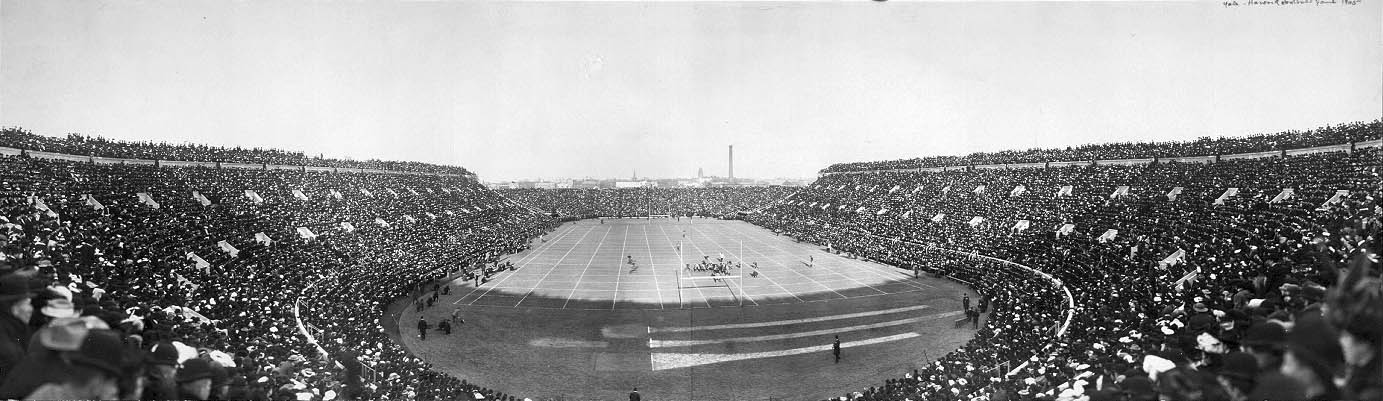
Harvard–Yale game in 1905
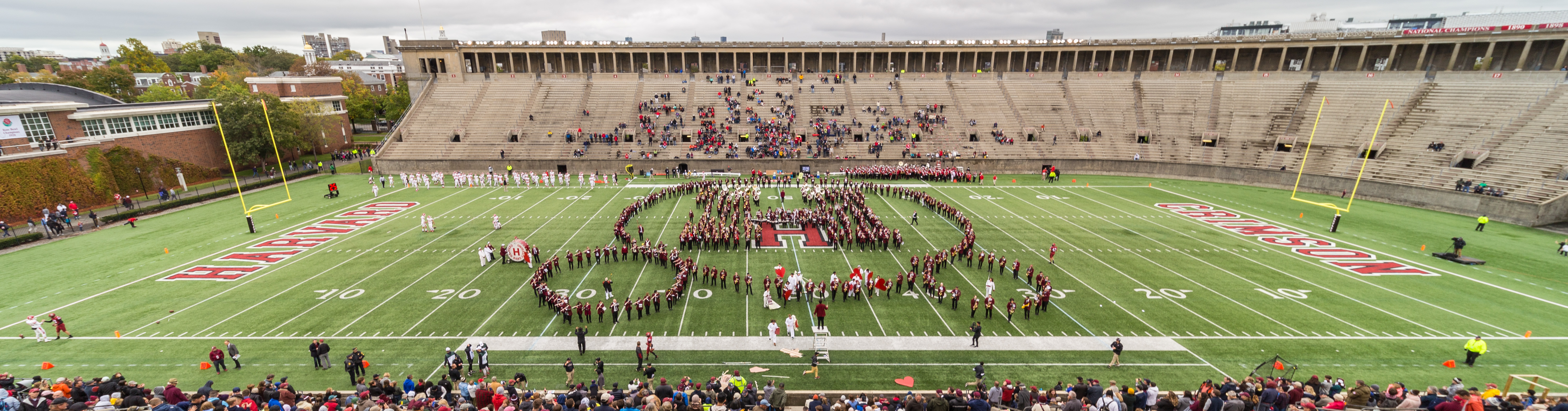
To mark the 100th anniversary of Harvard's marching band, hundreds of alumni joined the band on the field on October 12, 2019

== Location ==
Although most of Harvard's campus is in Cambridge, the stadium and most other intercollegiate athletic facilities, along with Harvard Business School, lie to the south, across the Charles River, in the nearby Allston neighborhood of Boston. Several donations of land from Henry Wadsworth Longfellow, his family, and friends beginning in 1870 on the Brighton/Allston side of the Charles River through to an 1890's gift from Henry Lee Higginson, which gave the tract the name "Soldier's Field", determined the location of the athletics complex.

The stadium is the most iconic piece of the Soldiers Field athletic complex, which also includes the baseball stadium, outdoor track, an artificial turf field hockey/lacrosse field, two soccer stadiums including Jordan Field, pools, Beren Tennis Center (outdoor), the Gordon Indoor Track, Dillon Fieldhouse, Lavietes Pavilion, and Bright Hockey Center. Newell Boathouse, home of Harvard's men's crew, lies across Soldiers Field Road on the banks of the Charles. The stadium's horseshoe opens to the northeast, towards the river, and the press box is at the top of the northwest sideline's grandstand.

The running track has been removed; it was non-standard, with long straights and tight turns, and the outside lanes were very near the stadium walls.

== Gallery ==
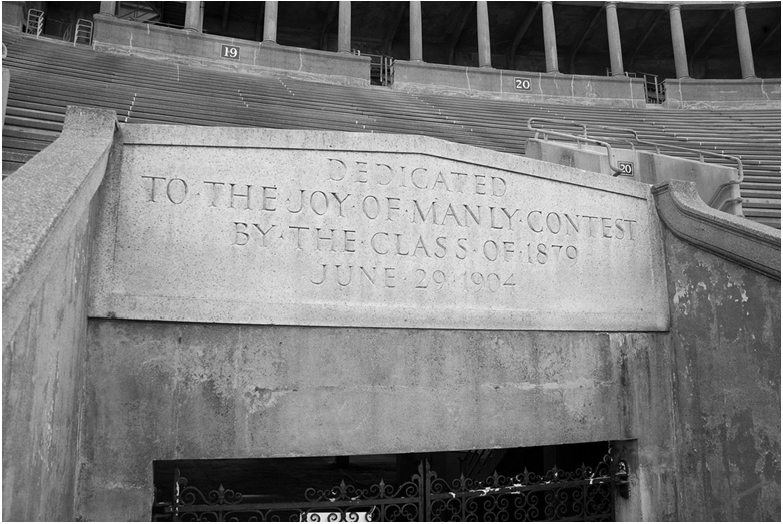
Dedication plaque by the Class of 1879–1903

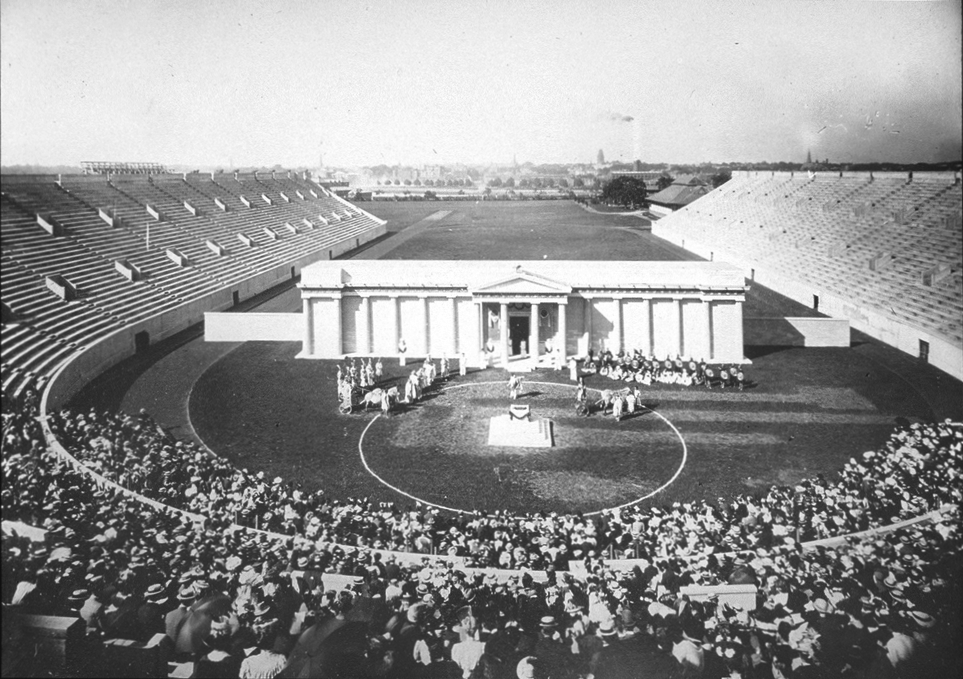
Performance of Greek play – 1905

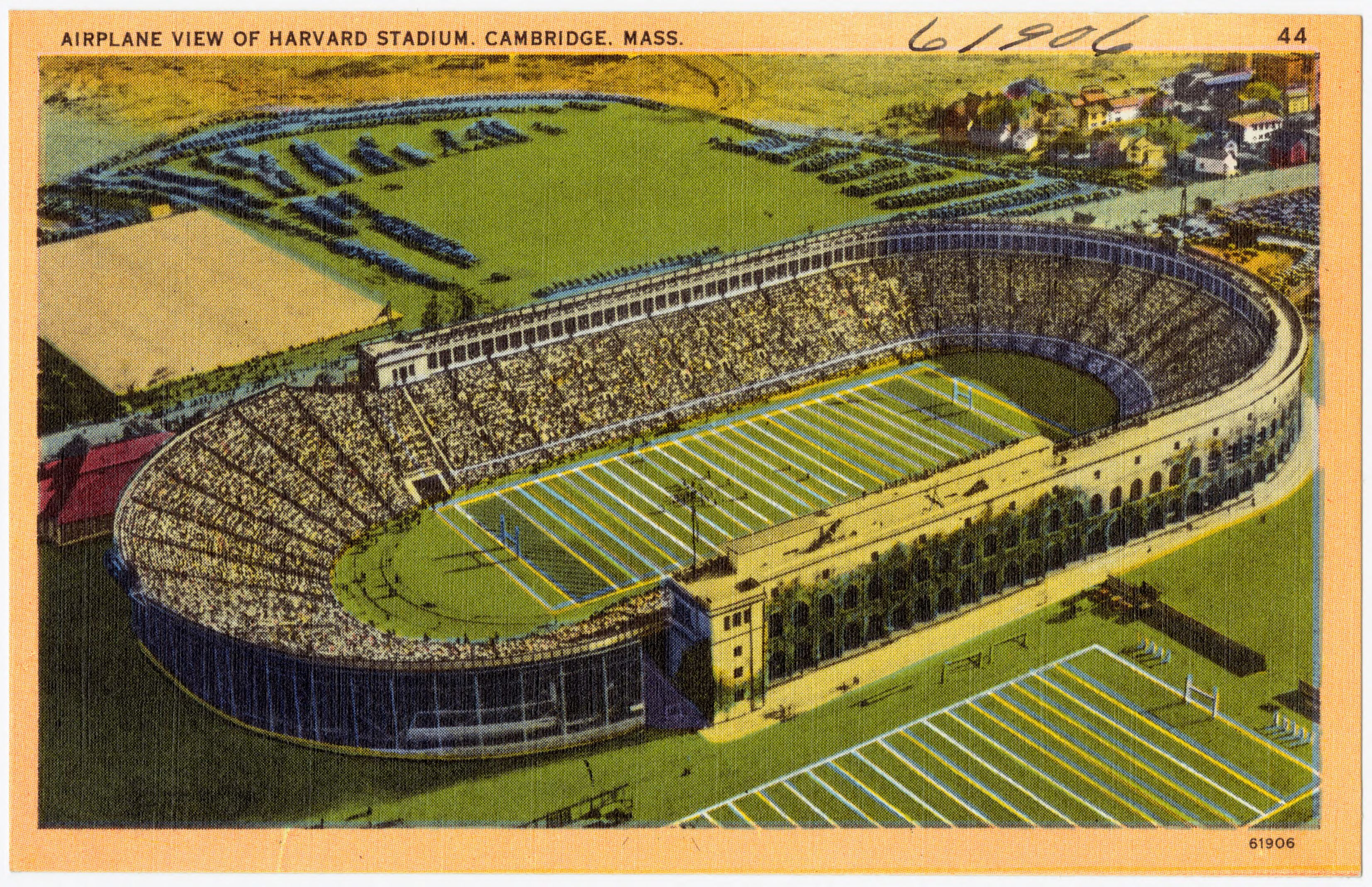
Aerial view, c. 1930–45

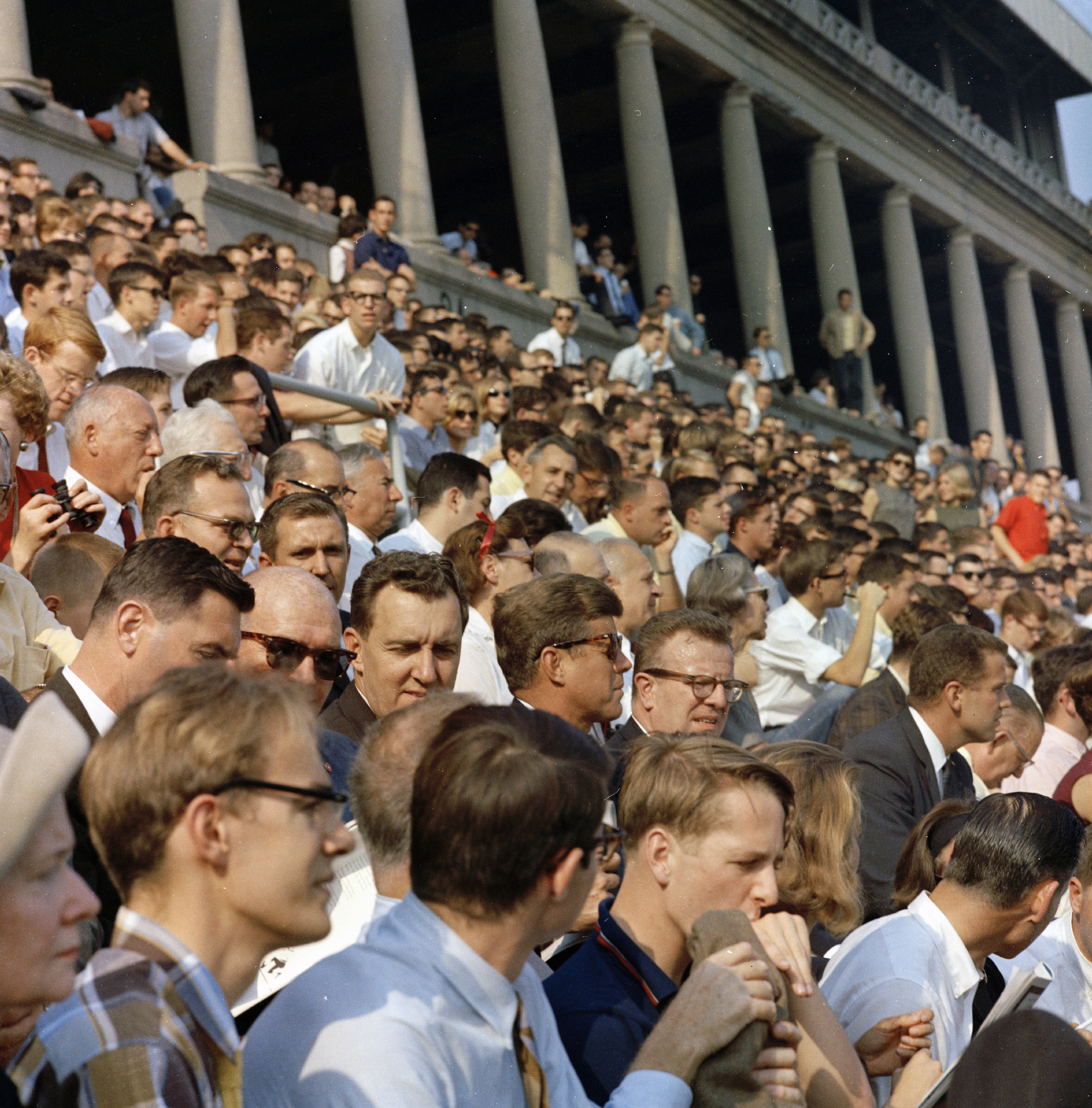
John F. Kennedy attending a game in 1963

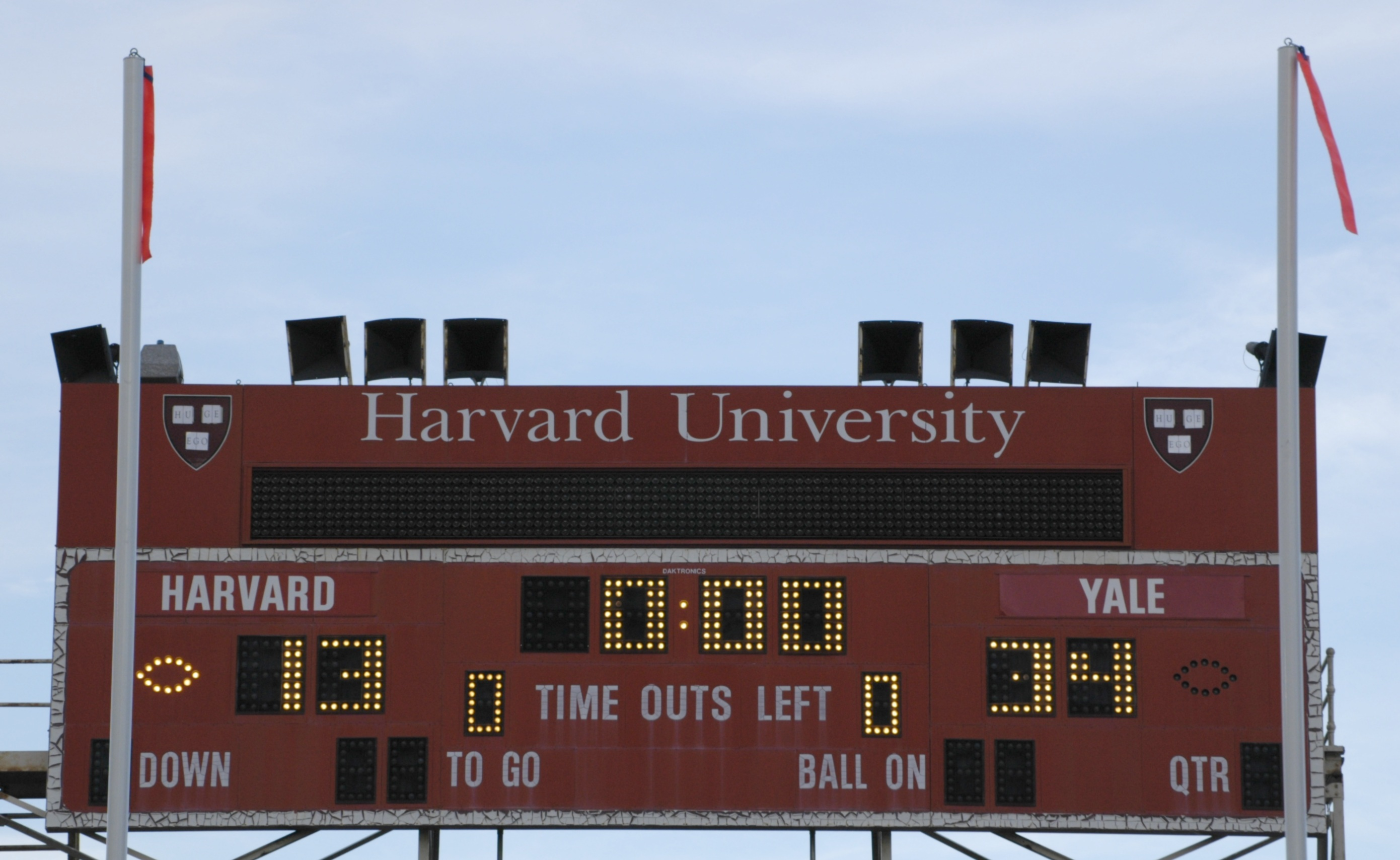
Scoreboard – 1984–2007

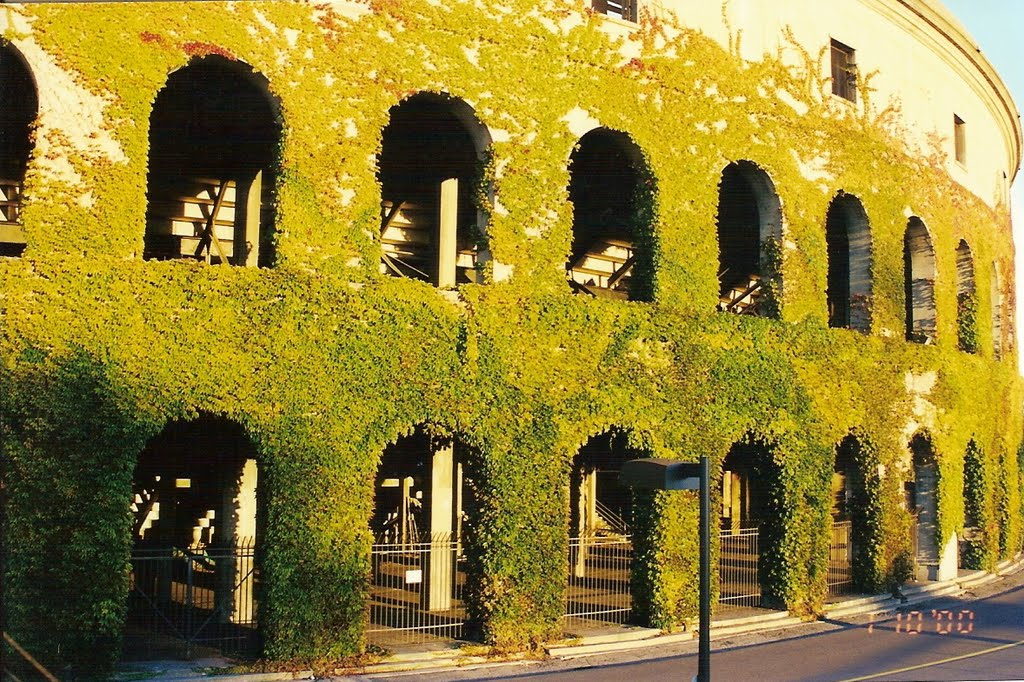
Exterior ivy, removed in 2006

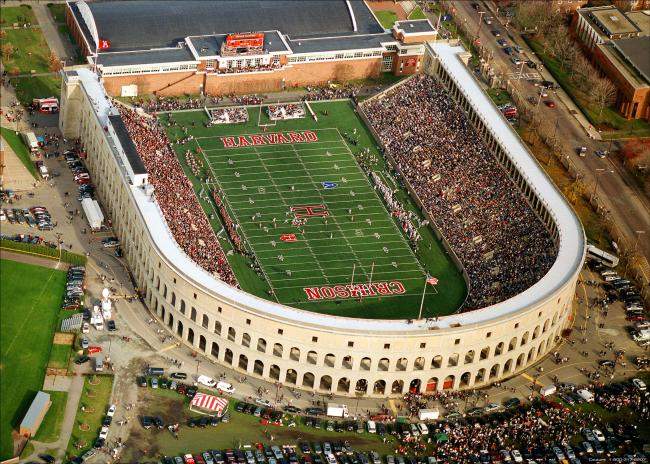
Aerial view of the 2006 Harvard–Yale game – the Murr Center (built in 1998) now sits across the open end of the stadium

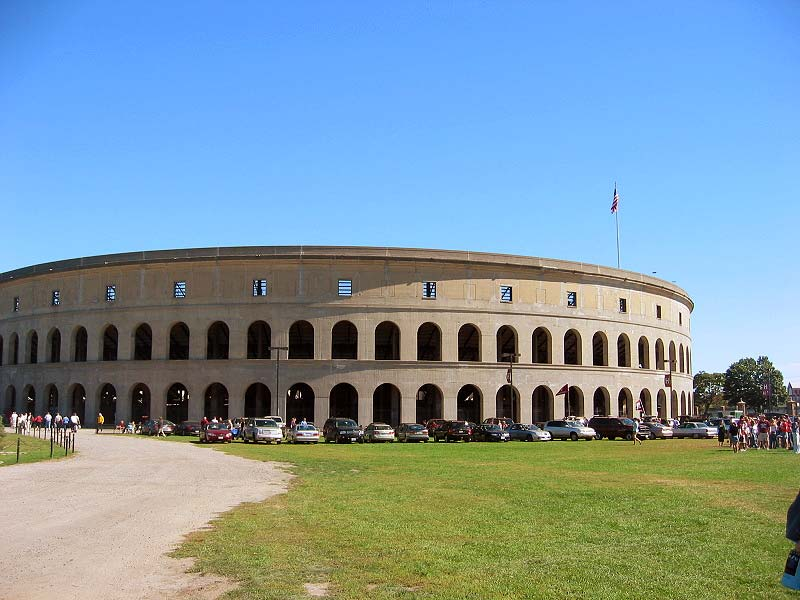
The stadium's southwest-facing exterior, 2006

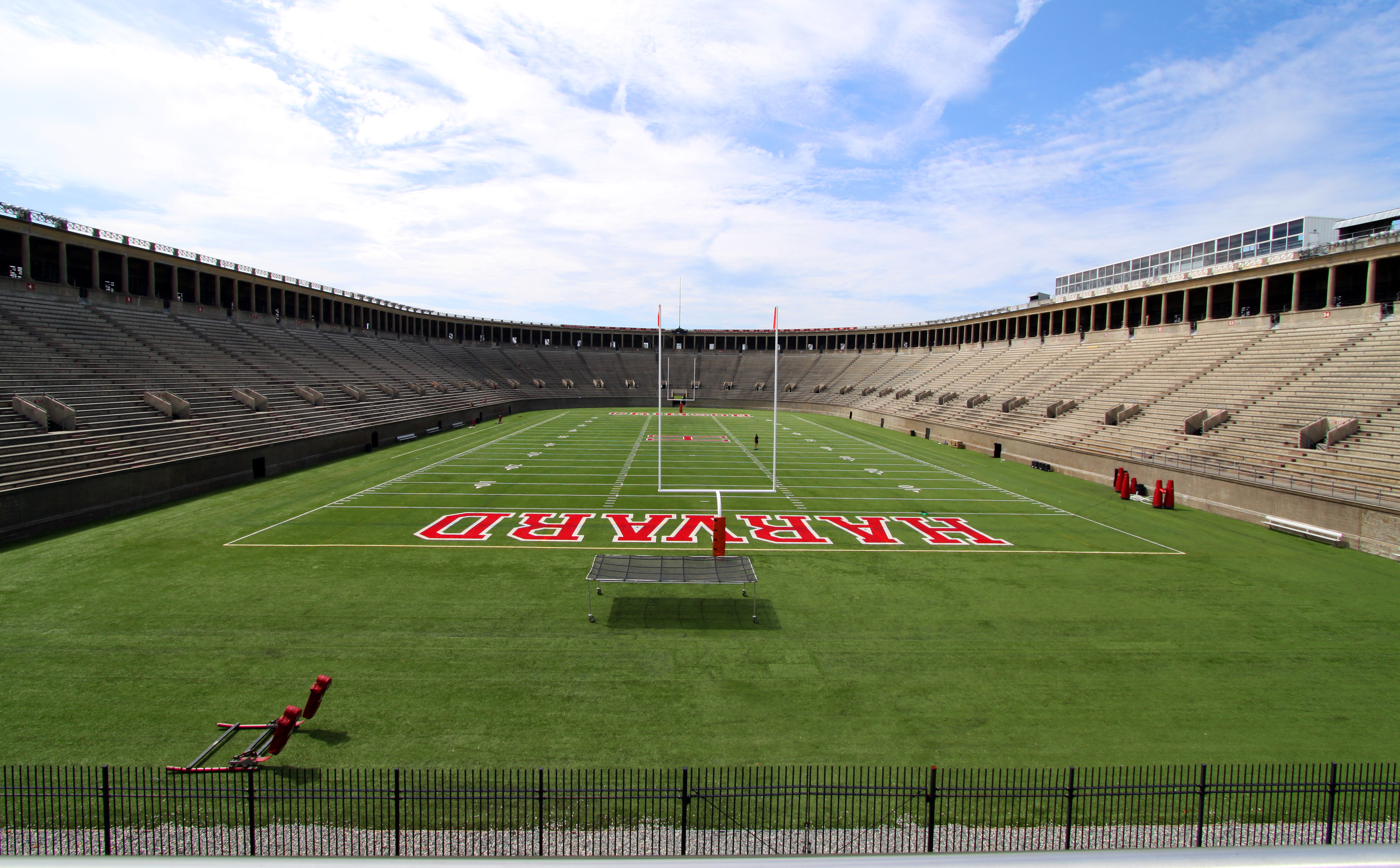
View of the field in 2009

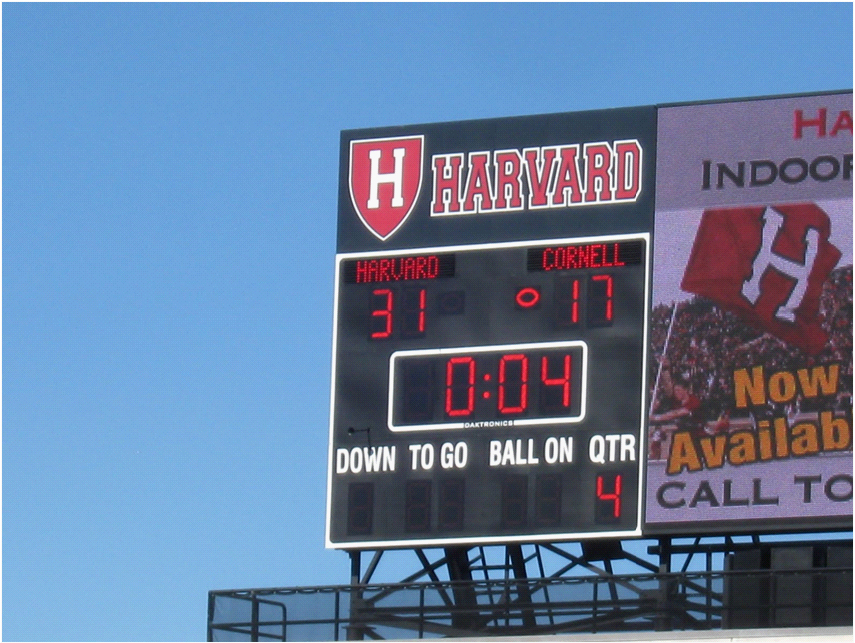
Scoreboard, 2011

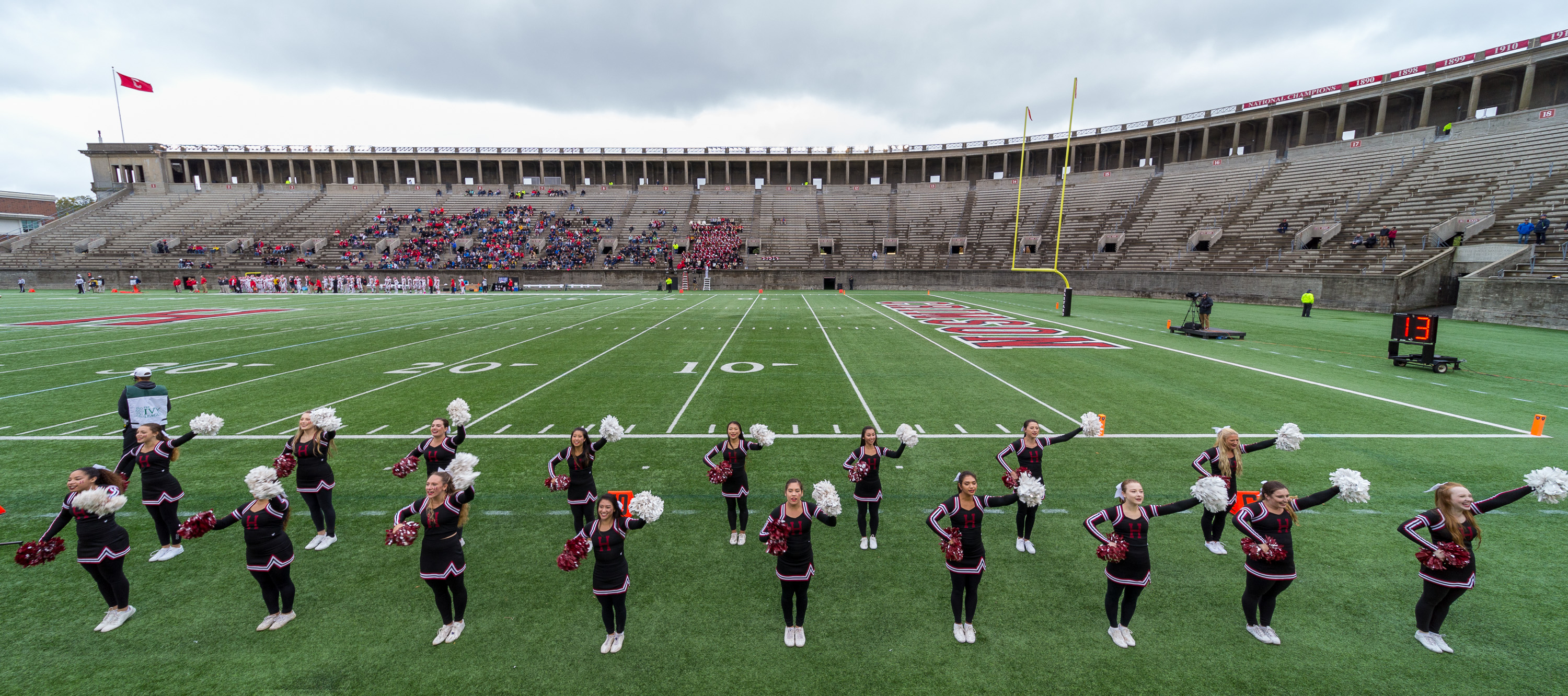
Cheerleaders in Harvard Stadium, 2019

== See also ==
- Harvard Crimson
- List of NCAA Division I FCS football stadiums
- List of National Historic Landmarks in Massachusetts
- National Register of Historic Places listings in northern Boston, Massachusetts

Preceded by Alumni Stadium	Home of the Boston Patriots; 1970	Succeeded by Foxboro Stadium
Preceded by various venues Soviet Union	Summer Olympics; Soccer venue 1984	Succeeded by various venues South Korea
Preceded by Nickerson Field	Home of the Boston Cannons; 2007–2018	Succeeded by Veterans Memorial Stadium (Quincy)
