= List of Montana Grizzlies head football coaches =

List of head football coaches for the Montana Grizzlies

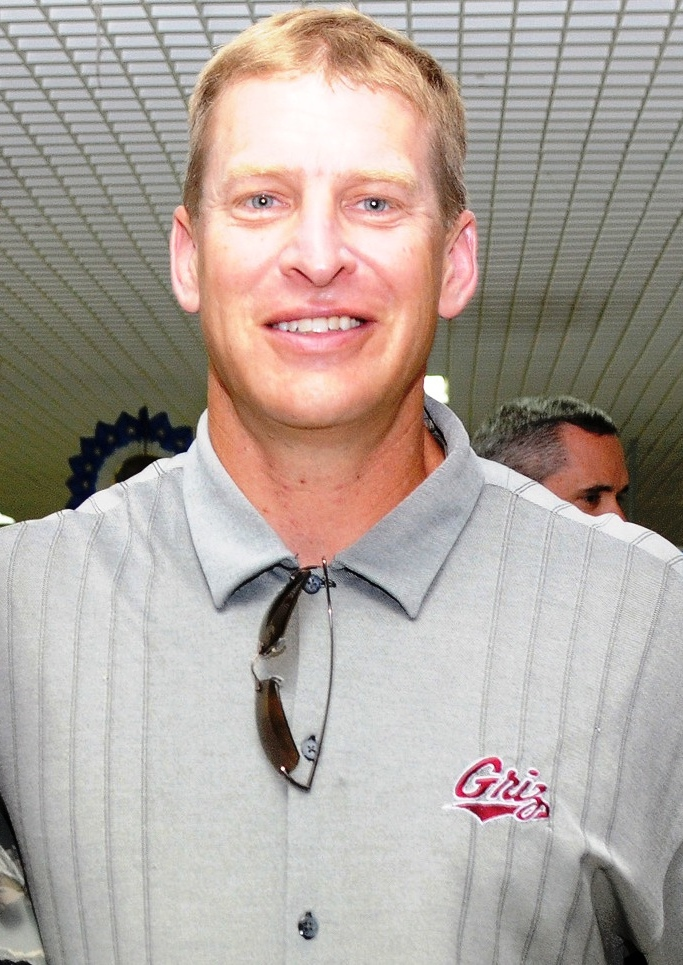
Bobby Hauck has served as head coach of the Grizzlies since November 2017, and previously served in the same capacity from 2003–2009.

The Montana Grizzlies college football team represents the University of Montana in the Big Sky Conference (Big Sky), as part of the NCAA Division I Football Bowl Subdivision. The program has had 36 head coaches since it began play during the 1897 season. Since November 2017, Bobby Hauck has served as Montana's head coach.

Nine coaches have led Montana in the postseason: Jack Swarthout, Larry Donovan, Don Read, Mick Dennehy, Joe Glenn, Robin Pflugrad, Mick Delaney, Bob Stitt, and Hauck. Seven of those coaches also won conference championships: Hauck captured eight; Dennehy and Glenn captured three; Read and Swarthout captured two; and, Donovan and Pflugrad each captured one as a member of the Big Sky. Two have also captured national championships as head coach at Montana: Read (1995) and Glenn (2001).

Hauck is the leader in seasons coached, with 14 years as head coach and games coached (165) and won (129). Glenn has the highest winning percentage at 0.867. Dewitt Peck and Clyde Carpenter have the lowest winning percentage of those who have coached more than one game, with 0.000. Of the 36 different head coaches who have led the Grizzlies, Bernie Bierman has been inducted into the College Football Hall of Fame.

== Key ==
Key to symbols in coaches list
General		Overall		Conference		Postseason (Note: Although the first Rose Bowl Game was played in 1902, it has been continuously played since the 1916 game, and is recognized as the oldest bowl game by the NCAA. "—" indicates any season prior to 1916 when postseason games were not played.)	
No.	Order of coaches (Note: A running total of the number of head coaches, with coaches who served separate tenures being counted only once. Interim head coaches are represented with "Int" and are not counted in the running total. "—" indicates the team played but either without a coach or no coach is on record. "X" indicates an interim year without play.)	GC	Games coached	CW	Conference wins	PW	Postseason wins
DC	Division championships	OW	Overall wins	CL	Conference losses	PL	Postseason losses
CC	Conference championships	OL	Overall losses	CT	Conference ties	PT	Postseason ties
NC	National championships	OT	Overall ties (Note: Overtime rules in college football were introduced in 1996, making ties impossible in the period since.)	C%	Conference winning percentage		
†	Elected to the College Football Hall of Fame	O%	Overall winning percentage (Note: When computing the win–loss percentage, a tie counts as half a win and half a loss.)				

== Coaches ==
List of head football coaches showing season(s) coached, overall records, conference records (Note: Montana has been a member of Big Sky Conference since the 1963 season.), postseason records, championships and selected awards (Note: Statistics correct as of the end of the 2025 NCAA Division I FCS football season.)
No.	Name	Season(s)	GC	OW	OL	OT	O%	CW	CL	CT	C%	PW	PL	PT	CCs	NCs	Awards
1	Fred D. Smith	1897	6	1	2	3	0.417	—	—	—	—	—	—	—	—	0	—
2	Benjamin F. Searight	1898	5	3	2	0	0.600	—	—	—	—	—	—	—	—	0	—
3	Guy Cleveland	1899	3	1	2	0	0.333	—	—	—	—	—	—	—	—	0	—
4	Frank Bean	1900–1901	6	2	4	0	0.333	—	—	—	—	—	—	—	—	0	—
5	Dewitt Peck	1902	3	0	3	0	.000	—	—	—	—	—	—	—	—	0	—
6	Hiram Conibear	1903–1904	12	5	7	0	0.417	—	—	—	—	—	—	—	—	0	—
7	Frederick Schule	1905–1906	11	4	7	0	0.364	—	—	—	—	—	—	—	—	0	—
8	Albion Findlay	1907	6	4	1	1	0.750	—	—	—	—	—	—	—	—	0	—
9	Roy White	1908–1909	11	7	2	2	0.727	—	—	—	—	—	—	—	—	0	—
10	Robert H. Cary	1910–1911	9	5	3	1	0.611	—	—	—	—	—	—	—	—	0	—
11	Wallace Philoon	1912	7	4	3	0	0.571	—	—	—	—	—	—	—	—	0	—
12	A. George Heilman	1913–1914	14	9	4	1	0.679	—	—	—	—	—	—	—	—	0	—
13	Jerry Nissen	1915–1917	17	7	7	3	0.500	—	—	—	—	—	—	—	—	0	—
14	Bernie Bierman^{†}	1919–1921	21	9	9	3	0.500	0	7	1	0.063	—	—	—	—	0	—
15	John W. Stewart	1922–1923	15	7	8	0	0.467	1	7	0	0.125	—	—	—	—	0	—
16	Earl Clark	1924–1925	16	7	8	1	0.469	3	8	1	0.292	—	—	—	0	0	—
17	Frank W. Milburn	1926–1930	43	18	22	3	0.453	1	20	1	0.068	—	—	—	0	0	—
18	Bunny Oakes	1931–1934	31	8	22	1	0.274	0	18	1	0.026	—	—	—	0	0	—
19	Doug Fessenden	1931–1934; 1946–1948	90	46	40	4	0.533	7	24	1	0.234	—	—	—	0	0	—
20	Clyde Carpenter	1942	8	0	8	0	.000	0	6	0	.000	—	—	—	0	0	—
21	George Dahlberg	1945	5	1	4	0	0.200	0	1	0	.000	—	—	—	0	0	—
22	Ted Shipkey	1949–1951	28	12	16	0	0.429	1	7	0	0.125	—	—	—	0	0	—
23	Ed Chinske	1952–1954	27	8	18	1	0.315	4	14	0	0.222	—	—	—	0	0	—
24	Jerry Williams	1955–1957	29	6	23	0	0.207	5	15	0	0.250	—	—	—	0	0	—
25	Ray Jenkins	1958–1963	57	14	43	0	0.246	5	24	0	0.172	—	—	—	0	0	—
26	Hugh Davidson	1964–1966	28	8	20	0	0.286	3	8	0	0.273	—	—	—	0	0	—
27	Jack Swarthout	1967–1975	93	51	41	1	0.554	24	21	1	0.533	0	2	0	2	0	—
28	Gene Carlson	1976–1979	41	16	25	0	0.390	10	15	0	0.400	0	0	0	0	0	—
29	Larry Donovan	1980–1985	64	25	38	1	0.398	16	26	0	0.381	0	1	0	1	0	—
30	Don Read	1986–1995	121	85	36	0	0.702	54	22	0	0.711	8	4	0	2	1 – 1995	AFCA Division I-AA COY (1995)
31	Mick Dennehy	1996–1999	51	39	12	—	0.765	27	5	—	0.844	3	4	—	3	0	—
32	Joe Glenn	2000–2002	45	39	6	—	0.867	20	2	—	0.909	8	2	—	3	1 – 2001	—
33	Bobby Hauck	2003–2009; 2018–present	194	151	43	—	0.778	86	23	—	0.789	20	13	—	8	0	—
34	Robin Pflugrad (Note: Pflugrad's record does not include 5 total wins and 2 conference wins during 2011 season which were vacated by the NCAA in 2013. The 2011 team's on-field conference record was 7–1 and overall record was 11–3.)	2010–2011	20	13	7	—	0.650	10	4	—	0.714	0	1	—	1	0	—
35	Mick Delaney	2012–2014	38	24	14	—	0.632	15	9	—	0.625	0	2	—	0	0	—
36	Bob Stitt	2015–2017	35	21	14	—	0.600	14	11	—	0.560	1	1	—	0	0	—
