= List of Montana Grizzlies football seasons =

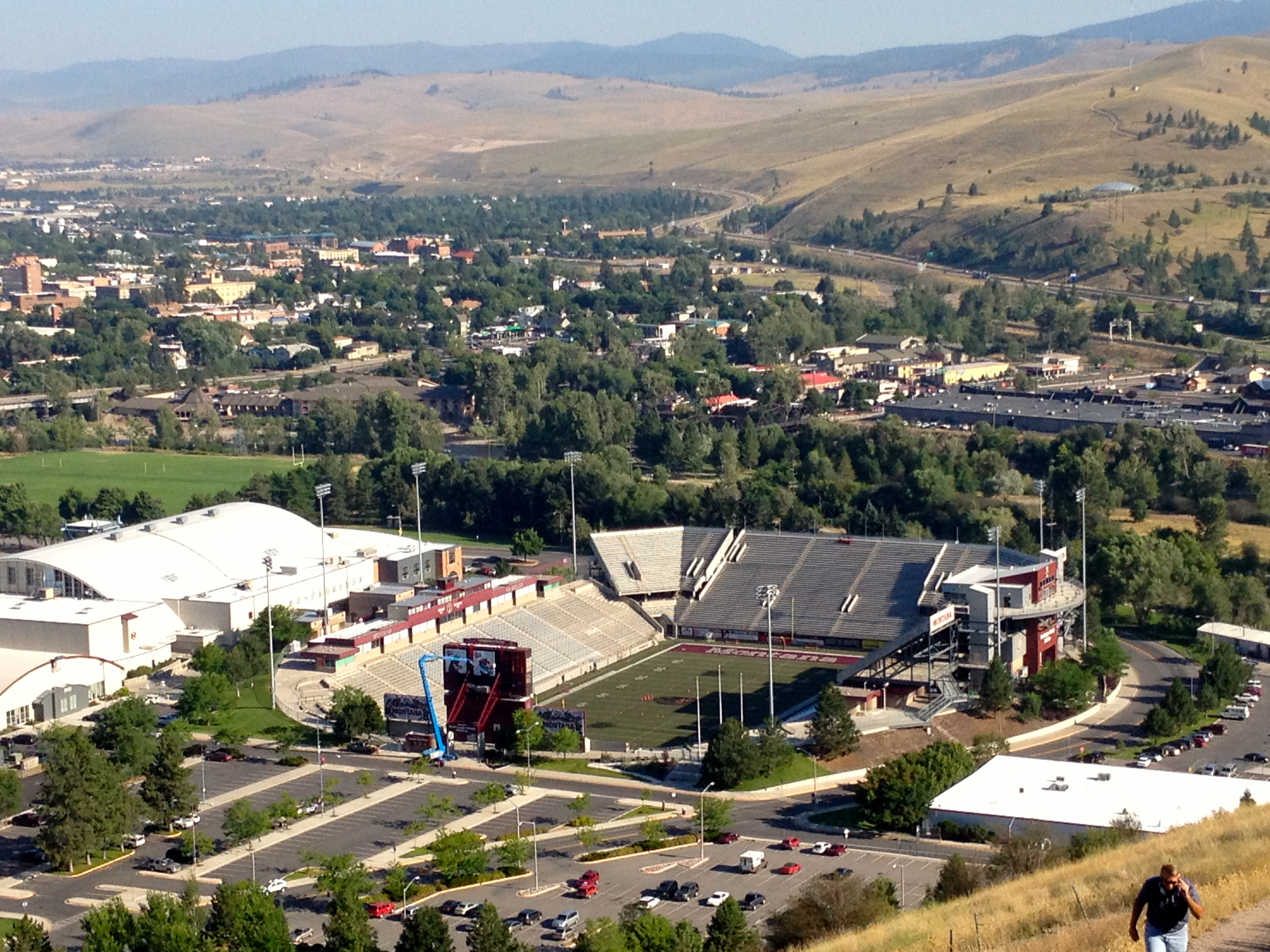
Washington–Grizzly Stadium, where the Grizzlies have played since 1986.

This is a list of seasons completed by the Montana Grizzlies football team of the National Collegiate Athletic Association (NCAA) Division I Football Championship Subdivision (FCS). Since the team's creation in 1893, the Grizzlies have participated in more than 1,100 officially sanctioned games.

== Seasons ==
Year	Coach	Overall	Conference	Standing	Bowl/playoffs	Coaches^{#}	TSN^{°}
Fred Smith (Independent) (1897)
1897	Fred Smith	1–2–3					
Benjamin F. Searight (Independent) (1898)
1898	Benjamin F. Searight	3–2					
Guy Cleveland (Independent) (1899)
1899	Guy Cleveland	1–2					
Frank Bean (Independent) (1900–1901)
1900	Frank Bean	0–1					
1901	Frank Bean	2–3					
Dewitt Peck (Independent) (1902)
1902	Dewitt Peck	0–2					
Hiram Conibear (Independent) (1903–1904)
1903	Hiram Conibear	2–5					
1904	Hiram Conibear	3–2					
Frederick Schule (Independent) (1905–1906)
1905	Frederick Schule	2–3					
1905	Frederick Schule	2–4					
Albion Findlay (Independent) (1907)
1907	Albion Findlay	4–1–1					
Roy White (Independent) (1908–1909)
1908	Roy White	1–2–1					
1909	Roy White	6–0–1					
Robert H. Cary (Independent) (1910–1911)
1910	Robert H. Cary	3–2–1					
1911	Robert H. Cary	2–1					
Wallace Philoon (Independent) (1912)
1912	Wallace Philoon	4–3					
A. George Heilman (Independent) (1913–1914)
1913	A. George Heilman	2–4					
1914	A. George Heilman	7–0–1					
Jerry Nissen (Independent) (1915–1917)
1915	Jerry Nissen	2–2–2					
1916	Jerry Nissen	4–1–1					
1917	Jerry Nissen	1–4					
1918	No team						
Bernie Bierman (Independent) (1919–1921)
1919	Bernie Bierman	2–3–2					
1920	Bernie Bierman	4–3					
1921	Bernie Bierman	3–3–1					
J.W. Stewart (Independent) (1922–1923)
1922	J.W. Stewart	3–4					
1923	J.W. Stewart	4–4					
Earl Clark (Pacific Coast Conference) (1924–1925)
1924	Earl Clark	4–4	0–3	9th			
1925	Earl Clark	3–4–1	1–4	8th			
Frank W. Milburn (Pacific Coast Conference) (1926–1930)
1926	Frank W. Milburn	3–5	0–4	8th			
1927	Frank W. Milburn	3–4–1	0–4	9th			
1928	Frank W. Milburn	4–5–1	0–5	10th			
1929	Frank W. Milburn	3–5–1	0–4–1	9th			
1930	Frank W. Milburn	5–3	1–3	7th			
Bunny Oakes (Pacific Coast Conference) (1931–1934)
1931	Bunny Oakes	1–6	0–5	10th			
1932	Bunny Oakes	2–7	0–5	10th			
1933	Bunny Oakes	3–4	0–4	10th			
1934	Bunny Oakes	2–5–1	0–4–1	10th			
Doug Fessenden (Pacific Coast Conference) (1935–1941)
1935	Doug Fessenden	1–5–2	0–5–1	10th			
1936	Doug Fessenden	6–3	1–3	8th			
1937	Doug Fessenden	7–1	0–1	10th			
1938	Doug Fessenden	5–3–1	0–1	10th			
1939	Doug Fessenden	3–6	1–2	7th			
1940	Doug Fessenden	4–4–1	1–2	8th			
1941	Doug Fessenden	6–3	1–3	9th			
Clyde Carpenter (Pacific Coast Conference) (1942)
1942	Clyde Carpenter	0–8	0–6	10th			
1943	No team						
1944	No team						
George Dahlberg (Pacific Coast Conference) (1945)
1945	George Dahlberg	1–4	0–1	9th			
Doug Fessenden (Pacific Coast Conference) (1946–1948)
1946	Doug Fessenden	4–4	1–3	7th			
1947	Doug Fessenden	7–4	2–1	5th			
1948	Doug Fessenden	3–7	0–3	10th			
Ted Shipkey (Pacific Coast Conference) (1949)
1949	Ted Shipkey	5–4	0–3	10th			
Ted Shipkey (Independent) (1950)
1950	Ted Shipkey	5–5					
Ted Shipkey (Mountain States Conference) (1951)
1951	Ted Shipkey	2–7	1–4	8th			
Ed Chinske (Mountain States Conference) (1952–1954)
1952	Ed Chinske	2–7–1	1–5	7th			
1953	Chinske	3–5	2–4	6th			
1954	Chinske	3–6	1–5	7th			
Jerry Williams (Mountain States Conference) (1955–1957)
1955	Jerry Williams	3–7	2–4	6th			
1956	Jerry Williams	1–9	1–6	8th			
1957	Jerry Williams	2–7	2–5	T–6th			
Ray Jenkins (Mountain States Conference) (1958–1961)
1958	Ray Jenkins	0–10	0–7	8th			
1959	Ray Jenkins	1–8	1–5	8th			
1960	Ray Jenkins	5–5	2–5	T–5th			
1961	Ray Jenkins	2–6	2–4	T–5th			
Ray Jenkins (Independent) (1962)
1962	Ray Jenkins	5–5					
Ray Jenkins (Big Sky Conference) (1963)
1963	Ray Jenkins	1–9	0–3	4th			
Hugh Davidson (Big Sky Conference) (1964–1966)
1964	Hugh Davidson	3–6	1–2	3rd			
1965	Hugh Davidson	4–6	2–2	3rd			
1966	Hugh Davidson	1–8	0–4	5th			
Jack Swarthout (Big Sky Conference) (1967–1975)
1967	Jack Swarthout	7–3	2–2	T–2nd			
1968	Jack Swarthout	2–7	0–4	5th			
1969	Jack Swarthout	10–1	4–0	1st	L Camellia		
1970	Jack Swarthout	10–1	5–0	1st	L Camellia		
1971	Jack Swarthout	6–5	3–2	3rd			
1972	Jack Swarthout	3–8	3–3	T–3rd			
1973	Jack Swarthout	4–6	2–4	T–4th			
1974	Jack Swarthout	3–6–1	2–3–1	4th			
1975	Jack Swarthout	6–4	3–3	4th			
Gene Carlson (Big Sky Conference) (1976–1979)
1976	Gene Carlson	4–6	3–3	5th			
1977	Gene Carlson	4–6	1–5	7th			
1978	Gene Carlson	5–6	4–2	T–2nd			
1979	Gene Carlson	3–7	2–5	T–6th			
Larry Donovan (Big Sky Conference) (1980–1985)
1980	Larry Donovan	3–7	1–6	8th			
1981	Larry Donovan	7–3	5–2	3rd			
1982	Larry Donovan	6–6	5–2	T–1st			19
1983	Larry Donovan	4–6	3–4	T–5th			
1984	Larry Donovan	2–8–1	0–7	8th			
1985	Larry Donovan	3–8	2–5	6th			
Don Read (Big Sky Conference) (1986–1995)
1986	Don Read	6–4	4–4	4th			
1987	Don Read	6–5	5–3	3rd			
1988	Don Read	8–4	6–2	2nd	L NCAA Division I-AA First Round		16
1989	Don Read	11–3	7–1	2nd	L NCAA Division I-AA Semifinal		6
1990	Don Read	7–4	4–4	4th			
1991	Don Read	7–4	6–2	T–2nd			
1992	Don Read	6–5	4–3	T–3rd			
1993	Don Read	10–2	7–0	1st	L NCAA Division I-AA First Round		3
1994	Don Read	11–3	5–2	T–2nd	L NCAA Division I-AA Semifinal		8
1995	Don Read	13–2	6–1	1st	W NCAA Division I-AA Championship		8
Mick Dennehy (Big Sky Conference) (1996–1999)
1996	Mick Dennehy	14–1	8–0	1st	L Division I-AA Championship		2
1997	Mick Dennehy	8–4	6–2	2nd	L Division I-AA First Round		11
1998	Mick Dennehy	8–4	6–2	1st	L Division I-AA First Round		14
1999	Mick Dennehy	9–3	7–1	1st	L Division I-AA First Round		8
Joe Glenn (Big Sky Conference) (2000–2002)
2000	Joe Glenn	13–2	8–0	1st	L NCAA Division I-AA Championship		2
2001	Joe Glenn	15–1	7–0	1st	W NCAA Division I-AA Championship		1
2002	Joe Glenn	11–2	5–2	T–1st	L NCAA Division I-AA Quarterfinal		7
Bobby Hauck (Big Sky Conference) (2003–2009)
2003	Bobby Hauck	9–4	5–2	T–1st	L NCAA Division I-AA First Round		14
2004	Bobby Hauck	12–3	6–1	T–1st	L NCAA Division I-AA Championship		2
2005	Bobby Hauck	8–4	5–2	T–1st	L NCAA Division I-AA First Round		12
2006	Bobby Hauck	12–2	8–0	1st	L NCAA Division I Semifinal		3
2007	Bobby Hauck	11–1	8–0	1st	L NCAA Division I First Round	12	10
2008	Bobby Hauck	14–2	7–1	T–1st	L NCAA Division I Championship	2	2
2009	Bobby Hauck	14–1	8–0	1st	L NCAA Division I Championship	2	2
Robin Pflugrad (Big Sky Conference) (2010–2011)
2010	Robin Pflugrad	7–4	5–3	T–3rd		21	20
2011	Robin Pflugrad	11–3 (Note: In July 2013, Montana vacated its last six games, including five wins, of the 2011 season: three wins (including two conference games) during the regular season and its entire NCAA Division I FCS playoffs (two wins and a semifinals loss). Thus, Montana's official record is 6–2 and 5–1 Big Sky.)	7–1	T–1st	L NCAA Division I Semifinal	5	5
Mick Delaney (Big Sky Conference) (2012–2014)
2012	Mick Delaney	5–6	3–5	T–8th			
2013	Mick Delaney	10–3	6–2	3rd	L NCAA Division I Second Round	8	8
2014	Mick Delaney	9–5	6–2	T–2nd	L NCAA Division I Second Round	11	13
Bob Stitt (Big Sky Conference) (2015–2017)
2015	Bob Stitt	8–5	6–2	T–2nd	L NCAA Division I Second Round	14	14
2016	Bob Stitt	6–5	3–5	8th		25	
2017	Bob Stitt	7–4	5–3	T–6th			
Bobby Hauck (Big Sky Conference) (2018–present)
2018	Bobby Hauck	6–5	4–4	T–6th			
2019	Bobby Hauck	10–4	6–2	T–3rd	L NCAA Division I Quarterfinal	6	6
2020	Bobby Hauck	2–0	0–0 (Note: Montana opted out of the conference season, but still scheduled non-conference games due to COVID-19 concerns.)				
2021	Bobby Hauck	10–3	6–2	T–3rd	L NCAA Division I Quarterfinal	6	6
2022	Bobby Hauck	8–5	4–4	6th	L NCAA Division I Second Round	14	14
2023	Bobby Hauck	13-2	7-1	1st	L NCAA Division I Championship	2	2
2024	Bobby Hauck	9–5	5-3	5th	L NCAA Division I Second Round	13	10
2025	Bobby Hauck	13–2	7–1	2nd	L NCAA Division I Semifinal		
Total:							
National championship Conference title Conference division title or championship game berth
^{†}Indicates Bowl Coalition, Bowl Alliance, BCS, or CFP / New Years' Six bowl.; ^{#}Rankings from final Coaches Poll.
