= Little Brown Stein =

Sports trophy

Idaho–Montana football rivalry
- Idaho Vandals Montana Grizzlies
- First meeting: 1903, 123 years ago Idaho, 28–0
- Latest meeting: October 17, 2026; Idaho 42, #7 Montana 35
- Next meeting: 2027

Statistics
- Total meetings: 91
- All-time series: Idaho leads, 57–32–2 (.637)
- Largest victory: Idaho, 46–0 (1945)
- Longest win streak: Idaho, 8 (1951–1959)
- Current win streak: Idaho, 1 (2026–present)

Locations of Idaho and Montana

The Little Brown Stein is a rivalry trophy awarded to the winner of the college football game between the University of Idaho Vandals and the University of Montana Grizzlies, both members of the Big Sky Conference. The trophy is, as the name implies, a large stein mug with the results of all the games between the two painted on.

The game was not played for fourteen seasons (2004–2017), and Montana retained the trophy. The series resumed in 2018, when Idaho rejoined the Big Sky for football.

== History ==
Idaho and Montana first met in football 123 years ago in 1903 and have played 88 times; the stein was introduced 88 years ago in 1938 at the 25th meeting. Idaho has dominated the overall series at 57–32–2 (.637), which also includes two Division I-AA playoff wins at home in the 1980s. Montana has had the upper hand since 1991, winning thirteen of the last seventeen (.765). While Idaho was in Division I-A (FBS), from 1996 through 2017, the teams met only five times, with Montana winning the last four.

The schools are about two hundred miles (320 km) apart; Moscow and Missoula are on opposite sides of the lower Idaho panhandle, separated by the Bitterroot Mountains over Lolo Pass (U.S. Route 12).

Idaho hosted the game in southern Idaho at Boise in 1961, and in nearby Pullman, Washington, in 1970 and 2000.

=== Conferences ===
Both were members of the old Pacific Coast Conference (the forerunner of today's Pac-12); Montana departed after the 1949 season, and the PCC disbanded in the summer of 1959. In most years, the loser of the game was last in the PCC standings. Montana was in the Skyline Conference from 1951 through the 1961 season.

The universities were two of the six charter members of the Big Sky Conference in 1963, (although Idaho remained an independent in football until 1965) and their final season as conference opponents was in 1995. While Montana has been in the Big Sky since its inception, Idaho changed its conference affiliation multiple times from 1995 to 2018:

- Idaho moved to the Big West for all sports in 1996, returning to Division I-A after 18 years in I-AA.
- After the 2000 season, the Big West dropped football. Idaho became a football-only member of the Sun Belt Conference in 2001 while remaining a full Big West member.
- Idaho joined the WAC for all sports in 2005 as part of a major NCAA conference realignment.
- After the WAC experienced a near-complete membership turnover in the early 2010s, it dropped football after the 2012 season. Idaho football was an FBS independent for one season in 2013.
- Idaho returned to the Big Sky in 2014 except for football, which rejoined the Sun Belt.
- Idaho dropped back to FCS in 2018 and resumed football membership in the Big Sky.

== Results ==
Idaho victories	Montana victories	Tie games

No.	Date	Location	Winner	Score
1	1903	Moscow, ID	Idaho	28–0
2	October 17, 1914	Moscow, ID	Tie	0–0
3	October 2, 1915	Missoula, MT	Montana	15–3
4	November 18, 1916	Moscow, ID	Montana	20–13
5	November 29, 1917	Missoula, MT	Idaho	14–3
6	November 8, 1919	Moscow, ID	Idaho	7–0
7	November 20, 1920	Missoula, MT	Idaho	20–7
8	November 5, 1921	Moscow, ID	Idaho	35–7
9	November 30, 1922	Missoula, MT	Idaho	39–0
10	October 12, 1923	Moscow, ID	Idaho	40–0
11	October 11, 1924	Missoula, MT	Idaho	41–13
12	November 7, 1925	Moscow, ID	Montana	20–14
13	October 9, 1926	Missoula, MT	Idaho	27–12
14	October 22, 1927	Moscow, ID	Idaho	42–6
15	November 17, 1928	Missoula, MT	Idaho	21–7
16	October 12, 1929	Moscow, ID	Idaho	19–0
17	November 22, 1930	Missoula, MT	Montana	12–6
18	October 10, 1931	Moscow, ID	Idaho	21–19
19	October 15, 1932	Missoula, MT	Idaho	19–6
20	October 28, 1933	Moscow, ID	Idaho	12–6
21	October 27, 1934	Missoula, MT	Idaho	13–6
22	October 26, 1935	Moscow, ID	Idaho	14–7
23	November 14, 1936	Missoula, MT	Montana	16–0
24	November 20, 1937	Moscow, ID	Idaho	6–0
25	October 29, 1938	Missoula, MT	Idaho	19–6
26	October 28, 1939	Moscow, ID	Montana	13–0
27	November 9, 1940	Missoula, MT	Montana	28–18
28	November 15, 1941	Moscow, ID	Montana	16–0
29	October 31, 1942	Missoula, MT	Idaho	21–0
30	October 20, 1945	Moscow, ID	Idaho	46–0
31	November 2, 1946	Missoula, MT	Montana	19–0
32	November 7, 1947	Moscow, ID	Montana	21–0
33	October 23, 1948	Moscow, ID	Idaho	39–0
34	October 22, 1949	Missoula, MT	Idaho	47–19
35	September 30, 1950	Moscow, ID	Montana	28–27
36	October 13, 1951	Missoula, MT	Idaho	12–9
37	November 8, 1952	Moscow, ID	Idaho	27–0
38	October 3, 1953	Missoula, MT	Idaho	20–12
39	November 19, 1955	Moscow, ID	Idaho	31–0
40	November 22, 1956	Missoula, MT	Idaho	14–0
41	November 2, 1957	Moscow, ID	Idaho	31–13
42	November 8, 1958	Missoula, MT	Idaho	14–6
43	November 21, 1959	Moscow, ID	Idaho	9–6
44	October 1, 1960	Missoula, MT	Montana	18–14
45	November 18, 1961	Boise, ID	Idaho	16–14
46	October 6, 1962	Missoula, MT	Montana	22–16
47	October 23, 1965	Missoula, MT	Idaho	35–7

No.	Date	Location	Winner	Score
48	November 12, 1966	Moscow, ID	Idaho	40–6
49	October 14, 1967	Missoula, MT	Idaho	19–14
50	October 12, 1968	Moscow, ID	Idaho	56–45
51	October 11, 1969	Missoula, MT	Montana	34–9
52	October 10, 1970	Pullman, WA	Montana	44–26
53	October 2, 1971	Missoula, MT	Idaho	21–12
54	November 11, 1972	Moscow, ID	Idaho	31–17
55	November 3, 1973	Missoula, MT	Idaho	20–7
56	October 19, 1974	Moscow, ID	Tie	35–35
57	October 18, 1975	Missoula, MT	Montana	14–3
58	November 13, 1976	Moscow, ID	Idaho	28–19
59	October 15, 1977	Moscow, ID	Idaho	31–20
60	October 14, 1978	Missoula, MT	Idaho	34–30
61	October 20, 1979	Moscow, ID	Idaho	20–17
62	September 27, 1980	Missoula, MT	Idaho	42–0
63	October 10, 1981	Moscow, ID	Montana	16–14
64	October 16, 1982	Missoula, MT	Montana	40–16
65	November 27, 1982^{A}	Moscow, ID	#11 Idaho	21–7
66	October 22, 1983	Moscow, ID	Idaho	45–24
67	October 27, 1984	Missoula, MT	Idaho	40–39
68	October 19, 1985	Moscow, ID	#4 Idaho	38–0
69	November 1, 1986	Missoula, MT	Idaho	38–31
70	October 10, 1987	Moscow, ID	Idaho	31–25
71	September 24, 1988	Missoula, MT	#16 Montana	26–17
72	November 26, 1988^{A}	Moscow, ID	#1 Idaho	38–19
73	September 28, 1989	Moscow, ID	Idaho	30–24
74	November 10, 1990	Missoula, MT	#17 Idaho	35–14
75	November 16, 1991	Moscow, ID	Montana	35–34
76	November 7, 1992	Missoula, MT	Montana	47–29
77	November 6, 1993	Moscow, ID	Montana	54–34
78	October 29, 1994	Missoula, MT	Montana	45–21
79	October 21, 1995	Moscow, ID	Idaho	55–43
80	November 13, 1999	Missoula, MT	Idaho	33–30
81	September 9, 2000	Pullman, WA	#10 Montana	45–38
82	November 24, 2001	Missoula, MT	#1 Montana	33–27
83	October 5, 2002	Moscow, ID	#1 Montana	38–31
84	September 27, 2003	Missoula, MT	#9 Montana	41–28
85	November 10, 2018	Moscow, ID	Montana	46–27
86	November 9, 2019	Missoula, MT	#6 Montana	42–17
87	October 23, 2021	Moscow, ID	#11 Montana	34–14
88	October 15, 2022	Missoula, MT	Idaho	30–23
89	October 14, 2023	Moscow, ID	#10 Montana	23–21
90	September 27, 2025	Missoula, MT	#5 Montana	41–30
91	October 17, 2026	Missoula, MT	Idaho	42–35
Series: Idaho leads 57–32–2
^{A} Division I-AA playoff game

- Years not played: 1904–13, 1918, 1943–44, 1954, 1963–64, 1996–98, 2004–17, 2020, 2024

== Coaching records ==
Since 1945; Idaho led the first 29 meetings (through 1942) at 20–8–1 (.707)).

=== Idaho ===
Head coach	Team	Games	Seasons	Wins	Losses	Ties	Pct.
Babe Brown	Idaho	2	1945–46	1	1	0	.500
Dixie Howell	Idaho	4	1947–50	2	2	0	.500
Babe Curfman	Idaho	3	1951–53	3	0	0	1.000
Skip Stahley	Idaho	7	1954–61	6	1	0	.857
Dee Andros	Idaho	1	1962–64	0	1	0	.000
Steve Musseau	Idaho	3	1965–67	3	0	0	1.000
Y C McNease	Idaho	2	1968–69	1	1	0	.500
Don Robbins	Idaho	4	1970–73	3	1	0	.750
Ed Troxel	Idaho	4	1974–77	2	1	1	.625
Jerry Davitch	Idaho	4	1978–81	3	1	0	.750
Dennis Erickson (a)	Idaho	5	1982–85	4	1		.800
Keith Gilbertson	Idaho	4	1986–88	3	1		.750
John L. Smith	Idaho	6	1989–94	2	4		.333
Chris Tormey	Idaho	2	1995–99	2	0		1.000
Tom Cable	Idaho	4	2000–03	0	4		.000
Nick Holt	Idaho	0	2004–05				
Dennis Erickson (b)	Idaho	0	2006				
Robb Akey	Idaho	0	2007–12				
Paul Petrino	Idaho	3	2013–21	0	3		.000
Jason Eck	Idaho	2	2022–24	1	1		.500
Thomas Ford	Idaho	2	2025–26	1	1		.500
Total	Idaho	62	1945–2026	37	24	1	.605

=== Montana ===
Head coach	Team	Games	Seasons	Wins	Losses	Ties	Pct.
George Dahlberg	Montana	1	1945	0	1	0	.000
Doug Fessenden	Montana	3	1946–48	2	1	0	.667
Ted Shipkey	Montana	3	1949–51	1	2	0	.333
Ed Chinske	Montana	2	1952–54	0	2	0	.000
Jerry Williams	Montana	3	1955–57	0	3	0	.000
Ray Jenkins	Montana	5	1958–63	2	3	0	.400
Hugh Davidson	Montana	2	1964–66	0	2	0	.000
Jack Swarthout	Montana	9	1967–75	3	5	1	.389
Gene Carlson	Montana	4	1976–79	0	4	0	.000
Larry Donovan	Montana	7	1980–85	2	5		.286
Don Read	Montana	11	1986–95	5	6		.455
Mick Dennehy	Montana	1	1996–99	0	1		.000
Joe Glenn	Montana	3	2000–02	3	0		1.000
Bobby Hauck (a)	Montana	1	2003–09	1	0		1.000
Robin Pflugrad	Montana	0	2010–11				
Mick Delaney	Montana	0	2012–14				
Bob Stitt	Montana	0	2015–17				
Bobby Hauck (b)	Montana	6	2018–25	5	1		.833
Bobby Kennedy	Montana	1	2026	0	1		.000
Total	Montana	62	1945–2026	24	37	1	.395

- Last tie was in 1974 and the Big Sky enacted overtime for conference games in 1980; all Division I games went to overtime in 1996.
- Two games in 1982 and 1988; regular season at Montana and playoff (I-AA) at Idaho: home teams won all four games
- No games in 1954, 1963, 1964, 1996, 1997, 1998, 2004–2017, 2020, 2024

== See also ==
- List of NCAA college football rivalry games
