= EWU–UM Governors Cup =

American college football rivalry

- Eastern Washington Montana Grizzlies
- Sport: Football
- First meeting: September 24, 1938; 88 years ago Montana, 27–0
- Latest meeting: October 31, 2026; Montana, 42–33
- Next meeting: October 16, 2027
- Trophy: The Governors' Cup (since 1998)

Statistics
- Total meetings: 52
- All-time series: Montana leads, 33–18–1 (.630)
- Trophy series: Montana leads, 17–9 (.625)
- Largest victory: Montana, 63–7 (1995, 2022)
- Longest win streak: Montana, 5 (2021–present)
- Current win streak: Montana, 5 (2021–present)

Locations of Eastern Washington and Montana

The EWU–UM Governors Cup is the college football rivalry game between the University of Montana Grizzlies and the Eastern Washington University Eagles, both members of the Big Sky Conference in the Football Championship Subdivision (FCS).

== History ==
The Governors Cup is a very intense and heated rivalry, with the winner often the eventual conference champion. The original Governors Cup game was between EWU and University of Idaho Vandals until they left the Big Sky Conference in 1997.

Since 2009, the game has sold out and its winner has advanced to the FCS playoffs. It is usually played in the mid-season in October, alternating between Roos Field and Washington–Grizzly Stadium. In the 1980s and from 1998 to 2002, EWU hosted the Montana game at Spokane's Joe Albi Stadium.

Montana leads in the overall rivalry with 33 wins, 18 losses, and a tie. The first seven meetings were held before 1951; Montana was a member of the Pacific Coast Conference through the 1949 season. Of the first seven games, two were played in eastern Washington, both at night: the 1947 game was in Spokane at Gonzaga Stadium, which was soon deemed unsafe, and the 1950 game was in Cheney. The 1948 game was Eastern's only win in the early series, played in Great Falls. Following the 1950 game, the teams did not meet for three decades, renewing the series in 1980.

Eastern joined the NCAA in 1978 in Division II, moved up to Division I-AA in 1984, and joined the Big Sky in 1987. The only one tie was in 1984, when it was a non-conference contest; the Big Sky introduced overtime for conference games in 1980.

Montana broke Eastern's four-game winning streak in 2015 with a lopsided 57–16 victory in Missoula. Eastern won 35–16 in 2016 for their fifth straight win over the Griz on the red turf in Cheney.

The Governor's Cup debuted 42 years ago in 1984 and was originally between EWU and the University of Idaho Vandals of Moscow. Eastern pulled off a seven-point upset at Joe Albi Stadium in Spokane, with chief executives John Spellman and John Evans in attendance. Idaho's last year in the Big Sky was 1995 and the two played annually in mid-season through 1997; the non-conference series continued for two more years, in the season openers in early September. The game with Montana in October became the Governors Cup in 1998, and was played at Joe Albi.

As part of the scheduling of Big Sky Conference games, each school has traditionally played two opponents every year as a rival. Eastern's current rivals are Montana and Portland State, however, with the return of Idaho to the Big Sky Conference for football in 2018, that will change to the Vandals and Portland State, with Montana becoming Idaho's second rival. This change will begin in the 2018 season, meaning EWU will not play a regular season game versus Montana in 2018 for the first time since 1982, and the two teams will no longer be guaranteed to play each other on an annual basis.

== Game results ==
Eastern Washington victories	Montana victories	Tie games

No.	Date	Location	Winner	Score
1	September 24, 1938	Missoula, MT	Montana	27–0
2	September 28, 1940	Missoula, MT	Montana	9–0
3	October 5, 1946	Missoula, MT	Montana	31–7
4	September 20, 1947	Spokane, WA	Montana	21–0
5	September 18, 1948	Great Falls, MT	Eastern Washington	12–7
6	November 5, 1949	Missoula, MT	Montana	19–6
7	September 23, 1950	Cheney, WA	Montana	52–0
8	October 25, 1980	Missoula, MT	Montana	42–7
9	November 21, 1981	Spokane, WA	Eastern Washington	14–13
10	November 12, 1983	Spokane, WA	Eastern Washington	27–26
11	October 13, 1984	Missoula, MT	Tie	14–14
12	November 16, 1985	Spokane, WA	#13 Eastern Washington	52–19
13	October 4, 1986	Missoula, MT	Montana	42–37
14	November 14, 1987	Spokane, WA	Montana	22–3
15	October 8, 1988	Missoula, MT	#13 Montana	30–6
16	September 23, 1989	Spokane, WA	Montana	22–16
17	September 29, 1990	Missoula, MT	#20 Eastern Washington	36–35
18	October 26, 1991	Cheney, WA	Eastern Washington	20–17
19	October 17, 1992	Missoula, MT	Eastern Washington	27–21
20	October 16, 1993	Cheney, WA	#16 Montana	35–20
21	October 8, 1994	Missoula, MT	#3 Montana	49–29
22	October 14, 1995	Cheney, WA	#9 Montana	63–7
23	October 19, 1996	Cheney, WA	#2 Montana	34–30
24	October 18, 1997	Missoula, MT	Eastern Washington	40–35
25	October 24, 1998	Spokane, WA	Montana	30–27
26	October 23, 1999	Missoula, MT	#4 Montana	25–7
27	September 30, 2000	Spokane, WA	#9 Montana	41–31

No.	Date	Location	Winner	Score
28	September 29, 2001	Missoula, MT	#3 Montana	29–26
29	November 16, 2002	Spokane, WA	Eastern Washington	30–21
30	November 15, 2003	Missoula, MT	#5 Montana	41–10
31	October 16, 2004	Cheney, WA	#5 Montana	31–28
32	October 15, 2005	Missoula, MT	#12 Eastern Washington	34–20
33	October 7, 2006	Cheney, WA	#4 Montana	33–17
34	October 6, 2007	Missoula, MT	#1 Montana	24–23
35	October 11, 2008	Cheney, WA	#12 Montana	19–3
36	October 17, 2009	Missoula, MT	#3 Montana	41–34
37	September 18, 2010	Cheney, WA	#18 Eastern Washington	36–27
38	September 17, 2011	Missoula, MT	#12 Montana	17–14
39	September 29, 2012	Cheney, WA	#21 Eastern Washington	32–26
40	October 26, 2013	Missoula, MT	#3 Eastern Washington	42–37
41	November 8, 2014	Cheney, WA	#5 Eastern Washington	36–26
42	December 6, 2014^	Cheney, WA	#4 Eastern Washington	37–20
43	November 14, 2015	Missoula, MT	#22 Montana	57–16
44	October 29, 2016	Cheney, WA	#3 Eastern Washington	35–16
45	September 23, 2017	Missoula, MT	#11 Eastern Washington	48–41
46	October 26, 2019	Missoula, MT	#10 Montana	34–17
47	October 2, 2021	Cheney, WA	#6 Eastern Washington	34–28
48	December 3, 2021^	Missoula, MT	#5 Montana	57–41
49	November 12, 2022	Missoula, MT	#16 Montana	63–7
50	September 28, 2024	Cheney, WA	#8 Montana	52–49
51	November 8, 2025	Missoula, MT	#2 Montana	29–24
52	October 31, 2026	Cheney, WA	#14 Montana	42–33
Series: Montana leads 33–18–1
^{^}FCS postseason games; the Governors Cup was not at stake. First game designated as Governors Cup was in 1998

== Coaching records ==
Since 1980

=== Eastern Washington ===
Head coach	Team	Games	Seasons	Wins	Losses	Ties	Pct.
Dick Zornes	EWU	13	1979–1993	6	6	1	.500
Mike Kramer	EWU	6	1994–1999	1	5		.167
Paul Wulff	EWU	8	2000–2007	2	6		.250
Beau Baldwin	EWU	10	2008–2016	6	4		.600
Aaron Best	EWU	8	2017–2026	2	6		.250

=== Montana ===
Head coach	Team	Games	Seasons	Wins	Losses	Ties	Pct.
Larry Donovan	Montana	5	1980–1985	1	3	1	.300
Don Read	Montana	10	1986–1995	7	3		.700
Mick Dennehy	Montana	4	1996–1999	3	1		.750
Joe Glenn	Montana	3	2000–2002	2	1		.667
Bobby Hauck (a)	Montana	7	2003–2009	6	1		.857
Robin Pflugrad	Montana	2	2010–2012	1	1		.500
Mick Delaney	Montana	4	2012–2014	0	4		.000
Bob Stitt	Montana	3	2015–2017	1	2		.333
Bobby Hauck (b)	Montana	6	2018–2025	5	1		.833
Bobby Kennedy	Montana	1	2026	1	0		1.000

- Only tie was in 1984; Big Sky enacted overtime for conference games in 1980; all Division I games went to overtime in 1996.
- Two games in 2014, regular season and FCS playoffs, both in Cheney and both won by Eastern
- Not played: 1982, 2018, 2020, 2023
- Eastern started conference play in 1987, and first Governors Cup against Montana was in 1998

== Stadiums ==
=== Roos Field ===
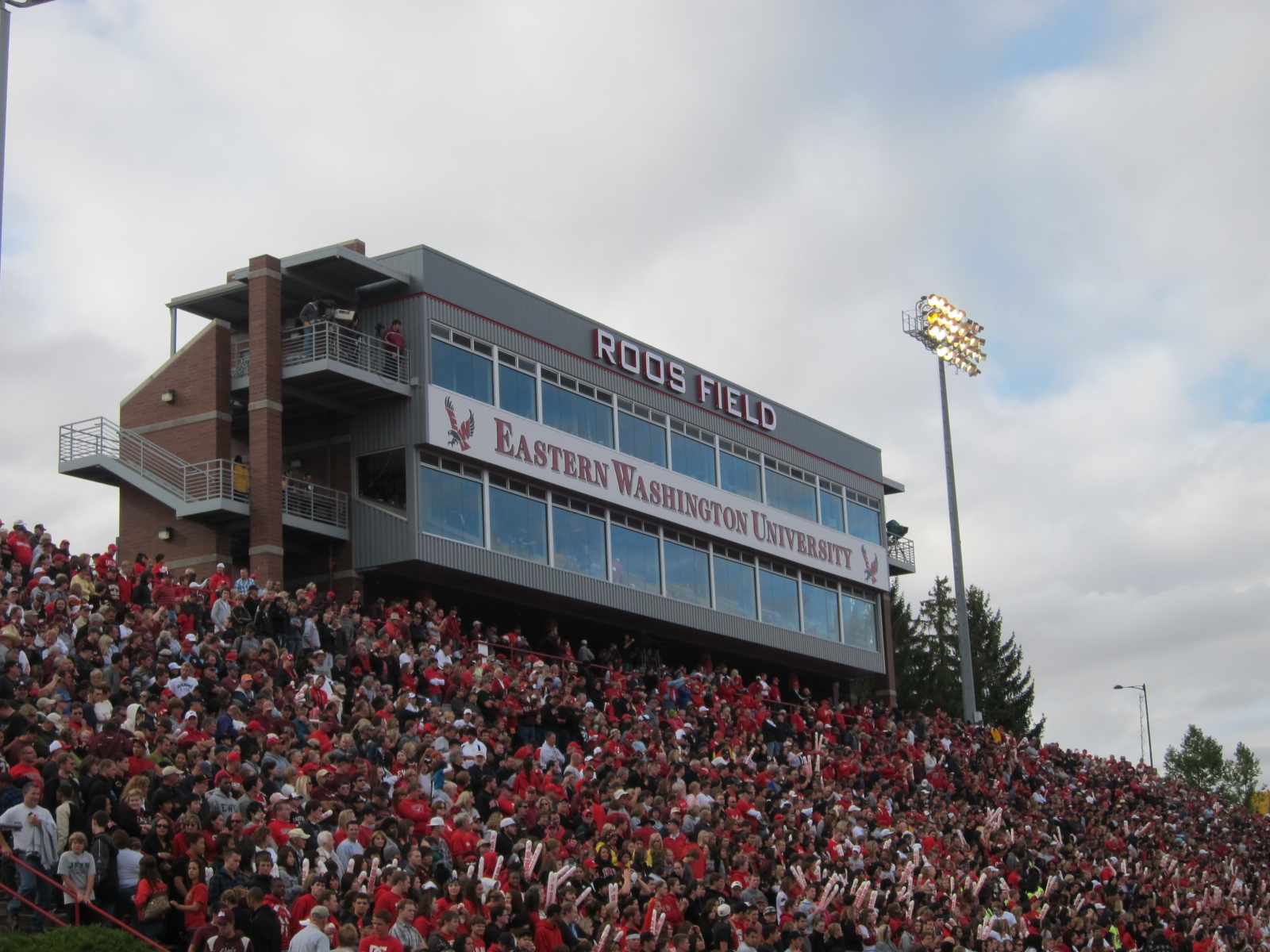
Governors Cup sell-out (12,000) at newly renamed Roos Field in September 2010

With more than 2,000 bleacher seats added, record crowds of 11,702 in 2010 and 11,583 in 2006 attended the showdowns with Montana, the most recent match up in 2010 was won by the Eagles. The previous record before 2004 was 6,879 for the Eastern – Idaho game on October 17, 1992, when temporary bleachers were employed in addition to the 5,000 permanent seats. The top 25 attendances at Roos Field have come since the early 1990s, including the top eight in the last three seasons.

In February 2010, Eastern Washington announced its plans to remove the natural turf at Woodward Field and replace it with red SprinTurf, making it the second Division I college football program to have a non-green playing surface (Boise State changed to a blue surface in 1986.) On May 20, the university's board of trustees approved a name change to Roos Field, upon the successful completion of the project. All-pro offensive tackle Michael Roos donated a half million dollars to the project; a three-year starter for the Eagles, he was a second round selection in the 2005 NFL draft.

=== Washington–Grizzly Stadium ===
The stadium is named after construction magnate Dennis Washington, a Montana business pioneer who donated $1 million to finance its construction in 1985. The stadium has been expanded three times since its opening in 1986, most recently in 2008 with an upper deck expansion of 2,000 seats on the east side.

The original capacity in 1986 was 12,500 permanent seats on the sidelines with open grass seating behind the end zones, an approximate capacity of 15,000. Permanent seating for the end zones increased the seating capacity to over 19,000 in 1995, and a 2008 expansion pushed it over 25,000.

Eastern's first game at the stadium was in 1988; previous games were at Dornblaser Field.

== See also ==
- List of NCAA college football rivalry games
