= Chase Reynolds =

American football player (born 1987)

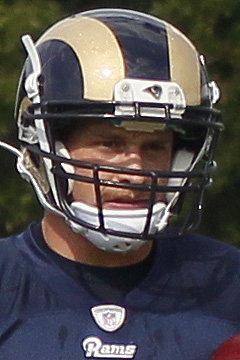
- Reynolds with the St. Louis Rams in 2013

No. 34
- Position: Running back / Special teamer

Personal information
- Born: October 22, 1987 (age 39); Drummond, Montana, U.S.
- Listed height: 6 ft 0 in (1.83 m)
- Listed weight: 205 lb (93 kg)

Career information
- High school: Drummond
- College: Montana (2006–2010)
- NFL draft: 2011: undrafted

Career history
- Seattle Seahawks (2011)*; St. Louis / Los Angeles Rams (2011–2016)
- * Offseason or practice squad member only

Awards and highlights
- 2× First-team All-Big Sky (2009, 2010); Second-team All-Big Sky (2008)

Career NFL statistics
- Total tackles: 37
- Receptions: 1
- Receiving yards: 4
- Stats at Pro Football Reference

Chase Reynolds (born October 22, 1987) is an American former professional football player who was a running back and special teamer in the National Football League (NFL). He was signed by the Seattle Seahawks as an undrafted free agent in 2011. He played college football for the Montana Grizzlies.

== Early life ==
Reynolds was one of the most prolific running backs in the state of Montana for his years spent at Drummond High School. During his four years at Drummond, he set a Montana prep record with 5,261 career rushing yards, and scoring 114 touchdowns in his 44-game career. He also averaged 10.1 yards per carry throughout his high school career. He was a four-time All-State selection, three-time MVP of the team, and a four-year letterer. His football team won three straight Class “C” championships, going a perfect 35–0 under Jim Oberweiser.

Aside from his football stardom, Reynolds also was a four-year letterer in basketball, and track. He was also an all-conference pick in basketball, and a three-time pick in track.

== College career ==
Reynolds committed to play for Bobby Hauck and his Montana Grizzlies in 2006 being redshirted for his freshman season.

Coming out his next season as a redshirt freshman, Reynolds was moved to the wide receiver position. He played in 11 games on the special teams, not recording any receptions.

Reynolds was moved back to the running back position in 2008, earning the starting job for the season. The move proved to be a success, as he rushed for a school single-season record of 22 touchdowns and carried the ball 281 times, racking up 1,583 yards, which ranked him third in the University of Montana's single-season history. He was a second-team All-Big Sky selection and named honorable mention All-American by the Sports Network.

In the 2009 season, Reynolds rushed for 1,501 yards, and again scored 22 rushing touchdowns, tying his record from last season. He was a finalist for the Walter Payton Award (FCS offensive MVP), finishing 12th out of the 23 players on the ballot. He was named a second-team All-American by the Associated Press and The Sports Network, as well as named to the College Sporting News’ “Fab 50.” He was a first-team All-Big Sky selection.

Reynolds led the Big Sky his senior season with seven 100-yard rushing games, including a career-high 241 yards (the second most in single-game history) against Weber State. He set a school record with 321 rushing attempts. His 144 points last season broke the record of 138 that he had set the previous season. He also set a Grizzly record by scoring 24 total touchdowns, surpassing the mark of 23 he had set the year before. He was again a first-team All-Big Sky selection.

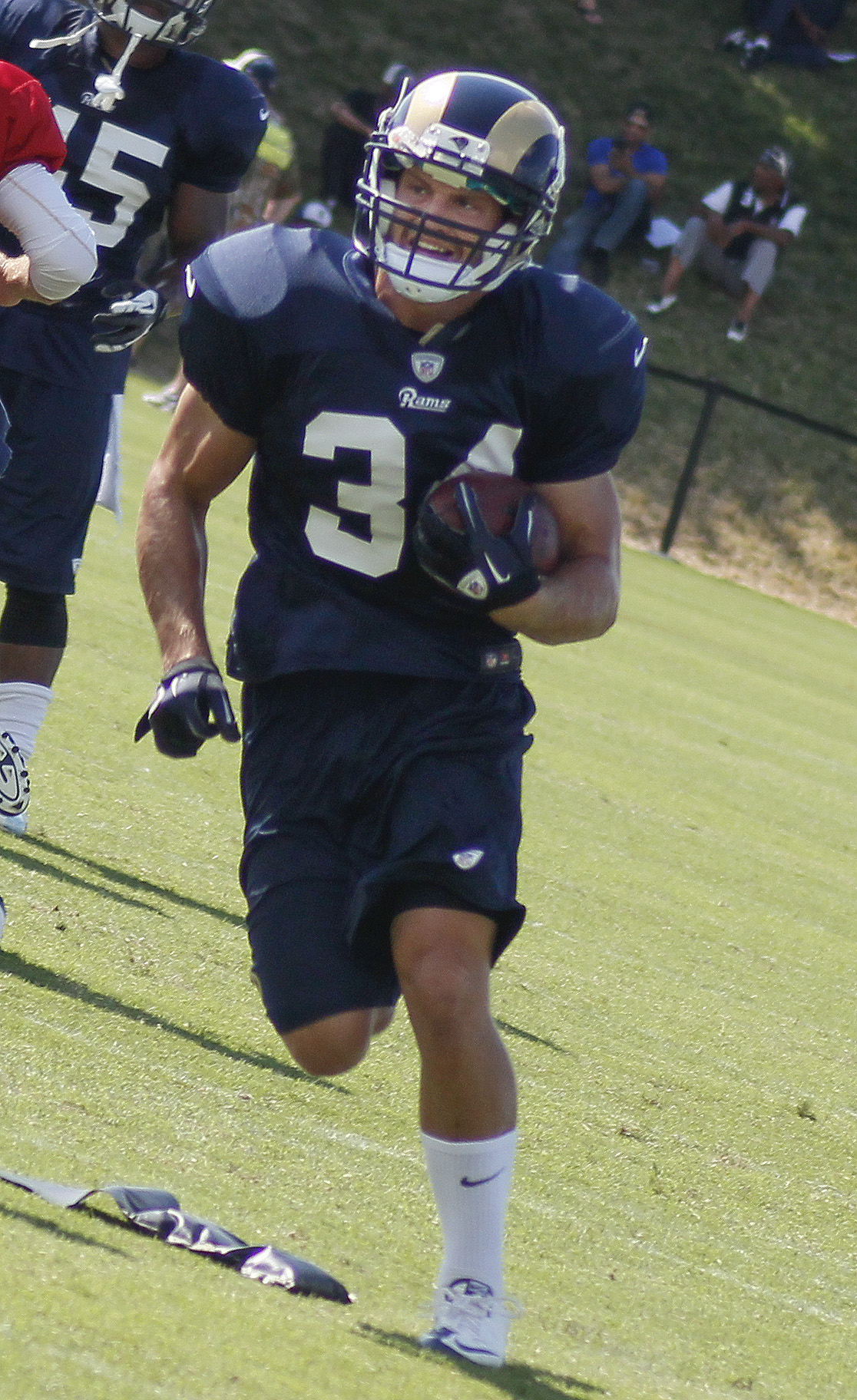
Reyonolds during Rams Training Camp 2013.

== Professional career ==
Pre-draft measurables
Height	Weight	40-yard dash	10-yard split	20-yard split	20-yard shuttle	Three-cone drill	Vertical jump	Broad jump	Bench press	Wonderlic
5 ft 11 in (1.80 m)	201 lb (91 kg)	4.58 s	1.66 s	2.73 s	4.25 s	6.76 s	36 in (0.91 m)	9 ft 6 in (2.90 m)	8 reps	x
Values from Montana Pro Day

=== Seattle Seahawks ===
After going undrafted in the 2011 NFL draft, Reynolds was signed to a three-year contract by the Seattle Seahawks as an undrafted free agent on August 2, 2011. In his first professional appearance during the 2011 NFL Preseason on August 11, 2011, Reynolds rushed for 8 yards on 6 carries against the San Diego Chargers. He was waived on August 14, 2011.

=== St. Louis / Los Angeles Rams ===
On August 17, 2011, Reynolds signed a contract with the NFL's St. Louis Rams. On September 1, 2011, in the final preseason game for St. Louis, Reynolds caught a 17-yard pass, rushed 8 times for 16 yards, also scoring his first NFL rushing touchdown. Reynolds was waived for final cuts on September 3, 2011. Reynolds was re-signed to the team's practice squad on September 4, 2011. On October 9, 2011, Reynolds was, again, released from the practice squad. Then signed to Rams full-time team. Reynolds played on the practice squad in 2012. In 2013, Reynolds made the Rams active roster and was a standout special teams player. During the 2014 season, Chase led special teams in tackles with 16. He was tied for fifth in the NFL.

== Personal life ==
Reynolds is married to Kila Reynolds, winner of Mrs. Montana 2011. They welcomed their first child, a son named Talen, during Chase's senior year in high school. During Chase's red shirt senior year, the couple had a daughter, Peyton. At the end of the 2014 season they had their second daughter, Tenley.
