= Tim Hauck =

American football player and coach (born 1966)

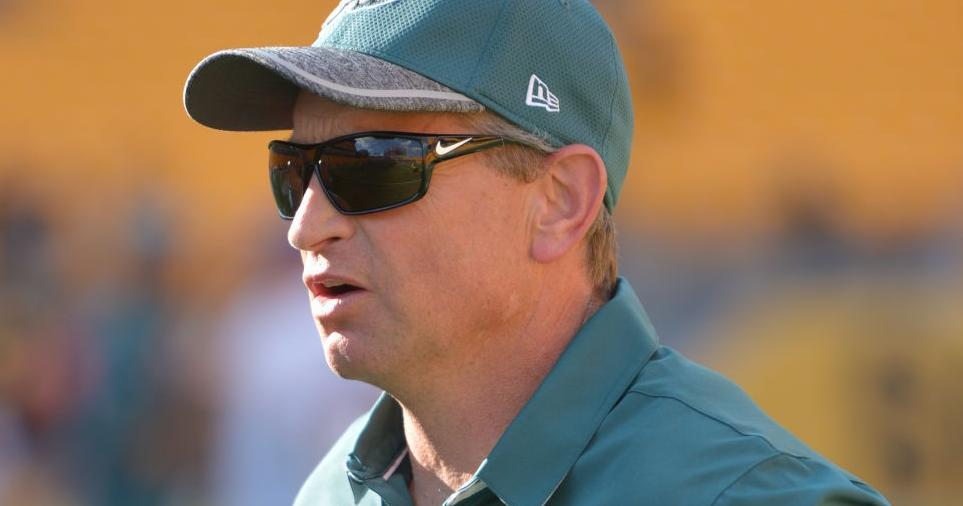

Montana Grizzlies
- Title: Co-defensive coordinator & safeties coach

Personal information
- Born: December 20, 1966 (age 59); Butte, Montana, U.S.
- Listed height: 5 ft 10 in (1.78 m)
- Listed weight: 187 lb (85 kg)

Career information
- Position: Defensive back (No. 40, 24, 37, 26, 45)
- High school: Sweet Grass County (Big Timber, Montana)
- College: Pacific (OR); Montana
- NFL draft: 1990: undrafted

Career history

Playing
- New England Patriots (1990); Green Bay Packers (1991–1994); Denver Broncos (1995–1996); Seattle Seahawks (1997); Indianapolis Colts (1998); Philadelphia Eagles (1999–2002); San Francisco 49ers (2002)

Coaching
- Montana (2004−2006) Safeties coach; Montana (2007) Secondary coach; UCLA (2008) Safeties coach; Tennessee Titans (2009–2010) Assistant secondary coach; Cleveland Browns (2012) Defensive backs coach; UNLV (2013−2014) Defensive coordinator/cornerbacks coach; Philadelphia Eagles (2016−2020) Safeties coach; Montana (2023) Defensive analyst; Montana (2024–present) Co-defensive coordinator & safeties coach

Awards and highlights
- As coach: Super Bowl champion (LII)

Career NFL statistics
- Tackles: 316
- Forced fumbles: 4
- Fumble recoveries: 5
- Passes defended: 6
- Interceptions: 1
- Stats at Pro Football Reference

Timothy Christian Hauck (born December 20, 1966) is an American former coach and former player. He is the co-defensive coordinator and safeties coach at his alma mater, the University of Montana. Hauck played professionally as a safety in the National Football League (NFL) for 13 seasons, from 1990 to 2002, with seven different teams: the New England Patriots, the Green Bay Packers, the Denver Broncos, the Seattle Seahawks, the Indianapolis Colts, the Philadelphia Eagles and the San Francisco 49ers.

== Playing career ==
Hauck is the son of a former Big Timber high school coach. He first played college football at Pacific University in Forest Grove, Oregon, where he earned all-conference honors. Hauck then transferred to the University of Montana, where he was named defensive MVP in the Big Sky Conference in consecutive seasons, 1988 and 1989.

After his senior year at Montana, he declared for the 1990 NFL draft going undrafted, though he later signed with the New England Patriots that same year. He spent one season with the Patriots. In 1999 with the Philadelphia Eagles, Hauck replaced Mike Zordich as the starting strong-side safety, forming a tandem with Brian Dawkins. In 2000, Hauck was replaced by Damon Moore, but he remained with the Eagles as a reserve safety until the end of the 2001 season.

== Coaching career ==
Hauck worked coaching the defensive secondary for the University of Montana. In 2008, he was hired by the UCLA to coach the team's defensive secondary. In 2009, Hauck went to the NFL's Tennessee Titans to coach their defensive secondary.

On January 23, 2012, the Cleveland Browns announced the hiring of Hauck as the team's defensive backs coach. On February 13, 2013, UNLV announced the hiring of Hauck as the team's new defensive coordinator and cornerbacks coach under his brother, head coach Bobby Hauck. He was hired by the Eagles as the team's safeties coach on January 20, 2016. Hauck won his first Super Bowl ring when the Eagles defeated the New England Patriots in Super Bowl LII.
