= Drew Miller (quarterback) =

American gridiron football player (born 1978)

No. 7
- Position: Quarterback

Personal information
- Born: March 14, 1978 (age 48); Tacoma, Washington, U.S.
- Listed height: 6 ft 2 in (1.88 m)
- Listed weight: 200 lb (91 kg)

Career information
- High school: Lakes (Lakewood, Washington)
- College: BYU (1997–1998); Montana (1999–2000)
- NFL draft: 2001: undrafted

Career history
- BC Lions (2001)*; Detroit Fury (2002)
- * Offseason or practice squad member only

Career AFL statistics
- Comp. / Att.: 39 / 62
- Passing yards: 473
- TD–INT: 9–4
- Passer rating: 95.70
- Stats at ArenaFan.com

Drew Miller (born March 14, 1978) is an American former football quarterback. He played college football at Brigham Young University and the University of Montana. He played professionally for the Detroit Fury of the Arena Football League (AFL).

== Early life ==
Miller played high school football and baseball at Lakes High School in Lakewood, Washington. He started three seasons at quarterback while also playing the role of kicker and punter. As a senior, he threw for 3,366 yards with 42 touchdowns, while earning the Player of the Year award. He recorded career totals of 9,003 passing yards and 103 touchdowns. Miller also earned various honors, including first-team All-State, first-team All-Conference three times, and first-team All-American during his senior year. He helped his baseball team end a 15-year playoff drought.

== College career ==
Miller played for the BYU Cougars from 1997 to 1998. He was the first true freshman in the school's history to start at quarterback. He transferred to play for the Montana Grizzlies from 1999 to 2000. Miller was named the 1999 Big Sky Conference Newcomer of the Year. He was also named first-team All-Big Sky as well as first-team All-American in 1999 and 2000. He played 22 games during his collegiate career for the Cougars and Grizzlies, completing 530 of his 812 passes for 7,211 yards and 52 touchdowns.

== Professional career ==
Miller signed with the BC Lions of the Canadian Football League on April 26, 2001. He was released by the Lions in June 2001. He played for the AFL's Detroit Fury during the 2002 Arena Football League season.

== Coaching career ==
Miller began his coaching career as an assistant for the University of Montana for one season. He then became the quarterbacks coach at Lakes High School and the offensive coordinator at Bellarmine Preparatory School. He then became the wide receivers coach at Central Washington University for three seasons. Miller then became the wide receivers and kick returners coach for Idaho State University.
