= Robert H. Cary =

American football player and coach (1885–1912)

Biographical details
- Born: December 15, 1885; Peoria, Illinois, U.S.
- Died: September 19, 1912 (aged 26); Missoula, Montana, U.S.
- Education: Yale (Ph.B. 1909)

Playing career
- 1904–1905: Montana

Coaching career (HC unless noted)
- 1910–1911: Montana

Administrative career (AD unless noted)
- 1910–1912: Montana

Head coaching record
- Overall: 5–3–1

Robert Hart Cary (December 15, 1885 – September 19, 1912) was an American college football player and coach. He was a 1909 graduate of Yale University, where he received his Ph.B. Cary served as the head football coach at the University of Montana from 1910 to 1911, compiling a record of 5–3–1.

Cary died from diabetes, on September 19, 1912, in Missoula, Montana.

== Head coaching record ==
Year	Team	Overall	Conference	Standing	Bowl/playoffs
Montana (Independent) (1910–1911)
1910	Montana	3–2–1			
1911	Montana	2–1			
Montana:		5–3–1			
Total:		5–3–1			
