= A. George Heilman =

American football player, athletics coach, and medical doctor

Biographical details
- Born: May 27, 1886; Lebanon County, Pennsylvania, U.S.
- Died: August 12, 1943 (aged 57); Washington, D.C., U.S.

Playing career

Football
- 1904–1907: Franklin & Marshall
- 1908–1912: Penn

Basketball
- 1904–1908: Franklin & Marshall
- 1908–1909: Penn
- 1911–1912: Penn

Coaching career (HC unless noted)

Football
- 1913–1914: Montana

Track
- 1914: Montana

Head coaching record
- Overall: 9–4–1 (football)

Accomplishments and honors

Championships
- National (1908)

Adam George Heilman (May 27, 1886 – August 12, 1943) was an American college football player and coach, college basketball player, college track coach, and medical doctor. He served as the head football coach at the University of Montana from 1913 to 1914, compiling a record of 9–4–1.

== Head coaching record ==
=== Football ===
| Year | Team | Overall | Conference | Standing | Bowl/playoffs |
|---|---|---|---|---|---|
Montana Grizzlies (Independent) (1913–1914)
| 1913 | Montana | 2–4 | | | |
| 1914 | Montana | 7–0–1 | | | |
| Montana: | | 9–4–1 | | | |
| Total: | | 9–4–1 | | | |
