= Dewitt Peck (American football) =

American football coach (1880–1954)

DeWitt Peck
Biographical details
- Born: April 26, 1880; Iowa, U.S.
- Died: December 9, 1954 (aged 74); Paradise, California, U.S.
- Education: Iowa State

Coaching career (HC unless noted)
- 1902: Montana

Head coaching record
- Overall: 0–3

DeWitt Clinton Peck (April 26, 1880 – December 9, 1954) was an American college football coach. He served as the head football coach at the University of Montana in 1902, compiling a record of 0–3.

== Head coaching record ==
Year	Team	Overall	Conference	Standing	Bowl/playoffs
Montana (Independent) (1902)
1902	Montana	0–3			
Montana:		0–3			
Total:		0–3			
