= Bobby Kennedy (American football) =

American football coach

Current position
- Title: Head coach
- Team: Montana
- Conference: Big Sky
- Record: 5–3

Biographical details
- Born: December 13, 1966 (age 59); Denver, Colorado, U.S.
- Education: University of Northern Colorado (B.S., 1989)

Playing career
- 1985–1988: Northern Colorado
- Positions: Quarterback, tight end

Coaching career (HC unless noted)
- 1990–1991: Illinois (GA)
- 1992: Penn State (GA)
- 1993–1994: Wyoming (WR)
- 1995–1998: Wake Forest (WR)
- 1999–2000: Wake Forest (RB)
- 2001: Arizona (RB)
- 2002–2003: Washington (RB)
- 2004–2010: Texas (WR)
- 2011–2012: Colorado (WR)
- 2013–2016: Iowa (WR)
- 2018–2022: Stanford (WR)
- 2024: Rice (WR)
- 2025: Montana (WR)
- 2026–present: Montana

Head coaching record
- Overall: 5–3

Robert John Kennedy (born December 13, 1966) is an American college football coach. He is the head football coach at the University of Montana, a position he has held since 2026. He played college football as a quarterback at the University of Northern Colorado from 1985 to 1988.

== Head coaching record ==
Year	Team	Overall	Conference	Standing	Bowl/playoffs	TSN/STATS^{#}	Coaches^{°}
Montana Grizzlies (Big Sky Conference) (2026–present)
2026	Montana	5–3	3–2				
Montana:		5–3	3–2				
Total:		5–3					
