= Robin Pflugrad =

American football player and coach (born 1958)

Biographical details
- Born: November 29, 1958 (age 67); Eugene, Oregon, U.S.

Playing career
- 1979: Portland State
- Position: Wide receiver

Coaching career (HC unless noted)
- 1980: Portland State (assistant)
- 1981: South Eugene HS (OR) (assistant)
- 1982–1985: Portland State (assistant)
- 1986–1990: Montana (assistant)
- 1991–1994: Montana (AHC)
- 1995–2000: Arizona State (WR/RC)
- 2001–2005: Washington State (TE/RC/AHC)
- 2006–2008: Oregon (WR)
- 2009: Montana (WR)
- 2010–2011: Montana
- 2013: Weber State (OC/RB)
- 2015–2016: Phoenix (OC)
- 2017: Phoenix
- 2018–2022: Northern Arizona (AHC/TE)

Head coaching record
- Overall: 13–7 (college); 3–7 (junior college)

Accomplishments and honors

Championships
- 1 Big Sky (2011)

Awards
- Big Sky Coach of the Year (2011)

Robin Pflugrad (born November 29, 1958) is a retired American football coach. He was most recently the assistant head coach and tight ends coach at Northern Arizona University. He was the head coach for the University of Montana from 2010 to 2011 and the offensive coordinator at Weber State University in 2013. Pflugrad previously held assistant coaching positions at Montana, Oregon, Washington State, Arizona State, and Portland State.

During the 2014 football season he worked as a college football analyst for KPHO-TV, the CBS affiliate in Phoenix, and as a football columnist for Cougfan.com, the Scout.com network affiliate covering Washington State University. Pflugrad also operates Pflugrad Athletic Consulting, offering administrative and strategic insights to high school and college athletic programs in the Southwest region.

== Biography ==
=== Early life and coaching career ===
Pflugrad was born in 1958 in Eugene, Oregon, where he later attended North Eugene High School. His father Roy Pflugrad had been a player/coach for the Portland Indians, which won the Pacific Coast Professional Basketball League title in 1948. He went to college at Portland State University, where he played football as a wide receiver, earned all-academic recognition, and served as the team captain during his senior year in 1979. Pflugrad's first coaching experience came the following year as an assistant on the staff at his alma mater. In 1981, Pflugrad coached at South Eugene High School, before he returned to Portland State to serve as an assistant coach from 1982 to 1985 under head coach Don Read. Pflugrad then followed Read to Montana, where he worked as an assistant coach with the team's wide receivers, quarterbacks, and running backs.

=== Assistant coach in the Pac-10 Conference ===
From 1995 to 2000, Pflugrad was the wide receivers coach and recruiting coordinator at Arizona State under head coach Bruce Snyder. The 1996 Sun Devils won the Pac-10 conference title and finished the season 11-1. From 2001 to 2005, he served as the tight ends coach, assistant head coach, and recruiting coordinator at Washington State. Washington State posted three straight 10-win seasons while he was on staff, and WSU head coach Bill Doba dubbed Pflugrad "The Bulldog" for his diligence in recruiting student-athletes to the university In 2002, Pflugrad was reportedly interested in the Montana head coaching job, but that went to Bobby Hauck instead. During that time period, he was offered a position on the Alabama staff by new head coach Mike Price, but remained at Washington State. After the 2005 season, Pflugrad joined head coach Mike Bellotti's staff at Oregon in a move driven in part by the desire to be closer to his and his wife's four elderly parents. He coached the wide receivers there from 2006 to 2008, including his own son, Aaron Pflugrad who was a freshman in 2007. In the spring of 2006, he had spinal surgery to replace three degenerative vertebrae. Over the course of his career he has coached approximately two-dozen All-Americans and/or future NFL players.

=== Montana ===
In 2009, Pflugrad returned to Montana to become the wide receivers coach under Bobby Hauck. After that season, Hauck left Montana to become the head coach at UNLV, and Pflugrad was promoted to replace him. ESPN reported that Pflugrad was selected over two other former Montana assistants who were considered candidates for the job: Brent Pease, a former Montana quarterback and Boise State receivers coach, and Dave Doeren, Wisconsin defensive coordinator. Pflugrad said after his hiring that Montana would be "very fast on offense, up-tempo and upbeat." In his two seasons as head coach Pflugrad guided the Grizzlies to an 18-7 record. In 2011, he led the Grizzlies to an 11-3 record, capturing the Big Sky Championship and advancing to the semifinals of the FCS playoffs. The 2011 Big Sky Championship and the subsequent playoff wins were vacated due to NCAA violations. Despite this he was named a semi-finalist for the Eddie Robinson Award as the nation's top FCS coach.

On March 29, 2012, Pflugrad was informed that his contract would not be renewed, and he would no longer be head coach at the University of Montana. Although no reason was given by the university's president, Royce Engstrom, for Pflugrad's termination it was believed to have stemmed from off-field incidents involving certain members of the Montana football team. Pflugrad, known in coaching circles for his clean-cut approach, was shocked by his dismissal, and defenders pointed to team lectures on drugs, alcohol and behavior and his crackdown on a decades-long player initiation ritual as examples of his button-downed philosophy. When Pflugrad returned to Missoula as an opposing coach for the Montana vs. Weber State game in November 2013, he spoke openly about his love for the team he left behind and what he believed were political machinations that cost him the head job there. Following the dismissal at Montana, Engstrom, the university president, gave Pflugrad a letter of recommendation that touts his coaching ability and personality and says Pflugrad's removal "was not the result of any specific impropriety or improper conduct by him." In addition, Peggy Kuhr, an interim vice president at the University of Montana later told The Oregonian newspaper, "Coach Pflugrad is a good and decent person who tried to do things the right way. I applaud him for it."

=== Assistant coach ===
In February 2013, Weber State hired Pflugrad as the team's offensive coordinator. He was not retained when head coach Jody Sears was fired the next year.

In April 2015, Pflugrad was hired as offensive coordinator for Phoenix College, under Dan Cozzetto.

=== Personal life ===
He and his wife Marlene have two grown children: Amanda Pflugrad, who worked in media for the New York Jets (and now the Boston Celtics), and son Aaron Pflugrad, who is a college assistant football coach.

== Head coaching record ==
=== College ===
Year	Team	Overall	Conference	Standing	Bowl/playoffs	TSN^{#}	Coaches^{°}
Montana Grizzlies (Big Sky Conference) (2010–2011)
2010	Montana	7–4	5–3	T–3rd		20	21
2011	Montana	6–3 (Note: Does not include 5 total wins and 2 conference wins during 2011 season which were vacated by the NCAA in 2013. The 2011 team's on-field conference record was 7–1 and overall record was 11–3.)	5–1	T–1st	L NCAA Division I Semifinal	5	5
Montana:		13–7	10–4				
Total:		13–7					
National championship Conference title Conference division title or championship game berth

=== Junior college ===
Year	Team	Overall	Conference	Standing	Bowl/playoffs
Phoenix Bears (Western States Football League) (2017)
2017	Phoenix	3–7	2–5	T–6th	
Phoenix:		3–7	2–5		
Total:		3–7			
