= Wallace Philoon =

United States Army general

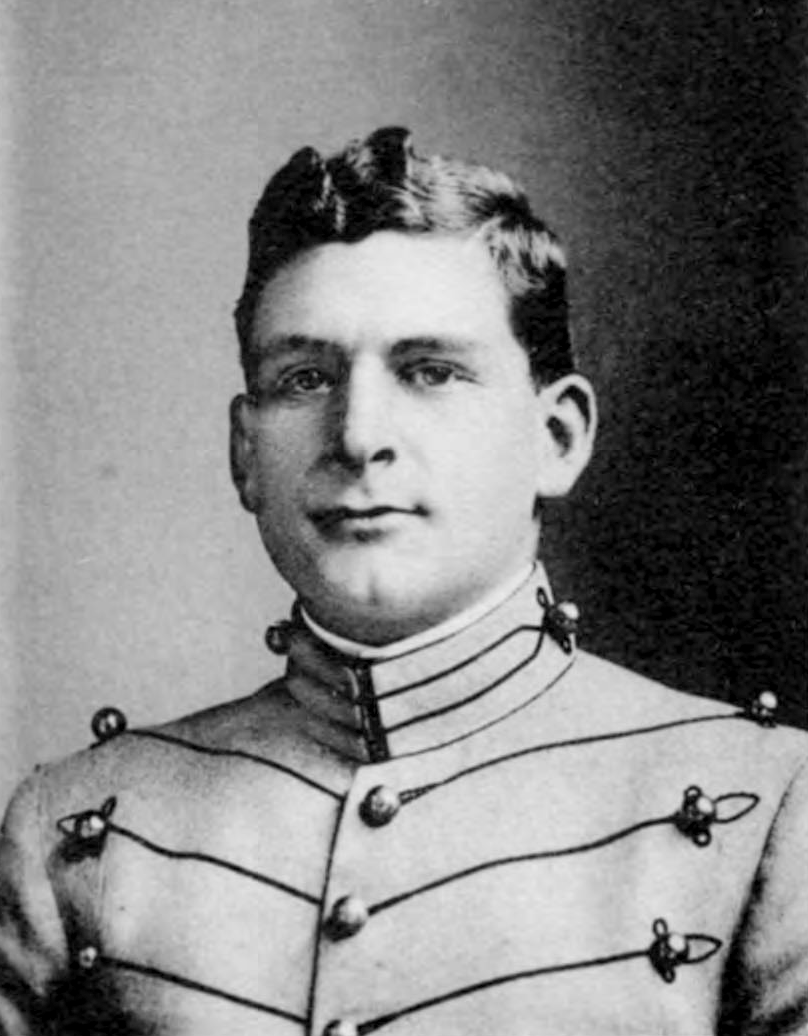

Biographical details
- Born: October 13, 1883; Auburn, Maine, U.S.
- Died: January 16, 1970 (aged 86); Portland, Maine, U.S.

Playing career
- c. 1904: Bowdoin
- 1906–1908: Army
- Position: Center

Coaching career (HC unless noted)
- 1912: Montana

Head coaching record
- Overall: 4–3

Accomplishments and honors

Awards
- Second-team All-American (1908)

Wallace Copeland Philoon (October 13, 1883 – January 16, 1970) was an American college football player and coach and a major general in the United States Army.

== Biography ==
A native of Auburn, Maine, Philoon attended Bowdoin College, where he played college football and graduated in 1905. He then enrolled in the United States Military Academy, playing at the center position for the Army Black Knights football team. He was selected in 1908 as a first-team All-American by the Washington Herald (selected by William Peel), the Chicago Inter-Ocean and Fred Crolius. He was also named a second-team All-American by Walter Camp.

After graduating from the United States Military Academy in 1909, alongside future general officers such as George S. Patton, William Hood Simpson, Jacob L. Devers and Robert L. Eichelberger, Philoon served as an officer in the United States Army. From 1942 to 1944, Philoon commanded the Army's training center at Fort McClellan, Alabama, where 200,000 infantry replacement troops were trained for World War II.

== Head coaching record ==
Year	Team	Overall	Conference	Standing	Bowl/playoffs
Montana Grizzlies (Independent) (1912)
1912	Montana	4–3			
Montana:		4–3			
Total:		4–3			
