= Gene Carlson =

American football and baseball player and coach (1932–2009)

Biographical details
- Born: February 20, 1932; Fort Benton, Montana, U.S.
- Died: June 1, 2009 (aged 77); Pasco, Washington, U.S.

Playing career

Football
- 1949–1952: Montana

Baseball
- 1950–1953: Montana
- 1953: Boise Yankees
- 1954: Modesto Reds
- 1957: Peoria Chiefs
- 1957: Missoula Timberjacks

Coaching career (HC unless noted)

Football
- 1958–1972: Great Falls HS (MT)
- 1973–1975: Montana (assistant)
- 1976–1979: Montana

Head coaching record
- Overall: 16–25 (college)

Loyal Eugene Carlson (February 20, 1932 – June 1, 2009) was an American football and baseball player and coach. He served as the head football coach at his alma mater, the University of Montana in Missoula, from 1976 to 1979.

== Head coaching record ==
=== College ===
Year	Team	Overall	Conference	Standing	Bowl/playoffs
Montana Grizzlies (Big Sky Conference) (1976–1979)
1976	Montana	4–6	3–3	4th	
1977	Montana	4–6	1–5	7th	
1978	Montana	5–6	4–2	T–2nd	
1979	Montana	3–7	2–5	T–6th	
Montana:		16–25	10–15		
Total:		16–25			
