= Jack Swarthout =

American football player, coach, and administrator (1920–2005)

Biographical details
- Born: February 23, 1920; Sunnyside, Washington, U.S.
- Died: October 1, 2005 (aged 85); Olympia, Washington, U.S.
- Education: University of Montana, 1942

Playing career
- 1939–1941: Montana
- Positions: Quarterback, halfback, end

Coaching career (HC unless noted)
- 1947–1955: Hoquiam HS (WA)
- 1956: Washington (freshman)
- 1957–1958: Texas (assistant)
- 1959–1966: Olympia HS (WA)
- 1967–1975: Montana
- 1976–1985: Capital HS (WA)
- 1992: Frankfurt Galaxy (WR)

Administrative career (AD unless noted)
- 1967–1975: Montana

Head coaching record
- Overall: 51–41–1 (college)

Accomplishments and honors

Championships
- 2 Big Sky (1969, 1970)

Awards
- 3× Big Sky Coach of the Year (1967, 1969, 1970)

Harold Jack Swarthout (February 23, 1920 – October 1, 2005) was an American college football player, coach, and administrator. He served as head football coach and athletic director at his alma mater, the University of Montana, from 1967 through 1975. Swarthout compiled an overall record of 51–41–1 (.554), winning Big Sky Conference championships in 1969 and 1970.

Swarthout played for the Grizzlies in the three seasons immediately prior to World War II as an undersized but exciting back, nicknamed "Rabbit." He graduated from Montana in 1942, served in the U.S. Army during the war, then coached high school football in Hoquiam, Washington.

== Montana ==
In December 1966, Swarthout was hired as head football coach at Montana, following a 1–8 season under Hugh Davidson. Swarthout had been a college assistant coach under Darrell Royal and was the head coach at Olympia High School in Olympia, Washington.

Swarthout brought on Jack Elway as an assistant and together they led the Grizzlies to a much-improved 7–3 record in their first season and was named the Big Sky's coach of the year. (Elway was the quarterback at Hoquiam High School in the late 1940s under head coach Swarthout.) Within two years, Swarthout guided Montana to back-to-back undefeated regular seasons in 1969 and 1970, UM's first Big Sky Conference titles. Both years they were defeated by North Dakota State in the Camellia Bowl, which was part of a set of bowls that led up to a poll to determine the NCAA College Division national championship, prior to the current College Division playoff structure.

After the 1970 season, Swarthout was rumored as a candidate for head coach at Illinois in the Big Ten Conference, but he stayed with the Grizzlies. He was indicted in federal court in 1972 concerning the diversion of student-aid funds to the athletic department, but was acquitted in April 1973.

Swarthout stepped down as UM athletic director in July 1975, and after nine seasons as head football coach in Missoula, he departed in the summer of 1976. He returned to Olympia that fall to coach at Capital High School for the next decade.

== Death ==
After a battle with non-Hodgkin lymphoma, Swarthout died at age 85 in Olympia.

== Head coaching record ==
Year	Team	Overall	Conference	Standing	Bowl/playoffs
Montana Grizzlies (Big Sky Conference) (1967–1975)
1967	Montana	7–3	2–2	T–2nd	
1968	Montana	2–7	0–4	5th	
1969	Montana	10–1	4–0	1st	L Camellia
1970	Montana	10–1	5–0	1st	L Camellia
1971	Montana	6–5	3–2	3rd	
1972	Montana	3–8	3–3	T–3rd	
1973	Montana	4–6	2–4	T–4th	
1974	Montana	3–6–1	2–3–1	4th	
1975	Montana	6–4	3–3	4th	
Montana:		51–41–1	24–21–1		
Total:		51–41–1			
National championship Conference title Conference division title or championship game berth
