= Larry Donovan =

American football player and coach (1941–2025)

Biographical details
- Born: March 31, 1941; Casper, Wyoming, U.S.
- Died: April 13, 2025 (aged 84)

Playing career
- 1960–1962: Nebraska
- Position: End

Coaching career (HC unless noted)
- 1964–1971: South Dakota (assistant)
- 1972–1975: Washington State (assistant)
- 1976–1978: Iowa (assistant)
- 1979: Kansas (assistant)
- 1980–1985: Montana
- 1986–1987: BC Lions (DL/ST)
- 1987–1989: BC Lions
- 1990–1991: Saskatchewan Roughriders (LB/ST)
- 1992–2007: Hurricanes

Head coaching record
- Overall: 25–38–1 (college); 14–12 (CFL); 1–18 (X1)
- Tournaments: 0–1 (NCAA D-I-AA playoffs)

Accomplishments and honors

Championships
- 1 Big Sky (1982); 1 CFL West Division (1988)

Larry Richard Donovan (March 31, 1941 – April 13, 2025) was an American football coach. He served as head football coach at the University of Montana from 1980 to 1985 and as head coach for the BC Lions of the Canadian Football League (CFL) from 1987 to 1989. Donovan's coaching career spanned 52 years, working with teams in the United States, Korea, Canada, and Japan.

== Early life ==
Donovan was born in Casper, Wyoming, on March 31, 1941. Father Bill was working as a ranch hand and cowboy while mother Mary was the ranch cook. He grew up with one sibling, sister Jean Ingrum, born in California. Donovan was an active youth, helping relatives with farm work as a boy. The family moved to Scottsbluff, Nebraska, in 1945. There, Donovan's physicality translated to athletic success when he started pole vaulting and setting records in junior high. He participated in other sports, including Golden Gloves (amateur boxing), baseball, and basketball. Donovan attended Scottsbluff High School where he lettered in football, basketball, and track. He set a state record for a 13-foot pole vault in 1959 when he won a gold medal as an elite athlete in the country for his age group. Honors included being selected to the All-State First Team for football in 1958 and starting in the first Nebraska Shrine Bowl game at Rosenblatt Stadium in Omaha Nebraska in 1959. Outside athletics, Donovan served as Vice President of the Student Council in his senior year.

After graduating from Scottsbluff High School, Donovan remained an active alumnus. In 1982, he established the Conner-Madden Memorial Scholarship with fellow alumni Kendal Early and Bob Peshek. In the fall of 2024, Donovan was inducted into the Scottsbluff High School Hall of Fame.

== College years ==
Out of high school, Donovan was offered a football scholarship at the University of Nebraska–Lincoln. He started three of four eligible years, sitting his junior year due to an injury. The Cornhuskers made it to the Gotham Bowl in 1962, the same year Donovan was voted Most Eligible Bachelor. Donovan also ran track for the university, lettering both as a football player and pole vaulter.

During college, Donovan was an active part of the student body. He pledged Phi Kappa Psi fraternity and became VP of the organization and was president of the N-Club. Politically, he was involved with the Young Democrats, where he was Vice President of the local club.

Donovan graduated from the University of Nebraska in 1964 with a Bachelor of Education. He also had a Masters in educational administration +30 from the University of South Dakota.

== Military career ==
Donovan began his military career when he joined the ROTC in college. Following graduation, he was a commissioned second lieutenant in the US Army. He served two years of active duty in Oklahoma and Korea. While in Korea, Donovan served as Forward Artillery in the DMZ, receiving an Army commendation medal for his service; he was also co-coach and player for the undefeated champions of the 2nd infantry division in 1966. During his time in Fort Sill, Oklahoma and Fort Chaffe, Arkansas, Donovan was Battery Commander. When he was coaching in South Dakota, Donovan also served with the National Guard.

== Coaching career ==
Donovan served as an assistant at South Dakota, Washington State, Iowa, and Kansas before becoming Montana's head coach on December 15, 1979. He led the Grizzlies to the Big Sky Conference Championship in 1982.

In his six seasons as head coach of the Grizzlies, Donovan had a 25–38–1 (.398) record and only one winning season. On November 25, 1985, athletic director Harley Lewis announced that the contracts of Donovan and eight of his assistants would not be renewed. Donovan believed that he had been unjustly fired and blamed the antiquated Dornblaser Field for his lack of success in recruiting. Donovan successfully canvassed and raised money for a new stadium in collaboration with Denis Washington, resulting in the construction of Washington–Grizzly Stadium that opened in 1986.

Donovan's next coaching job was in the CFL as the defensive line coach for the BC Lions. On October 30, 1987, head coach Don Matthews was fired and Donovan was named interim head coach. The Lions went 4–0 after the coaching change and finished the season in first place in the West Division, falling to the eventual Grey Cup champion Edmonton Eskimos in the West Final game. In 1988, his first and only full season as head coach, the Lions had a 10–8 record and made it to the Grey Cup, losing to the Winnipeg Blue Bombers 22–21. The Lions struggled in 1989 and Donovan was fired after an 0–4 start.

Donovan was an assistant coach for the Saskatchewan Roughriders in 1990 and 1991. He traveled to Japan to coach the X-League Hurricanes sponsored by Hitachi Limited and Renesas Technologies from 1992 until 2007. He was a training camp coach and consultant for the Asahi Beverage Challengers in Osaka, Japan in 2010.

== Personal life and death ==
In 1966, Donovan married college sweetheart Georgia Merriam in Lincoln, Nebraska. Merriam was an original University of Nebraska pom-pom cheerleader and Miss Nebraska Universe in 1964. She earned a BS from the University of Nebraska and went on to get an MA from the University of Iowa. Together, the couple have three daughters: Andrea, Molly, and Lindsay.

Donovan died on April 13, 2025, at the age of 84. His death was announced the following day by the BC Lions.

== Head coaching record ==
=== College ===
| Year | Team | Overall | Conference | Standing | Bowl/playoffs | NCAA^{#} |
|---|---|---|---|---|---|---|
Montana Grizzlies (Big Sky Conference) (1980–1985)
| 1980 | Montana | 3–7 | 1–6 | 8th | | |
| 1981 | Montana | 7–3 | 5–2 | 3rd | | |
| 1982 | Montana | 6–6 | 5–2 | T–1st | L NCAA Division I-AA First Round | 19 |
| 1983 | Montana | 4–6 | 3–4 | T–5th | | |
| 1984 | Montana | 2–8–1 | 0–7 | 8th | | |
| 1985 | Montana | 3–8 | 2–5 | 6th | | |
| Montana: | | 25–38–1 | 16–26 | | | |
| Total: | | 25–38–1 | | | | |
National championship Conference title Conference division title or championship game berth
