= Bob Stitt =

American football player and coach (born 1964)

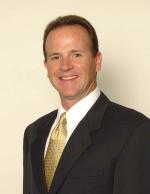

Current position
- Title: Head coach
- Team: Colorado Mines
- Conference: RMAC
- Record: 115–66

Biographical details
- Born: May 4, 1964 (age 62); Tecumseh, Nebraska, U.S.

Playing career
- 1982–1986: Doane
- Position: Running back

Coaching career (HC unless noted)
- 1987: Doane (DB)
- 1988: Nebraska Wesleyan (RB)
- 1989: Northern Colorado (GA)
- 1990–1993: Doane (OC/OL)
- 1994–1998: Austin (AHC/OC/STC)
- 1999: Harvard (OC/OL)
- 2000–2014: Colorado Mines
- 2015–2017: Montana
- 2018: Oklahoma State (OA)
- 2019: Texas State (OC/QB)
- 2024: Valor Christian HS (CO) (OC/QB)
- 2025–present: Colorado Mines

Head coaching record
- Overall: 136–80
- Tournaments: 1–3 (NCAA D-II playoffs); 1–1 (NCAA D-I playoffs)

Accomplishments and honors

Championships
- 3 RMAC (2004, 2010, 2014)

Awards
- 2× RMAC Coach of the Year (2004, 2010); D2Football.com SW Region Coach of the Year (2004); Division II AFCA Region 5 Coach of the Year (2004)

Robert Allen Stitt (born May 4, 1964) is an American college football coach. He is the head football coach for the Colorado School of Mines, a position he resumed in 2025. He previously served as the head coach at the University of Montana from 2015 to 2017 and at Colorado School of Mines from 2000 to 2014, where he compiled an overall record of 108–62.

== Early life ==
Stitt was born in Tecumseh, Nebraska. After playing football, baseball, basketball, and track at Tecumseh High School in Tecumseh, he played football as a running back at Doane College, receiving the All State College Offensive Player of the Year title in 1985.

== Coaching career ==
Stitt is widely regarded in college football as an offensive innovator because of his modernized west-coast style offense. He first studied offense at the University of Northern Colorado under Kay Dalton, receiving his master's degree there. He then returned to Doane as its offensive coordinator for four years, coaching three NAIA Division II All-Americans and 19 All-NAIA offensive players during this time. Stitt went on to coach at Austin College from 1994 to 1998, serving as the assistant head coach and the coordinator of offense and special teams, before taking a job at Harvard University as the offensive coordinator, where he set Ivy League records with a fourth place in total offense.

=== Colorado School of Mines (first stint) ===
In 2000, Stitt was hired as the head coach at Colorado School of Mines (CSM). In 2004, CSM won the Rocky Mountain Athletic Conference (RMAC) crown. That same season, quarterback Chad Friehauf won the Harlon Hill Trophy, the equivalent to the Heisman Trophy, awarded to the best player in NCAA Division II football. In both 2006 and 2008, CSM appeared in the Dixie Rotary Bowl, and they split the RMAC title in the 2010 season with the University of Nebraska at Kearney.

=== Montana ===
Stitt was announced as the 36th head coach of the University of Montana Grizzlies on December 16, 2014, to resurrect the Griz football program and take them back to the winning ways under which they played under coaches Joe Glenn, Bobby Hauck, and Don Read.

In Stitt's first football game as a Division I coach, Montana upset four-time defending FCS national champions North Dakota State 38–35 on a 1-yard run with 0:06 left on the clock.

=== Colorado School of Mines (second stint) ===
On February 7, 2025, Bob Stitt returned to Colorado School of Mines as the head football coach, resuming the role he previously held from 2000 to 2014.

=== National media appearance ===
Stitt became known to people outside the CSM community, when Dana Holgorsen, the head coach at West Virginia University, gave him credit for the fly sweep play his Mountaineers team used to great success in the 2012 Orange Bowl.

== Head coaching record ==
Year	Team	Overall	Conference	Standing	Bowl/playoffs	Rank^{#}
Colorado Mines Orediggers (Rocky Mountain Athletic Conference) (2000–2014)
2000	Colorado Mines	2–8	1–7	9th		
2001	Colorado Mines	7–4	4–4	5th		
2002	Colorado Mines	7–4	4–4	T–5th		
2003	Colorado Mines	6–5	4–4	T–4th		
2004	Colorado Mines	12–1	8–0	1st	L NCAA Division II Second Round	8
2005	Colorado Mines	6–5	6–2	T–2nd		
2006	Colorado Mines	4–7	2–6	8th		
2007	Colorado Mines	7–5	6–2	3rd		
2008	Colorado Mines	8–4	7–2	T–2nd		
2009	Colorado Mines	8–3	8–1	2nd		
2010	Colorado Mines	9–3	8–1	T–1st	L NCAA Division II First Round	19
2011	Colorado Mines	8–3	6–3	3rd		
2012	Colorado Mines	6–5	4–5	5th		
2013	Colorado Mines	8–3	7–2	2nd		
2014	Colorado Mines	10–2	8–1	T–1st	L NCAA Division II First Round	19
Montana Grizzlies (Big Sky Conference) (2015–2017)
2015	Montana	8–5	6–2	T–2nd	L NCAA Division I Second Round	14
2016	Montana	6–5	3–5	8th		
2017	Montana	7–4	5–3	T–6th		
Montana:		21–14	14–10			
Colorado Mines Orediggers (Rocky Mountain Athletic Conference) (2025–present)
2025	Colorado Mines	7–4	5–4	T–4th		
2026	Colorado Mines	0–0	0–0			
Colorado Mines:		115–66	88–48			
Total:		136–80				
National championship Conference title Conference division title or championship game berth
