= Montana Grizzlies football =

University of Montana college football team

2026 Montana Grizzlies football team
- First season: 1897; 129 years ago
- Athletic director: Kent Haslam
- Head coach: Bobby Kennedy; 1st season, 0–0 (–)
- Location: Missoula, Montana
- Stadium: Washington–Grizzly Stadium (capacity: 27,000)
- Field: John Hoyt Field
- NCAA division: Division I FCS
- Conference: Big Sky
- Colors: Maroon and silver
- All-time record: 659–522–26 (.557)
- Bowl record: 0–4 (.000)

NCAA Division I FCS championships
- 1995, 2001

Conference championships
- Big Sky: 1969, 1970, 1982, 1993, 1995, 1996, 1998, 1999, 2000, 2001, 2002, 2003, 2004, 2005, 2006, 2007, 2008, 2009, 2023
- Rivalries: Montana State (rivalry); Eastern Washington (rivalry); Idaho (rivalry)
- Website: gogriz.com

The Montana Grizzlies football (commonly referred to as the "Griz") program represents the University of Montana in the NCAA Division I Football Championship Subdivision (FCS) of college football. The Grizzlies have competed in the Big Sky Conference since 1963, where it is a founding member. They play their home games on campus in Missoula at Washington–Grizzly Stadium.

The Grizzlies had a streak of 25 consecutive winning seasons from 1986 to 2011, including seven runs to the NCAA FCS (formerly Division I-AA) championship. As of completion of the 2023 season, the 2012 season is the Montana Grizzlies' only losing season in the past 37 years. The Grizzlies play in Washington-Grizzly Stadium, known as the Mecca of the FCS. It is known for its relentless crowd noise and intense passion of its fans. They have a winning percentage of .890 including the playoffs. In Stadium Journey Magazine, Washington-Grizzly was ranked No. 1 in all of the FCS for football game day experience and 7th in all college football including FBS schools. They hold the records for most playoff appearances in a row (17), Big Sky Conference titles in a row (12), and overall playoff appearances (19). Their success made them the most successful program in all of college football in the 2000s (119 wins) and third most successful team in FCS in the 1990s (93 wins). On September 4, 2021, Montana upset the #20 (FBS) Washington Huskies at Husky Stadium in Seattle, Washington.

== History ==
=== Early years (1897–1934) ===
The University of Montana's first football season was in 1897, when the team played six games; they won a single game, against future rival Montana State. The team played only schools from Montana until it helped found the Northwest Intercollegiate Athletic Association (NWIAA) in 1902. In addition to Montana, this original Northwest Conference included Washington, Washington State, Oregon, Oregon State, Idaho, and Whitman College. Despite the association's stated goal of increasing intercollegiate athletics, Montana continued to play only the nearest teams. Unfortunately, the team would not win a game against a Northwest Conference opponent until a 10-0 win over Washington State in 1914.

In 1915, the Northwest Conference had become superfluous with the creation of the Pacific Coast Conference, which by 1924 already included the five public Northwest Conference schools from Washington, Oregon, and Idaho, in addition to California and Stanford. Montana joined the conference in 1924 and remained there through the 1949 season. Montana won only nine conferences games (8–16 against rival Idaho), and never played a home game against a team from the state of California.

No team was organized in 1918, due to World War I and the 1918 flu pandemic.

=== Doug Fessenden era (1935–1948) ===
(46–40–4) Record, (9–1) vs. Cats
Doug Fessenden was the first Montana coach to last more than five years, and of those who coached more than two years, he was the first to end his career with a winning record.

The program was on hiatus for the 1943 and 1944 seasons, due to World War II. Of the six teams in the northern division of the PCC, only Washington continued through the war.

=== Mountain States (Skyline) Conference era (1951–1961) ===
In 1948, the Montana board of education announced that it was de-emphasizing athletics at the state university. Key to the university's decision was the feeling that continued affiliation with the PCC was incompatible with the goal to "keep intercollegiate athletics properly subordinated to the academic function" and they would "seek to develop competition in all sports with institutions similar in purpose, size, resources and academic standing." The conference was only "preferable to having no conference affiliation."

In 1951, Montana joined the Mountain States Conference, popularly known as the Skyline Conference, and competed there until the conference dissolved in the summer of 1962. The Grizzlies never had a winning season in the Skyline and never won more than three games until 1960. In 1963, Montana joined Gonzaga, Idaho, Idaho State, Weber State, and Montana State in forming the Big Sky Conference. (Gonzaga dropped its football program after 1941 and Idaho did not compete in conference play until 1965.)

=== Jack Swarthout era (1967–1975) ===
(51–41–1) Record, (3–6) vs. Cats
Montana's football struggles continued in the new Big Sky Conference, and the team had only won nine games in its first four seasons when school officials decided that a coaching change was needed. Following a 1–9 season in 1966, University of Montana president Robert T. Pantzer announced in December the hiring of Jack Swarthout, a former quarterback/halfback/end from Montana. Swarthout brought on Jack Elway as an assistant and they improved the team immediately to 7–3 in their first season. Within two years, Swarthout guided the team to back-to-back undefeated regular seasons in 1969 and 1970, and Montana's first Big Sky Conference titles. At the end of both years, they were defeated by North Dakota State in the Camellia Bowl, which was part of a set of bowls that determined the NCAA Football Championship Subdivision national championship, prior to the current FCS playoff structure.

Continued success was expected, but a disappointing season in 1971 was followed by a work-study scandal that eventually led to Swarthout's resignation. In 1972, a federal grand jury returned a 32-count indictment charging five university officials and coaches (including Swarthout) with conspiring to illegally use federal-aid money to pay for fictitious jobs for athletes. Though Swarthout was found not guilty, the charges hurt recruiting and the student-body government decided to withdraw financial support for athletic programs. Despite the controversy and resultant performance decline, Swarthout is credited as being the coach that turned Montana into a winning football program.

=== Don Read era (1986–1995) ===
(85–36) Record, (10–0) vs. Cats
After Swarthout's departure, Montana would register only one winning season over the next 10 years. In November 1985, Montana fired coach Larry Donovan and replaced him with Portland State's head coach, Don Read. Over the next 10 years, Montana would go 85-36, have 10 straight winning seasons, and was undefeated against cross-state rival Montana State. Read would win 2 conference titles, make the FCS playoffs 5 times and win Montana's first national championship.

=== Mick Dennehy era (1996–1999) ===
(39–12) record, (4–0) vs. Cats
Mick Dennehy had been the offensive coordinator under Don Read and was promoted to head coach when Read retired in 1995. Dennehy continued Montana's success, making it to the national championship in his first year for a rematch against Marshall University. This time, however, Montana lost 49–29. Montana made the playoffs every year under Dennehy and continued to beat Montana State, but they did not make it past the first round of the playoffs after his first season. After the 1999 season, Dennehy accepted a head coaching position at Utah State.

=== Joe Glenn era (2000–2002) ===
(39–6) Record, (2–1) vs. Cats
The Joe Glenn era began with high hopes for the winner of two Division II championships at the University of Northern Colorado. He did not disappoint, making it to the national championship in his first two seasons, where he won it in his second appearance. Unfortunately, during Glenn's third year, Montana's win streak against Montana State finally came to end at 16 straight games. Glenn left after the 2002 season to pursue the head coaching job at the University of Wyoming.

=== Bobby Hauck era (2003–2009) ===
(80–17) Record, (5–2) vs. Cats
Bobby Hauck began his tenure in 2003, and over the next 7 years would win a share of the Big Sky Conference title every year. His teams made it to the national championship game three times but lost each game including in 2004 (lost to JMU), 2008 (lost to the University of Richmond), and 2009 (lost to Villanova University). After the 2009 season, Hauck left to take the head coaching job at UNLV. He returned as head coach in 2017 after leaving UNLV and being an assistant for San Diego State.

=== Robin Pflugrad era (2010–2011) ===
(13–7) Record, (1–1) vs. Cats
In 2009, Robin Pflugrad returned to Montana to become the wide receivers coach under Bobby Hauck. After that season, Hauck left Montana to become the head coach at UNLV, and Pflugrad was promoted to replace him. Pflugrad said after his hiring that Montana would be "very fast on offense, up-tempo and upbeat." Pflugrad led Montana to a Big Sky Conference title and a national semifinal appearance in 2011, but those were vacated by the NCAA on July 26, 2013 due to infractions which included a nationally publicized rape scandal. Individually, Pflugrad was hit with numerous sanctions by the NCAA for his part in the infractions.

=== Mick Delaney era (2012–2014) ===
(24–14) Record, (2–1) vs. Cats
Mick Delaney was hired July 26, 2012, replacing former head coach Robin Pflugrad. On July 26, 2013, the NCAA found the Montana football program guilty of multiple major infractions and one secondary infraction. None of these infractions occurred while Delaney was the head coach. Delaney retired after three seasons.

=== Bob Stitt era (2015–2017) ===
(21–14) Record, (1–2) vs. Cats
On December 16, 2014, the university announced that Bob Stitt would be replacing former head coach Mick Delaney after he announced his retirement. Bob Stitt started his tenure at Montana with one of the most memorable games in Griz football history with a 38–35 win over the 4-time Defending FCS National Champions North Dakota State thanks to an 80-yard, 1:37 scoring drive to end the game.

=== Bobby Hauck era, part two (2018–2026) ===
(71-26) Record, (2–6) vs. Cats
Hauck returned to Montana for the 2018 season. Montana earned its 200th win at home against Sacramento State on September 22, 2018, 41–34.

On September 4, 2021, Montana upset the #20 ranked Washington Huskies. It was their first win against Washington since 1920 and only their second overall win in 20 games against the Huskies. It was also the fifth occasion a FCS team beat a ranked FBS team since the 1978 FBS/FCS split.

=== Bobby Kennedy era (2026–Present) ===
On February 5th, 2026, following the announcement of Bobby Hauck's retirement, Bobby Kennedy was announced as the program's 38th head coach.

== Program achievements ==
The Grizzlies rank among the all-time playoff appearance leaders, with appearances in 1982, 1988, 1989, and 1993–2009. The Grizzlies had a playoff streak of 17 in a row from 1993–2009, which is a record at the I-AA level, now known as Football Championship Subdivision. The streak came to an end on November 21, 2010 when the Grizzlies were not selected to the FCS playoffs following a loss to in-state rival Montana State.

The Grizzlies won the national championship in 1995 under Don Read when Dave Dickenson led the team to a victory over Marshall University in the national championship game. In 2001, coach Joe Glenn led the Montana Grizzlies to another national championship by defeating Furman University, 13-6.

== Conference affiliations ==
Montana has competed as both an independent and as a conference member throughout its history.

- Independent (1897–1923)
- Pacific Coast Conference (1924–1949)
- Independent (1950)
- Mountain States Conference (1951–1961)
- Independent (1962)
- Big Sky Conference (1963–present)

== Championships ==
=== National championships ===
Year	Division	Coach	Record	Opponent	Result
1995	Division I-AA	Don Read	13–2	Marshall	W 22–20
2001	Division I-AA	Joe Glenn	15–1	Furman	W 13–6

=== Conference championships ===
Montana has won 19 conference championships, all in the Big Sky Conference

Year	Conference	Overall record	Conference record	Coach
1969	Big Sky Conference	10–1	4–0	Jack Swarthout
1970	Big Sky Conference	10–1	6–0	Jack Swarthout
1982†	Big Sky Conference	6–6	5–2	Larry Donovan
1993	Big Sky Conference	10–2	7–0	Don Read
1995	Big Sky Conference	13–2	6–1	Don Read
1996	Big Sky Conference	14–1	8–0	Mick Dennehy
1998	Big Sky Conference	8–4	6–2	Mick Dennehy
1999	Big Sky Conference	9–3	7–1	Mick Dennehy
2000	Big Sky Conference	13–2	8–0	Joe Glenn
2001	Big Sky Conference	15–1	7–0	Joe Glenn
2002†	Big Sky Conference	11–3	5–2	Joe Glenn
2003†	Big Sky Conference	9–4	5–2	Bobby Hauck
2004†	Big Sky Conference	12–3	6–1	Bobby Hauck
2005†	Big Sky Conference	8–4	5–2	Bobby Hauck
2006	Big Sky Conference	12–2	8–0	Bobby Hauck
2007	Big Sky Conference	11–1	8–0	Bobby Hauck
2008†	Big Sky Conference	14–2	7–1	Bobby Hauck
2009	Big Sky Conference	14–1	8–0	Bobby Hauck
2023	Big Sky Conference	12–1	7–1	Bobby Hauck

† Co-champions

== Head coaches ==
Coach	Tenure	Seasons	Record	Pct.	Conf. champs	Bowl games	Playoff appearances	National titles	Record vs. MSU
Fred Smith	1897	1	1–2–3	.417	0	0	0	0	1–0
Sgt. F.B Searight	1898	1	3–2	.600	0	0	0	0	2–0
Guy Cleveland	1899	1	1–2	.333	0	0	0	0	0–2
Frank Bean	1900–1901	2	2–4	.333	0	0	0	0	0–2
Dewitt Peck	1902	1	0–3	.000	0	0	0	0	0–1
Northwest Intercollegiate Athletic Association (1902)
H.B. Conibear	1903–1904	2	5–7	.417	0	0	0	0	1–1
F.W. Schule	1905–1906	2	4–7	.364	0	0	0	0	–
Albion Findlay	1907	1	4–1–1	.750	0	0	0	0	–
Roy White	1908–1909	2	7–2–2	.727	0	0	0	0	2–1–1
Robert Cary	1910–1911	2	5–3–1	.611	0	0	0	0	1–0–1
Lt. W.C. Philoon	1912	1	4–3	.571	0	0	0	0	2–0
A.G. Heilman	1913–1914	2	8–4–1	.653	0	0	0	0	3–0
Jerry Nissen	1915–1917	3	7–7–3	.500	0	0	0	0	1–0–1
Bernie Biermann	1919–1921	3	9–9–3	.500	0	0	0	0	2–0–1
Jon Stewart	1922–1923	2	7–8	.467	0	0	0	0	2–0
Pacific Coast Conference (1924–1949)
Earl "Click" Clark	1924–25	2	7–8–1	.469	0	0	0	0	1–0
Frank Millburn	1926–1930	5	18–22–3	.453	0	0	0	0	3–1–1
Bernard "Bunny" Oakes	1931–1934	4	8–22–1	.274	0	0	0	0	3–1
Doug Fessenden	1935–1941/1946–1948	12	46–40–4	.533	0	0	0	0	9–1
Clyde Carpenter	1942	1	0–8	.000	0	0	0	0	–
George Dahlberg	1945	1	1–4	.200	0	0	0	0	–
Ted Shipkey	1949–1951	3	12–16	.429	0	0	0	0	3–0
Mountain States Conference (1951–1961)
Eddie Chinske	1952–54	3	8–18–1	.315	0	0	0	0	4–0
Jerry Williams	1955–57	3	6–23	.207	0	0	0	0	1–2
Ray Jenkins	1958–63	6	14–43	.246	0	0	0	0	2–4
Big Sky Conference (1963–present)
Hugh Davidson	1964–1966	3	8–20	.286	0	0	0	0	0–3
Jack Swarthout	1967–1975	9	51–41–1	.554	2 (1969, 1970)	2 (1969, 1970)	0	0	3–6
Gene Carlson	1976–1979	4	16–25	.390	0	0	0	0	1–3
Larry Donovan	1980–1985	6	25–37–1	.404	1 (1982)	0	1 (1982)	0	2–4
Don Read	1986–1995	10	85–36	.702	2 (1993, 1995)	0	5 (1988, 1989, 1993–1995)	1 (1995)	10–0
Mike Dennehy	1996–1999	4	39–12	.765	3 (1996, 1998, 1999)	0	4 (1996–1999)	0	4–0
Joe Glenn	2000–2002	3	39–6	.867	3 (2000–2002)	0	3 (2000–2002)	1 (2001)	2–1
Bobby Hauck	2003–2009	7	80–17	.825	7 (2003–2009)	0	7 (2003–2009)	0	5–2
Robin Pflugrad†	2010–2011	2	~~18–7~~; 13–7	~~.720~~.650	~~1 (2011)~~	0	~~1 (2011)~~	0	~~1–1~~; 0–1
Mick Delaney	2012–2014	3	24–14	.632	0	0	2 (2013, 2014)	0	2–1
Bob Stitt	2015–2017	3	21–14	.600	0	0	1 (2015)	0	1–2
Bobby Hauck	2018–present	8	71–26	.732	1 (2023)	0	6 (2019, 2021–2025)	0	2–6

† Montana was penalized by the NCAA on July 26, 2013 and forced to vacate its last five wins of the 2011 season. One win was against Montana State. It was also forced to vacate its conference title and appearance in the 2011 FCS playoffs.

== Home venues ==
The Montana Grizzlies have played their home games in Washington–Grizzly Stadium since its construction in 1986. The stadium has an official capacity of 25,203. However, its record attendance is 26,856 which was set on November 20, 2021 with a 29 to 10 smashing defeat of cross state Rivals Montana state Bobcats. Construction of the stadium closely follows the Grizzlies recent success, and since its construction the Grizzlies have a 218 - 34 record as of 2021 and have gone undefeated 11 times. Stadium journey magazine ranked Washington Grizzly Stadium #1 in the FCS, # 7 in all college football and # 65 in all sports in all countries .

Before Washington-Grizzly Stadium, the Grizzlies played off-campus at "new" Dornblaser Field from 1968 to 1986. Prior to 1968, Montana played on-campus at "old" Dornblaser Field from 1920 to 1967. Both stadiums were named for Paul Dornblaser, the team's captain in 1912, who was killed in World War I. Prior to 1920, Montana played its home games at a field in downtown Missoula, near the former Missoulian newspaper building.

== Rivalries ==
=== Montana State ===
Montana's primary rivalry is the Brawl of the Wild (AKA: The Griz - Cat game) against the Montana State University Bobcats in Bozeman. The game has been played 124 times, and the Griz lead the series, 74–46-5. The Montana State Bobcats won the last game 42-16 on November 21, 2026

The series has three distinct periods. From 1897 to 1916, the teams didn't belong to a conference, but at times would play twice per year. Early seasons had seven games or less, with one season seeing the Grizzlies play just one game. Four of the five ties in the series came during this era. Montana won 12 games to Montana State's 7.

In 1917, Montana State joined the Rocky Mountain Athletic Conference (RMAC). In 1924, Montana joined what is now the Pac-12 Conference when it entered the Pacific Coast Conference. The RMAC included several teams that would become Mountain West Conference members. When MSU joined the RMAC, it included Colorado, Colorado State, Utah, Utah State, and Brigham Young. When UM joined the PCC, it included Stanford, California, UCLA, USC, Oregon, Oregon State, Washington, Washington State, and Idaho. The Bobcats remained in the RMAC through 1956, while the Grizzlies remained in the PCC through 1949. Montana joined the Mountain States Conference from 1951–1961. MSU was independent from 1957–1962 and UM was independent in 1950 and 1962. During this period UM, enjoyed a 30–8–1 edge in Griz-Cat games.

Both schools entered the Big Sky Conference as charter members in 1963, with Montana holding a 42–15–2 series lead. From 1963 to 1985, Montana State enjoyed its most successful period of the Griz - Cat rivalry. MSU won 17 games to just six for UM. Following that, Montana started "The Streak" when it won 16 straight games from 1986 to 2001. Montana holds a 31–28 lead in the series during the Big Sky era.

- Montana was penalized by the NCAA on July 26, 2013 and forced to vacate its last five wins of the 2011 season. One win was against Montana State.

=== Idaho ===
Montana formerly played an annual rivalry game against the Idaho Vandals for the Little Brown Stein. The series was paused in 2004 as a result of Idaho moving up to division I-A (now FBS). The Montana-Idaho rivalry resumed during the 2018 season when Idaho returned to the Big Sky Conference as a full member. Montana won the game at Idaho, 46–27. The Grizzlies trail in the 91-game series 32–57–2 (.356).

=== Eastern Washington ===
The Grizzlies also have a rivalry game in the Big Sky Conference with the Eastern Washington Eagles, called the EWU–UM Governors Cup. Montana leads the series 32–18–1. The EWU-UM Governors Cup was played annually from 1982 to 2017. In 2018, conference realignment ended the annual matchup between the teams, but they still face off regularly as conference foes.

== Uniforms ==
=== Colors ===
- Maroon & Silver (1893–1967, 1997–present)
- Copper & Gold (1968–1996)

The official school colors of the University of Montana are copper, silver, and gold; these were chosen in recognition of the state's mining history. Contrary to popular perception, these colors have never changed, with the confusion stemming from the university's decision to represent "copper" with either maroon or "Texas orange" at various times in its history.

When the university was founded in 1893 and its colors were chosen, a lack of copper dye led the school to use maroon, and occasionally other colors, to represent copper. This had the effect of having the school's athletic teams not always being represented across the board by the same uniform colors. In 1967, head football coach and athletic director Jack Swarthout, who personally preferred the maroon and silver used by the football team, sought to make the schools colors more consistent and held a vote among UM coaches. They selected Texas orange (burnt orange to represent copper) and yellow gold to be used on the school's uniforms and it remained for the next 30 years.

The maroon was brought back in 1993 as part of the university's centennial celebrations and a student survey in 1995 showed support for a return to maroon and silver uniforms. Despite some vocal opposition, by 1997, the colors began to phase into the maroon and silver that are used.

=== #37 Jersey ===
The #37 Jersey is a tradition that began in 1987 by then-running back Kraig Paulson. The tradition holds that whoever wears the #37 jersey selects an in-state recruit and leading defensive player to wear it next.

Player	Pos.	Hometown	Years with jersey
Kraig Paulson	RB	Plentywood	1983–1986
Tim Hauck	DB	Big Timber	1987–1989
Todd Ericson	DB	Butte	1990–1993
Jason Crebo	LB	Helena	1994–1997
Andy Petek	DE	Helena	1998–2000
Ciche Pitcher	DE	Anaconda	2001–2003
Loren Utterback	LB	Fort Benton	2004–2007
Carson Bender	DT	Deer Lodge	2008–2010
Ryan Fetherston	DE	East Helena	2011
Jordan Tripp	LB	Missoula	2012–2013
Zack Wagenmann	DE	Missoula	2014
Caleb Kidder	DT	Helena	2015–2016
Tucker Schye	DE	Malta	2017
Jesse Sims	DE	Stevensville	2018–2019
Jace Lewis	LB	Townsend	2021
Marcus Welnel	LB	Helena	2022
Levi Janacaro	LB	Missoula	2023
Trevin Gradney	DB	Billings	2024
Clay Oven	LB	Billings	2025

== Postseason results ==
=== College Division / Division II ===
Formerly in the University Division, Montana moved down to the College Division for football in 1963 with the formation of the Big Sky Conference. The College Division concluded the season with four regional bowls, played in December after the final polls were released. The undefeated Grizzlies played in the Camellia Bowl in 1969 and 1970, but lost both to North Dakota State in Sacramento, California.

Season	Bowl	Opponent	Result	Location	Head Coach
1969	Camellia	North Dakota State	L 3–30	Sacramento, CA	Jack Swarthout
1970	Camellia	North Dakota State	L 16–31	Sacramento, CA	Jack Swarthout

Division II debuted in 1973 and introduced a playoff system; Montana and the Big Sky moved to the new Division I-AA in 1978.

=== Division I-AA/FCS Playoffs ===
The Grizzlies have appeared in the I-AA/FCS playoffs 30 times with a record of 43–28. However, their 2011 appearance has been vacated, reducing their official playoff record to 41–27 in 29 appearances. With seven trips to the title game in fifteen seasons, they were national champions twice (1995, 2001) and runner–up six times (1996, 2000, 2004, 2008, 2009, 2023).

Season	Round	Opponent	Result	Head Coach
1982	First Round	@ Idaho	L 3–17	Larry Donovan
1988	First Round	@ Idaho	L 19–38	Don Read
1989	First Round; Quarterfinals; Semifinals	Jackson State; Eastern Illinois @ Georgia Southern	W 48–7; W 25–19; L 15–45	Don Read
1993	First Round	Delaware	L 48–49	Don Read
1994	First Round; Quarterfinals; Semifinals	Northern Iowa; McNeese State @ Youngstown State	W 23–10; W 30–28; L 9–28	Don Read
1995	First Round; Quarterfinals; Semifinals; Championship	Eastern Kentucky; Georgia Southern; Stephen F. Austin @ Marshall	W 48–0; W 45–0; W 70–14; W 22–20	Don Read
1996	First Round; Quarterfinals; Semifinals; Championship	Nicholls State; East Tennessee State; Troy State @ Marshall	W 48–3; W 44–14; W 70–7; L 29–49	Mick Dennehy
1997	First Round	@ McNeese State	L 14–19	Mick Dennehy
1998	First Round	@ Western Illinois	L 9–52	Mick Dennehy
1999	First Round	Youngstown State	L 27–30	Mick Dennehy
2000	First Round; Quarterfinals; Semifinals; Championship	Eastern Illinois; Richmond; Appalachian State vs. Georgia Southern	W 45–13; W 34–20; W 19–16 ^{OT} L 25–27	Joe Glenn
2001	First Round; Quarterfinals; Semifinals; Championship	Northwestern State; Sam Houston State; Northern Iowa vs. Furman	W 28–19; W 49–24; W 38–10; W 13–6	Joe Glenn
2002	First Round; Quarterfinals	Northwestern State @ McNeese State	W 45–14; L 20–24	Joe Glenn
2003	First Round	Western Illinois	L 40–43 ^{2OT}	Bobby Hauck
2004	First Round; Quarterfinals; Semifinals; Championship	Northwestern State; New Hampshire; Sam Houston State vs. James Madison	W 56–7; W 47–17; W 34–13; L 21–31	Bobby Hauck
2005	First Round	Cal Poly	L 21–35	Bobby Hauck
2006	First Round; Quarterfinals; Semifinals	McNeese State; Southern Illinois; Massachusetts	W 31–6; W 20–3; L 17–19	Bobby Hauck
2007	First Round	Wofford	L 22–23	Bobby Hauck
2008	First Round; Quarterfinals; Semifinals; Championship	Texas State; Weber State @ James Madison vs. Richmond	W 31–13; W 24–13; W 35–27; L 7–24	Bobby Hauck
2009	First Round; Quarterfinals; Semifinals; Championship	South Dakota State; Stephen F. Austin; Appalachian State vs. Villanova	W 61–48; W 51–0; W 24–17; L 21–23	Bobby Hauck
~~2011~~†	~~Second Round~~; ~~Quarterfinals~~; ~~Semifinals~~	~~Central Arkansas~~; ~~Northern Iowa~~; ~~@ Sam Houston State~~	~~W 41–14~~; ~~W 48–10~~; ~~L 28–31~~	Robin Pflugrad
2013	Second Round	Coastal Carolina	L 35–42	Mick Delaney
2014	First Round; Second Round	San Diego @ Eastern Washington	W 52–14; L 20–37	Mick Delaney
2015	First Round; Second Round	South Dakota State @ North Dakota State	W 24–17; L 6–37	Bob Stitt
2019	Second Round; Quarterfinals	Southern Louisiana @ Weber State	W 73–28; L 10–17	Bobby Hauck
2021	Second Round; Quarterfinals	Eastern Washington @ James Madison	W 57–41; L 6–28	Bobby Hauck
2022	First Round; Second Round	Southeast Missouri State @ North Dakota State	W 34–24; L 26–49	Bobby Hauck
2023	Second Round; Quarterfinals; Semifinals; Championship	Delaware; Furman; North Dakota State vs. South Dakota State	W 49–19; W 35–28 ^{OT} W 31–29 ^{2OT} L 3–23	Bobby Hauck
2024	First Round; Second Round	Tennessee State @ South Dakota State	W 41–27; L 18–35	Bobby Hauck
2025	Second Round; Quarterfinals; Semifinals	South Dakota State; South Dakota; Montana State	W 50–29; W 52–22; L 23–48	Bobby Hauck

† Appearance and record vacated

== All-Americans ==
Bill Kelly, QB- 1925 (BEHR 1st team) (College Football Hall of Fame)
Bill Kelly, QB- 1926 (CP-2nd team; RG-2nd team; WE-3rd team ) (College Football Hall of Fame)
Bill Kelly, HB- 1926 (AP-2nd Team [as HB]; BE-3rd team [as HB]) (College Football Hall of Fame)
Stan Renning, G- 1957 (INS-2nd team)
Stan Renning, G- 1958 (AP 3rd team)

== College Football Hall of Fame ==
College Football Hall of Fame
Name	Position	Year	Inducted	Ref
Bernie Bierman	Coach	1919–1921	1955	
Bill Kelly	Quarterback	1924–1926	1969	

"Wild Bill" Kelly was a masterful open field runner who darted and dodged his way to electrifying gains. During his junior and senior seasons, he had five kickoff returns for touchdowns, with two on runs of more than 90 yards. In 1971, Kelly was named quarterback for the Shrine Game's College All-Star All-time Team.

== Individual awards and honors ==
=== Retired numbers ===
Montana Grizzlies retired numbers
No.	Player	Pos.	Tenure	Ref.
15	Dave Dickenson	QB	1992–1995	
22	Terry Dillon	HB	1960–1962	

=== National honors—players ===
- Walter Payton Award

National Offensive Player of the Year
1995: Dave Dickenson

- Walter Payton Award finalists

1989: Tim Hauck
1996: Brian Ah Yat
1997: Brian Ah Yat
1998: Brian Ah Yat
1999: Drew Miller
2001: Yohance Humphery
2002: John Edwards
2004: Craig Ochs
2005: Lex Hilliard
2009: Chase Reynolds

- Buck Buchanan Award

National Defensive Player of the Year
2007: Kroy Biermann
2019: Dante Olson

- Buck Buchanan Award finalists

2000: Andy Petek (Runner-up)
2001: Vince Huntsberger (Runner-up)
2002: Trey Young
2006: Kroy Biermann
2011: Trumaine Johnson
2012: Jordan Tripp
2013: Jordan Tripp

- STATS FCS Defensive Player of the Year

2015: Tyrone Holmes

- Jerry Rice Award

Most Outstanding Freshman of the Year
2023: Eli Gillman

- National Football Foundation National Scholar-Athlete Award

NFF National Scholar-Athlete Award
Year	Name	Position
1995	Dave Dickenson	QB
1997	Joshua Branen	HB
2001	Vince Huntsberger	S
2015	Derek Crittenden	DE
2019	Dante Olson	LB

=== National honors—coaches ===
- American Football Coaches Association (AFCA)

National Coach of the Year
1995: Don Read

- Amos Alonzo Stagg Award

1958: Bernie Bierman

- Eddie Robinson Award

National Coach of the Year
2002: Joe Glenn

=== Big Sky Conference honors ===
- Offensive MVP

1993: Dave Dickenson, QB
1994: Dave Dickenson, QB
1995: Dave Dickenson, QB
1996: Brian Ah Yat, QB
1998: Brian Ah Yat, QB
2002: John Edwards, QB

- Defensive MVP

1974: Ron Rosenberg, LB
1976: Greg Anderson, DB
1988: Tim Hauck, DB
1989: Tim Hauck, DB
1996: Jason Crebo, LB
1999: Vince Huntsberger, SS
2000: Andy Petek, DE
2001: Vince Huntsberger, SS
2002: Trey Young, FS
2007: Kroy Biermann, DE
2011: Caleb McSurdy, LB
2019: Dante Olson, LB (co-player of the year)
2023: Alex Gubner, DT

- Top Newcomer

1999: Drew Miller, QB
2003: Justin Green, RB
2018: Dalton Sneed, QB
2019: Marcus Knight, RB
2021: Justin Ford, CB
2023: Clifton McDowell, QB

- Coach of the Year

1969: Jack Swarthout
1970: Jack Swarthout
1989: Don Read
1993: Don Read
1995: Don Read
1996: Mick Dennehy
2000: Joe Glenn
2001: Joe Glenn
2002: Joe Glenn
2006: Bobby Hauck
2007: Bobby Hauck
2009: Bobby Hauck
2011: Robin Pflugrad
2023: Bobby Hauck

=== Other awards and honors ===
- Grizzlies quarterback Bob O'Billovich was selected as the Montana Athlete of Decade (1960–1970)

== Program alumni who played professionally ==
Griz in the Pros

Player	Year	Team	League	Round
Steve Sullivan	1922	Evansville Crimson Giants	NFL	
Ted Illman	1926	Wilson's Wildcats	AFL I	
"Wild" Bill Kelly	1927	New York Yankees	NFL	
Len Noyes	1937	Brooklyn Dodgers	NFL	
Milt Popovich	1937	Chicago Cardinals	NFL	
Paul Szakash	1937	Detroit Lions	NFL	7th
Aldo Forte	1938	Chicago Bears	NFL	21st
Bill Lazetich	1938	Cleveland Rams	NFL	16th
John Dolan	1941	Buffalo Indians	AFL III	
Wally Stephens	1947	Calgary Stampeders	CFL	
Earl Keeley	1958	BC Lions	CFL	
John Lands	1960	Indianapolis Warriors	UFL	
Gary Schwertfeger	1961	British Columbia Lions	CFL	
Bob O'Billovich	1962	Ottawa Rough Riders	CFL	
Terry Dillon	1963	Minnesota Vikings	NFL	
Mike Tilleman	1964	Chicago Bears	NFL	
Bryan Magnuson	1968	Washington Redskins	NFL	8th
Maceo Gray	1969	Baltimore Colts	NFL	
Dave Urie	1969	Houston Oilers	AFL IV	
Tim Gallagher	1971	Dallas Cowboys	NFL	
Willie Postler	1972	British Columbia Lions	NFL	
Steve Okoniewski	1972	Atlanta Falcons	NFL	
Roy Robinson	1972	Saskatchewan Roughriders	CFL	
Walt Brett	1975	Atlanta Falcons	NFL	4th
Ron Rosenberg	1975	Cincinnati Bengals	NFL	13th
Barry Darrow	1974	Cleveland Browns	NFL	
Greg Harris	1976	New York Jets	NFL	
Doug Betters	1977	Miami Dolphins	NFL	
Terry Falcon	1977	New England Patriots	NFL	
Greg Anderson	1979	Montreal	CFL	
Tim Hook	1979	Saskatchewan Roughriders	CFL	
Carm Carteri	1979	Ottawa Rough Riders	CFL	
Guy Bingham	1980	New York Jets	NFL	10th
Pat Curry	1982	Seattle Seahawks	NFL	
Rocky Klever	1982	New York Jets	NFL	9th
Rich Burtness	1982	Dallas Cowboys	NFL	12th
Mike Hagen	1982	Seattle Seahawks	NFL	
Mickey Sutton	1983	Pittsburgh Maulers	USFL	
Brian Salonen	1984	Dallas Cowboys	NFL	10th
Mike Rice	1987	New York Jets	NFL	8th
Brent Pease	1987	Minnesota Vikings	NFL	11th
Larry Clarkson	1988	San Francisco 49ers	NFL	8th
Pat Foster	1988	Los Angeles Rams	NFL	9th
Tim Hauck	1989	New England Patriots	NFL	
Jay Fagan	1989	Washington Redskins	NFL	
Kirk Scrafford	1989	Cincinnati Bengals	NFL	
Grady Bennett	1991	British Columbia Lions	CFL	
Matt Clark	1991	British Columbia Lions	CFL	
Mike Trevathan	1991	British Columbia Lions	CFL	
Brad Lebo	1992	Cincinnati Bengals	NFL	
Sean Dorris	1992	Houston Oilers	NFL	
Todd Ericson	1994	Indianapolis Colts	NFL	
Carl Franks	1994	Toronto Argonauts	CFL	
Scott Gragg	1995	New York Giants	NFL	2nd
Scott Gurnsey	1995	Toronto Argonauts	CFL	
Shalon Baker	1995	British Columbia Lions	CFL	
Marc Lamb	1995	New York Jets	NFL	
Keith Burke	1995	Ottawa Rough Riders	CFL	
Dave Dickenson	1996	Calgary Stampeders	CFL	
Matt Wells	1996	Saskatchewan Roughriders	CFL	
Blaine McElmurry	1997	Houston Oilers	NFL	
Joe Douglass	1997	New York Jets	NFL	
David Kempfert	1997	Seattle Seahawks	NFL	
Jeff Zellick	1997	New York Giants	NFL	
Jason Baker	1998	Jacksonville Jaguars	NFL	
Jason Crebo	1998	Buffalo Bills	NFL	
Brian Ah Yat	1999	Winnipeg Blue Bombers	CFL	
Scott Curry	1999	Green Bay Packers	NFL	6th
Kris Heppner	2000	Seattle Seahawks	NFL	
Rylan Jollymore	2000	Rangers Modling	AFL	
Dallas Neil	2000	Atlanta Falcons	NFL	
Jeremy Watkins	2000	New York Giants	NFL	
Jimmy Farris	2001	San Francisco 49ers	NFL	
Leif Thorsen	2001	British Columbia Lions	CFL	1st
Thatcher Szalay	2002	Cincinnati Bengals	NFL	
Calvin Coleman	2002	New York Giants	NFL	
Drew Miller	2002	Detroit Fury	Arena	
Etu Molden	2002	Chicago Rush	Arena	
Spencer Frederick	2002	New Orleans Saints	NFL	
Dylan McFarland	2003	Buffalo Bills	NFL	7th
Jon Skinner	2003	San Diego Chargers	NFL	
Chris Snyder	2003	Detroit Lions	NFL	
Justin Green	2004	Baltimore Ravens	NFL	5th
Andy Petek	2004	Hamilton Tiger-Cats	CFL	
Cory Procter	2005	Dallas Cowboys	NFL	
Craig Ochs	2005	San Diego Chargers	NFL	
Levander Segars	2005	Montreal Alouettes	CFL	
Willie Walden	2005	Kansas City Chiefs	NFL	
Trey Young	2005	Calgary Stampeders	CFL	
Brad Rhoades	2006	Tennessee Titans	NFL	
Tuff Harris	2007	Miami Dolphins	NFL	
Josh Swogger	2007	Kansas City Chiefs	NFL	
Ryan Bagley	2008	Saskatchewan Roughriders	CFL	
Kroy Biermann	2008	Atlanta Falcons	NFL	5th
Cody Balogh	2008	Chicago Bears	NFL	
Dan Carpenter	2008	Miami Dolphins	NFL	
Lex Hilliard	2008	Miami Dolphins	NFL	6th
Colt Anderson	2009	Minnesota Vikings	NFL	
Colin Dow	2009	Cincinnati Bengals	NFL	
Cole Berquist	2009	Saskatchewan Roughriders	CFL	
J. D. Quinn	2009	Miami Dolphins	NFL	
Mike Stadnyk	2009	Saskatchewan Roughriders	CFL	2nd
Marc Mariani	2010	Tennessee Titans	NFL	7th
Shann Schillinger	2010	Atlanta Falcons	NFL	6th
Levi Horn	2010	Chicago Bears	NFL	
Jimmy Wilson	2011	Miami Dolphins	NFL	7th
Jabin Sambrano	2011	Indianapolis Colts	NFL	
Chase Reynolds	2011	Los Angeles Rams	NFL	
Trumaine Johnson	2012	Los Angeles Rams	NFL	3rd
Caleb McSurdy	2012	Dallas Cowboys	NFL	7th
Dan Moore	2013	Indianapolis Colts	NFL	
Dan Kistler	2013	Oakland Raiders	NFL	
William Poehls	2013	Tennessee Titans	NFL	
Jordan Tripp	2014	Miami Dolphins	NFL	5th
Brock Coyle	2014	Seattle Seahawks	NFL	
John Kanongata'a	2014	Ottawa Redblacks	CFL	
Zack Wagenmann	2015	Arizona Cardinals	NFL	
Travon Van	2015	Ottawa Redblacks	CFL	
Tyrone Holmes	2016	Jacksonville Jaguars	NFL	6th
Herbert Gamboa	2018	Lazio Ducks	IFL	
Dante Olson	2020	Philadelphia Eagles	NFL	
Dalton Sneed	2020	Winnipeg Blue Bombers	CFL	
Junior Bergen	2025	San Francisco 49ers	NFL	7th
Keelan White	2025	Ottawa Redblacks	CFL	1st
Michael Wortham	2026	Jacksonville Jaguars	NFL	

== Future non-conference opponents ==
Schedule as of October 9, 2026.

2027	2028	2029	2030	2031
Lehigh (Sept. 4th)	Monmouth (Sept. 2nd)	vs South Dakota State; Vegas Kickoff Classic, Las Vegas, NV (Sept. 1st)	UTRGV; Aug. 31	at UTRGV; Aug. 30
Central Washington (Sept. 11)	at Incarnate Word (Sept. 9th)	Incarnate Word (Sept. 8th)		
West Florida (Sept. 18th)				

== See also ==
- American football in the United States
- College football
