= Don Read =

American football coach (1933–2024)

Biographical details
- Born: December 15, 1933; Los Angeles, California, U.S.
- Died: January 3, 2024 (aged 90)

Playing career
- late 1950s: Sacramento State

Coaching career (HC unless noted)
- 1960s: Placer HS (CA) (assistant)
- 1960s: Petaluma HS (CA)
- 1966–1967: Humboldt State (assistant)
- 1968–1971: Portland State
- 1972–1973: Oregon (QB/Rec)
- 1974–1976: Oregon
- 1977–1980: Oregon Tech
- 1981–1985: Portland State
- 1986–1995: Montana

Administrative career (AD unless noted)
- 2004–2005: Montana

Head coaching record
- Overall: 155–126–1 (college); 19–5–2 (high school)
- Tournaments: 8–4 (NCAA D-I-AA playoffs)

Accomplishments and honors

Championships
- 1 NCAA Division I-AA (1995); 1 Evergreen (1980); 1 Western Football (1984); 2 Big Sky (1993, 1995)

Awards
- AFCA Division I-AA COY (1995)

Donald Bert Read (December 15, 1933 – January 3, 2024) was an American college football coach and athletics administrator. He was the head coach at Portland State University (1968–1971, 1981–1985), the University of Oregon (1974–1976), the Oregon Institute of Technology (1977–1980), and the University of Montana (1986–1995), compiling a career college football record of 155–126–1 (.551).

From 1968 to 1971 and 1981 to 1985, Read led the Portland State Vikings to a 39–52–1 record. From 1974 to 1976, he guided the Oregon Ducks to a 9–24 record (3–18 in Pac-8); the two previous seasons he mentored quarterbacks and receivers under head coach Dick Enright.

Read's best success came at Montana, where he went 85–36 (.702), including three 11-win seasons and an NCAA Division I-AA Championship in his final year of coaching, 1995. Read resided in Corvallis, Oregon, where he participated in scouting and game planning for Oregon State football.

Read died on January 3, 2024, at the age of 90.

== Education ==
In 1962, Read earned his master's degree in social science from Sacramento State University.

== Head coaching record ==
=== College ===
Year	Team	Overall	Conference	Standing	Bowl/playoffs
Portland State Vikings (NCAA College Division independent) (1968–1971)
1968	Portland State	4–6			
1969	Portland State	6–4			
1970	Portland State	6–4			
1971	Portland State	4–5			
Portland State:		20–19			
Oregon Ducks (Pacific-8 Conference) (1974–1976)
1974	Oregon	2–9	0–7	8th	
1975	Oregon	3–8	2–5	6th	
1976	Oregon	4–7	1–6	T–7th	
Oregon:		9–24	3–18		
Oregon Tech Hustlin' Owls (Evergreen Conference) (1977–1980)
1977	Oregon Tech	2–7	1–5	T–6th	
1978	Oregon Tech	5–4 (Note: Oregon Tech finished the 1978 with an overall record of 4–5 and a mark of 2–4 in conference play, tying for fifth place in the Evergreen Conference. In January 1979, Central Washington forfeited its three wins, including its victory over Oregon Tech, from 1978 because of ineligible player.)	3–3	T–3rd	
1979	Oregon Tech	7–2	3–2	T–2nd	
1980	Oregon Tech	7–2	4–1	T–1st	
Oregon Tech:		22–14	11–11		
Portland State Vikings (NCAA Division II Independent) (1981)
1981	Portland State	2–9			
Portland State Vikings (Western Football Conference) (1982–1985)
1982	Portland State	2–9	0–4	5th	
1983	Portland State	3–7	1–2	T–3rd	
1984	Portland State	8–3	3–0	1st	
1985	Portland State	4–5–1	2–2–1	3rd	
Portland State:		19–33–1	6–8–1		
Montana Grizzlies (Big Sky Conference) (1986–1995)
1986	Montana	6–4	4–4	4th	
1987	Montana	6–5	5–3	3rd	
1988	Montana	8–4	6–2	2nd	L NCAA Division I-AA First Round
1989	Montana	11–3	7–1	2nd	L NCAA Division I-AA Semifinal
1990	Montana	7–4	4–4	4th	
1991	Montana	7–4	6–2	T–2nd	
1992	Montana	6–5	4–3	T–3rd	
1993	Montana	10–2	7–0	1st	L NCAA Division I-AA First Round
1994	Montana	11–3	5–2	T–2nd	L NCAA Division I-AA Semifinal
1995	Montana	13–2	6–1	1st	W NCAA Division I-AA Championship
Montana:		85–36	54–22		
Total:		155–126–1			
National championship Conference title Conference division title or championship game berth

== See also ==
- 1995 NCAA Division I-AA Football Championship Game
