= Bobby Hauck =

American football coach

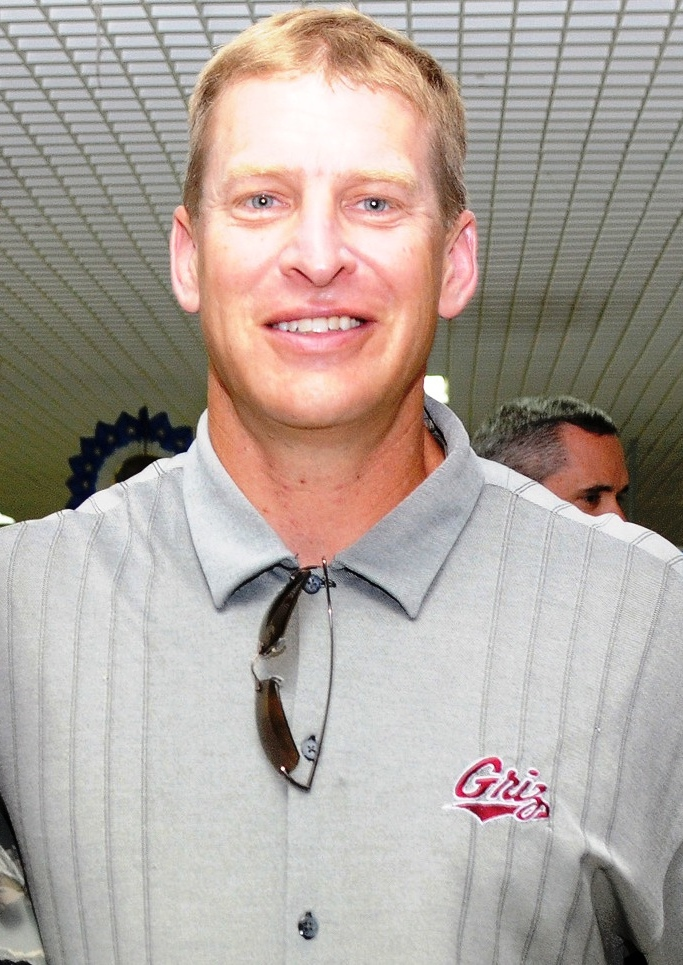
- Hauck in July 2009

Biographical details
- Born: June 14, 1964 (age 62); Missoula, Montana, U.S.
- Education: University of Montana (B.A., 1988); University of California, Los Angeles (M.S., 1991)

Coaching career (HC unless noted)
- 1988–1989: Montana (DB/DL)
- 1990–1992: UCLA (GA)
- 1993–1994: Northern Arizona (OLB)
- 1995–1998: Colorado (S/OLB/ST)
- 1999–2002: Washington (DB/ST)
- 2003–2009: Montana
- 2010–2014: UNLV
- 2015–2017: San Diego State (ST)
- 2018–2025: Montana
- 2026: Illinois (DC)

Head coaching record
- Overall: 166–92
- Bowls: 0–1
- Tournaments: 24–16 (NCAA D-I playoffs)

Accomplishments and honors

Championships
- 8 Big Sky (2003–2009, 2023)

Robert Lawrence Hauck (born June 14, 1964) is an American college football coach. He was most recently the defensive coordinator at the University of Illinois. Prior to Illinois, he was the head football coach at the University of Montana, a position he held from 2003 to 2009 and resumed before the 2018 season. Hauck was also the head football coach at the University of Nevada, Las Vegas (UNLV) from 2010 to 2014. During his first stint as head coach at Montana, Hauck led the Grizzlies to seven Big Sky Conference titles and postseason berths in as many seasons, including three national championship game appearances. In 2013, following three losing seasons at UNLV, Hauck led the Rebels to their first winning season since 2000, only to backslide to 2–11 the following season, resulting in a buyout of his remaining contract and a negotiated resignation. After three seasons (2015–2017) as special teams coordinator with San Diego State, he returned to Montana as head coach.

In 2025, Hauck was voted as president of the American Football Coaches Association (AFCA).

== Early days ==
Hauck was born in Missoula, Montana, and was schooled at Sweet Grass County High School in Big Timber. His brother Tim was a star defensive back at Montana and went on to play 13 seasons in the National Football League (NFL). Bobby did his higher studies at the University of Montana (1988) and UCLA (1991). Hauck never played football at the collegiate level, instead competing in track at Montana before getting into coaching.

== Head coaching career ==
=== Montana ===
Hauck's first season as head coach of Montana was in 2003, and over the next seven seasons, the Griz won or shared seven straight Big Sky Conference championships. While never winning a national championship, he is the fourth coach to guide Montana to the FCS Championship game. He took the 2004 team to the NCAA Division I-AA national championship game and the 2006 team to the I-AA semifinals. In 2007, he signed a one-year contract, rejecting a three-year deal that he was offered. Montana lost the national championship game in 2008, 2009, and 2023. Hauck finished his career with a 7-8 record against the Grizzlies arch rival, Montana State.

=== UNLV ===
Hauck had been rumored as a candidate for the vacant head coaching position at UNLV in December 2009 and interviewed with UNLV's Athletic Director Jim Livengood on December 20, 2009. On December 22, the Las Vegas Sun reported that Hauck would be named UNLV's next head coach after completing a second interview earlier that day. Hauck and UNLV agreed on a three-year contract worth $350,000 annually in base pay. Hauck could also earn up to $150,000 in completion bonuses that are heavy in incentives. UNLV announced on November 28, 2014, that Hauck had submitted his resignation to the team after going 15–48 in five seasons.

=== San Diego State ===
On January 16, 2015, Hauck was hired as the special teams coordinator for the San Diego State football team. In 2016, Hauck was promoted to associate head coach.

=== Controversy and Return to Montana ===
In 2017, a coalition of students, community leaders, and advocates in Missoula, Montana campaigned against the rehiring of Hauck. Spearheaded by then graduate student, Lisa Davey, citing concerns over past player misconduct and the University of Montana's response to multiple allegations of sexual assault incidents involving the players during Hauck's previous tenure. The non-fiction book Missoula: Rape and the Justice System in a College Town by Jon Krakauer was centered around these incidents.

In spite of this community backlash, Hauck was rehired, and returned to Montana during the 2018 season. After starting his first season 6-5, the Grizzlies improved to 10-4 the season after. During Spring 2021 (shortened season due to COVID), the Griz went 2-0. They did not play in 2020.

On September 4, 2021, Hauck and the Grizzlies defeated the #20-ranked Washington Huskies, marking the fifth time ever an FCS team has beat a ranked FBS team, and the first time since 2014 that Hauck had defeated an FBS team.

On February 4, 2026, Hauck announced his retirement.

=== Illinois ===
On February 9, 2026, five days after announcing his retirement at Montana, Hauck was hired as the defensive coordinator for the Illinois Fighting Illini. On September 27, 2026, Hauck and Illinois mutually parted ways after a 42-19 loss to Ohio State.

== Head coaching record ==
| Year | Team | Overall | Conference | Standing | Bowl/playoffs | TSN/STATS^{#} | Coaches^{°} |
|---|---|---|---|---|---|---|---|
Montana Grizzlies (Big Sky Conference) (2003–2009)
| 2003 | Montana | 9–4 | 5–2 | T–1st | L NCAA Division I-AA First Round | 14 | |
| 2004 | Montana | 12–3 | 6–1 | T–1st | L NCAA Division I-AA Championship | 2 | |
| 2005 | Montana | 8–4 | 5–2 | T–1st | L NCAA Division I-AA First Round | 12 | |
| 2006 | Montana | 12–2 | 8–0 | 1st | L NCAA Division I Semifinal | 3 | |
| 2007 | Montana | 11–1 | 8–0 | 1st | L NCAA Division I First Round | 10 | 12 |
| 2008 | Montana | 14–2 | 7–1 | T–1st | L NCAA Division I Championship | 2 | 2 |
| 2009 | Montana | 14–1 | 8–0 | 1st | L NCAA Division I Championship | 2 | 2 |
UNLV Rebels (Mountain West Conference) (2010–2014)
| 2010 | UNLV | 2–11 | 2–6 | 7th | | | |
| 2011 | UNLV | 2–10 | 1–6 | T–6th | | | |
| 2012 | UNLV | 2–11 | 2–6 | 8th | | | |
| 2013 | UNLV | 7–6 | 5–3 | T–3rd (West) | L Heart of Dallas | | |
| 2014 | UNLV | 2–11 | 1–7 | 6th (West) | | | |
| UNLV: | | 15–49 | 11–28 | | | | |
Montana Grizzlies (Big Sky Conference) (2018–present)
| 2018 | Montana | 6–5 | 4–4 | T–6th | | | |
| 2019 | Montana | 10–4 | 6–2 | T–3rd | L NCAA Division I Quarterfinal | 6 | 6 |
| 2020–21 | Montana | 2–0 | 0–0 (Note: Montana opted out of the conference season, but still scheduled non-conference games due to COVID-19 concerns.) | | | | |
| 2021 | Montana | 10–3 | 6–2 | T–3rd | L NCAA Division I Quarterfinal | 6 | 6 |
| 2022 | Montana | 8–5 | 4–4 | 6th | L NCAA Division I Second Round | 14 | 14 |
| 2023 | Montana | 13–2 | 7–1 | 1st | L NCAA Division I Championship | 2 | 2 |
| 2024 | Montana | 9–5 | 5–3 | 5th | L NCAA Division I Second Round | 10 | 13 |
| 2025 | Montana | 13–2 | 7–1 | 2nd | L NCAA Division I Semifinal | 3 | 3 |
| Montana: | | 151–43 | 86–23 | | | | |
| Total: | | 166–92 | | | | | |
National championship Conference title Conference division title or championship game berth

== Awards ==
- 2006 Regional Coach of the Year Winner (Division I-AA, Region 5)
- Big Sky coach of the year 2006, 2007, 2009 and 2023.
- 2023 Region 5 FCS Coach of the Year.

Hauck was also one of the finalists of the 2006 and 2023 Eddie Robinson Award.
