= Inga (disambiguation) =

Inga is a genus of tropical trees and shrubs.

Inga or Ingá may also refer to:

== Geography ==
- Ingá, district of Niterói, Rio de Janeiro state, Brazil
- Ingá, Paraíba, city in Paraíba state, Brazil
  - Ingá Stone
- Ingå, municipality of Finland
- Inga Lake, a Canadian lake along the Alaska Highway
- Inga Falls, a waterfall on the Congo River
- Inga dams, dams and hydroelectric power generators on the Congo river

== Other uses ==
- Inga (novel), a 2014 novel by Poile Sengupta
- Inga people, a group of indigenous peoples in Colombia
  - Inga Kichwa, their language
- Inga (film), a 1968 film by Joseph W. Sarno
- Inka (dharma) or Inga, Zen Buddhist concept
- Inga, a character in the 1974 comedy film Young Frankenstein
- Inga (moth), a genus of moths in the family Oecophoridae
- "Inga", an episode of M*A*S*H
- Prince Inga of Pingaree, a character in Rinkitink in Oz
- Hurricane Inga, a 1969 Atlantic hurricane
- Winter Storm Inga

== People ==
- Inga (given name)
- César Inga (born 2002), Peruvian footballer
- Inga of Varteig (c. 1185–1234), mistress of King Haakon III of Norway and the mother of King Haakon IV
- Va'aiga Tuigamala (1969–2022), nicknamed "Inga The Winger", Samoan rugby union and rugby league player, New Zealand rugby union player

== See also ==
- Ingvar (name)
- Ingo
- Inha Babakova
