= Ingo =

- Pronunciation: Swedish: [ˈɪ̌ŋː(ɡ)ʊ] German: [ˈɪŋɡoː]
- Gender: Male

Origin
- Origin: Germanic
- Meaning: protected by Yngvi
- Region of origin: Northern Europe

Other names
- Related names: Inga

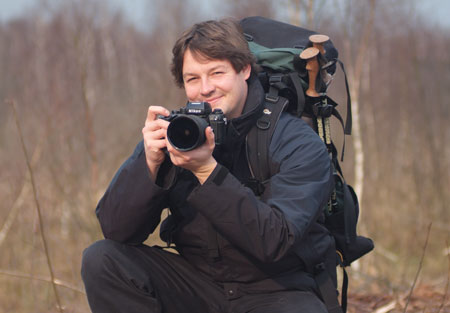
German nature photographer Ingo Kirschnereit

Ingo is a masculine given name in contemporary Scandinavia and Germany, and a historical name in France. It is a Latinized form of the given name Inge. It is the male version of the name Inga, used in the same region.

It means "protected by Yngvi", who is the main god for the Ingvaeones, and is probably a different name for the Germanic god Freyr.

== Persons with the name Ingo ==
- Ingemar Johansson (1932–2009), Swedish boxer, nicknamed "Ingo"
- Ingo Anderbrügge (born 1964), German footballer
- Ingo Appelt (born 1961), German former bobsledder
- Ingo Appelt (born 1967), German comedian
- Ingo Brigandt, Canadian philosopher
- Ingo Bodtke (born 1965), German politician
- Ingo Buding (1942–2003), German tennis player
- Ingo Freyer (born 1971), German professional basketball coach and former national team player
- Ingo Gerhartz (born 1965), German Air Force general
- Ingo Giezendanner (born 1975), Swiss artist
- Ingo Günther (born 1957), German artist
- Ingo Hoffmann (born 1953), Brazilian former race car driver
- Ingo Maurer (1932–2019), German industrial designer
- Ingo Metzmacher (born 1957), German music conductor
- Ingo Molnár, Hungarian computer programmer
- Ingo Mörth (born 1949), Austrian sociologist
- Ingo Normet (1946–2022), Estonian theatre director and pedagogue
- Ingo Nugel (1976–2007), German composer of video game music
- Ingo Preminger (1911–2006), American movie producer, brother of director Otto Preminger
- Ingo Rademacher (born 1971), German-born Australian actor
- Ingo Rechenberg (1934–2021), German researcher and professor currently in the field of bionics
- Ingo Renner (1940–2022), Australian glider pilot, four-time world champion
- Ingo Schmitt (fl. 1995–present), German politician
- Ingo Schulze (born 1962), German author
- Ingo Schwichtenberg (1965–1995), German rock drummer
- Ingo Simon (1875–1964), British singer and archer
- Ingo Steinhöfel (born 1967), German former weightlifter
- Ingo Steuer (born 1966), German figure skater and coach
- Ingo Swann (1933–2013), American psychic
- Ingo Titze, American vocal scientist
- Ingo Wegener (1950–2008), German computer scientist
- Ingo Wellenreuther (born 1959), German politician
- Ingo Zamperoni (born 1974), German news presenter

== Fictional characters ==
- Ingo, an associate of Talon in The Legend of Zelda series
- Ingo, a Subway Boss from Pokémon
- Ingo Manfred, a main character in the Broken Sky trilogy by L. A. Weatherly.

== Literature ==
- Ingo (novel), a 2005 children's novel by Helen Dunmore

== See also ==
- Ingrid
