= Ingvar (name) =

- Gender: Male

Origin
- Origin: Old Norse
- Meaning: Protected by Yngvi
- Region of origin: Scandinavia

Other names
- Related names: Inga, Igor

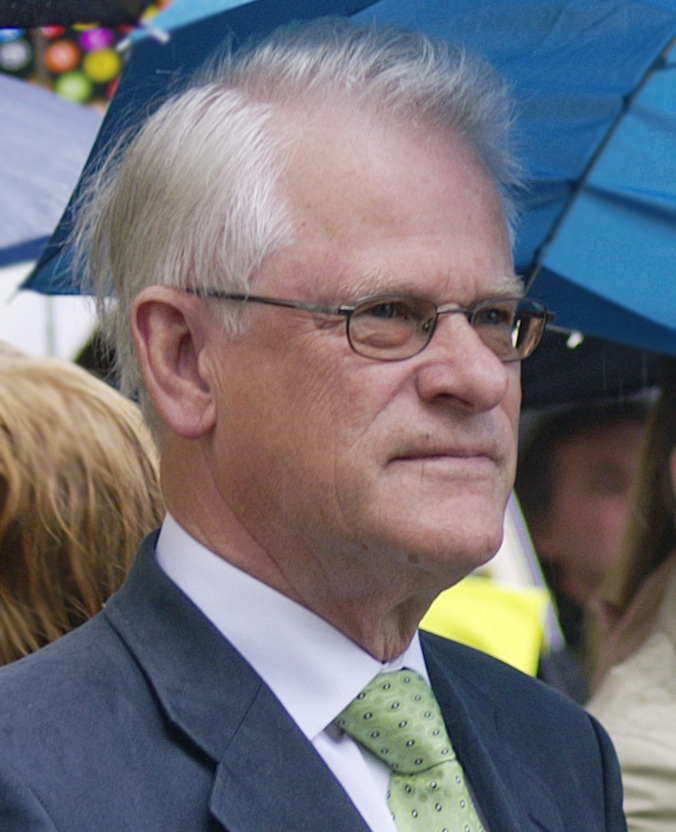
Ingvar Carlsson at the opening of the Lunda Carnival, 2006.

The name Ingvar is an Old Norse first name for men common in Scandinavia meaning "protected by Yngvi". The feminine version of the name is Inga.

The first element of the name is derived from Proto-Norse *Ing(w)ia (Ingi-), Norse Yngvi, who is better known by the title Freyr "Lord". The second element is probably either *harjaz (warrior) or *warjaz (defender). The name consequently either meant Freyr's warrior or Freyr's defender.

Igor is a given name derived from the Scandinavian name Ingvar that was brought to Kievan Rus' by the Varangians.

Old English sources suggest that the birth-name of Ivar the Boneless might have been Ingvar; he is referred to as Hyngvar, Hingvar and Inguar in the English annals.

== People ==
=== First name ===
- Ingvar Harra, Swedish ruler
- Ingvar the Far-Travelled, 11th-century Swedish Viking
- Ingvar of Kiev, 13th-century monarch of Kiev
- Ingvar Ambjørnsen (1956–2025), Norwegian writer
- Ingvar Bengtsson (1922–2001), Swedish athlete
- Ingvar Bengtsson (born 1955), Swedish sailor
- Ingvar Carlsson (born 1934), Swedish politician
- Ingvar Dalhaug (born 1957), Norwegian footballer
- Ingvar Eggert Sigurðsson (born 1963), Icelandic actor
- Ingvar Ericsson, multiple people
- Ingvar Gärd (1921–2006), Swedish football player
- Ingvar Jónsson (born 1989), Icelandic football player
- Ingvar Kamprad (1926–2018), Swedish businessman
- Ingvar Kärnefelt (born 1944), Swedish lichenologist
- Ingvar Lidholm (1921–2017), Swedish composer
- Ingvar Lindell (1904–1993), Swedish jurist and politician
- Ingvar Oldsberg (1945–2022), Swedish television presenter and sports journalist
- Ingvar Pettersson, multiple people
- Ingvar Rydell (1922–2013), Swedish football player
- Ingvar Skogsberg (born 1937), Swedish film director and screenwriter
- Ingvar Svensson, multiple people
- Ingvar Þóroddsson, Icelandic politician

=== Middle name ===
- John Ingvar Lövgren (1930–2002), Swedish murderer
