= *Fraujaz =

Honorific meaning "lord" or "lady"

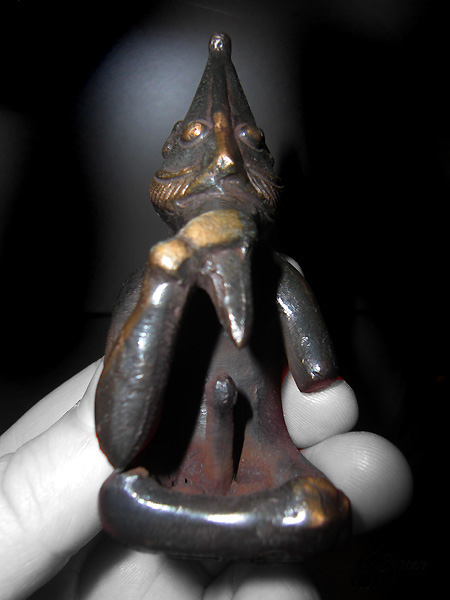
A reproduction of the ithyphallic Rällinge statue, interpreted as a Viking Age depiction of Freyr

*Fraujaz or *Frauwaz (Old High German frô for earlier frôjo, frouwo, Old Saxon frao, frōio, Gothic frauja, Old English frēa, Old Norse freyr), feminine *Frawjōn (OHG frouwa, Old Saxon frūa, Old English frōwe, Goth. *fraujō, Old Norse freyja) is a Common Germanic honorific meaning "lord", "lady", especially of deities.

The epithet came to be used as a proper name of two separate deities in Norse mythology, Freyr and Freyja.

== Etymology ==
The term's etymology is ultimately from a PIE *pro-w-(y)o-s, containing *pro- "in front" (cf. first, Fürst and Sanskrit purohita "high priest", lit. "placed foremost or in front").

Variants indicate n-stems *fraujan-, *frōwōn-. The feminine *frawjōn "lady, domina" in Old English is attested only in a single isolated occurrence as frēo "woman" in the translation of the fragmentary Old Saxon Genesis poem, in the alliterating phrase frēo fægroste "fairest of women".

The stem was confused from early times with *frīj-, which has variants frēo-, frīo-, frēa- (a contraction of *īj- and a following back vowel) beside a less frequent frīg- (/fri:j-/), by development of a glide between ī and a following front vowel. The two forms would originally have figured in complementary distribution within the same paradigm (e.g. masculine nominative singular frēo, masculine genitive singular frīges), but in attested Old English analogical forms are already present and the distribution is no longer complementary

== Direct use ==
In both Old Norse and Old High German the female epithet became a female honorific "lady", in German Frau further weakened to the standard address "Mrs." and further to the normal word for "woman", replacing earlier wîp (English wife) and qinô (English queen) "woman". Just as Norse Freyja is usually interpreted as a hypostasis of *Frijjō (Frigg), Norse Freyr is associated with Ingwaz (Yngvi) based on the Ynglingasaga which names Yngvi-Freyr as the ancestor of the kings of Sweden, which as Common Germanic *Ingwia-fraujaz would have designated the "lord of the Ingvaeones.

The epithet came to be used as the proper name of two separate deities in Norse mythology, Freyr and Freyja. Both Freyr and Freyja are represented zoomorphically by the pig: Freyr has Gullinbursti ("golden bristles") while Freyja has Hildisvíni has ("battle-pig"), and one of Freyja's many names is Syr, i.e. "sow".

For Old Norse, Snorri says that freyja is a tignarnafn (name of honour) derived from the goddess, that grand ladies, rîkiskonur, are freyjur. The goddess should be in Swed. Fröa, Dan. Frøe; the Swed. folk-song of Thor's hammer calls Freyja Froijenborg (the Dan. Fridlefsborg), a Danish one has already the foreign Fru. The Second Merseburg Charm may have Frûa = Frôwa as the proper name of the goddess, although the word in question is difficult to read and usually read as Frija; Frigg.

Although Saxo is silent about this goddess (and her father) scholars expect that he would have called her Fröa.

In Germanic Christianity, the epithet became a name of God, translating κύριος , dominus (Gothic frauja, Old English frēa, Old High German frô).

Grimm attaches significance to the avoidance and the grammatical peculiarities of the lexeme in OHG:

"the reference to a higher being is unmistakable, and in the Middle ages there still seems to hang about the compounds with vrôn something weird, unearthly, a sense of old sacredness; this may account for the rare occurrence and the early disappearance of the OHG. frô, and even for the grammatical immobility of frôno; it is as though an echo of heathenism could still be detected in them."

== Other cognates and derivatives ==
Old Norse Freyr would correspond to a Gothic *fráus or *fravis, instead of which Ulfila has fráuja (gen. fráujins) to translate κύριος , pointing to a proto-form *frawjaz in North Germanic, but a *frauwaz in West Germanic and Gothic.

In Old High German, the full form *frouwo was already lost, the writers preferring truhtîn and hêrro "lord". In Old Low German it survives in the vocative, as frô mîn! "my lord!". The Heliand has frô mîn the gôdo, waldand frô mîn, drohtîn frô mîn, besides frôho (gen. frôhon) and frâho (gen. frâhon).

Old English freá (gen. freán, for freâan, freâwan) is more common in poetry, as in freá ælmihtig (Cædmon 1.9; 10.1), and it also forms compounds: âgendfreá, aldorfreá, folcfreá and even combines with dryhten (freádryhten, Cædm. 54.29, gen. freahdrihtnes, Beowulf 1585, dat. freodryhtne 5150).

Along with OHG frô, there is also found an indeclinable adjective frôno, which is placed before or after substantives, to impart the notion of lordly, high, and holy. For example in der frône bote "the angel of the Lord", conspicuously avoiding the genitive singular (*frôin bote). It survives in Modern German as Fron- in compounds such as Frondienst "socage", whence also a verb frönen.

The word occurs in given names, such as Gothic Fráuja or Fráujila, OHG Frewilo, AS Wûscfreá Old English freáwine in Beowulf is an epithet of divine or god-loved heroes and kings, but Freáwine (Saxo's Frowinus) is also attested as a personal name, reflected also as OHG Frôwin, while the Edda has uses Freys vinr of Sigurðr and Saxo says of the Swedish heroes in the Bråvalla fight that they were Frö dei necessarii. Skaldic 'fiörnis freyr, myrðifreyr (Kormakssaga) means "hero" or "man". In the same way the Kormakssaga uses fem. freyja in the sense "woman, lady".

== In popular culture ==
In Total War: Rome II, Fraujaz is one of the six principal deities of the Suebi, along with Thunaraz, Frijjō, Teiwaz, Wōdanaz and Austo.

== See also ==
- Drohtin
- Frijjō
- Yngvi
- Irmin
- Dís
- God (word)
- Names of God in Old English poetry
- List of names of Freyr

== Sources ==
- Jacob Grimm, Teutonic Mythology, ch. 10.
- Jacob Grimm, Deutsches Wörterbuch:
  - Fron
  - Frau.
