= Fenrir =

Monstrous wolf in Norse mythology

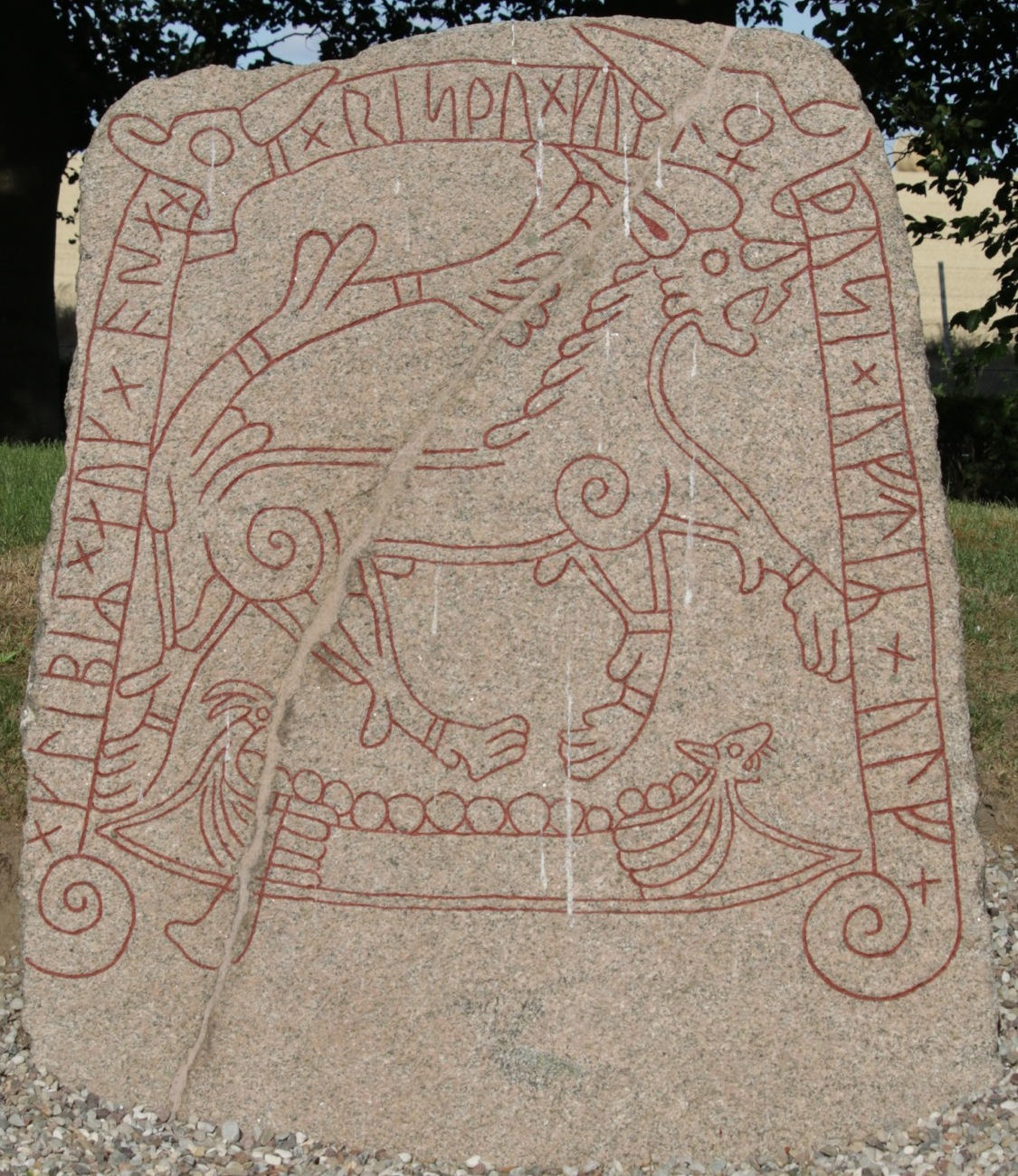
Fenrir and Naglfar on the Tullstorp Runestone. The inscription mentions the name Ulfr ("wolf"), and the name Kleppir/Glippir. The last name is not fully understood, but may have represented Glæipiʀ which is similar to Gleipnir which was the rope with which the Fenrir wolf was bound. The two male names may have inspired the theme depicted on the runestone.

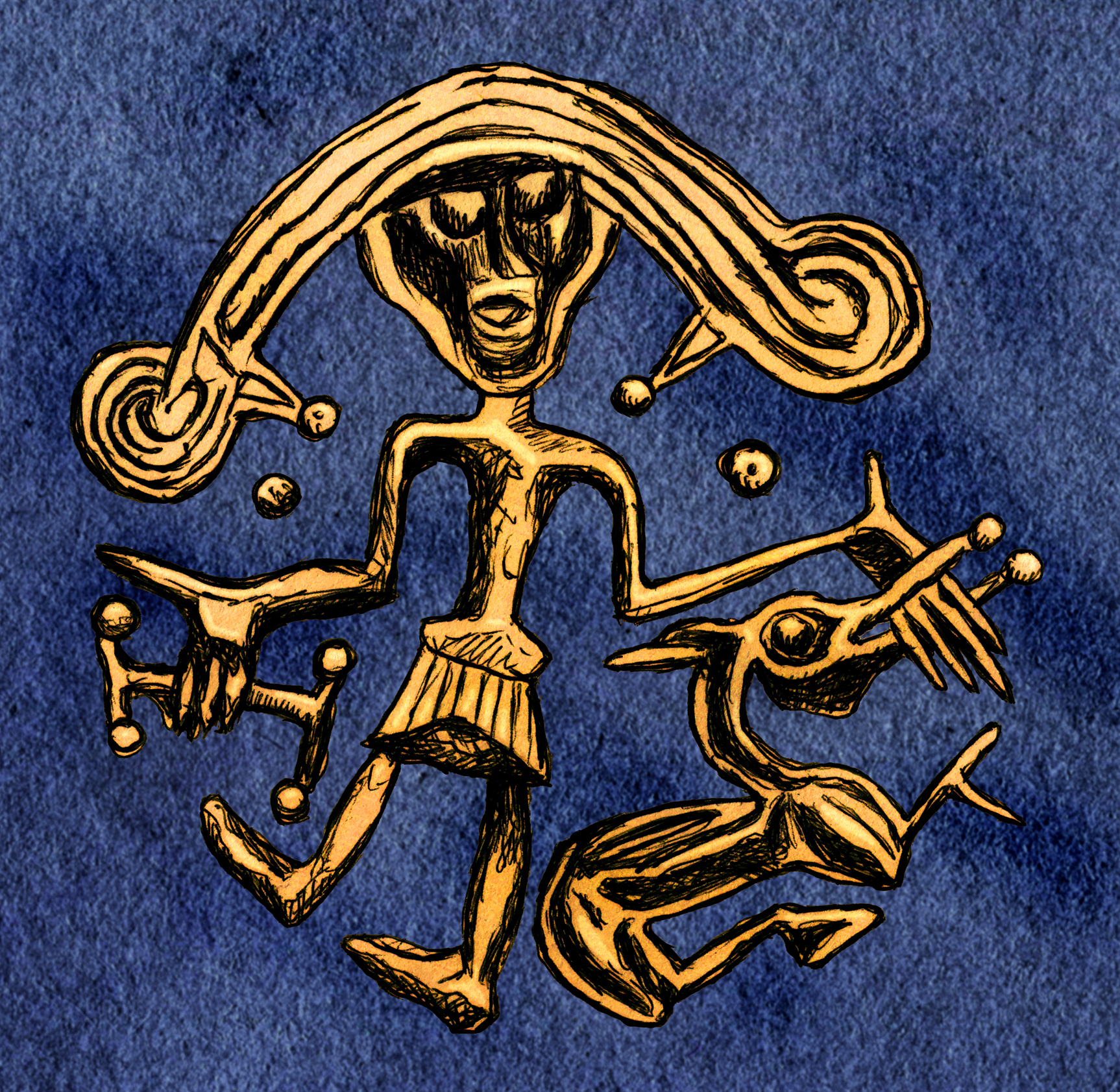
An illustration of an image on a bracteate found in Trollhättan, Västergötland, Sweden. The image is considered a depiction of Týr tricking Fenrir. Drawing by Gunnar Creutz.

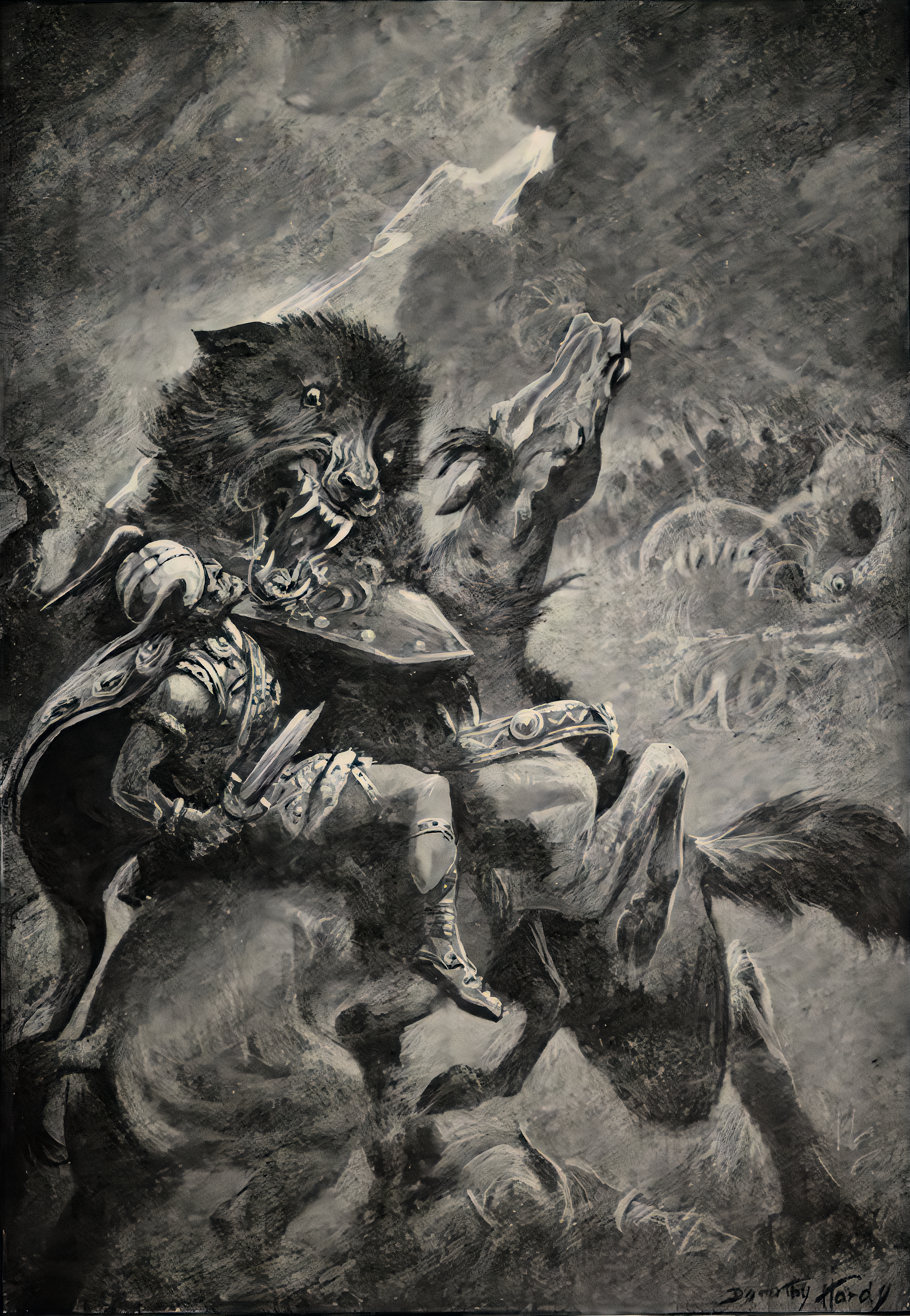
Odin and Fenris (1909) by Dorothy Hardy

Fenrir (Old Norse 'fen-dweller') or Fenrisúlfr (Old Norse "Fenrir's wolf", often translated "Fenris-wolf"), also referred to as Hróðvitnir (Old Norse "fame-wolf") and Vánagandr (Old Norse 'monster of the [River] Ván'), is a monstrous wolf in Norse mythology. In Old Norse texts, Fenrir plays a key role during the events of Ragnarök, where he is foretold to assist in setting the world aflame, resulting in the collapse of humanity and society, and killing the god Odin.

Fenrir, along with Hel and Jörmungandr, is a child of Loki and female jötunn Angrboða. He is attested in the Poetic Edda, compiled in the 13th century from earlier traditional sources, and the Prose Edda and Heimskringla, composed in the 13th century. In both the Poetic Edda and Prose Edda, Fenrir is the father of the wolves Sköll and Hati Hróðvitnisson, is a son of Loki and is foretold to kill the god Odin during the events of Ragnarök, but will in turn be killed by Odin's son Víðarr.

In the Prose Edda, additional information is given about Fenrir, including that, due to the gods' knowledge of prophecies foretelling great trouble from Fenrir and his rapid growth, the gods bound him and as a result Fenrir bit off the right hand of the god Týr. Depictions of Fenrir have been identified on various objects and scholarly theories have been proposed regarding Fenrir's relation to other canine beings in Norse mythology. Fenrir has been the subject of artistic depictions and he appears in literature.

== Attestations ==
=== Poetic Edda ===
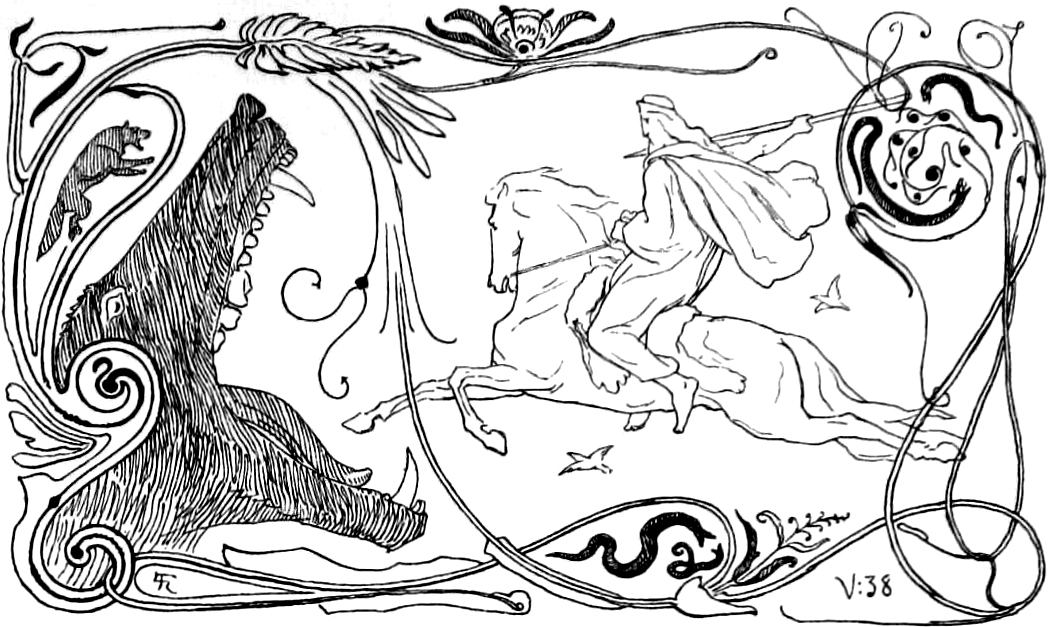
Fenrir and Odin (1895) by Lorenz Frølich

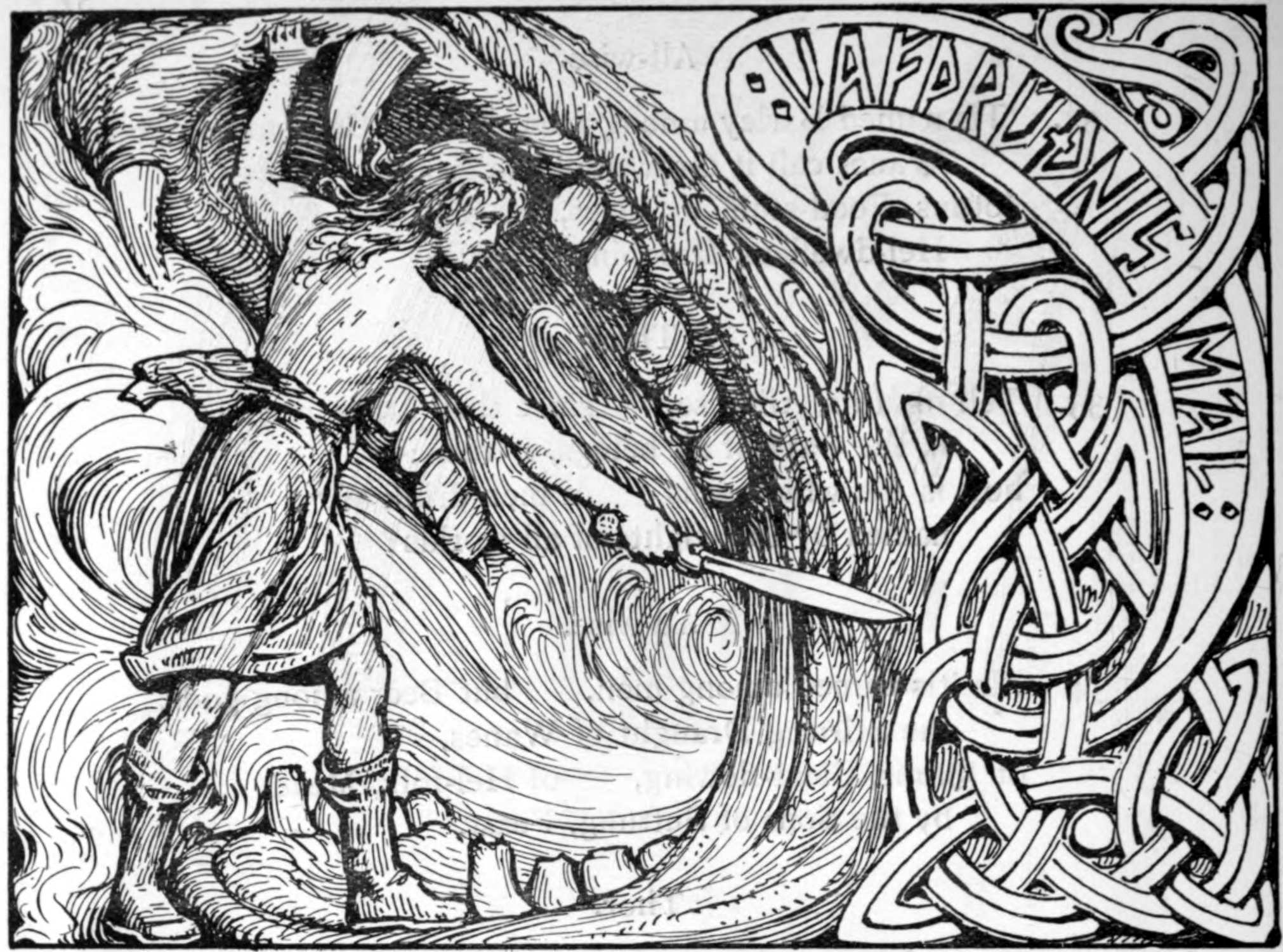
An illustration of Víðarr stabbing Fenrir while holding his jaws apart (1908) by W. G. Collingwood, inspired by the Gosforth Cross

Fenrir is mentioned in three stanzas of the poem Völuspá and in two stanzas of the poem Vafþrúðnismál. In stanza 40 of the poem Völuspá, a völva divulges to Odin that, in the east, an old woman sat in the forest Járnviðr "and bred there the broods of Fenrir. There will come from them all one of that number to be a moon-snatcher in troll's skin." Further into the poem the völva foretells that Odin will be consumed by Fenrir at Ragnarök:

Then is fulfilled Hlín's
second sorrow,
when Óðinn goes
to fight with the wolf,
and Beli's slayer,
bright, against Surtr.
Then shall Frigg's
sweet friend fall.

In the stanza that follows the völva describes that Odin's "tall child of Triumph's Sire" (Odin's son Víðarr) will then come to "strike at the beast of slaughter" and with his hands he will drive a sword into the heart of "Hveðrungr's son", avenging the death of his father.

In the first of two stanzas mentioning Fenrir in Vafþrúðnismál Odin poses a question to the wise jötunn Vafþrúðnir:

Much I have travelled, much have I tried out,
much have I tested the Powers;
from where will a sun come into the smooth heaven
when Fenrir has assailed this one?

In the stanza that follows Vafþrúðnir responds that Sól (here referred to as Álfröðull) will bear a daughter before Fenrir attacks her, and that this daughter shall continue the paths of her deceased mother through the heavens.

In the flyting poem Lokasenna verse 38, Loki insults Týr by saying he cannot deal fairly with men because "it was your right hand/ that Fenrir tore away" referring to the association between left hands and dishonesty. Týr responds in stanza 39 with references to the incident of Fenrir's binding, "I lost my hand, you the famous wolf."

=== Prose Edda ===
In the Prose Edda, Fenrir is mentioned in three books: Gylfaginning, Skáldskaparmál and Háttatal.

==== Gylfaginning chapters 13 and 25 ====
In chapter 13 of the Prose Edda book Gylfaginning, Fenrir is first mentioned in a stanza quoted from Völuspá. Fenrir is first mentioned in prose in chapter 25, where the enthroned figure of High tells Gangleri (described as King Gylfi in disguise) about the god Týr. High says that one example of Týr's bravery is that when the Æsir were luring Fenrir (referred to here as Fenrisúlfr) to place the fetter Gleipnir on the wolf, Týr placed his hand within the wolf's mouth as a pledge. This was done at Fenrir's own request because he did not trust that the Æsir would let him go. As a result, when the Æsir refused to release him, he bit off Týr's hand at a location "now called the wolf-joint" (the wrist), causing Týr to be one-handed and "not considered to be a promoter of settlements between people."

==== Gylfaginning chapter 34 ====
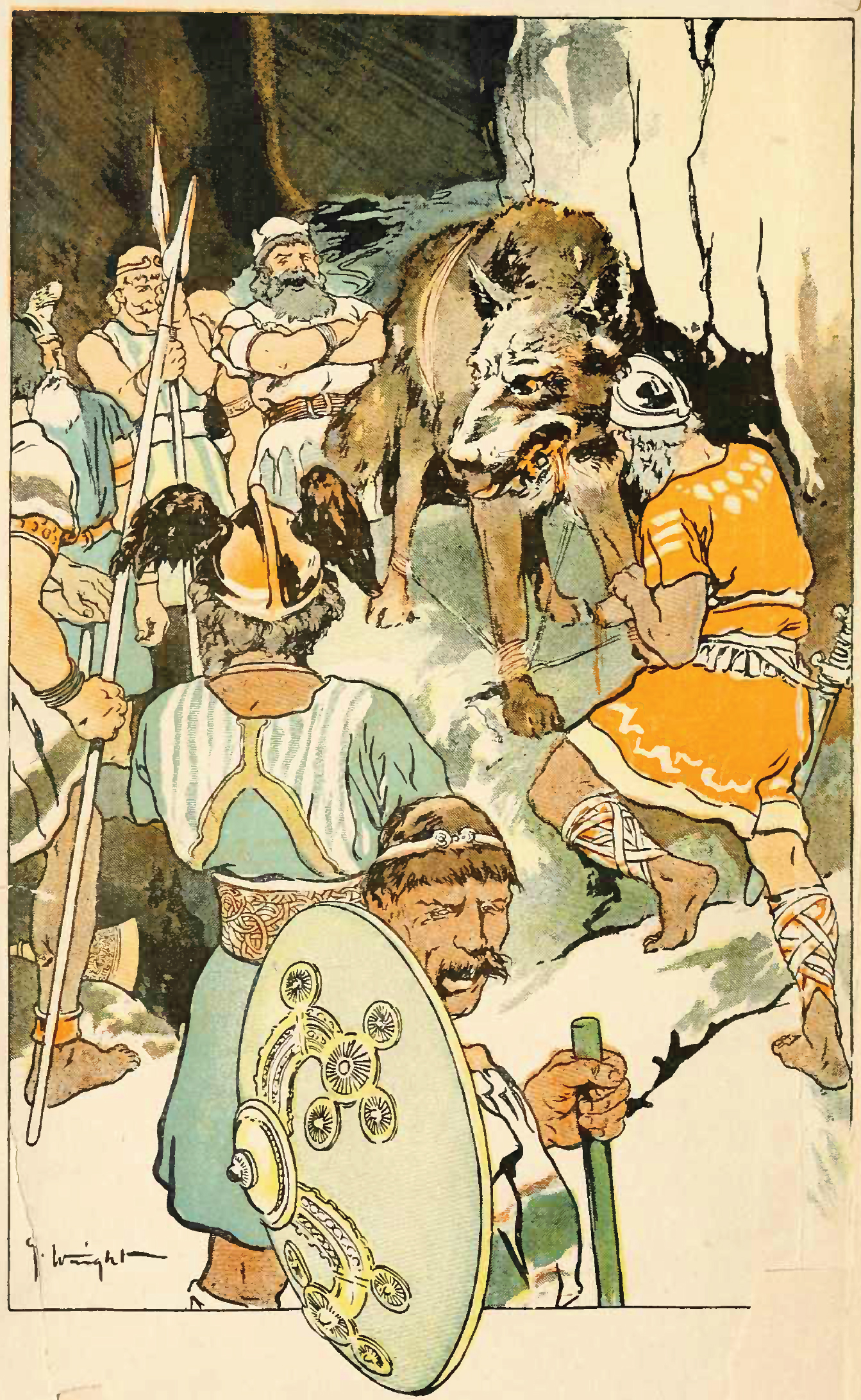
The Binding of Fenrir (1908) by George Wright

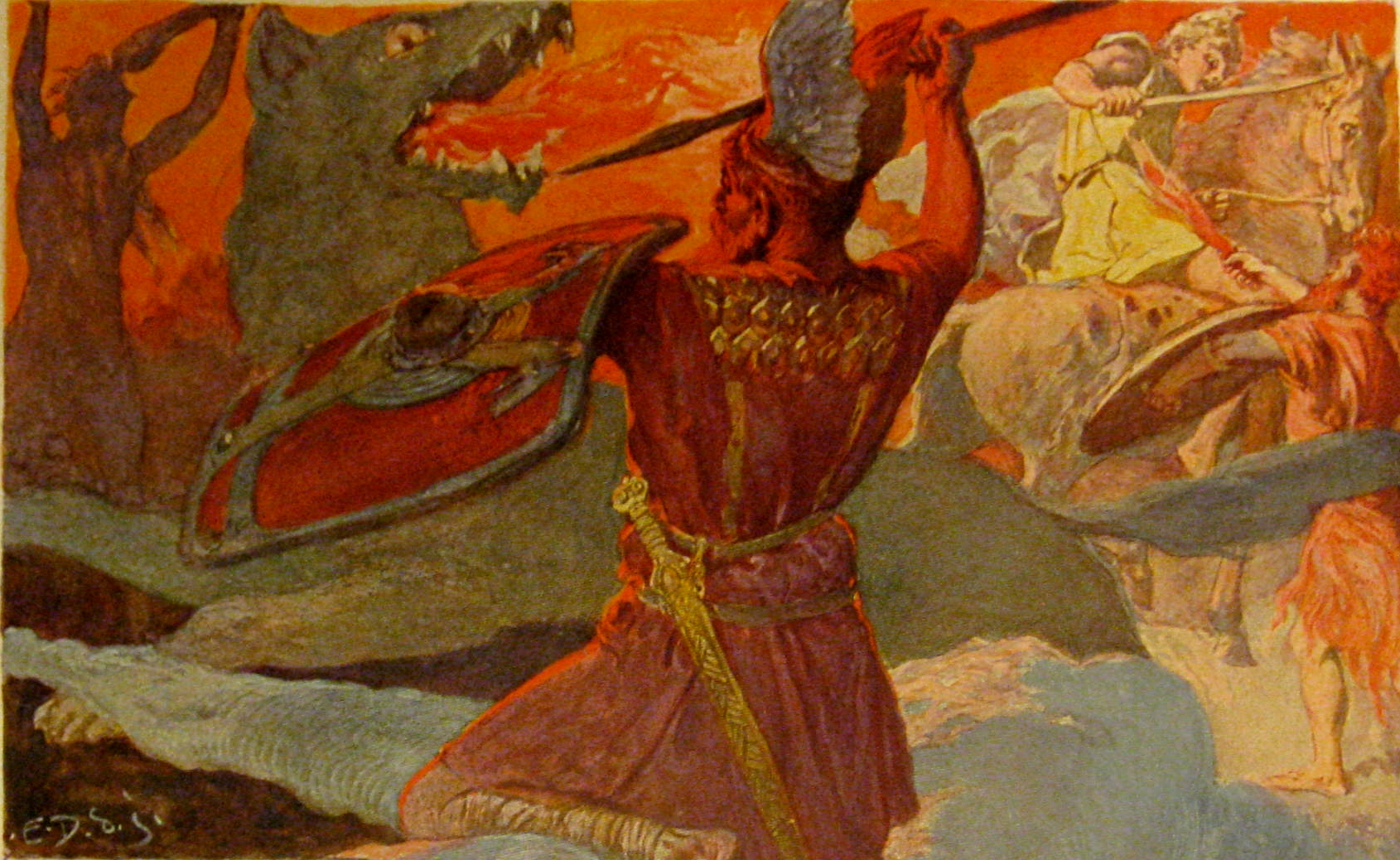
Odin and Fenriswolf, Freyr and Surt (1905) by Emil Doepler

In chapter 34, High describes Loki, and says that Loki had three children with a woman named Angrboða located in the land of Jötunheimr; Fenrisúlfr, the serpent Jörmungandr, and the female being Hel. High continues that, once the gods found that these three children were being brought up in the land of Jötunheimr, and when the gods "traced prophecies that from these siblings great mischief and disaster would arise for them" the gods expected a lot of trouble from the three children, partially due to the nature of the mother of the children, yet worse so due to the nature of their father.

High says that Odin sent the gods to gather the children and bring them to him. Upon their arrival, Odin threw Jörmungandr into "that deep sea that lies round all lands", and then threw Hel into Niflheim, and bestowed upon her authority over nine worlds. However, the Æsir brought up the wolf "at home", and only Týr had the courage to approach Fenrir, and give Fenrir food. The gods noticed that Fenrir was growing rapidly every day, and since all prophecies foretold that Fenrir was destined to cause them harm, the gods formed a plan. The gods prepared three fetters: The first, greatly strong, was called Leyding. They brought Leyding to Fenrir and suggested that the wolf try his strength with it. Fenrir judged that it was not beyond his strength, and so let the gods do what they wanted with it. At Fenrir's first kick the bind snapped, and Fenrir loosened himself from Leyding. The gods made a second fetter, twice as strong, and named it Dromi. The gods asked Fenrir to try the new fetter, and that should he break this feat of engineering, Fenrir would achieve great fame for his strength. Fenrir considered that, while the fetter was very strong, his strength had grown since he broke Leyding; and also that he would have to take some risks if he were to become famous. Fenrir allowed them to place the fetter.

When the Æsir exclaimed that they were ready, Fenrir shook himself, knocked the fetter to the ground, strained hard, and kicking with his feet, snapped the fetter – breaking it into pieces that flew far into the distance. High says that, as a result, to "loose from Leyding" or to "strike out of Dromi" have become sayings for when something is achieved with great effort. The Æsir started to fear that they would not be able to bind Fenrir, and so Odin sent Freyr's messenger Skírnir down into the land of Svartálfaheimr to "some dwarfs" and had them make a fetter called Gleipnir. The dwarves constructed Gleipnir from six mythical ingredients. After an exchange between Gangleri and High, High continues that the fetter was smooth and soft as a silken ribbon, yet strong and firm. The messenger brought the ribbon to the Æsir, and they thanked him heartily for completing the task.

The Æsir went out on to the lake Amsvartnir sent for Fenrir to accompany them, and continued to the island Lyngvi (Old Norse "a place overgrown with heather"). The gods showed Fenrir the silken fetter Gleipnir, told him to tear it, stated that it was much stronger than it appeared, passed it among themselves, used their hands to pull it, and yet it did not tear. However, they said that Fenrir would be able to tear it, to which Fenrir replied:

It looks to me that with this ribbon as though I will gain no fame from it if I do tear apart such a slender band, but if it is made with art and trickery, then even if it does look thin, this band is not going on my legs.

The Æsir said Fenrir would quickly tear apart a thin silken strip, noting that Fenrir earlier broke great iron binds, and added that if Fenrir wasn't able to break slender Gleipnir then Fenrir is nothing for the gods to fear, and as a result would be freed. Fenrir responded:

If you bind me so that I am unable to release myself, then you will be standing by in such a way that I should have to wait a long time before I got any help from you. I am reluctant to have this band put on me. But rather than that you question my courage, let someone put his hand in my mouth as a pledge that this is done in good faith.

With this statement, all of the Æsir look to one another, finding themselves in a dilemma. Everyone refused to place their hand in Fenrir's mouth until Týr put out his right hand and placed it into the wolf's jaws. When Fenrir kicked, Gleipnir caught tightly, and the more Fenrir struggled, the stronger the band grew. At this, everyone laughed, except Týr, who there lost his right hand. When the gods knew that Fenrir was fully bound, they took a cord called Gelgja (Old Norse "fetter") hanging from Gleipnir, inserted the cord through a large stone slab called Gjöll (Old Norse "scream"), and the gods fastened the stone slab deep into the ground. After, the gods took a great rock called Thviti (Old Norse "hitter, batterer"), and thrust it even further into the ground as an anchoring peg. Fenrir reacted violently; he opened his jaws very wide, and tried to bite the gods. Then the gods thrust a sword into his mouth. Its hilt touched the lower jaw and its point the upper one; by means of it the jaws of the wolf were spread apart and the wolf gagged. Fenrir "howled horribly", saliva ran from his mouth, and this saliva formed the river Ván (Old Norse "hope"). There Fenrir will lie until Ragnarök. Gangleri comments that Loki created a "pretty terrible family" though important, and asks why the Æsir did not just kill Fenrir there since they expected great malice from him. High replies that "so greatly did the gods respect their holy places and places of sanctuary that they did not want to defile them with the wolf's blood even though the prophecies say that he will be the death of Odin."

==== Gylfaginning chapters 38 and 51 ====
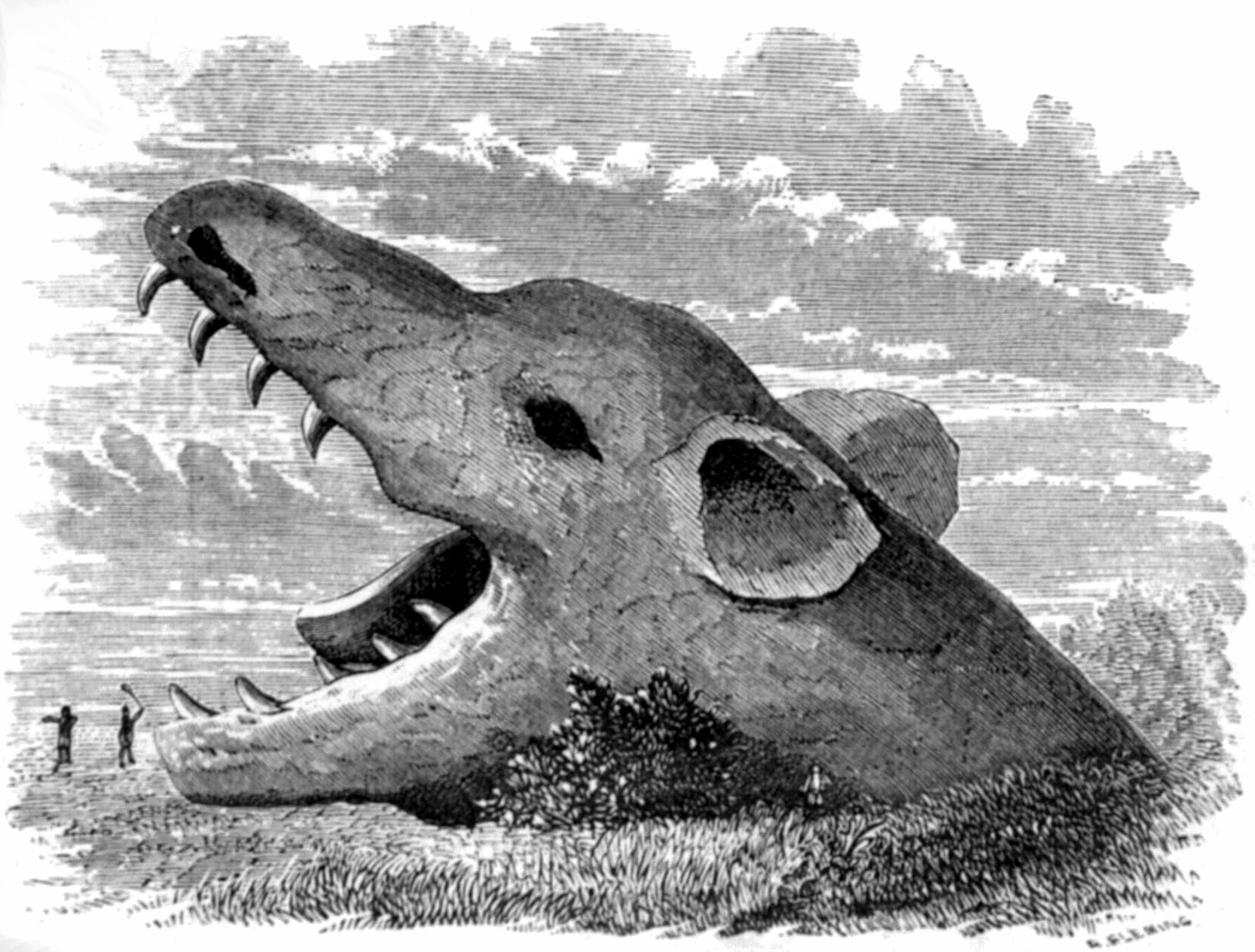
Fenrir (1874) by A. Fleming

In chapter 38, High says that there are many men in Valhalla, and many more who will arrive, yet they will "seem too few when the wolf comes". In chapter 51, High foretells that as part of the events of Ragnarök, after Fenrir's son Sköll has swallowed the sun and his other son Hati Hróðvitnisson has swallowed the moon, the stars will disappear from the sky. The earth will shake violently, trees will be uprooted, mountains will fall, and all binds will snap – Fenrisúlfr will be free. Fenrisúlfr will go forth with his mouth opened wide, his upper jaw touching the sky and his lower jaw the earth, and flames will burn from his eyes and nostrils. Later, Fenrisúlfr will arrive at the field Vígríðr with his sibling Jörmungandr. With the forces assembled there, an immense battle will take place. During this, Odin will ride to fight Fenrisúlfr. During the battle, Fenrisúlfr will eventually swallow Odin, killing him, and Odin's son Víðarr will move forward and kick one foot into the lower jaw of the wolf. This foot will bear a legendary shoe "for which the material has been collected throughout all time". With one hand, Víðarr will take hold of the wolf's upper jaw and tear apart his mouth, killing Fenrisúlfr. High follows this prose description by citing various quotes from Völuspá in support, some of which mention Fenrir.

==== Skáldskaparmál and Háttatal ====
In the Epilogue section of the Prose Edda book Skáldskaparmál, a euhemerized monologue equates Fenrisúlfr to Pyrrhus, attempting to rationalize that "it killed Odin, and Pyrrhus could be said to be a wolf according to their religion, for he paid no respect to places of sanctuary when he killed the king in the temple in front of Thor's altar." In chapter 2, "wolf's enemy" is cited as a kenning for Odin as used by the 10th century skald Egill Skallagrímsson. In chapter 9, "feeder of the wolf" is given as a kenning for Týr and, in chapter 11, "slayer of Fenrisúlfr" is presented as a kenning for Víðarr. In chapter 50, a section of Ragnarsdrápa by the 9th century skald Bragi Boddason is quoted that refers to Hel, the being, as "the monstrous wolf's sister". In chapter 75, names for wargs and wolves are listed, including both "Hróðvitnir" and "Fenrir". "Fenrir" appears twice in verse as a common noun for a "wolf" or "warg" in chapter 58 of Skáldskaparmál, and in chapter 56 of the book Háttatal. Additionally, the name "Fenrir" can be found among a list of jötnar in chapter 75 of Skáldskaparmál.

=== Heimskringla ===
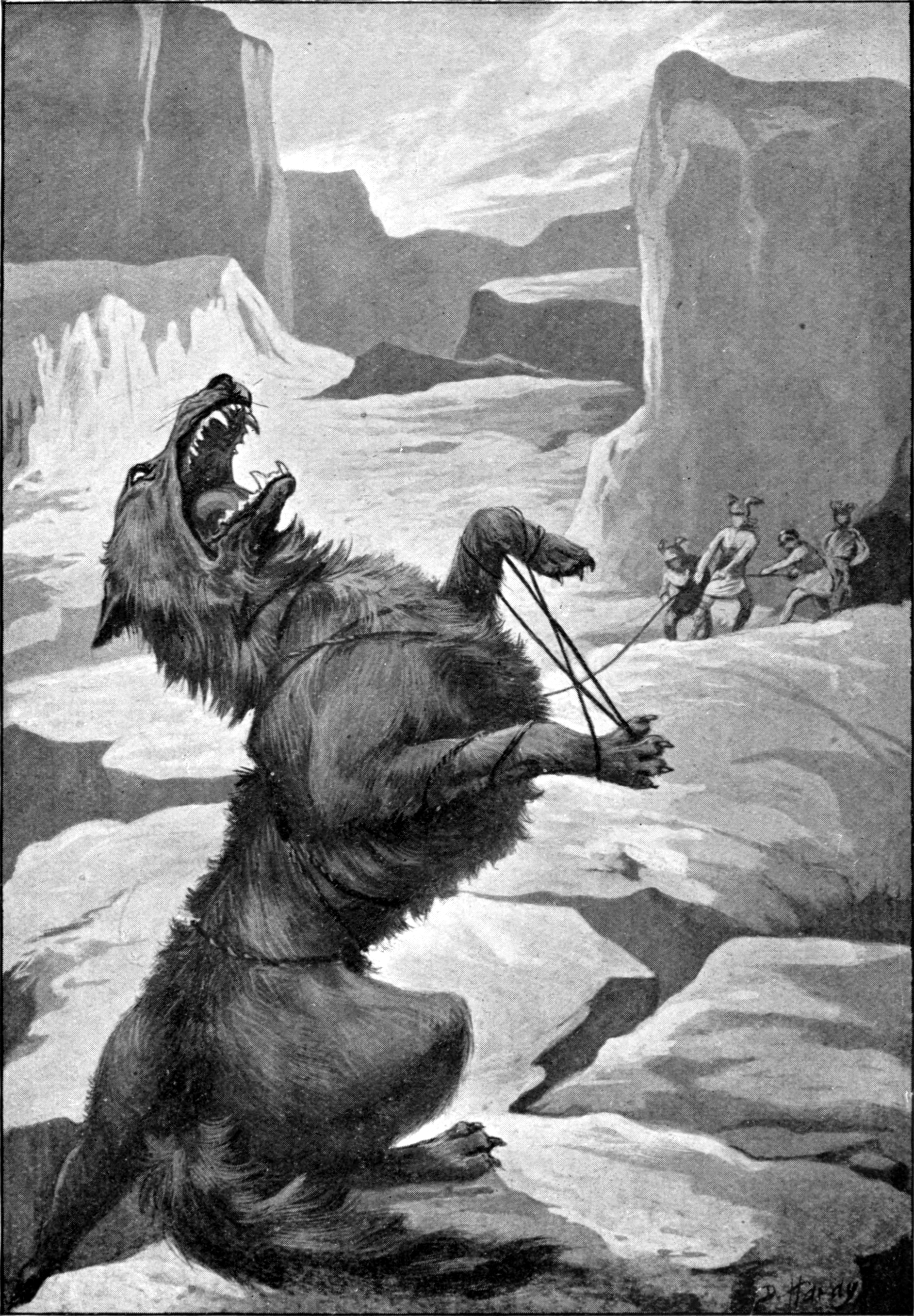
Bound of Fenrir. Dorothy Hearthy (1909).

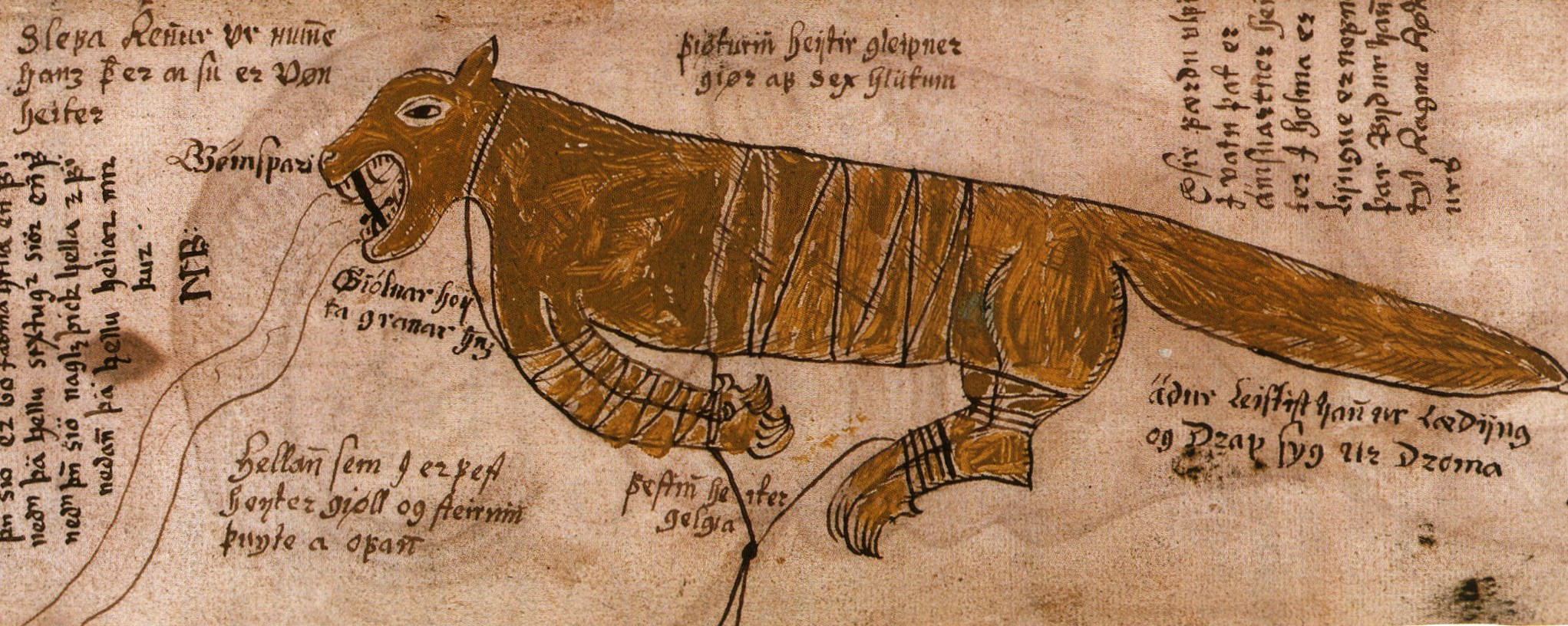
A 17th-century manuscript illustration of the bound Fenrir, the river Ván flowing from his jaws

At the end of the Heimskringla saga Hákonar saga góða, the poem Hákonarmál by the 10th century skald Eyvindr skáldaspillir is presented. The poem is about the fall of King Haakon I of Norway; although he is Christian, he is taken by two valkyries to Valhalla, and is there received as one of the Einherjar. Towards the end of the poem, a stanza relates sooner will the bonds of Fenrir snap than as good a king as Haakon shall stand in his place:

Unfettered will fare the Fenris Wolf
and ravaged the realm of men,
ere that cometh a kingly prince
as good, to stand in his stead.

== Archaeological record ==
=== Thorwald's Cross ===
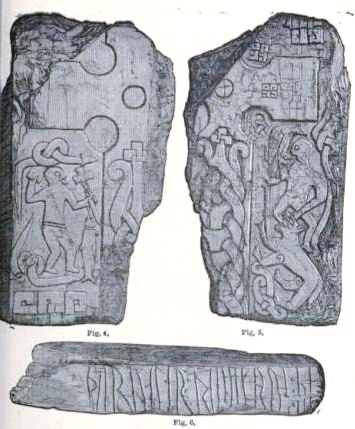
Thorwald's Cross at Kirk Andreas, Isle of Man

Thorwald's Cross, a partially surviving runestone erected at Kirk Andreas on the Isle of Man, depicts a bearded human holding a spear downward at a wolf, his right foot in its mouth, while a large bird sits at his shoulder. Rundata dates it to 940, while Pluskowski dates it to the 11th century. This depiction has been interpreted as Odin, with a raven or eagle at his shoulder, being consumed by Fenrir at Ragnarök. On the reverse of the stone is another image parallel to it that has been described as Christ triumphing over Satan. These combined elements have led to the cross as being described as "syncretic art"; a mixture of pagan and Christian beliefs.

=== Gosforth Cross ===
The mid-11th century Gosforth Cross, located in Cumbria, England, has been described as depicting a combination of scenes from the Christian Judgement Day and the pagan Ragnarök. The cross features various figures depicted in Borre style, including a man with a spear facing a monstrous head, one of whose feet is thrust into the beast's forked tongue and on its lower jaw, while a hand is placed against its upper jaw, a scene interpreted as Víðarr fighting Fenrir. This depiction has been theorized as a metaphor for Christ's defeat of Satan.

=== Ledberg stone ===
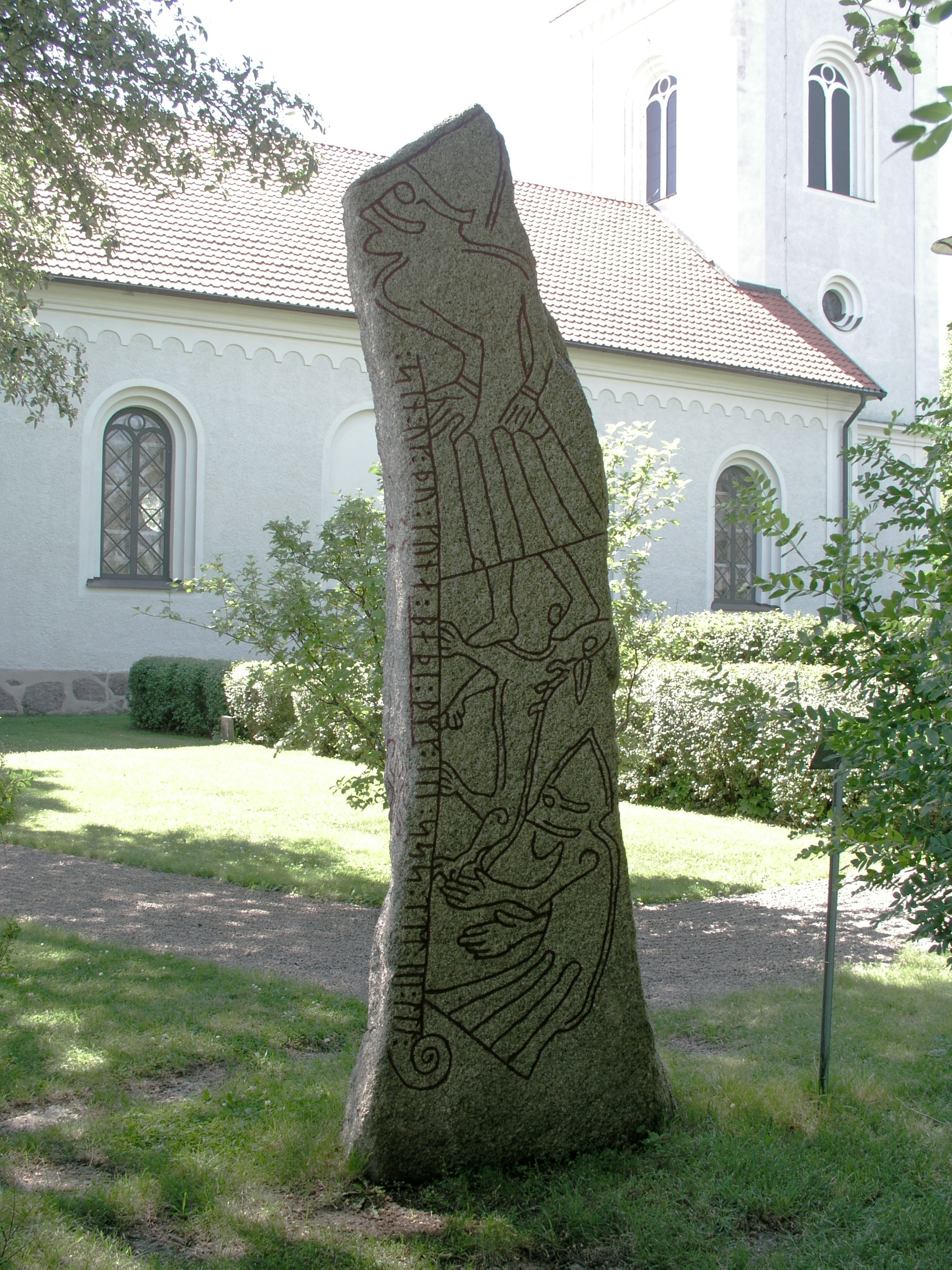
The Ledberg stone in Sweden

The 11th century Ledberg stone in Sweden, similarly to Thorwald's Cross, features a figure with his foot at the mouth of a four-legged beast, and this may also be a depiction of Odin being devoured by Fenrir at Ragnarök. Below the beast and the man is a depiction of a legless, helmeted man, with his arms in a prostrate position. The Younger Futhark inscription on the stone bears a commonly seen memorial dedication, but is followed by an encoded runic sequence that has been described as "mysterious", and "an interesting magic formula which is known from all over the ancient Norse world".

=== Other ===
If the images on the Tullstorp Runestone are correctly identified as depicting Ragnarök, then Fenrir is shown above the ship Naglfar.

Meyer Schapiro theorizes a connection between the "Hell Mouth" that appears in medieval Christian iconography and Fenrir. According to Schapiro, "the Anglo-Saxon taste for the Hell Mouth was perhaps influenced by the northern pagan myth of the Crack of Doom and the battle with the wolf, who devoured Odin."

Scholars propose that a variety of objects from the archaeological record depict Týr. For example, a Migration Period gold bracteate from Trollhättan, Sweden, features a person receiving a bite on the hand from a beast, which may depict Týr and Fenrir. A Viking Age hogback in Sockburn, County Durham, North East England may depict Týr and Fenrir.

== Theories ==
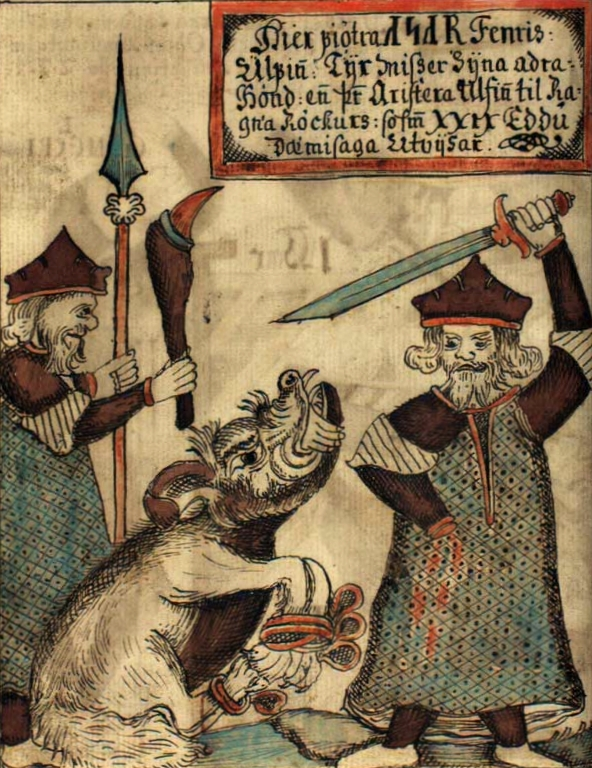
Fenrir bites off the hand of a sword-wielding Týr in an illustration on an 18th-century Icelandic manuscript

In reference to Fenrir's presentation in the Prose Edda, Andy Orchard theorizes that "the hound (or wolf)" Garmr, Sköll, and Hati Hróðvitnisson were originally simply all Fenrir, stating that "Snorri, characteristically, is careful to make distinctions, naming the wolves who devour the sun and moon as Sköll and Hati, and describing an encounter between Garm and Týr (who, one would have thought, might like to get his hand on Fenrir) at Ragnarök."

John Lindow says that it is unclear why the gods decide to raise Fenrir as opposed to his siblings Hel and Jörmungandr in Gylfaginning chapter 35, theorizing that it may be "because Odin had a connection with wolves? Because Loki was Odin's blood brother?" Referring to the same chapter, Lindow comments that in neither of the phrases does it appear that Fenrir's binding have left any other traces. Lindow compares Fenrir's role to his father Loki and Fenrir's sibling Jörmungandr, in that they all spend time with the gods, are bound or cast out by them, return "at the end of the current mythic order to destroy them, only to be destroyed himself as a younger generation of gods, one of them his slayer, survives into the new world order." He also points to Fenrir's binding as part of a recurring theme of the bound monster, where an enemy of the gods is bound, but destined to break free at Ragnarok.

Indo-European parallels have been proposed between myths of Fenrir and the Persian demon Ahriman. The Yashts refer to a story where Taxma Urupi rode Angra Mainyu as a horse for thirty years. An elaboration of this allusion is found only in a late Parsi commentary. The ruler Taxmoruw (Taxma Urupi) managed to lasso Ahriman (Angra Mainyu) and keep him tied up while taking him for a ride three times a day. After thirty years, Ahriman outwitted and swallowed Taxmoruw. In a sexual encounter with Ahriman, Jamshid, Taxmoruw's brother, inserted his hand into Ahriman's anus and pulled out his brother's corpse. His hand withered from contact with the diabolic innards. The suggested parallels with Fenrir myths are the binding of an evil being by a ruler figure and the subsequent swallowing of the ruler figure by the evil being (Odin and Fenrir), trickery involving the thrusting of a hand into a monster's orifice and the affliction of the inserted limb (Týr and Fenrir).

Ethologist Valerius Geist wrote that Fenrir's maiming and ultimate killing of Odin, who had previously nurtured him, was likely based on true experiences of wolf-behaviour, seeing as wolves are genetically encoded to rise up in the pack hierarchy and have, on occasion, been recorded to rebel against, and kill, their parents. Geist states that "apparently, even the ancients knew that wolves may turn on their parents and siblings and kill them."

== Modern influence ==
- Fenrir appears in modern literature in the poem "Om Fenrisulven og Tyr" (1819) by Adam Gottlob Oehlenschläger (collected in Nordens Guder), the novel Der Fenriswolf by K. H. Strobl, and Til kamp mod dødbideriet (1974) by E. K. Reich and E. Larsen.
- Fenrir has been depicted in the artwork Odin and Fenris (1909) and The Binding of Fenris (around 1900) by Dorothy Hardy, Odin und Fenriswolf and Fesselung des Fenriswolfe (1901) by Emil Doepler, and is the subject of the metal sculpture Fenrir by Arne Vinje Gunnerud located on the island of Askøy, Norway.
- Fenrir appears in the 2022 game God of War Ragnarök.

== See also ==
- List of wolves

== General and cited references ==
- Crumlin-Pedersen, Ole & Thye, Birgitte Munch (eds.) (1995). The Ship as Symbol in Prehistoric and Medieval Scandinavia: Papers from an International Research Seminar at the Danish National Museum, Copenhagen, 5–7 May 1994. Nationalmuseet. ISBN 87-89384-01-6
- Davidson, Hilda Ellis. 1993. The Lost Beliefs of Northern Europe. Routledge. ISBN 9780415049368
- Dronke, Ursula (Trans.) (1997). The Poetic Edda: Volume II: Mythological Poems. Oxford University Press. ISBN 0-19-811181-9.
- Faulkes, Anthony (Trans.) (1995). Edda. Everyman. ISBN 0-460-87616-3
- Hollander, Lee Milton (Trans.) (2007). Heimskringla: History of the Kings of Norway Archived 23 April 2023 at the Wayback Machine. University of Texas Press ISBN 978-0-292-73061-8
- Larrington, Carolyne (Trans.) (1999). The Poetic Edda. Oxford World's Classics. ISBN 0-19-283946-2.
- Lindow, John (2001). Norse Mythology: A Guide to Gods, Heroes, Rituals, and Beliefs. Oxford University Press. ISBN 0-19-515382-0.
- MacLeod, Mindy; Mees, Bernard (2006). Runic Amulets and Magic Objects. Boydell Press. ISBN 1-84383-205-4. Archived from the original on 19 April 2023.
- McKinnell, John. 2005. Meeting the Other in Norse Myth and Legend. D.S. Brewer. ISBN 9781843840428
- Merrony, Mark (2004). The Vikings: Conquerors, Traders and Pirates. Periplus. ISBN 1-902699-54-8.
- Orchard, Andy (1997). Dictionary of Norse Myth and Legend. Cassell. ISBN 0-304-34520-2.
- Pluskowski, Aleks (2004). "Apocalyptic Monsters: Animal Inspirations for the Iconography of Medieval Northern Devourers". In Bildhauer, Bettina; Mills, Robert (eds.). The Monstrous Middle Ages. University of Toronto Press. pp. 155–176. ISBN 0-8020-8667-5. Archived from the original on 2 May 2023.
- Puhvel, Jaan (1998). Comparative Mythology. The Johns Hopkins University Press. ISBN 0-8018-3413-9.
- Richards, Julian D. (1999). "The Scandinavian Presence". In Hunter, John; Ralston, Ian (eds.). The Archaeology of Britain: An Introduction from the Upper Palaeolithic to the Industrial Revolution. Routledge. pp. 194–209. ISBN 0-415-13587-7. Archived from the original on 2 May 2023.
- Peterson, Lena; Elmevik, Lennart; Williams, Henrik, eds. (18 September 2004). Scandinavian Runic-text Database (2004 ed.). Department of Scandinavian Languages, Uppsala University.
- Schapiro, Meyer (1942). "'Cain's Jaw-Bone that Did the First Murder'". The Art Bulletin. 24 (3): 205–212. doi:10.2307/3046829. JSTOR 3046829.
- Simek, Rudolf (2007). Dictionary of Northern Mythology. translated by Angela Hall. D.S. Brewer. ISBN 978-0-85991-513-7.
