= Frya =

Frya may brefer to:

- a Frisian goddess described in the 19th-century Oera Linda Book
- *Frijjō, the reconstructed name or epithet of a hypothetical Common Germanic love goddess
