= Ingo (disambiguation) =

Ingo and INGO may refer to:

== People ==
- Ingo, a given name
- Ingemar Johansson (1932–2009), Swedish world champion heavyweight boxer, nicknamed "Ingo"
- Ingó Veðurguð (born 1986), Icelandic singer
- Christoffer Ingo (born 1994), Finnish politician

== Other uses ==
- International non-governmental organization
- Ingo, West Virginia, an unincorporated community
- Ingo (brand), a filling station brand in Denmark and Sweden
- Ingo (novel), a children's novel by Helen Dunmore
- Ingo bike, see Eccentric-hub scooter
