= Inga (given name) =

- Gender: Female
- Name day: 5 October

Origin
- Origin: Fennoscandia

The feminine given name Inga (or Inha) is a variant of the German and Scandinavian name Inge. It derives from the Germanic deity Ing. Notable people with the name include:

- Inga of Varteig (c. 1185 – 1234), mistress of King Haakon III of Norway and the mother of King Haakon IV
- Inga Abel (1946–2000), German actress
- Inga Åberg (1773–1837), Swedish actress and singer
- Inga Abitova (born 1982) Russian long-distance runner
- Inga Afonina (born 1969), Russian diver
- Inga Alsiņa (born 1979), Latvian actress
- Inga Arshakyan (born 1982), Armenian singer
- Inga Artamonova (1936–1966), Russian speed skater
- Inga Arvad (1913–1973), Danish journalist
- Inha Babakova (born 1967), Ukrainian athlete
- Inga Balstad (born 1952), Norwegian politician
- Inga Beale (born 1963), English businesswoman
- Inga Borg (1925–2017), Swedish artist and children's book author
- Inga Bostad (born 1963), Norwegian philosopher, writer and educator
- Inga Cadranel (born 1978), Canadian actress
- Inga Clendinnen (1934–2016), Australian author, historian and anthropologist
- Inga-Stina Ewbank (1932–2004), Swedish-born academic and educator
- Inga-Britt Fredholm (1934–2016) Swedish secretary, archivist and author
- Inga Hedberg (1927–2024), Swedish botanist and academic
- Inga Houge (1856–1926), Norwegian actress
- Inga Humpe (born 1956), German singer
- Inga Janulevičiūtė (born 1985), Lithuanian figure skater
- Inga Juuso (1945–2014), Sami singer and actress
- Inga Kennedy (born 1962), Scottish nurse and senior Royal Navy officer
- Inga Rhonda King (born 1960), Saint Vincent and the Grenadines accountant, teacher and publisher
- Inga Landgré (1927–2023), Swedish actress
- Inga Likšaitė (born 1972), Lithuanian artist
- Inga Lindström (Christiane Sadlo; born 1954), German screenwriter and journalist
- Inga Lunge (born 1981), Estonian actress
- Inga Marchand (born 1978), American rapper known by her stage name Foxy Brown
- Inga Lísa Middleton (born 1964), Icelandic photographer
- Inga Moore (born 1945), Anglo-Australian author and illustrator
- Inga Muscio (born 1966), American feminist author
- Inga Nielsen (1946–2008), Danish soprano
- Inga Ruginienė (born 1981), Lithuanian trade unionist and politician, prime minister of Lithuania (2025–)
- Inga Rumpf (born 1946), vocalist of German band Frumpy
- Inga Salurand (born 1983), Estonian actress
- Inga Sempé (born 1968), French designer
- Inga-Lill Sjöblom (born 1959), Swedish politician
- Inga Swenson (1932–2023), American actress
- Inga Thompson (born 1964), American Olympic cyclist
- Inga Thorsson (1915–1994), Swedish politician and diplomat
- Inga Tidblad (1901–1975), Swedish actress
- Inga Tislar (born 1996), Estonian singer
- Inga Willis, American politician

== See also ==
- Inga (disambiguation)
- Ingvar (name)
