= Fricka =

Fricka may refer to:

== Mythology ==
- an alternative name for the mythological goddess Frigg
- an alternative name for the mythological goddess Freija
- (see also Frigg and Freyja origin hypothesis)

== Opera ==
- A character in the Ring cycle of Richard Wagner; the goddess of marriage, herself married to the chief of the Gods, Wotan

== Children's fiction ==
- Central character of a 1951–1955 series of books by M.E. Atkinson
