= Mörth =

Mörth is a surname. Notable people with the surname include:

- Ingo Mörth (born 1949), Austrian sociologist
- Tommy Mörth (born 1959), Swedish ice hockey player
