= East Danes =

East Dane is an Anglo-Saxon ethnonym which was used in the epic Beowulf.

It was also used in an Anglo-Saxon runic poem describing the first appearance of the god Frey (called Ing, see Yngvi):

Ing wæs ærest mid Eástdenum
gesewen secgum, oð he síððan eást
ofer wæg gewát. wæn æfter ran.
þus Heardingas þone hæle nemdon.

Ing was first amidst the East Danes
so seen, until he went eastward
over the sea. His wagon ran after.
Thus the Heardings named that hero.
