= Beli (moon) =

Moon of Saturn

Discovery
- Discovered by: Sheppard et al.
- Discovery date: 2019

Designations
- Pronunciation: /ˈbeɪli/
- Named after: Beli
- Alternative names: Saturn LXI; S/2004 S 30; S5612a2

Orbital characteristics
- Semi-major axis: 20424000 km
- Eccentricity: 0.113
- Orbital period (sidereal): −1084.1 days
- Inclination: 156.3°
- Satellite of: Saturn
- Group: Norse group

Physical characteristics
- Mean diameter: 4 km
- Apparent magnitude: 25.4

Beli (Saturn LXI), provisionally known as S/2004 S 30, is a natural satellite of Saturn. Its discovery was announced by Scott S. Sheppard, David C. Jewitt, and Jan Kleyna on October 7, 2019, from observations taken between December 12, 2004, and March 21, 2007. It was given its permanent designation in August 2021. On 24 August 2022, it was named after Beli, a jötunn from Norse mythology. He is killed by Freyr with the antler of a hart (stag). According to John Lindow, the myth of Beli is partially lost. Some scholars suggest that he may be the brother of Freyr's wife Gerðr, although this is uncertain.

Beli is about 4 kilometres in diameter, and orbits Saturn at an average distance of 20.396 million km in 1087.84 days, at 157.5° to the ecliptic, in a retrograde direction and with an eccentricity of 0.113.

Due to an error in the initial announcement of Beli, it was announced by the Minor Planet Center with the same orbit as Gerd. The issue was corrected later the same day.
