= Ingunar-Freyr =

Figure of Germanic mythology and religion

Ingunar-Freyr is the name given to Freyr in the Lokasenna (43) and in the Great saga of Saint Olaf.

It is often assumed that Ingunar is the West-Germanic equivalent of the Scandinavian Yngvi.

The meaning of Ingunar remains uncertain. It could be related to the Ingaevones, a Germanic tribe. Another solution is to understand Ingunar as the genitive form of Ingun, who would be a fertility goddess.

A close form, frea Ingwina ("lord of the friends of Ing") is used in Beowulf (1319), where it refers to the Danish king Hroðgar.
