= Amsvartnir =

Lake in Norse mythology

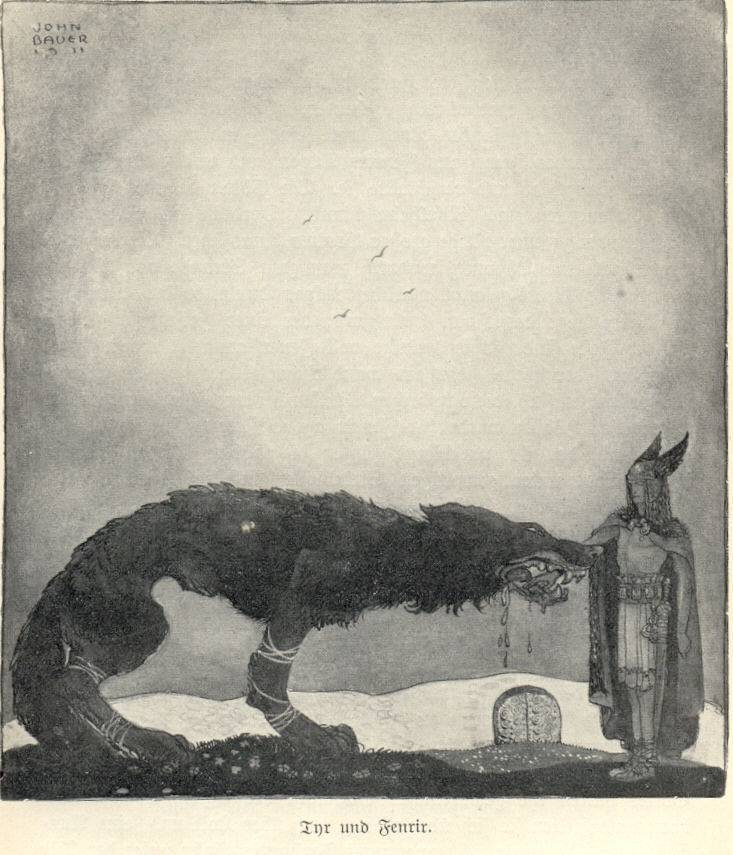

In Norse mythology, Ámsvartnir (Old Norse "pitch black") is a lake containing the island Lyngvi, where the gods bound the wolf Fenrir. The lake is only referenced in the Prose Edda, book Gylfaginning, written in the 13th century by Snorri Sturluson. In the book, the enthroned figure of High tells Gangleri (king Gylfi in disguise) that the gods and Fenrir fared across Amsvartnir to get to Lyngvi, and there bound Fenrir.

Since Amsvartnir is only mentioned in Gylfaginning, Rudolf Simek theorizes that Snorri invented the lake.
