= Beli (jötunn) =

Norse mythical character

Beli (Old Norse: [ˈbele]) is a jötunn in Norse mythology. He is said in eddic poetry to have been killed by the god Freyr.

== Name ==
The Old Norse name Beli has been translated as 'roarer'. It is related to the Old Norse weak verb belja ('to roar'; cf. Icelandic belja, Old Swedish bälia 'to roar').

== Attestations ==
=== Eddas ===
In Gylfaginning (The Beguiling of Gylfi), the god Freyr is forced to fight weaponless against the giant Beli, since he has given his sword to his servant Skírnir before sending him to court Gerðr for his master. Freyr eventually manages to kill the giant with the antler of a hart (stag).

In Völuspá (Prophecy of the Völva), Freyr is portrayed as "Beli's slayer" (bani Belja, 53).

=== Skaldic poetry ===
In Háleygjatal, written by 10th-century skald Eyvindr skáldaspillir, Freyr is called "Beli's enemy" (Belja dólgr), and Þjóðólfr of Hvinir uses the kenning "evil troop of Beli" (bölverðung Belja) in his Haustlöng.

== Theories ==
According to scholar John Lindow, the killing of Beli is part of an older myth that has been lost and "can be glimpsed only in passing".

Elsewhere in Skírnismál (The Lay of Skírnir), Gerðr complains of the slaying of her brother by Frey, which some scholars have interpreted as evidence that she was the sister of Beli. According to Orchard, "it is clear that Gerd’s reluctance to accept Frey’s favours is based in no small part on her grief for her unnamed brother, whom Frey might have killed. It is therefore possible that Beli is the brother of Gerd, although Frey’s traditional weaponlessness, most tellingly at Ragnarok against Surt, renders the identification uncertain."

== Reception ==
Saturn's moon Beli is named after him.
