= The Lesson (2014 Latvian film) =

2014 Latvian film directed by Andris Gauja

- The Lesson
- Directed by: Andris Gauja
- Written by: Lauris Gundars; Andris Gauja; Aleksandrs Grebņevs
- Produced by: Andris Gauja; Guna Stahovska; Ingrīda Nagle
- Starring: Inga Alsiņa; Mārcis Klatenbergs; Andrey Smolyakov; Gatis Gāga; Liena Šmukste; Marina Janaus; Elza Feldmane
- Production companies: Riverbed (Latvia); Horosho Production (Russia)
- Release date: August 27, 2014 (Montreal)
- Countries: Latvia, Russia
- Languages: Latvian, Russian

The Lesson (Latvian: Izlaiduma gads) is a Latvian narrative feature film directed by Andris Gauja and released in 2014. The film is Gauja's debut film. It tells the story of a young teacher, including her relationships with her students, their parents, and her loved ones.

== Synopsis ==
An attractive, ethnic Latvian Russian language teacher Zane takes a new job in the Latvian capital Riga, mentoring an unruly group of seniors who are approaching their graduation. She heroically wins her students' trust by holding drunken parties in her apartment and shrewdly takes control of the class; however, one of the male students, Maksis, then begins pursuing her. Gauja directs this suspenseful plot with subtlety and empathy, allowing this character-driven story to unfold with all the messiness of real life.

== Film Festivals ==
The Lesson has been shown at the following film festivals:

- Montreal World Film Festival – First Films World Competition Program
- Bergen International Film Festival – Extraordinary Films Program
- Kinoshock Film Festival (Russia)
- Chicago International Film Festival – World Cinema Program
- Connecting Cottbus Film Festival (Germany) – Focus "Queer East"

== Cast ==
- Inga Alsiņa as Zane
- Mārcis Klatenbergs as Maksis (Max)
- Ieva Apine as Inta
- Gatis Gāga as Uldis
- Ivars Auziņš as Ēriks (Zane's husband)
- Andrey Smolyakov as Georgiy (Georgijs, Max's father)
- Marīna Janaus as School Director
- Aigars Ligers as Olafs (Uldis's son)
- Liene Šmukste as Ināra
- Edgars Siliņš as Kristaps
- Elza Feldmane as Evita
- Agirs Neminskis as Aleksis (Alex)

== Production ==
=== Development ===
The development of this film began late in 2010, when Andris Gauja and Aleksandrs Grebņevs decided to continue their collaboration in the film industry and make a new film. This took place after the release of their award-winning film Family Instinct.

=== Screenplay ===
Andris Gauja and Lauris Gundars wrote the screenplay in collaboration.

=== Casting ===
The casting for this film was particularly difficult, because Gauja wanted to make a film that would be as realistic and credible as possible. For this reason, very few professional actors were accepted for the roles: instead, most of the characters were portrayed by amateur actors with no previous experience.

=== Filming ===
The film was shot in various real-life locations: no scenes were shot in a studio.

Most of the scenes were shot in Riga, Latvia. Two schools were used for the filming: Jāņa Poruka vidusskola and Friča Brīvzemnieka panmatskola.

=== Soundtrack ===
Tho original music for the film was written by Andris Gauja and several others.

== Release ==
'The Lesson' received its first screening at the Montreal Film festival and subsequently played at various other film festivals, including the Bergen International Film Festival in their 'Extraordinary Films Program', the Kinoshock film festival in Russia, the Chicago International Film Festival in their 'World Cinema Program' and the Connecting Cottbus Film Festival (Germany) in their 'Spectrum' section.

=== Critical reception ===
Many people who had viewed the film, especially women in their late 50s and 60s, were shocked. They described the movie as "outrageous" and claimed that it should not be available for public viewing. This was because they saw the film as an illustration of the worst experiences that could possibly be taken from school, and considered the film's plot unrealistic and untrue.

However, the opinion among younger audiences was much more positive. Younger viewers believed, on the contrary, that school life was not being reflected harshly enough by the film, since real-life situations in schools can often be much worse and far more intense.

In general, this was a film that often attracted strong opinions (whether good or bad) from its audiences.

=== Home media ===
The film was released to cinemas on Blu-ray, DVD and DCP, none of which were available for public purchase. After considerable complication with the physical discs, the authors of the film insisted on using digital formats instead.

=== Awards and nominations ===
Despite the film's unexpected success in Latvia, 'The Lesson' did not receive any Latvian nominations.

== Marketing ==
Despite the financial obstacles which the film faced, it was already a well-known topic of intense discussion amongst young people even before its premiere in Latvia.
