= Ingo Nugel =

German composer (1976–2007)

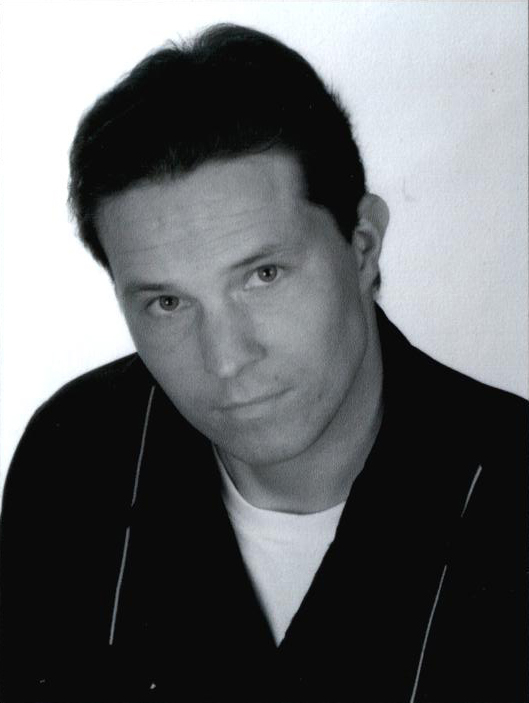
Ingo Nugel

Ingo Nugel (11 December 1976 – 25 March 2007) was a video game composer who together with his brother Henning founded Nugel Bros. Music. Together they wrote and produced music for games, short films and advertisements.

After being diagnosed with Hodgkin's lymphoma, he died on 25 March 2007 aged 30 years.

== Biography ==
Ingo Nugel was born in Dortmund on December 11, 1976. A classically trained pianist himself, he and his brother Henning founded Nugel Bros. Music in 1999. In the same year they completed their first game soundtrack for the action-strategy game “War Commander” developed by Independent Arts. From then on he and his brother composed music for several highly successful game titles as e.g. Football Manager 2002 (Electronic Arts Germany), The Moment of Silence (House of Tales/The Adventure Company), Darkstar One (Ascaron/Ubisoft) or “The Settlers II (10th Anniversary) Edition” (Funatics/Ubisoft). His music is also featured in several short films, e.g. Dronez (German Film School).

In 2004 "The Moment of Silence" was awarded the third prize in the category “Best Soundtrack” at the German Game Developer Awards. The game soundtrack was also released on CD and distributed by ZYX Music that year.

Ingo Nugel and his brother also composed the music for the award winning Audi R8 (road car) microsite.

Nugel developed a Hodgkin's lymphoma in 2005, but by the end of the year, chemotherapy seemed to have beaten it. However in November 2006 the illness returned, and Nugel went back to hospital. While there, he developed a severe pneumonia, and was moved into intensive care on March 16, 2007. In his last days, an infection took over before he died on 25 March 2007 at the university hospital in Essen. He was only 30 years old.

In August 2007 a suite of the music from „The Settlers II (10th Anniversary) Edition“ was performed on occasion of the Games Convention 2007 at the Gewandhaus in Leipzig. This year's "Symphonic Game Music Concert" which features many other famous game scores was dedicated to him.
