= Ingvar Pettersson =

Ingvar Pettersson may refer to:

- Ingvar Pettersson (racewalker) (1926–1996), Swedish athlete
- Ingvar Petersson (1922–2002), Swedish footballer
