= Ingvar Ericsson =

Ingvar Ericsson may refer to

- Ingvar Ericsson (cyclist) (1914–1995), Swedish cyclist
- Ingvar Ericsson (runner) (1927–2020), Swedish middle-distance runner
