= Ingvar Svensson =

Ingvar Svensson may refer to:

- Ingvar Svensson (footballer) (born 1939), Swedish international footballer
- Ingvar Svensson (politician) (born 1944), Swedish politician

== See also ==
- Svensson
