= Inga Alsiņa =

Latvian actress

- Born: 18 September 1979 (age 46); Cēsis, Latvian SSR
- Occupation: Actress

Inga Alsiņa (born 18 September 1979) is a Latvian actress.

She was born and raised in Cēsis and studied in the Cēsis Secondary school No.1 from 1985 until 1996. She also attended Valmiera Art college from 1993 until 1995. In 1998 she started studies at the University of Latvia in department of Geography and Earth science however she left in 2000. In 2003 she graduated Theatre department of Latvian Academy of Culture. She is married with Kalvis Lasmanis, who is a businessman.

She has worked in the Valmiera Theatre since 2001. From 2004 until 2017 she worked in the New Riga Theatre. She has also taken part in several films.

In 2004 Inga received Lielais Kristaps award as best new actress of the year. She again received the prize in 2014 as a best actress of the year for her role in the Izlaiduma gads.

== Filmography ==
Year	Film	Role	Release date (flag: country specific)	Notes
2001	Pa ceļam aizejot		2001	
2002	Sauja ložu	Daina	2002	
2003	Man patīk, ka meitene skumst		2003	
2003	Negribu, negribu, negribu		2003	
2012	Sapņu komanda 1935	Elvira Baumane	2012	
2014	Izlaiduma gads	Zane	2014	
2003	Likteņa Līdumnieki	Mirga	2003	TV series
