= Frigg and Freyja common origin hypothesis =

Old Norse Mythology

The Frigg and Freyja common origin hypothesis holds that the Old Norse goddesses Frigg and Freyja descend from a common Proto-Germanic figure, as suggested by the numerous similarities found between the two deities. Scholar Stephan Grundy comments that "the problem of whether Frigg or Freyja may have been a single goddess originally is a difficult one, made more so by the scantiness of pre-Viking Age references to Germanic goddesses, and the diverse quality of the sources. The best that can be done is to survey the arguments for and against their identity, and to see how well each can be supported."

The names Freyja and Vanir (the group of gods to which Freyja belongs) are not attested outside of Scandinavia, as opposed to the name of the goddess Frigg, who is mentioned as Frīg in Old English and as Frīja in Old High German, all stemming from Proto-Germanic *Frijjō. Although there is no similar evidence for the existence of a common Germanic goddess from which Freyja descends, some scholars have argued that this may simply be due to the scarcity of records outside of the North Germanic tradition.

== Etymology ==
It has also been suggested that the names Freyja and Frigg may stem from a common linguistic source. This theory, however, is rejected by most linguists in the field, who interpret the name Frigg as related to the Proto-Germanic verb *frijōn ('to love') and stemming from a substantivized feminine of the adjective *frijaz ('free'), whereas Freyja is regarded as descending from a feminine form of *frawjōn ('lord'). On the other hand, the names Freyja ('lady, mistress') and Freyr ('lord') are cognates stemming from the common root *frawjōn, which does not necessarily imply further relation.

== Common mythological traits ==
Both Frigg and Freyja are associated with weaving, combining the aspects of a love goddess and a domestic goddess. In Sweden and some parts of Germany, the asterism of Orion's Belt is known as her distaff or spindle.

== In popular culture ==
In the 2018 Santa Monica Studio game God of War, and in its 2022 sequel God of War Ragnarök the character Freyja is frequently referred to as Frigg. The stated reason in game is whenever she accomplished something, Odin would attribute it to Frigg in an attempt to shroud her accomplishments under the Aesir banner.

In the universe of Marvel Comics, Frigga, the adopted mother of Thor, and the Asgardian goddess Freya were initially written as different characters. Beginning with Loki: Agent of Asgard in 2015, Frigga has exclusively used the name Freyja, although a separate character with the name "Freya" has also made scarce appearances.
