= Names of God in Old English poetry =

Descriptive epithets

In Old English poetry, many descriptive epithets for God were used to satisfy alliterative requirements. These epithets include:

== List ==
Main	Name (Old English)	Name meaning	Attestations
Cyning "King"	wuldres Cyning	"King of Glory"	The Dream of the Rood
Dryhten "Lord"	ece Dryhten	"eternal Lord"	Cædmon's hymn
Dryhten "Lord"	dryhntes dreamas	"the joys of the Lord"	The Seafarer
Dryhten "Lord"	heofones Dryhten	"heaven's Lord"	The Dream of the Rood
Ealdor "Prince"	wuldres Ealdor	"Prince of Glory"	The Dream of the Rood
Fæder "Father"	Heahfæder	"Highfather"	The Dream of the Rood
Fæder "Father"	Wuldorfæder	"Glorious Father"	Cædmon's hymn
Frea "Lord"	Frea ælmihtig	"Master almighty"	Cædmon's hymn
Frea "Lord"	Frea mancynnes	"Mankind's Master"	The Dream of the Rood
God "God"	God ælmihtig	"God almighty"	The Dream of the Rood
God "God"	weruda God	"God of hosts"	The Dream of the Rood
Hælend "Healer"	Hælend	"Healer"	The Dream of the Rood
Metod "Maker"	Metod	"Maker"	Beowulf (110)
Metod "Maker"	eald Metod	"Old Maker"	Beowulf (945)
Wealdend "Ruler"	Wealdend	"Ruler"	The Dream of the Rood
Wealdend "Ruler"	Al-wealda	"all-ruler"	Meters of Boethius (11)
Wealdend "Ruler"	wuldor alwealda	"Glorious all-ruler"	Codex Exoniensis
Wealdend "Ruler"	fæder alwealda	"Father all-ruler"	Beowulf (630)
Weard "Guard"	heofonrices Weard	"the heavenly kingdom's Guard"	Cædmon's hymn
Weard "Guard"			Beowulf

"Ælmihtiga," "Drihten," "Metod," as they appear in the Beowulf.

== See also ==
- Name of God in Christianity
- Wuldor
- List of kennings
- List of names of Odin
- List of names of Freyr
