= Ingo Brigandt =

Canadian philosopher

- Awards: Dorothy J. Killam Memorial Postdoctoral Fellow Prize; Martha Cook Piper Research Prize; Faculty of Arts Research Excellence Award

Education
- Education: University of Pittsburgh (Ph.D.); University of Konstanz (M.Sc.)
- Thesis: A Theory of Conceptual Advance: Explaining Conceptual Change in Evolutionary, Molecular, and Evolutionary Developmental Biology (2006)
- Doctoral advisor: Paul E. Griffiths, Anil Gupta

Philosophical work
- Era: 21st-century philosophy
- Region: Western philosophy
- School: Analytic
- Institutions: University of Alberta
- Main interests: philosophy of biology, philosophy of science, philosophy of mind
- Website: https://sites.ualberta.ca/~brigandt/

Ingo Brigandt is a German Canadian philosopher and Canada Research Chair in Philosophy of Biology at the University of Alberta. He is an executive editor of the Canadian Journal of Philosophy and an associate editor of Journal of Experimental Zoology Part B: Molecular and Developmental Evolution. Brigandt has held various grants and fellowships from the Andrew Mellon Foundation, Social Sciences and Humanities Research Council, Konrad Lorenz Institute for Evolution and Cognition Research, and the University of Alberta.

== See also ==
- Heterochrony
- Reductionism
- Gavin de Beer
- Modern synthesis (20th century)
- Homology (biology)
- Evolutionary developmental biology
- Antireductionism
