= Ingá Stone =

Rock formation and archaeological site in Brazil

Ingá Stone Pedra do Ingá Itacoatiara do Ingá
- Rock formation
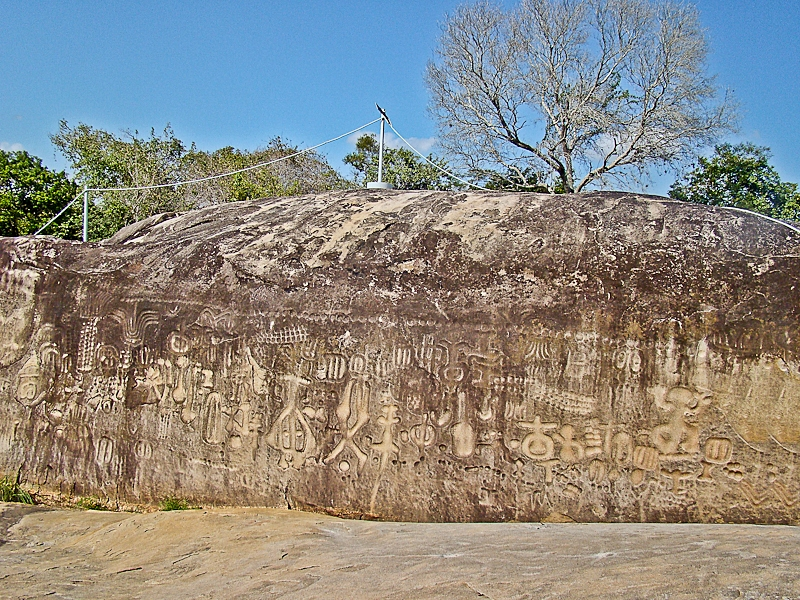
- Carved inscriptions on the Ingá Stone

- Location within Brazil
- Coordinates: 7.3253°S 35.5857°W
- Location: Near Ingá, Paraíba, Brazil
- Water bodies: Ingá River

Area
  - Total: 250 square metres (2,700 sq ft)

Dimensions
  - Length: 46 meters (151 ft)
  - Height: 3.8 meters (12 ft)

The Ingá Stone (Pedra do Ingá in Portuguese) is located in the middle of the Ingá River near the small city of Ingá, 96 kilometres (60 mi) from João Pessoa, in Paraíba State in the northeast of Brazil. The Ingá Stone is also called Itacoatiara do Ingá. The word Ita means "stone" in the Tupi language of the natives that lived in that area. It is a rock formation in gneiss which covers an area of approximately 250 square metres (2,700 sq ft). Altogether primary, a vertical wall 46 meters (151 ft) long by 3.8 meters (12 ft) high, and adjacent areas, there are entries whose meanings are unknown. Several figures are carved in low relief in this set, suggesting the representation of animals, fruits, and astronomical features like the constellation Orion and the Milky Way.

It is composed of some basalt stones covered with symbols and glyphs which are yet undeciphered. Scholars think it was created by natives that lived in the area until the 18th century. Unfortunately, the site is under constant danger of being damaged beyond repair by scavengers and vandals.

Most glyphs represent animals, fruits, humans, constellations, and other unrecognizable images.

== Archeoastronomical hypothesis ==
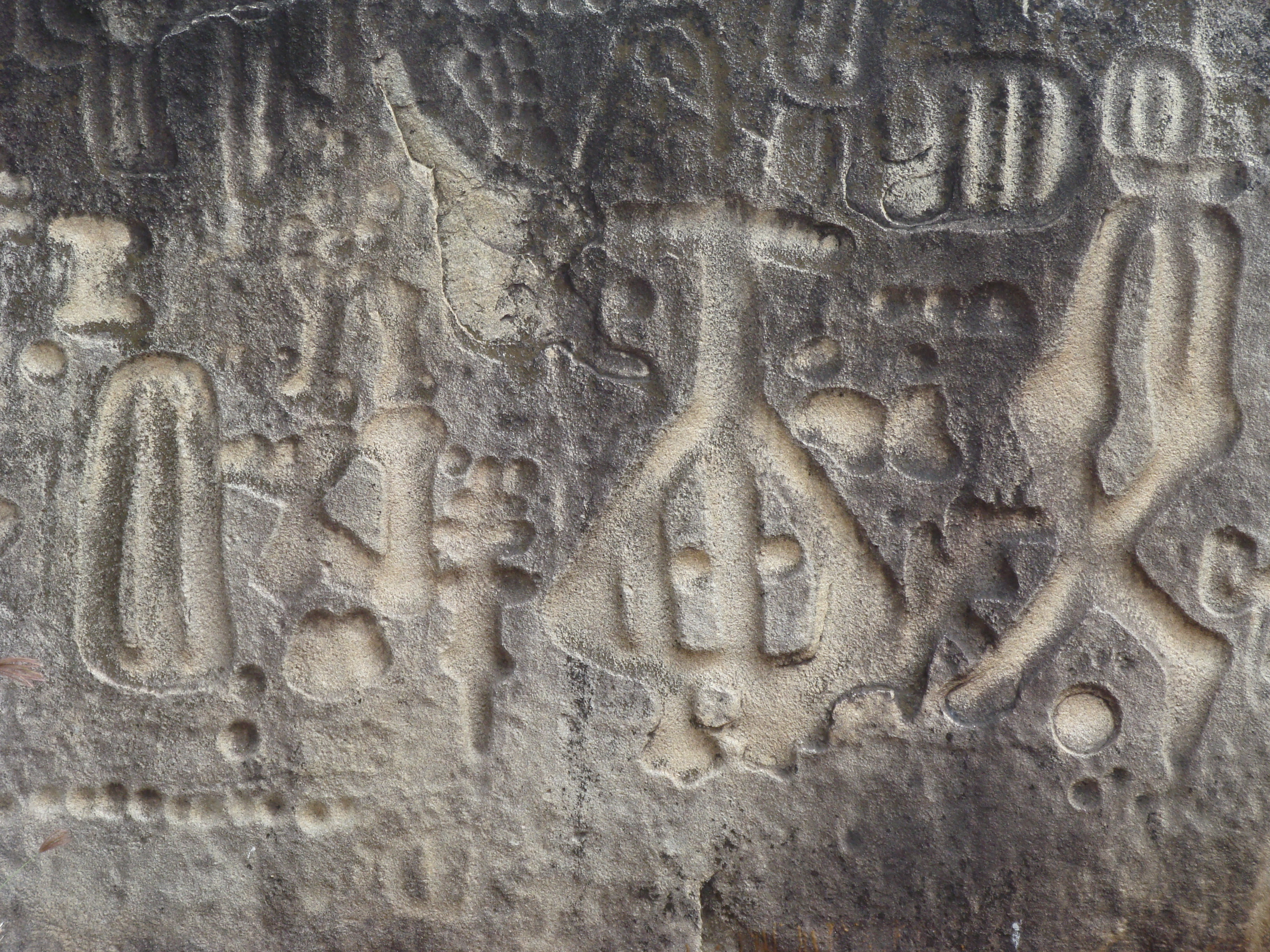
Glyph detail

There is a hypothesis that provides petroglyphs of Ingá an exceptional importance from the archeoastronomical point of view. In 1976, the Spanish engineer Francisco Pavía Alemany started a mathematical study of this archaeological monument. The first results were published in 1986 by the Instituto de Arqueologia Brasileira. He identified in Inga a series of "bowls" and another petroglyph etched into the vertical surface of the wall of Inga that formed a "solar calendar", over which a gnomon projected the shadow of the first solar rays of every day. The Agrupación Astronómica de la Safor published in 2005 a summary of this work in its official bulletin.

Later, Pavía continued the study, focusing this time on a series of signs engraved on the rocky surface, which he interpreted as a large number of "stars" grouped forming "constellations". The coexistence of the "bowls" and the "constellations" in the same rock are thought to give it archaeoastronomical significance.

In 2006, the Egyptologist and archaeoastronomer Jose Lull coordinated the publication of a book entitled Trabajos de Arqueoastronomía. Ejemplos de Africa, America, Europe y Oceania, a compendium of thirteen articles written by archeoastronomers. Among these items are "The archeoastronomical ensemble of Inga" where is exposed the study of both the bowls and constellations mentioned before and the reasons that justify Inga as an exceptional archeoastronomic monument, like no other in the world.

== Bibliography ==
- Pavía, Alemany F. (1986): El Calendario solar Da pedra de Ingá. Una hipótesis de trabajo. Boletim serie ensayos nov/86. Instituto de Arqueología Brasileira. Río de Janeiro.
- Pavía, Alemany F. (2005): La Itacoatiara de Ingá, un registro astronómico. Huygens Nº 53. Agrupación Astronómica de la Safor.
- Lull, José, ed. (2006). Trabajos de Arqueoastronomía: Ejemplos de África, América, Europa y Oceanía.
