= Álfröðull =

Term and common kenning in Norse mythology

Álfröðull (Old Norse "elf-beam", "elf-disc" or "elf-glory, elf-heaven") is a term and common kenning in Norse mythology. It is ambiguous, referring both to the sun-chariot of the sun goddess Sól (for example, Alfröðull is said to shine in Skírnismál, verse 4) and to the rider (Sól herself). Álfröðull is pulled by two horses, Árvakr and Alsviðr. The chariot is pursued by the wolf Sköll. According to Norse mythology, prior to Ragnarök, Álfröðull will give birth to a daughter and after she is eaten by the wolf, the daughter will take her place.

== Vafþrúðnismál ==
According to the poem Vafþrúðnismál, verses 46–47:

Óðinn kvað:

"Hvaðan kemr sól
á inn slétta himin,
er þessa hefr Fenrir farit?"

Vafþrúðnir kvað:

"Eina dóttur
berr Alfröðull,
áðr hana Fenrir fari;
sú skal ríða,
þá er regin deyja,
móður brautir, mær."

Benjamin Thorpe's translation:

Gagnrâd:

"Whence will come the sun
in that fair heaven,
when Fenrir has this devoured?"

Vafthrûdnir:

"A daughter
shall Alfrodull bear,
ere Fenrir shall have swallowed her.
The maid shall ride,
when the powers die,
on her mother's course."

Snorri Sturluson cites this passage in his account of Ragnarök in the Gylfaginning section of his Prose Edda.

== Skaldic verse ==
Álfröðull also occurs as a kenning for the sun in skaldic verse; the simplex, röðull, is used with the same meaning, and Alaric Hall therefore suggests in his book on the elves that the choice of "álfröðull" depended on alliteration, but that the existence of the kenning suggests that the concepts of the sun and the elves were "semantically congruent"; he considers the álfr (elf) in "álfröðull" possibly a heiti for Freyr.
