= Ingá, Paraíba =

Coordinates: 7°16′04″S 35°36′46″W

- Municipality
- Flag Coat of arms

- Location of Ingá in Paraíba and Brazil.
- Country: Brazil
- Region: Northeast
- State: Paraíba
- Mesoregion: Agreste Paraibano
- Founded: November 3, 1840

Government
  - Mayor: Manoel "da Lenha" Batista Chaves Filho (PSD)

Population (2020)
  - Total: 18,144
- Time zone: UTC−3 (BRT)

Ingá (Central northeastern portuguese pronunciation: [ĩˈɡa]) is a municipality in the state of Paraíba in the Northeast Region of Brazil.

A notable landmark of Ingá is the Ingá Stone, a rock with huge pre-Columbian inscriptions which are still undeciphered.

== See also ==
- List of municipalities in Paraíba
