= *Frijjō =

Germanic love goddess

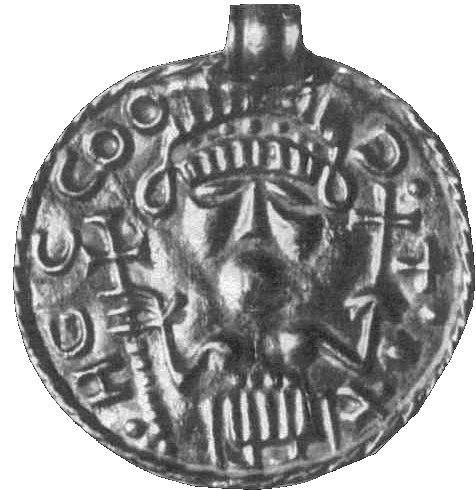
The Welschingen-B bracteate (IK 389)

*Frijjō ("Frigg-Frija") is the reconstructed name or epithet of a hypothetical Common Germanic love goddess, the most prominent female member of the *Ansiwiz (gods), and often identified as the spouse of the chief god, *Wōdanaz (Woden-Odin).

== Proposed etymology ==
The name *Frijjō (Old Norse Frigg, Old High German Frīja) ultimately derives from Proto-Indo-European *prih-y(a)h, cognate to Sanskrit priya 'dear, beloved'. However, in the Germanic languages, the word's meaning split into two etymons: one related to the semantic field of 'love, courtship, friendship' (English friend), whereas the other to the field of 'freedom' (English free). Other cognates are:

- Gothic frijôn - translates φιλειν, αγαπαν 'to love'.
- Anglo-Saxon freogan, freon.
- Old Saxon friehan.
- Modern Germanic words for friend, such as Freund.

The Old High German verb frijôn 'nubere, uxorem ducere, woo, to take a wife' (Modern German freien) contrasts with frijan 'liberare'. It is foreign to Upper German, and was probably adopted from Low German.

== Derivations ==
The theonyms in West Germanic are Anglo-Saxon *Frīg, Old High German Frīja, Low German (Lower Saxony) Frike, Freke (Fru Freen, Fru Frien, Fru Freke, Fru Frick, Fuik, Frie) and Lombardic Frea, attested in the Origo Gentis Langobardorum. The name of the Anglo-Saxon goddess is attested only in the name of the weekday, although frīg (strong feminine) as a common noun meaning 'love' (in the singular) or 'affections, embraces' (in the plural) is attested in poetry.

The weekday Friday in English is named after the goddess Frigg (Old English frigedæg). Friday in Old Norse was called Frjádagr, originated in the South Germanic form of the Goddess, in modern Faröese it is called fríggjadagur. The form freyjudag is an exception attested in the Breta sögur. In Old High German there are no relations of the weekday to Freya (which would have been *Frouwûntac), the usual forms being derived from Frija: Frîatac, Frîjetac, now Freitag.

== Poetic epithets ==
There is some evidence that the epithet *frawjō 'lady' was applied to this goddess. The two names were confused from early times, especially in Old English, where the stem of *frīj- appears as frēo-, frīo-, frēa- (a contraction of *īj- and a following back vowel) beside a less frequent stem form frīg- (/fri:j-/), by development of a glide between ī and a following front vowel. The two forms would originally have figured in complementary distribution within the same paradigm (e.g. masculine nominative singular frēo, masculine genitive singular frīges), but in attested Old English analogical forms are already present and the distribution is no longer complementary

In regards to the question, Jacob Grimm stated:

We gather from all this, that the forms and even the meanings of the two names border closely on one another. Freyja means the gladsome, gladdening, sweet, gracious goddess, Frigg the free, beautiful, loveable; to the former attaches the general notion of frau (mistress), to the latter that of frî (woman).

The linguistic discussion of these names is complicated by issues of Germanic Verschärfung. Old Norse Frigg, friggjar-dagr is related to frakkr 'free, bold', cognate to Old English frēo, Gothic freis 'free'.

== Characteristics ==
Both Frigg and Freyja are associated with weaving, combining the aspects of a love goddess and a domestic goddess.

In Sweden and some parts of Germany, the asterism of Orion's Belt is known as her distaff or spindle.

== B7 bracteates ==
The "woman" type of bracteates (Frauenbrakteaten, type B7, also called Fürstenberg or Oberwerschen type) has been identified as possibly depicting Frigg-Frija.

There are five known bracteates of this type: IK 259 (Großfahner-B); IK 311 (Oberwerschen-B); IK 350 (site of discovery unknown, reportedly from "south-western Germany"); IK 389 (Welschingen-B); and IK 391 (Gudme II-B). In each of them the female figure depicted is holding a cross-shaped staff, interpreted as a distaff. IK 350 is additionally decorated with a number of crosses, and IK 259 has additional swastikas. Iconographically related are five gold bracteates found in Hüfingen, Bavaria.

== See also ==
- Dís
- Freyja
- Frigg
- Frigg and Freyja origin hypothesis
- Holda
- Perchta
