= Ingo Mörth =

Austrian sociologist

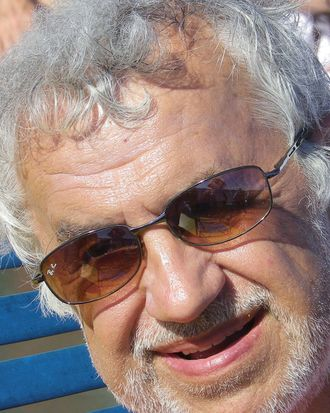
- Self portrait, 2014
- Born: 1949 (age 76–77); Grades, Republic of Austria

Academic background
- Education: JKU
- Thesis: (1977)

Academic work
- Discipline: Sociology
- Website: ingomoerth.at

Ingo Mörth (born 1949 in Grades, Austria) is an Austrian sociologist.

== Biography ==
Between 1968-1976 Mörth studied business administration and sociology at the Johannes Kepler University Linz (JKU) and achieved his PhD in sociology there in 1977. 1973 he started his scientific career as an assistant professor at the Department of General Sociology and Social Philosophy at the JKU, and spent a term as visiting professor at the Central Connecticut State University in New Britain, Connecticut in 1978. After achieving 1984 his "Habilitation" (= venia docendi) for sociology at the JKU he taught as associate professor (since 1997) and full professor (since 2002) at the Department of Sociology at the Johannes Kepler University Linz, where he also was head of the Institute of Cultural Economics and Cultural Research. 2011 he retired from JKU, but is still affiliated as lecturer and researcher there

== Work ==
His main working areas are Sociological theory, sociology of culture, sociology of art, sociology of media, sociology of religion, research in leisure and tourism and in the sociology of education. He is known beyond the German-speaking scientific community especially in the fields of a sociology of religion, sociological theory and sociology of culture.

His theory of religion is a theory of contingency of human existence covered by transcending concepts of meaning, thus making different systems of meaning comparable as religious equivalents. His theory of society as theory of culture defines culture as a main thread of change in modern and post-modern societies, whereas his empirical research looks into the intertwinedness of culture, tourism and leisure.

Mörth founded and developed together with Gerhard Fröhlich three multilingual online websites on famous social scientists: Pierre Bourdieu, Norbert Elias and Clifford Geertz.

Recently Mörth concentrated on theory and research in the Sociology of Media and the Sociology of Arts, and he was also involved in the planning and development of several projects in the field of arts and culture.

== Publications (selection) ==
- Die gesellschaftliche Wirklichkeit von Religion. Grundlegung einer allgemeinen Religionstheorie, Stuttgart etc. 1978: Kohlhammer, ISBN 3-17-004359-5 (title: "The social reality of religion: principles of a general theory of religion")
- Religionssoziologie (with Friedrich Fürstenberg), in: René König (ed.): Handbuch der empirischen Sozialforschung, vol. 14: Religion, Bildung, Medizin, Stuttgart 1979: Enke, pp. 1–84, ISBN 3-432-89382-5 (title: "Sociology of religion", in: "Handbook of emiprical sociology")
- The Sociology of Religion als Critical Theory, in: Acts of the 15th CISR/ ISSR Conference, Venice 1979: Religion and Politics, CISR acts vol. 15 (1979), pp. 263–266 (ISSN 1461-7404)
- La sociologie de la religion comme Théorie Critique (L'École de Francfort), in: Social Compass. International Review of Sociology of Religion/ Revue internationale de sociologie de la religion, vol. XXVII (1980) no. 1, pp. 27–50 (ISSN 0037-7686)
- Lebenswelt und religiöse Sinnstiftung. Ein Beitrag zur Theorie des Alltagslebens, Munic 1986: tuduv, ISBN 3-88073-192-6 (title: "Life-world and religious meaning: a contribution to the sociology of everyday life")
- Kultur im Lebensraum Stadt. Theoretische und empirische Perspektiven am Beispiel Linz (ed. with Wilhelm Rausch), Linz/D. 1986: Trauner, ISBN 3-85320-372-8 (title: "Culture in urban space: theoretical and empirical perspectives by the example of Linz/Austria")
- Zeit als Strukturelement von Lebenswelt und Gesellschaft (ed. with Friedrich Fürstenberg), Linz 1986: Trauner, ISBN 3-85320-373-6 (title: "Time as structure of life-world and society")
- Fondamenti e linee di sviluppo di una teoria critica della religione, in: Alberto Bondolfi, Roberto Cipriani (red.), Jürgen Habermas, Benjamin R. Mariante, Ingo Mörth, Roberto Vinco: La teoria critica della religione. Il fenomeno religioso nell' analisi della Scuola di Francoforte, Edizioni Borla, Rome 1986, pp. 116–182, ISBN 88-263-0623-0
- Elements of Religious Meaning in Science-Fiction-Literature, in: Social Compass. International Review of Sociology of Religion/ Revue internationale de sociologie de la religion, vol. XXXIV (1987) no. 1, pp. 27–50 (ISSN 0037-7686)
- NEW AGE – Neue Religion? Theoretische Überlegungen und empirische Hinweise zur sozialen Bedeutung des Wendezeit-Syndroms, in: Max Haller, Hans-Joachim Hoffmann-Nowotny, Wolfgang Zapf (eds.): Kultur und Gesellschaft. Verhandlungen des 24. Deutschen Soziologentages, des 11. Österreichischen Soziologentages und des 8. Kongresses der Schweizerischen Gesellschaft für Soziologie in Zürich 1988, Frankfurt/M. etc. 1989: Campus, pp. 297–320, ISBN 3-59334-156-5 (title: "New Age – new religion? Theoretical and empirical considerations on the social significance of the new age syndrome")
- Review on: Beckford, James A.: Religion and Advanced Industrial Society, London 1989, in: European Sociological Review, vol. 7 (1991) no. 1, pp. 93–95 (ISSN 0266-7215)
- Der unendliche Prozeß der Zivilisation. Zur Kultursoziologie der Moderne nach Norbert Elias (ed. with Helmut Kuzmics), Frankfurt/M. etc. 1991: Campus, ISBN 3-593-34481-5 (title: "The never ending process of civilisation: on the sociology of culture after Norbert Elias")
- Über die Neuausgabe eines wichtigen Buches: Thomas Luckmann "Die Unsichtbare Religion", in: Schweizerische Zeitschrift für Soziologie/ Revue suisse de sociologie, vol. 19 no. 3, pp. 627–634 (ISSN 0379-3664), (title: "On the re-edition of an important book: Thomas Luckmann's 'Invisible religion'")
- Das symbolische Kapital der Lebensstile. Zur Kultursoziologie der Moderne nach Pierre Bourdieu (ed. with Gerhard Fröhlich), Frankfurt/M. etc. 1994: Campus, ISBN 978-3-593-34964-0 (title: "The symbolic capital of life-styles: on the sociology of culture after Pierre Bourdieu")
- Kulturerlebnis Stadt. Theoretische und praktische Aspekte der Stadtkultur (ed. with Birgit Brandner, Kurt Luger), Vienna 1994: Picus, ISBN 3-85452-124-3 (title: "Experiencing culture in urban environments: theoretical and practical aspects of urban culture")
- Symbolische Anthropologie der Moderne. Kulturanalysen nach Clifford Geertz (ed. with Gerhard Fröhlich), Frankfurt/M. etc. 1998: Campus, ISBN 3-593-35890-5 (title: "Symbolic anthropology of modernity: cultural analyses after Clifford Geertz")
- Kunst und Tourismus im ländlichen Raum. Chancen und Risken (editor), Linz 1999: KUWI-Verlag, ISBN 3-902050-00-4 (title: "Art and tourism in rural areas: chances and risks")
- UTOPIA 2001: Space Odysseys as Religion, in: Organdi Quartlery. An online peer-reviewed interdisciplinary journal, issue no. 3, October 2001, (ISSN 1630-7712)
- Kulturtourismus – Kultur des Tourismus: Eine Verbindung von Kulturen? (editor), in: Trans no. 15, April 2004, online only (title: "Cultural tourism and the culture of tourism: a way of bringing cultures together?") (ISSN 1560-182X)
- Niedrigqualifizierte in Oberösterreich – der Weg in die Weiterbildung (with others), Linz 2005: Amt der oö. Landesregierung (title: "Less qualified people in Upper Austria and their way into continuing education")
- Wissensspeicher, Suchmaschinen und Orte des Lernens. Zur Zukunft der Bibliotheken im Bildungssystem, in: Christian Enichlmayr (Hg.): Bibliotheken – Fundament der Bildung, Tagungsband 28. öst. Bibliothekartag, Linz & Weitra 2005: Oö. Landesbibliothek & Bibliothek der Provinz, ISBN 3-85252-684-1 (title: "Knowledge tanks, search engines and places of learning: on the future of libraries in the educational system")
- Lagebericht: Bildung und Beschäftigung in der oö. Tourismus- und Freizeitwirtschaft (with others), WKOÖ Sektion Tourismus & Freizeit, Linz 2007 (title: "Report on vocational training and work situation in the Upper Austrian tourism and leisure sector")
- The shoe-lace breaching experiment, in: Figurations. Newsletter of the Norbert Elias Foundation, no. 27 (June 2007), pp. 4–6 (ISSN 2166-6644)
- Contingency (religious studies), in: Hans Dieter Betz, Don S. Browing, Bernd Janowski, Eberhard Juengel (eds.): Religion past and present. Encyclopedia of theology and religion, Boston Mass. & Leiden 2008: Brill, vol. 3, ISBN 9789004139794 (Chu-Deu), p. 211
- Der Dritte Mediensektor in Oberösterreich. Eine Reichweiten- und Potenzialanalyse Freier Radios & TV-Sender (with Gusenbauer, Michaela; Tremetzberger, Otto; Vojvoda, Alexander), Linz 2011: edition Radio FRO, ISBN 978-3-200-02445-8 (title: "The third sector of media in Upper Austria. An analysis of reach and potential of free radios and TV stations")
- Knotenpunkte für Wissen, Kommunikation und Identität, in: OPAC - Fachzeitschrift für BibliothekarInnen, Vol. 5, Nummer 3 (2015), pp. 26–27 (ISSN 1864-2950) (title: "Libraries: Central hubs for knowledge, communication and identity")
- Donaustrand und Heiliges Land. Ein Reiseprogramm 1904', in: »Im Land des Herrn«. Franziskanische Zeitschrift für das Heilige Land (hg.: Kommissariate des Heiligen Landes im deutschen Sprachraum, München), 77. Jahrgang 2023, Nr. 1, pp. 14–19 (title: "From the shore of the Danube to the Holy Land. An organized travel program in 1904", published in: The Land of the Lord. Franciscan journal for the Holy Land, Munic).
- Bibliographie/ Media- und Webographie Dr. Max Reisch, zusammengestellt und kommentiert von ... Ingo Mörth, online publication (title: "A Biblio-, Media- and Webography of works by Max Reisch, compiled and commented by Ingo Mörth".
- Pilgerreisen ins Heilige Land als Grundlagen des Tourismus seit dem 15. Jahrhundert, online publication (title: "Pilgrimages to the Holy Land as foundations of tourism since the 15th century") in: Museen in OÖ.| Stiftsmuseum Garsten| Pilgerziel Jerusalem. Erinnerungen und Landkarten vom Mittelalter bis heute (in: "Upper Austrian Museums| Museum of the former Abbey Garsten| Jerusalem pilgrimages - memories and maps from the Middle Ages til today",
