= Yngvi =

Germanic deity

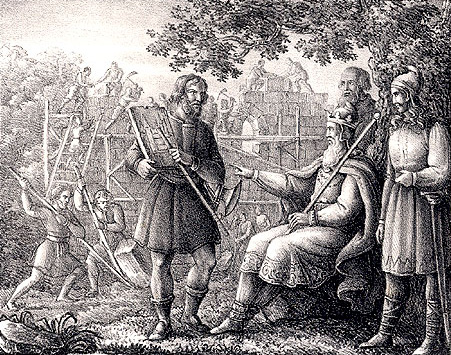
"Yngvi-Freyr builds the Uppsala temple" (1830) by Hugo Hamilton.

Old Norse Yngvi [ˈyŋɡwɪ], Old High German Ing/Ingwi and Old English Ing are names that relate to a theonym which appears to have been the older name for the god Freyr. Proto-Germanic Ingwaz was the legendary ancestor of the Ingaevones, or more accurately Ingvaeones, and is also the reconstructed name of the Elder Futhark rune ᛜ and Anglo-Saxon rune ᛝ, representing /ŋ/.

== Etymology ==
Old Norse Yngvi as well as Old High German Inguin and Old English Ingƿine are all derived from the Proto-Germanic *Ingwaz. Sound changes in late-Proto-Germanic transformed *Ingwaz into *Ingwi(z) in the nominative case and *Ingwin in the accusative case. His epithet *Fraujaz appears in Old Norse compounds Ingvifreyr and Ingunarfreyr. In Beowulf we see Hrothgar called (OE) fréa inguina, which means 'Lord of the Inguins', i.e. lord of the Ingvaeones, the 'friends of Ing'. This strongly indicates that the two deities, Ing and Freyr are indeed the same. However, it is also possible that Ing and Freyr were separate people because they had different fathers. Ing's father was Mannus. Freyr's father was Njörðr. The Ingvaeones, who occupied a territory roughly equivalent to modern Denmark, Frisia, Northern Germany, and the Low Countries at the turn of the millennium, were mentioned by Pliny the Elder in his Natural Histories as one of "five Germanic tribes". Tacitus asserts their descent from the three sons of Mannus or *Mannaz cognate with Manus in Hinduism, the 'first man', of whom *Ingwaz may have been one. Other names that retain the theonym are Inguiomerus or Ingemar and Yngling, the name of an old Scandinavian dynasty.

== The Ingwaz rune ==
Name	Proto-Germanic	Old English
Name	*Ingwaz	Ing
Shape	Elder Futhark	Futhorc
Unicode	ᛜ U+16DC / ᛝ U+16DD	
Transliteration	ŋ	
Transcription	ŋ	
IPA	[ŋ]	
Position in rune-row	22	

The ŋ rune (with variants and) together with Peorð and Eihwaz is among the problematic cases of runes of uncertain derivation unattested in early inscriptions. The rune may have been an original innovation, or it may have been adapted from the classical Latin alphabet's Q. The rune first appears independently on the futhark row of the Kylver Stone, and is altogether unattested as an independent rune outside of such rows. There are a number of attestations of the i͡ŋ bind rune or (the "lantern rune", similar in shape to the Anglo-Saxon gēr rune ᛄ), but its identification is disputed in most cases, since the same sign may also be a cipher rune of wynn or thurisaz. The earliest case of such an i͡ŋ bindrune of reasonably certain reading is the inscription mari͡ŋs (perhaps referring to the "Mærings" or Ostrogoths) on the silver buckle of Szabadbattyán, dated to the first half 5th century and conserved at the Hungarian National Museum in Budapest.

The Old English rune poem contains these obscure lines:

ᛝ Ing ƿæs ærest mid Eástdenum
geseƿen secgum, oð he síððan e[á]st
ofer ƿæg geƿát. ƿæn æfter ran.
þus Heardingas þone hæle nemdon.

"ᛝ Ing was first amidst the East Danes
seen by men, until he eastward
over the sea departed; his wagon ran after.
Thus the Heardings named that hero."

A torc, the so-called "Ring of Pietroassa", part of a late third to fourth century Gothic hoard discovered in Romania, is inscribed in much-damaged runes, one reading of which is gutanī [i(ng)]wi[n] hailag "to Ingwi[n] of the Goths holy".

== Norse mythology ==
In Norse mythology, Yngvi, alternatively spelled Yngve, was the progenitor of the Yngling lineage, a legendary dynasty of Swedish kings, from whom also the earliest historical Norwegian kings claimed to be descended. Yngvi is a name of the god Freyr, perhaps Freyr's true name, as freyr means 'lord' and has probably evolved from a common invocation of the god.

In the Íslendingabók (written in the early twelfth century by the Icelandic priest Ari Þorgilsson) Yngvi konungr 'Yngvi king appears as the father of Njörðr who in turn is the father of Yngvi-Freyr, ancestor of the Ynglings. According to the Skjöldunga saga (a lost epic from 1180 to 1200, saved only partially in other sagas and later translation) Odin came from Asia and conquered Northern Europe. He gave Sweden to his son Yngvi and Denmark to his son Skjöldr. Since then the kings of Sweden were called Ynglings and those of Denmark Skjöldungs.

In the Gesta Danorum (late twelfth century, by Saxo Grammaticus) and in the Ynglinga saga (ca. 1225, by Snorri Sturluson), Freyr is euhemerized as a king of Sweden. In the Ynglinga saga, Yngvi-Freyr reigned in succession to his father Njörðr who had – in this variant – succeeded Odin. In the Historia Norwegiæ (written around 1211), in contrast, Ingui is the first king of Sweden, and the father of a certain Neorth, in his turn the father of Froyr: "Rex itaque Ingui, quem primum Swethiæ monarchiam rexisse plurimi astruunt, genuit Neorth, qui vero genuit Froy; hos ambos tota illorum posteritas per longa sæcula ut deos venerati sunt. Froyr vero genuit Fiolni, qui in dolio medonis dimersus est […]"

In the introduction to his Edda (originally composed around 1220) Snorri Sturluson claimed again that Odin reigned in Sweden and relates: "Odin had with him one of his sons called Yngvi, who was king in Sweden after him; and those houses come from him that are named Ynglings." Snorri here does not identify Yngvi and Freyr, although Freyr occasionally appears elsewhere as a son of Odin instead of a son of Njörðr.

In the Skáldskaparmál section of his Prose Edda Snorri brings in the ancient king Halfdan the Old who is the father of nine sons whose names are all words meaning "king" or "lord" in Old Norse, as well as of nine other sons who are the forefathers of various royal lineages, including "Yngvi, from whom the Ynglings are descended". But rather oddly Snorri immediately follows this with information on what should be four other personages who were not sons of Halfdan but who also fathered dynasties, and names the first of these again as "Yngvi, from whom the Ynglings are descended". In the related account in the Ættartolur "Genealogies" attached to Hversu Noregr byggðist, the name Skelfir appears instead of Yngvi in the list of Halfdan's sons.

The Ynglinga Saga section of Snorri's Heimskringla (around 1230) introduces a second Yngvi, son of Alrekr, who is a descendant of Yngvi-Freyr and who shared the Swedish kingship with his brother Álf (see Yngvi and Alf).

== Given names and family names ==
The element Ing(o)- was widely used in Germanic names from an early period; it is not clear whether it originally referred to the Ingaevones, or to the god Yngwi directly. Inguiomer (Inguiomarus) was a relative of the Cheruscian Arminius in the first century. Ingundis was a wife of the Frankish king Chlothar I, whose son Charibert I married an Ingoberga (all in the sixth century). Other combinations such as masculine Inguin, Ingulf, Ingobald, feminine Inghildis, Ingedrudis, Ingoflidis, as well as the short forms Ingo (masculine) and Inga (feminine) are recorded in the early medieval period (seventh to ninth centuries). In Scandinavia and Germany, and areas where these groups settled, names beginning with Ing survived into modern usage, e.g. Ingmar, Ingvar, Ingvild, Ingeborg, Ingrid, Ingegerd and the family name Ingalls. In most Slavic nations there also exists a name of Igor, of Scandinavian origin, supposedly having the same origin as many similar Scandinavian names, possibly coming from the name Ingvar.

== See also ==
- Manus in Vedic history
- Ingunar-Freyr
- Yngve (a given name)

Yngvi House of Yngling
Preceded by Njörðr	Mythological king of Sweden	Succeeded by Fjölnir
