= List of names of Freyr =

List of names

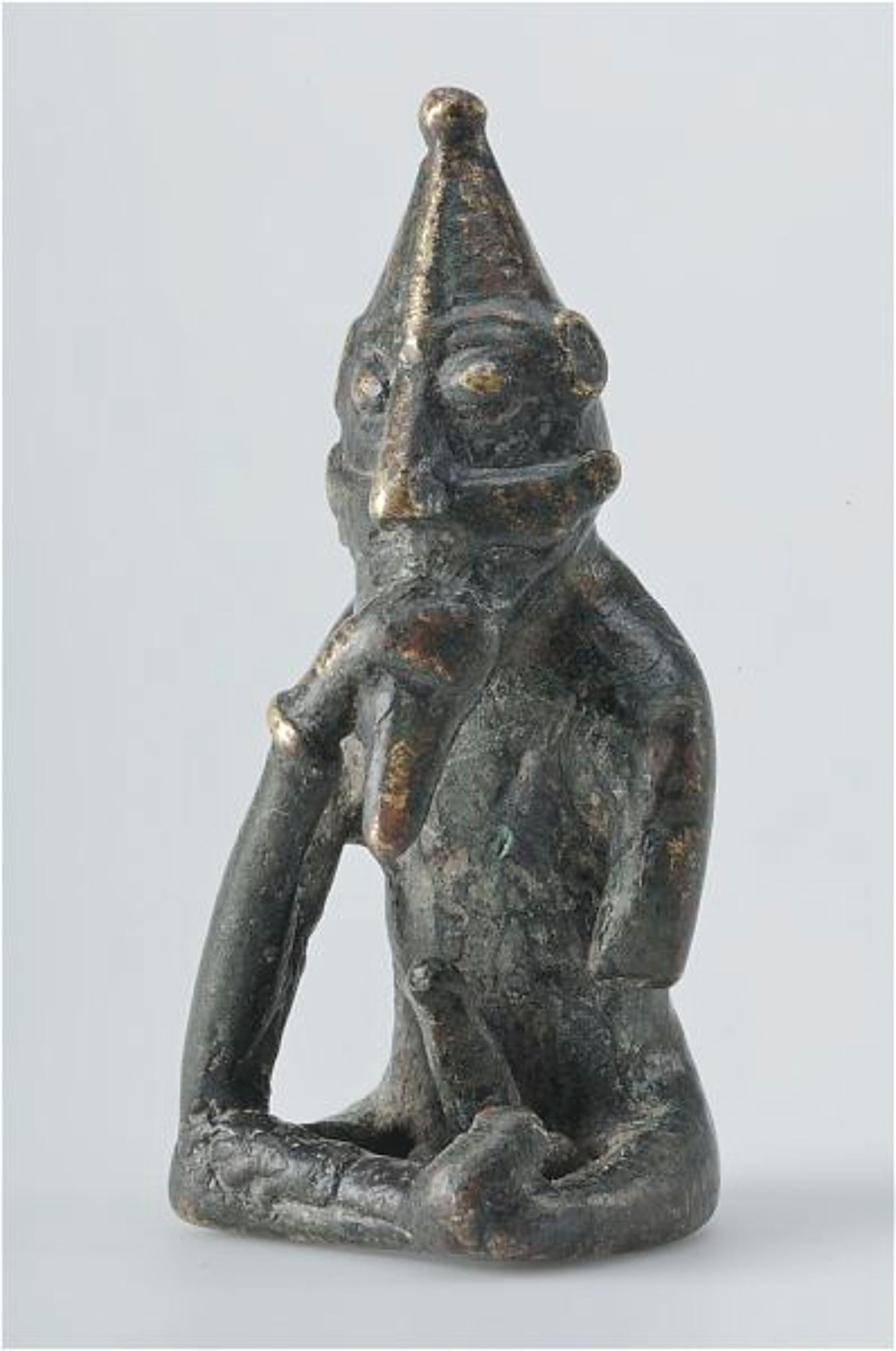
The Rällinge statuette, believed to depict Freyr, Viking Age.

The Germanic god Freyr is referred to by many names in Old Norse poetry and literature. Multiple of these are attested only once in the extant record and are found principally in Skáldskaparmál. Some names have been further proposed by scholars to have referred to the god in the Medieval period, including one from Old English literature.

== Names ==
Name (Old Norse)	Name (Anglicised)	Name meaning	Attestations	Notes
Árguð	Argud	God of the Fertile Season	Skáldskaparmál (14)	
Ballriði	Ballridi	Bold rider	Lokasenna 37	
Bani Belja	Bani Belja	Beli's bane	Vǫluspá 53, Gylfaginning (61), Skáldskaparmál (262)	
Belja dólgr	Belja dolg	Adversary of Beli	Skáldskaparmál (14)	
Blótgoð svía	Blotgod svia	Sacrificial god of the Svear	Ögmundar þáttr dytts	
Fégjafa	Fegjafa	God of Wealth-Gifts	Skáldskaparmál (14)	Also attested as a heiti for Njörðr in Skáldskaparmál (13)
Folkvaldi goða	Folkvaldi goda	Foremost of the gods, Great general of the gods	Skírnismál (3)	
Ingunar-Freyr	Ingunar-Freyr	Ingunar-Freyr	Lokasenna (43), Separate Saga of St. Olaf (Prologue)	
Ǫflugr Atriði	Oflug Atridi	The mighty attacking rider	Skáldskaparmál (261)	Compare with Atriðr, a name for Odin
Son Njarðar	Son Njardar	Son of Njördr	Skáldskaparmál (14), Skírnismál (38, 39)	
Svía goð	Svia god	God of the Svear	Viðbœtir við Olafs sögu hins helga (Chapter 11)	
Vanaguð	Vanagud	God of Vanir	Skáldskaparmál (14)	Also attested as a heiti for Njörðr in Skáldskaparmál (13)
Vananið	Vananid	Kinsman of the Vanir	Skáldskaparmál (14)	Also attested as a heiti for Njörðr in Skáldskaparmál (13)
Vanr	Van	Wane	Skáldskaparmál (14)	Also attested as a heiti for Njörðr in Skáldskaparmál (13)
Vaningi	Vaningi	Member of the Vanir	Skírnismál (37)	Also attested as a heiti for boar in Nafnaþulur (97)
Veralldar gud, Veraldargoð	Veralldar gud, Veraldargod	God of the world, God of this world	Óláfs saga Tryggvasonar en mesta (Flateyjarbók I Chapter 323),Ynglinga Saga (Chapter 13)	Compare with the Sámi god Vearalden Olmai (Man of the World)
Yngvi	Yngvi	Yngve	Ynglinga Saga (Chapter 12)	
Yngvifreyr, Ingifreyr	Yngvifrey	Yngve Frey	Haustlöng (10), Nafnaþulur (22), Sturlaugs saga starfsama (Chapter 19), Ynglinga Saga (Chapter 14)	

== Proposed names ==
Scholars have proposed names that may have been used historically to refer to Freyr. In contrast to the first table, these names rely to varying extents on speculation and are not unequivocal.

Name (Old Norse or Old English)	Name (Anglicised)	Name meaning	Attestations	Notes
Álfr	Alf	Elf	Skáldskaparmál (69), Vafþrúðnismál (46,47) as a component of the sun kenning álfröðull	Proposed by Alaric Hall due to Snorri's description of Freyr ruling over the sun's shining, the name of his servant Skírnir is derived from skírr ('bright'), and the partial synonymity between álfr and vanr.
Alfwalda	Alfwalda	Ruler of elves	Beowulf (Line 1313)	Argued by Paul Beekman Taylor to refer to Freyr, based on the association between Freyr and elves seen in the Dvergatal, in which both Yngvi and Álfr are listed, and in Grímnismál, when he is described as ruling over Álfheimr. Alaric Hall describes the reading of alfwalda, rather than amending to alwalda (all-ruler), as reasonable but notes the argument is highly speculative.
Fróði	Frodi, Frode	Wise	Ynglinga saga (Chapter 12)	In the euhemeristic Ynglinga saga, Fróði's Peace began under the rule of the Freyr, and was maintained after his death through offering him blót and veneration. Referring to the figure after which the period of peace is named, Rudolf Simek states that "it has been realized for a long time that Fróði and Freyr are identical." In Skírnismál (1), Freyr is also referred to as Old Norse: inn fróði (the wise one).
Þrór	Thror	Related to Old Norse: Þróaz ("to grow, to increase"). Has been proposed to mean "The sexually prolific" and "The thriving".	Grímnismál (49), Ynglingatal (51)	A name for Óðinn, proposed by John McKinnell to have been a name for Freyr due to the description of the Norwegian branch of the Ynglings as 'Þrór's descent' (Old Norse: niðkvísl Þrós) and its use as a heiti for boar in Nafnaþulur (97). Olof Sundqvist supports this idea, noting also that Freyr is described as Þroskr in Skírnismál.

== See also ==
- List of names of Odin
- List of names of Thor
- Names of God in Old English poetry

== Bibliography ==
=== Primary ===
- "Beowulf on Steorarume [Beowulf in Cyberspace]: Bilingual Edition (OE text & translation)". heorot.dk.
- "Grímnismál (Old Norse)". heimskringla.no.
- "Gylfaginning (Old Norse)". Heimskringla.
- "Lokasenna (Old Norse)". Heimskringla.
- "Ögmundar þáttr dytts – heimskringla.no". heimskringla.no.
- "Ólafs saga Tryggvasonar (Old Norse)". Heimskringla.
- "Skáldskaparmál (Old Norse)". Heimskringla.≈
- "Skírnismál (Old Norse)". Heimskringla.
- "Ynglingatal – heimskringla.no". heimskringla.no.
- "Ynglinga Saga (Old Norse)". Heimskringla.
- "Viðbœtir við Olafs sögu hins helga – heimskringla.no". heimskringla.no.
- "Sturlaugs saga starfsama, chapter 19". Perseus Digital Library.
- Bellows, Henry Adam (2004). The Poetic Edda : The Mythological Poems. Mineola, NY: Dover Publications. ISBN 0486437108.
- Brodeur, Arthur Gilchrist (1916). The Prose Edda of Snorri Sturluson. New York, The American-Scandinavian Foundation. OCLC 752661114.
- Laing, Samuel; Sturluson, Snorri; Foote, Peter Godfrey (1961). Heimskringla. Part two, Sagas of the Norse Kings. London: Dent. OCLC 959899910.
- Orchard, Andy (2011). The Elder Edda : a book of Viking lore. London: Penguin Books. p. 60. ISBN 9780141393728.
- Wills, Tarrin (2 September 2020). "Skaldic Project - Atriða". Skaldic Poetry of the Scandinavian Middle Ages.
- Young, Jean (1992). The prose Edda of Snorri Sturluson : tales from Norse mythology. Berkeley, Calif.: University of California Press. p. 89. ISBN 9780520273054.

=== Secondary ===
- Gunnell, Terry (2017). Blótgyðjur, Goðar, Mimi, incest, and wagons oral Memories of the religion(s) of the Vanir. The Milman Parry Collection of Oral Literature, Harvard University. p. 123. ISBN 9780674975699.
- Hall, Alaric (2007). Elves in Anglo-Saxon England : matters of belief, health, gender and identity. Woodbridge, Suffolk, UK: Boydell Press. ISBN 978-1843835097.
- Lindow, John (2001). Norse Mythology: A Guide to the Gods, Heroes, Rituals, and Beliefs. Oxford University Press. ISBN 0-19-515382-0.
- Kruken, Kristoffer (1995). Norsk personnamnleksikon (2. utg. / ved Kristoffer Kruken ed.). Oslo: Norske samlaget. ISBN 8252144837.
- Mallet, Paul Henri (2018). Northern Antiquities. Franklin Classics. ISBN 9780343421724.
- McKinnell, John (2005). Meeting the other in Norse myth and legend. Woodbridge, Suffolk, UK: D.S. Brewer. ISBN 1843840421.
- Simek, Rudolf (2008). A Dictionary of Northern Mythology. Translated by Hall, Angela. BOYE6. ISBN 9780859915137.
- Sundqvist, Olof (2002). Freyr's offspring : rulers and religion in ancient Svea society. Uppsala, Sweden: Uppsala universitet. ISBN 9155452639.
- Sundqvist, Olof (2013). "On Freyr - the 'Lord' or 'the fertile one'?: Some Comments on the Discussion of Etymology from the Historian of Religions' Point of View". Onoma. 48: 11–35. doi:10.2143/ONO.48.0.3223612.
- Taylor, Paul Beekman (1998). Sharing story : Medieval Norse-English literary relationships. New York: AMS Press. ISBN 0404641652.
