= 2011 Montana State Bobcats football team =

American college football season

2011 Montana State Bobcats football
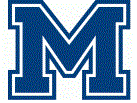

Big Sky champion

NCAA Division I Quarterfinal, L 13–49 vs. Sam Houston State
- Conference: Big Sky Conference

Ranking
- Sports Network: No. 7
- FCS Coaches: No. 7
- Record: 10–3 (7–1 Big Sky)
- Head coach: Rob Ash (5th season)
- Offensive coordinator: Brian Wright (2nd season)
- Defensive coordinator: Jamie Marshall (5th season)
- Home stadium: Bobcat Stadium

2011 Big Sky Conference football standings
	Conf.			Overall
Team	W		L	W		L
No. 7 Montana State $^	7	–	1	10	–	3
No. ~~5~~ Montana† ^	5	–	1	6	–	2
Portland State	5	–	3	7	–	4
Eastern Washington	5	–	3	6	–	5
Weber State	5	–	3	5	–	6
Northern Arizona	3	–	5	4	–	7
Sacramento State	3	–	5	4	–	7
Idaho State*	1	–	7	2	–	9
Northern Colorado	0	–	8	0	–	11
$ – Conference champion; ^ – FCS playoff participant; † Montana vacated two conference wins, five total wins, their conference co-championship, and playoff participation (three games, including two of the five total wins) in 2011 * Idaho State ineligible for FCS playoffs due to APR violations; Rankings from The Sports Network poll, using Montana's later-diminished W–L record

The 2011 Montana State Bobcats football team represented Montana State University as a member of the Big Sky Conference during the 2011 NCAA Division I FCS football season. Led by fifth-year head coach Rob Ash, the Bobcats compiled an overall record of 10–3 with a mark of 7–1 in conference place play, sharing the Big Sky title with Montana. Montana vacated its share of the title on July 26, 2013, after the NCAA determined that Montana had played its final six games with ineligible players. Montana State received an at-large bid to the NCAA Division I Football Championship playoffs, where they defeated New Hampshire in the second round before falling to Sam Houston State in the quarterfinals. The Bobcats played their home games at Bobcat Stadium in Bozeman, Montana/

== Schedule ==
Date	Time	Opponent	Rank	Site	TV	Result	Attendance
September 1	6:00 pm	at Utah*	No. 6	Rice-Eccles Stadium; Salt Lake City, UT	KJZZ/ Max Media	L 10–27	45,311
September 10	1:00 pm	UC Davis*	No. 6	Bobcat Stadium; Bozeman, MT	Max Media	W 38–14	18,487
September 17	1:30 pm	Minot State*	No. 5	Bobcat Stadium; Bozeman, MT	Max Media	W 43–7	16,507
September 24	4:00 pm	at No. 21 Eastern Washington	No. 4	Roos Field; Cheney, WA	Max Media/SWX	W 36–21	10,422
October 1	1:30 pm	No. 25 Sacramento State	No. 4	Bobcat Stadium; Bozeman, MT	Max Media	W 31–21	18,847
October 8	1:00 pm	at Portland State	No. 3	Jeld-Wen Field; Portland, OR	Max Media	W 38–36	9,054
October 15	1:00 pm	Northern Arizona	No. 3	Bobcat Stadium; Bozeman, MT	Max Media	W 41–24	17,527
October 22	1:30 pm	at Northern Colorado	No. 3	Nottingham Field; Greeley, CO	ALT/CSNNW/CSNCA	W 31–21	5,301
October 29	12:00 pm	Idaho State	No. 4	Bobcat Stadium; Bozeman, MT	Max Media	W 54–13	16,517
November 5	1:30 pm	at Weber State	No. 2	Stewart Stadium; Ogden, UT	ALT/CSNNW/CSNCA	W 44–24	6,505
November 19	12:00 pm	No. 7 Montana	No. 1	Bobcat Stadium; Bozeman, MT (rivalry)	KPAX	L 10–36	20,247
December 3	1:00 pm	No. 11 New Hampshire*	No. 7	Bobcat Stadium; Bozeman, MT (NCAA Division I Second Round)	ESPN3	W 26–25	11,367
December 10	10:00 am	at No. 1 Sam Houston State*	No. 7	Bowers Stadium; Huntsville, TX (NCAA Division I Quarterfinal)	ESPN	L 13–49	9,077
*Non-conference game; Rankings from The Sports Network Poll released prior to the game; All times are in Mountain time
