= 2011 Northern Colorado Bears football team =

American college football season

2011 Northern Colorado Bears football
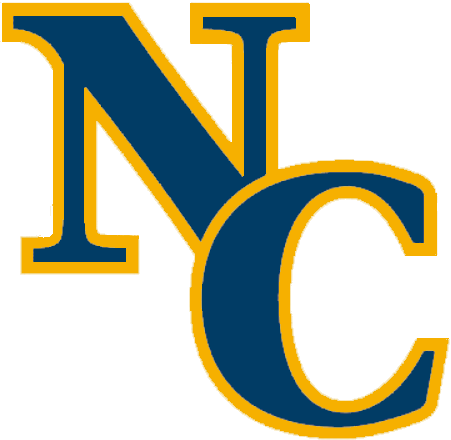
- Conference: Big Sky Conference
- Record: 0–11 (0–8 Big Sky)
- Head coach: Earnest Collins Jr. (1st season)
- Offensive coordinator: Michael Armour
- Defensive coordinator: Zach Shay
- Home stadium: Nottingham Field

2011 Big Sky Conference football standings
	Conf.			Overall
Team	W		L	W		L
No. 7 Montana State $^	7	–	1	10	–	3
No. ~~5~~ Montana† ^	5	–	1	6	–	2
Portland State	5	–	3	7	–	4
Eastern Washington	5	–	3	6	–	5
Weber State	5	–	3	5	–	6
Northern Arizona	3	–	5	4	–	7
Sacramento State	3	–	5	4	–	7
Idaho State*	1	–	7	2	–	9
Northern Colorado	0	–	8	0	–	11
$ – Conference champion; ^ – FCS playoff participant; † Montana vacated two conference wins, five total wins, their conference co-championship, and playoff participation (three games, including two of the five total wins) in 2011 * Idaho State ineligible for FCS playoffs due to APR violations; Rankings from The Sports Network poll, using Montana's later-diminished W–L record

The 2011 Northern Colorado Bears football team represented the University of Northern Colorado in the 2011 NCAA Division I FCS football season. The Bears were led by first-year head coach Earnest Collins Jr. and played their home games at Nottingham Field. They are a member of the Big Sky Conference. They finished the season 0–11, 0–8 in Big Sky place to finish in last place. It was the school's first winless season since 1920.

== Schedule ==
Date	Time	Opponent	Site	TV	Result	Attendance
September 3	1:30 pm	Lindenwood*	Nottingham Field; Greeley, CO		L 20–22	4,393
September 10	12:00 pm	at Colorado State*	Hughes Stadium; Fort Collins, CO	The Mtn.	L 14–33	25,367
September 17	4:00 pm	at Idaho State	Holt Arena; Pocatello, ID		L 20–50	6,350
September 24	1:30 pm	Weber State^{†}	Nottingham Field; Greeley, CO	ALT/CSNNW/CSNCA	L 21–45	5,692
October 1	1:00 pm	at No. 19 Montana	Washington–Grizzly Stadium; Missoula, MT	KPAX	L 28–55	25,919
October 8	1:30 pm	Sacramento State	Nottingham Field; Greeley, CO		L 0–14	1,189
October 15	5:00 pm	at Eastern Washington	Roos Field; Cheney, WA	SWX Right Now	L 27–48	8,742
October 22	1:30 pm	No. 3 Montana State	Nottingham Field; Greeley, CO	ALT/CSNNW/CSNCA	L 21–31	5,301
October 29	1:30 pm	North Dakota*	Nottingham Field; Greeley, CO	Big Sky TV	L 25–27	3,171
November 5	4:00 pm	at Northern Arizona	Walkup Skydome; Flagstaff, AZ	NAU-TV/FCSP	L 14–34	3,417
November 12	12:00 pm	Portland State	Nottingham Field; Greeley, CO		L 17–23	3,682
*Non-conference game; ^{†}Homecoming; Rankings from The Sports Network Poll released prior to the game; All times are in Mountain time
