= 2010 Eastern Washington Eagles football team =

American college football season

2010 Eastern Washington Eagles football

NCAA Division I champion Big Sky co-champion

NCAA Division I Championship Game, W 20–19 vs. Delaware
- Conference: Big Sky Conference

Ranking
- Sports Network: No. 1
- FCS Coaches: No. 1
- Record: 13–2 (7–1 Big Sky)
- Head coach: Beau Baldwin (3rd season)
- Offensive coordinator: Aaron Best (3rd season)
- Offensive scheme: Spread
- Defensive coordinator: John Graham (3rd season)
- Base defense: 3–4
- Home stadium: Roos Field

2010 Big Sky Conference football standings
	Conf.			Overall
Team	W		L	W		L
No. 1 Eastern Washington +^	7	–	1	13	–	2
No. 11 Montana State +^	7	–	1	9	–	3
No. 20 Montana	5	–	3	7	–	4
Weber State	5	–	3	6	–	5
Sacramento State	5	–	3	6	–	5
Northern Arizona	4	–	4	6	–	5
Northern Colorado	2	–	6	3	–	8
Portland State	1	–	7	2	–	9
Idaho State	0	–	8	1	–	10
$ – Conference champion; ^ – FCS playoff participant; Rankings from The Sports Network poll

The 2010 Eastern Washington Eagles football team represented Eastern Washington University in the 2010 NCAA Division I FCS football season. The team was coached by Beau Baldwin and played their home games at Roos Field in Cheney, Washington.

The football team competed as a member of the Big Sky Conference. The Eagles won the NCAA Division I FCS National Championship and claimed a share of the Big Sky Conference championship with Montana State.

== Schedule ==
Date	Time	Opponent	Rank	Site	TV	Result	Attendance	Source
September 2	6:05 p.m.	at Nevada*	No. 13	Mackay Stadium; Reno, NV		L 24–49	16,313	
September 11	6:05 p.m.	vs. No. 5 (Div. II) Central Washington*	No. 17	Qwest Field; Seattle, WA		W 35–32	6,142	
September 18	4:05 p.m.	No. 6 Montana	No. 18	Roos Field; Cheney, WA (EWU–UM Governors Cup)	SWX	W 36–27	11,702	
September 25	1:07 p.m.	at No. 17 Montana State	No. 9	Bobcat Stadium; Bozeman, MT		L 7–30	14,207	
October 2	1:30 p.m.	at Weber State	No. 16	Stewart Stadium; Ogden UT	ALT	W 35–24	5,462	
October 9	1:05 p.m.	Northern Arizona	No. 13	Roos Field; Cheney, WA	SWX	W 21–14	7,472	
October 16	1:30 p.m.	at Northern Colorado	No. 12	Nottingham Field; Greeley, CO	CSNNW	W 35–28	4,864	
October 23	1:05 p.m.	Sacramento State^{†}	No. 8	Roos Field; Cheney, WA		W 28–24	7,147	
October 30	5:05 p.m.	at Portland State	No. 8	Hillsboro Stadium; Hillsboro, OR (The Dam Cup)		W 50–17	4,097	
November 13	1:05 p.m.	Southern Utah*	No. 5	Roos Field; Cheney, WA	SWX	W 31–24	5,357	
November 20	1:05 p.m.	Idaho State	No. 3	Roos Field; Cheney, WA	SWX	W 34–7	5,781	
December 4	1:05 p.m.	No. 9 Southeast Missouri State*	No. 1	Roos Field; Cheney, WA (NCAA Division I Second Round)		W 37–17	3,665	
December 11	12:35 p.m.	No. 25 North Dakota State*	No. 1	Roos Field; Cheney, WA (NCAA Division I Quarterfinal)	ESPN3	W 38–31 ^{OT}	4,060	
December 17	5:05 p.m.	No. 10 Villanova*	No. 1	Roos Field; Cheney, WA (NCAA Division I Semifinal)	ESPN2	W 41–31	6,600	
January 7, 2011	4:00 p.m.	vs. No. 5 Delaware*	No. 1	Pizza Hut Park; Frisco, TX (NCAA Division I Championship Game)	ESPN2	W 20–19	13,027	
*Non-conference game; ^{†}Homecoming; Rankings from The Sports Network Poll released prior to the game; All times are in Pacific time

== Rankings ==
Ranking movements Legend: ██ Increase in ranking ██ Decrease in ranking ( ) = First-place votes
	Week													
Poll	Pre	1	2	3	4	5	6	7	8	9	10	11	12	Final
The Sports Network	13	17	18	9	16	13	12	8	8	6	5 (4)	3 (8)	1 (64)	1 (121)
Coaches	14	15	16	10	17	14	12	8	8	6	5	3 (1)	1 (13)	1

== Game summaries ==
=== At Nevada ===
	1	2	3	4	Total
No. 13 Eagles	7	3	14	0	24
Wolf Pack	21	7	7	14	49

Statistics	EWU	NEV
First downs	20	24
Total yards	432	553
Rushing yards	162	214
Passing yards	280	339
Passing: comp–att–int	21–40–1	27–38–0
Turnovers	2	1

Team	Category	Player	Statistics
Eastern Washington	Passing	Bo Levi Mitchell	19/35, 253 yards, 2 TD
Eastern Washington	Rushing	Taiwan Jones	12 rushes, 145 yards
Eastern Washington	Receiving	Taiwan Jones	2 receptions, 98 yards, TD
Nevada	Passing	Colin Kaepernick	26/37, 306 yards, 2 TD
Nevada	Rushing	Colin Kaepernick	11 rushes, 60 yards, 2 TD
Nevada	Receiving	Virgil Green	7 receptions, 144 yards, 2 TD

=== Vs. No. 5 (Div. II) Central Washington ===
	1	2	3	4	Total
No. 5 (Div. II) Wildcats	9	7	9	7	32
No. 17 Eagles	7	14	14	0	35

Statistics	CWU	EWU
First downs	27	21
Total yards	357	311
Rushing yards	106	106
Passing yards	251	205
Passing: comp–att–int	29–46–2	19–32–1
Turnovers	3	2

Team	Category	Player	Statistics
Central Washington	Passing	Ryan Robertson	29/46, 251 yards, 2 TD, 2 INT
Central Washington	Rushing	Bryson Kelly	19 rushes, 86 yards, TD
Central Washington	Receiving	Kollin Hancock	6 receptions, 88 yards, TD
Eastern Washington	Passing	Bo Levi Mitchell	16/27, 188 yards, 2 TD, INT
Eastern Washington	Rushing	Taiwan Jones	14 rushes, 89 yards, 2 TD
Eastern Washington	Receiving	Taiwan Jones	4 receptions, 63 yards, TD

=== No. 6 Montana ===
	1	2	3	4	Total
No. 6 Grizzlies	14	7	3	3	27
No. 18 Eagles	7	7	10	12	36

Statistics	MONT	EWU
First downs	19	24
Total yards	390	503
Rushing yards	186	269
Passing yards	214	246
Passing: comp–att–int	19–36–2	17–41–2
Turnovers	6	3

Team	Category	Player	Statistics
Montana	Passing	Andrew Selle	19/34, 204 yards, TD, 2 INT
Montana	Rushing	Chase Reynolds	22 rushes, 114 yards
Montana	Receiving	Jabin Sambrano	5 receptions, 65 yards
Eastern Washington	Passing	Bo Levi Mitchell	17/37, 234 yards, TD, 2 INT
Eastern Washington	Rushing	Taiwan Jones	27 rushes, 221 yards, TD
Eastern Washington	Receiving	Brandon Kaufman	5 receptions, 119 yards, TD

=== At No. 17 Montana State ===
	1	2	3	4	Total
No. 9 Eagles	0	7	0	0	7
No. 17 Bobcats	13	7	3	7	30

Statistics	EWU	MTST
First downs	23	19
Total yards	382	439
Rushing yards	110	156
Passing yards	272	283
Passing: comp–att–int	24–49–1	15–24–1
Turnovers	2	1

Team	Category	Player	Statistics
Eastern Washington	Passing	Bo Levi Mitchell	24/49, 272 yards, TD, INT
Eastern Washington	Rushing	Taiwan Jones	13 rushes, 63 yards
Eastern Washington	Receiving	Brandon Kaufman	6 receptions, 82 yards
Montana State	Passing	DeNarius McGhee	15/24, 283 yards, TD, INT
Montana State	Rushing	Orenzo Davis	17 rushes, 66 yards
Montana State	Receiving	Elvis Akpla	5 receptions, 117 yards

=== At Weber State ===
	1	2	3	4	Total
No. 16 Eagles	7	7	7	14	35
Wildcats	3	0	14	7	24

Statistics	EWU	WEB
First downs	22	24
Total yards	465	459
Rushing yards	128	144
Passing yards	337	323
Passing: comp–att–int	23–36–1	25–44–3
Turnovers	1	3

Team	Category	Player	Statistics
Eastern Washington	Passing	Bo Levi Mitchell	23/36, 337 yards, 4 TD, INT
Eastern Washington	Rushing	Darriell Beaumonte	26 rushes, 78 yards, TD
Eastern Washington	Receiving	Brandon Kaufman	5 receptions, 138 yards
Weber State	Passing	Cameron Higgins	25/44, 315 yards, 3 TD, 3 INT
Weber State	Rushing	Bo Bolen	14 rushes, 54 yards
Weber State	Receiving	Mike Phillips	6 receptions, 165 yards, TD

=== Northern Arizona ===
	1	2	3	4	Total
Lumberjacks	0	0	7	7	14
No. 13 Eagles	7	7	7	0	21

Statistics	NAU	EWU
First downs	24	18
Total yards	317	354
Rushing yards	39	66
Passing yards	289	296
Passing: comp–att–int	30–50–3	20–26–2
Turnovers	3	5

Team	Category	Player	Statistics
Northern Arizona	Passing	Michael Herrick	21/33, 188 yards, 3 INT
Northern Arizona	Rushing	Giovannie Dixon	10 rushes, 40 yards
Northern Arizona	Receiving	Daiveun Curry-Chapman	10 receptions, 75 yards
Eastern Washington	Passing	Bo Levi Mitchell	20/26, 288 yards, 3 TD, 2 INT
Eastern Washington	Rushing	Taiwan Jones	16 rushes, 48 yards
Eastern Washington	Receiving	Brandon Kaufman	5 receptions, 117 yards, TD

=== At Northern Colorado ===
	1	2	3	4	Total
No. 12 Eagles	7	14	0	14	35
Bears	14	0	7	7	28

Statistics	EWU	UNCO
First downs		
Total yards		
Rushing yards		
Passing yards		
Passing: comp–att–int		
Turnovers		

Team	Category	Player	Statistics
Eastern Washington	Passing		
Eastern Washington	Rushing		
Eastern Washington	Receiving		
Northern Colorado	Passing		
Northern Colorado	Rushing		
Northern Colorado	Receiving		

=== Sacramento State ===
	1	2	3	4	Total
Hornets	0	3	0	21	24
No. 8 Eagles	7	14	0	7	28

Statistics	SAC	EWU
First downs		
Total yards		
Rushing yards		
Passing yards		
Passing: comp–att–int		
Turnovers		

Team	Category	Player	Statistics
Sacramento State	Passing		
Sacramento State	Rushing		
Sacramento State	Receiving		
Eastern Washington	Passing		
Eastern Washington	Rushing		
Eastern Washington	Receiving		

=== At Portland State ===
	1	2	3	4	Total
No. 8 Eagles	14	14	16	6	50
Vikings	0	10	0	7	17

Statistics	EWU	PRST
First downs		
Total yards		
Rushing yards		
Passing yards		
Passing: comp–att–int		
Turnovers		

Team	Category	Player	Statistics
Eastern Washington	Passing		
Eastern Washington	Rushing		
Eastern Washington	Receiving		
Portland State	Passing		
Portland State	Rushing		
Portland State	Receiving		

=== Southern Utah ===
	1	2	3	4	Total
Thunderbirds	7	7	10	0	24
No. 5 Eagles	10	7	7	7	31

Statistics	SUU	EWU
First downs		
Total yards		
Rushing yards		
Passing yards		
Passing: comp–att–int		
Turnovers		

Team	Category	Player	Statistics
Southern Utah	Passing		
Southern Utah	Rushing		
Southern Utah	Receiving		
Eastern Washington	Passing		
Eastern Washington	Rushing		
Eastern Washington	Receiving		

=== Idaho State ===
	1	2	3	4	Total
Bengals	0	7	0	0	7
No. 3 Eagles	7	21	3	3	34

Statistics	IDST	EWU
First downs		
Total yards		
Rushing yards		
Passing yards		
Passing: comp–att–int		
Turnovers		

Team	Category	Player	Statistics
Idaho State	Passing		
Idaho State	Rushing		
Idaho State	Receiving		
Eastern Washington	Passing		
Eastern Washington	Rushing		
Eastern Washington	Receiving		

=== No. 9 Southeast Missouri State (Division I Second Round) ===
	1	2	3	4	Total
No. 9 Redhawks	7	10	0	0	17
No. 1 Eagles	7	10	7	13	37

Statistics	SEMO	EWU
First downs		
Total yards		
Rushing yards		
Passing yards		
Passing: comp–att–int		
Turnovers		

Team	Category	Player	Statistics
Southeast Missouri State	Passing		
Southeast Missouri State	Rushing		
Southeast Missouri State	Receiving		
Eastern Washington	Passing		
Eastern Washington	Rushing		
Eastern Washington	Receiving		

=== No. 25 North Dakota State (Division I Quarterfinal) ===
	1	2	3	4	OT	Total
No. 25 Bison	0	10	14	7	0	31
No. 1 Eagles	14	3	7	7	7	38

Statistics	NDSU	EWU
First downs		
Total yards		
Rushing yards		
Passing yards		
Passing: comp–att–int		
Turnovers		

Team	Category	Player	Statistics
North Dakota State	Passing		
North Dakota State	Rushing		
North Dakota State	Receiving		
Eastern Washington	Passing		
Eastern Washington	Rushing		
Eastern Washington	Receiving		

=== No. 10 Villanova (Division I Semifinal) ===
	1	2	3	4	Total
No. 10 Wildcats	7	7	10	7	31
No. 1 Eagles	13	7	7	14	41

Statistics	VILL	EWU
First downs		
Total yards		
Rushing yards		
Passing yards		
Passing: comp–att–int		
Turnovers		

Team	Category	Player	Statistics
Villanova	Passing		
Villanova	Rushing		
Villanova	Receiving		
Eastern Washington	Passing		
Eastern Washington	Rushing		
Eastern Washington	Receiving		

=== Vs. No. 5 Delaware (Division I Championship Game) ===
	1	2	3	4	Total
No. 5 Fightin' Blue Hens	6	6	7	0	19
No. 1 Eagles	0	0	6	14	20

Statistics	DEL	EWU
First downs		
Total yards		
Rushing yards		
Passing yards		
Passing: comp–att–int		
Turnovers		

Team	Category	Player	Statistics
Delaware	Passing		
Delaware	Rushing		
Delaware	Receiving		
Eastern Washington	Passing		
Eastern Washington	Rushing		
Eastern Washington	Receiving		

== Personnel ==
2010 Eastern Washington Eagles football team roster
Players
Coaches
Offense

Pos.	#	Name	Class
WR	1	Brandon Kaufman	So
WR	2	Ashton Gant	Sr
WR	3	Greg Herd	So
QB	8	Nick Gauthier	Jr
WR	8	Alante Wright	Fr
QB	9	Bo Levi Mitchell	Jr
QB	12	Anthony Vitto	Fr
QB	13	Scott Burgett	So
QB	16	Greg Panelli	Jr
WR	17	Alante Wright	Fr
TE	18	Jason Harris	Sr
WR	19	Andre Williams	Fr
RB	22	Taiwan Jones	Jr
RB	25	Mario Brown	Fr
WR	26	Cory Mitchell	Fr
RB	30	Darriell Beaumonte	Jr
RB	31	Derrick Talley	Fr
RB	32	Chase King	So
WR	33	Tyler Hart	Jr
WR	35	Ashton Clark	Fr
RB	37	Daniel Johnson	Fr
OL	52	Drew Reynolds	Fr
OL	58	Clint Moquist	Sr
OL	60	Gabriel Jackson	Jr
OL	61	Jared Hansen	Fr
OL	66	Ashton Miller	Fr
OL	67	Caleb Worthington	Fr
OL	70	Steven Forgette	Fr
OL	72	Nikolai Myers	Sr
OL	74	Russell Turpin	Fr
OL	75	Jase Butorac	Fr
OL	75	Cody Humphrey	Fr
OL	76	Will Post	So
OL	77	Brandon Murphy	Fr
OL	78	Chris Powers	Jr
OL	79	Brice Leahy	Sr
WR	80	Nicholas Edwards	So
TE	82	Matt Martin	Sr
WR	83	Dalton Puyear	So
TE	85	Zack Gehring	Fr
TE	86	Patrick Mealey	So
RB	87	Trenton Pinson	Fr
TE	88	Ryan Seto	Fr
WR	89	Parker Flynn	So
OL	96	Josh Antonson	So
FB, TE	96	Ray Falelaulii	Jr
TE		Mat Lawrence	So

Defense

Pos.	#	Name	Class
LB	4	J. C. Sherritt	Sr
DB	5	Matt Johnson	Jr
DB	6	Chandler Gayton	Fr
DB	7	Jeff Minnerly	So
LB	10	Zach Johnson	Jr
DB	11	John Roberts	Jr
DB	14	Alden Gibbs	Jr
DB	15	Domonic Sheppard	So
DB	20	Billy Lechtenberg	So
DB	21	Jesse Hoffman	Sr
DB	23	Ethen Robinson	Sr
DB	24	Ronald Baines	Fr
DB	26	Fialele Coffin	Fr
LB	27	Devin Topps	Fr
DB	28	Dante Calcote	Sr
DB	29	Jeremy Chaten	Jr
DB	31	T.J. Lee	Fr
DB	34	Artise Gauldin	So
DB	36	Will Edge	Sr
DB	37	Erich Armstrong	So
DB	38	Allen Brown	Fr
LB	39	Ronnie Hamlin	Fr
DB	40	Bo Schuetzle	Fr
LB	41	J.C. Agen	Fr
DB	42	Markeem Adams	Fr
DB	42	Derek Robinson	So
LB	43	Rusty Haehl	So
LB	44	Paul Ena	So
LB	46	Jakob Pugsley	Fr
LB	47	Bobby Gentry	Jr
LB	48	Grant Williams	So
DL	49	Tyler Jolley	Sr
LB	51	Tyler Washburn	So
DL	52	Nick Stewart	So
DL	56	Evan Cook	So
DL	57	Dylan Zylstra	Fr
LB	59	Spencer Hessler	Fr
DL	63	Levi Reynolds	Sr
DL	64	Evan Day	Fr
DL	65	Will Katoa	Fr
DL	69	Ashton Boothroyd	Fr
LB	81	John Goldwire	Fr
DL	90	David Gaylord	Fr
DL	91	Jerry Ceja	So
DL	93	John Asplund	Fr
DL	94	Jakob Scott	Fr
DL	95	Charles Moetului	Jr
DL	97	David Miles	Jr
DL	98	Renard Williams	Jr
DL	99	Anthony Larry	Fr
LB		Jamaal Lind	Fr

Special teams

Pos.	#	Name	Class
P	45	Cameron Zuber	Sr
LS	54	Jake Potter	So
LS	55	Kadeem Smalls	Fr
P	62	Cameron Homan	Fr
K	68	Kevin Miller	So
K	92	Mike Jarrett	Jr

Head coach

- Beau Baldwin

Coordinators/assistant coaches

- John Graham – Associate head coach/defensive coordinator/linebackers
- Aaron Best – Offensive coordinator/offensive line/Academic Coordinator
- Chris Hansen – Running Backs/Camps Coordinator
- Jeff Schmedding – Safeties/special teams Coordinator/Video Coordinator
- Torey Hunter – Cornerbacks/Travel Coordinator
- Ryan Sawyer – Defensive Line/recruiting coordinator
- Junior Adams – Wide receivers
- Zak Hill – Quarterbacks

Legend

- (C) Team captain
- (S) Suspended
- (I) Ineligible
- Injured
- Redshirt

Roster

== Awards and honors ==
- Big Sky Conference Co-offensive Player of the Year (coaches and media) — Taiwan Jones
- Big Sky Conference Defensive Player of the Year (coaches and media) — J. C. Sherritt
- Buck Buchanan Award — J. C. Sherritt
