= 2011 Eastern Washington Eagles football team =

American college football season

2011 Eastern Washington Eagles football
- Conference: Big Sky Conference
- Record: 6–5 (5–3 Big Sky)
- Head coach: Beau Baldwin (4th season)
- Offensive coordinator: Aaron Best (4th season)
- Defensive coordinator: John Graham (4th season)
- Home stadium: Roos Field

2011 Big Sky Conference football standings
	Conf.			Overall
Team	W		L	W		L
No. 7 Montana State $^	7	–	1	10	–	3
No. ~~5~~ Montana† ^	5	–	1	6	–	2
Portland State	5	–	3	7	–	4
Eastern Washington	5	–	3	6	–	5
Weber State	5	–	3	5	–	6
Northern Arizona	3	–	5	4	–	7
Sacramento State	3	–	5	4	–	7
Idaho State*	1	–	7	2	–	9
Northern Colorado	0	–	8	0	–	11
$ – Conference champion; ^ – FCS playoff participant; † Montana vacated two conference wins, five total wins, their conference co-championship, and playoff participation (three games, including two of the five total wins) in 2011 * Idaho State ineligible for FCS playoffs due to APR violations; Rankings from The Sports Network poll, using Montana's later-diminished W–L record

The 2011 Eastern Washington Eagles football team represented Eastern Washington University in the 2011 NCAA Division I FCS football season. The team was coached by Beau Baldwin, who was in his fourth season with Eastern Washington. The Eagles played their home games at Roos Field in Cheney, Washington, and are a member of the Big Sky Conference. The Eagles entered the 2011 season as defending national champions.

The Eagles finished the season 6–5, 5–3 in Big Sky play to finish in a tie for third place.

== Schedule ==
Date	Time	Opponent	Rank	Site	TV	Result	Attendance
September 3	4:00 pm	at Washington*	No. 1	Husky Stadium; Seattle, WA	RTNW	L 27–30	58,088
September 10	2:00 pm	at South Dakota*	No. 1	DakotaDome; Vermillion, SD	Midco SN3	L 17–30	8,696
September 17	12:00 pm	at No. 12 Montana	No. 10	Washington–Grizzly Stadium; Missoula, MT (Governors Cup)	SWX, KPAX	L 14–17	26,066
September 24	4:00 pm	No. 4 Montana State	No. 21	Roos Field; Cheney, WA	SWX, Mass Media	L 21–36	10,422
October 1	1:00 pm	Weber State		Roos Field; Cheney, WA	ALT, CSNNW	W 27–21	7,427
October 8	3:00 pm	at Northern Arizona		Walkup Skydome; Flagstaff, AZ	NAU-TV, FCS Pacific	W 36–28	5,012
October 15	4:00 pm	Northern Colorado^{†}		Roos Field; Cheney, WA	SWX	W 48–27	8,742
October 22	6:00 pm	at Sacramento State		Hornet Stadium; Sacramento, CA		W 42–35 ^{OT}	10,705
October 29	1:00 pm	Portland State		Roos Field; Cheney, WA (The Dam Cup)	SWX, CSNNW	L 26–43	9,003
November 12	6:00 pm	at Cal Poly*		Alex G. Spanos Stadium; San Luis Obispo, CA	KSBY	W 53–51 ^{3OT}	6,562
November 19	3:00 pm	at Idaho State		Holt Arena; Pocatello, ID		W 45–14	5,794
*Non-conference game; ^{†}Homecoming; Rankings from The Sports Network Poll released prior to the game; All times are in Pacific time
