= 2011 Northern Arizona Lumberjacks football team =

American college football season

2011 Northern Arizona Lumberjacks football
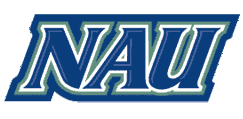
- Conference: Big Sky Conference
- Record: 4–7 (3–5 Big Sky)
- Head coach: Jerome Souers (14th season)
- Offensive coordinator: Brian Lindgren (3rd season)
- Defensive coordinator: Andy Thompson (3rd season)
- Home stadium: Walkup Skydome

2011 Big Sky Conference football standings
	Conf.			Overall
Team	W		L	W		L
No. 7 Montana State $^	7	–	1	10	–	3
No. ~~5~~ Montana† ^	5	–	1	6	–	2
Portland State	5	–	3	7	–	4
Eastern Washington	5	–	3	6	–	5
Weber State	5	–	3	5	–	6
Northern Arizona	3	–	5	4	–	7
Sacramento State	3	–	5	4	–	7
Idaho State*	1	–	7	2	–	9
Northern Colorado	0	–	8	0	–	11
$ – Conference champion; ^ – FCS playoff participant; † Montana vacated two conference wins, five total wins, their conference co-championship, and playoff participation (three games, including two of the five total wins) in 2011 * Idaho State ineligible for FCS playoffs due to APR violations; Rankings from The Sports Network poll, using Montana's later-diminished W–L record

The 2011 Northern Arizona Lumberjacks football team represented Northern Arizona University as a member of the Big Sky Conference during the 2011 NCAA Division I FCS football season . The Lumberjacks were led by 14th-year head coach Jerome Souers and played their home games at the Walkup Skydome. They finished the season with an overall record of 4–7 and a mark of 3–5 in conference play, tying for sixth place in Big Sky.

== Schedule ==
Date	Time	Opponent	Site	TV	Result	Attendance
September 3	7:00 pm	at Arizona*	Arizona Stadium; Tucson, AZ	FSAZ/KWBA/FCSA	L 10–41	51,761
September 10	3:00 pm	Fort Lewis*	Walkup Skydome; Flagstaff, AZ	NAU-TV/FCSA	W 58–13	7,108
September 17	5:00 pm	at Portland State	Jeld-Wen Field; Portland, OR	CSNNW	L 29–31	5,479
September 24	3:00 pm	Idaho State	Walkup Skydome; Flagstaff, AZ	NAU-TV/FCSP	W 20–3	9,304
October 8	3:00 pm	Eastern Washington	Walkup Skydome; Flagstaff, AZ	NAU-TV/FCSA	L 28–36	5,012
October 15	12:00 pm	at No. 3 Montana State	Bobcat Stadium; Bozeman, MT	Max Media	L 24–41	17,527
October 22	3:00 pm	No. 9 Montana^{†}	Walkup Skydome; Flagstaff, AZ	NAU-TV/KPAX	L 24–28	8,421
October 29	1:30 pm	at Sacramento State	Hornet Stadium; Sacramento, CA		W 27–26	6,119
November 5	3:00 pm	Northern Colorado	Walkup Skydome; Flagstaff, AZ	NAU-TV/FCSP	W 34–14	3,417
November 12	1:30 pm	at Weber State	Stewart Stadium; Ogden, UT		L 31–34	7,614
November 19	3:00 pm	Southern Utah*	Walkup Skydome; Flagstaff, AZ (rivalry)	NAU-TV/FCSP	L 24–27	4,398
*Non-conference game; ^{†}Homecoming; Rankings from The Sports Network Poll released prior to the game; All times are in Mountain time
