= 2010 Portland State Vikings football team =

American college football season

2010 Portland State Vikings football
- Conference: Big Sky Conference
- Record: 2–9 (1–7 Big Sky)
- Head coach: Nigel Burton (1st season)
- Offensive coordinator: Bruce Barnum (1st season)
- Offensive scheme: Pistol
- Defensive coordinator: Eric Jackson (1st season)
- Base defense: 4–3
- Home stadium: Hillsboro Stadium

2010 Big Sky Conference football standings
	Conf.			Overall
Team	W		L	W		L
No. 1 Eastern Washington +^	7	–	1	13	–	2
No. 11 Montana State +^	7	–	1	9	–	3
No. 20 Montana	5	–	3	7	–	4
Weber State	5	–	3	6	–	5
Sacramento State	5	–	3	6	–	5
Northern Arizona	4	–	4	6	–	5
Northern Colorado	2	–	6	3	–	8
Portland State	1	–	7	2	–	9
Idaho State	0	–	8	1	–	10
$ – Conference champion; ^ – FCS playoff participant; Rankings from The Sports Network poll

The 2010 Portland State Vikings football team represented Portland State University in the 2010 NCAA Division I FCS football season a member of the Big Sky Conference (Big Sky). The Vikings were led by first year head coach Nigel Burton and played their home games at Hillsboro Stadium as PGE Park was under renovation. They finished the season with a record of two wins and nine losses (2–9, 1–7 Big Sky)

== Schedule ==
Date	Time	Opponent	Site	TV	Result	Attendance
September 4	7:00 pm	at Arizona State*	Sun Devil Stadium; Tempe, Arizona		L 9–54	43,238
September 10	6:00 pm	at UC Davis*	Aggie Stadium; Davis, California		W 41–33	8,235
September 18	3:15 pm	at No. 5 (FBS) Oregon*	Autzen Stadium; Eugene, Oregon	CSNNW	L 0–69	58,086
October 2	5:00 pm	Idaho State	Hillsboro Stadium; Hillsboro, Oregon		W 38–3	5,025
October 9	12:30 pm	at No. 10 Montana State	Bobcat Stadium; Bozeman, Montana	CSNNW	L 31–44	15,227
October 16	5:00 pm	No. 11 Montana	Hillsboro Stadium; Hillsboro, Oregon	CSNNW	L 21–23	6,425
October 23	2:00 pm	at Weber State	Stewart Stadium; Ogden, Utah		L 41–44	4,880
October 30	5:00 pm	No. 8 Eastern Washington	Hillsboro Stadium; Hillsboro, Oregon (The Dam Cup)		L 17–50	4,097
November 6	2:00 pm	at Sacramento State	Hornet Stadium; Sacramento, California		L 15–28	7,812
November 13	1:00 pm	Northern Colorado^{†}	Hillsboro Stadium; Hillsboro, Oregon		L 30–35	4,032
November 10	2:05 pm	at Northern Arizona	Walkup Skydome; Flagstaff, Arizona	FCS	L 14–62	4,878
*Non-conference game; ^{†}Homecoming; Rankings from The Sports Network Poll released prior to the game; All times are in Pacific time
