= 2011 Weber State Wildcats football team =

American college football season

2011 Weber State Wildcats football
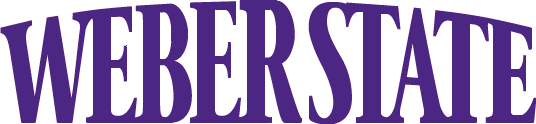
- Conference: Big Sky Conference
- Record: 5–6 (5–3 Big Sky)
- Head coach: Ron McBride (7th season)
- Offensive coordinator: Matt Hammer (5th season)
- Co-defensive coordinators: Jake Cookus (2nd season); Colton Swan (4th season)
- Home stadium: Stewart Stadium

2011 Big Sky Conference football standings
	Conf.			Overall
Team	W		L	W		L
No. 7 Montana State $^	7	–	1	10	–	3
No. ~~5~~ Montana† ^	5	–	1	6	–	2
Portland State	5	–	3	7	–	4
Eastern Washington	5	–	3	6	–	5
Weber State	5	–	3	5	–	6
Northern Arizona	3	–	5	4	–	7
Sacramento State	3	–	5	4	–	7
Idaho State*	1	–	7	2	–	9
Northern Colorado	0	–	8	0	–	11
$ – Conference champion; ^ – FCS playoff participant; † Montana vacated two conference wins, five total wins, their conference co-championship, and playoff participation (three games, including two of the five total wins) in 2011 * Idaho State ineligible for FCS playoffs due to APR violations; Rankings from The Sports Network poll, using Montana's later-diminished W–L record

The 2011 Weber State Wildcats football team represented Weber State University in the 2011 NCAA Division I FCS football season. The Wildcats were led by seventh year head coach Ron McBride and played their home games at Stewart Stadium. They are a member of the Big Sky Conference. They finished the season 5–6, 5–3 in Big Sky play to finish in a tie for third place.

== Schedule ==
Date	Time	Opponent	Site	TV	Result	Attendance
September 3	7:00 pm	at Wyoming*	War Memorial Stadium; Laramie, WY		L 32–35	21,492
September 10	6:00 pm	at Utah State*	Romney Stadium; Logan, UT	ESPN3	L 17–54	18,239
September 17	6:00 pm	No. 20 Sacramento State	Stewart Stadium; Ogden, Utah		W 49–17	8,362
September 24	1:30 pm	at Northern Colorado	Nottingham Field; Greeley, CO	ALT/CSNNW/CSNCA	W 45–21	5,692
October 1	1:30 pm	at Eastern Washington	Roos Field; Cheney, WA	ALT/CSNNW/CSNCA	L 21–27	7,427
October 15	4:00 pm	Idaho State^{†}	Stewart Stadium; Ogden, UT		W 39–12	11,297
October 22	4:00 pm	Southern Utah*	Stewart Stadium; Ogden, UT		L 28–35	8,657
October 29	1:00 pm	at No. 11 Montana	Washington–Grizzly Stadium; Missoula, MT	KPAX	L 10–45	25,401
November 5	1:30 pm	No. 2 Montana State	Stewart Stadium; Ogden, UT	ALT/CSNNW/CSNCA	L 24–44	6,505
November 12	1:30 pm	Northern Arizona	Stewart Stadium; Ogden, UT		W 34–31	7,614
November 19	2:00 pm	at No. 25 Portland State	Jeld-Wen Field; Portland, OR		W 48–33	6,072
*Non-conference game; ^{†}Homecoming; Rankings from The Sports Network Poll released prior to the game; All times are in Mountain time
