= 2011 Portland State Vikings football team =

American college football season

2011 Portland State Vikings football
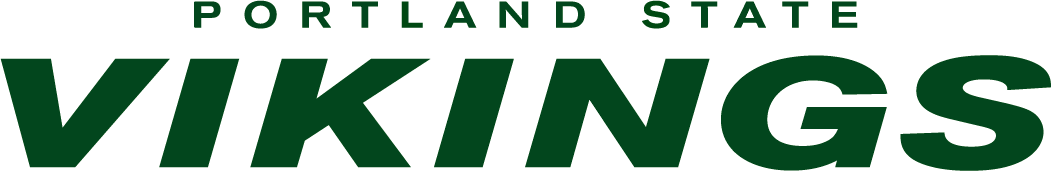
- Conference: Big Sky Conference
- Record: 7–4 (5–3 Big Sky)
- Head coach: Nigel Burton (2nd season)
- Offensive coordinator: Bruce Barnum (2nd season)
- Offensive scheme: Pistol
- Defensive coordinator: Eric Jackson (2nd season)
- Base defense: 4–3
- Home stadium: Jeld-Wen Field

2011 Big Sky Conference football standings
	Conf.			Overall
Team	W		L	W		L
No. 7 Montana State $^	7	–	1	10	–	3
No. ~~5~~ Montana† ^	5	–	1	6	–	2
Portland State	5	–	3	7	–	4
Eastern Washington	5	–	3	6	–	5
Weber State	5	–	3	5	–	6
Northern Arizona	3	–	5	4	–	7
Sacramento State	3	–	5	4	–	7
Idaho State*	1	–	7	2	–	9
Northern Colorado	0	–	8	0	–	11
$ – Conference champion; ^ – FCS playoff participant; † Montana vacated two conference wins, five total wins, their conference co-championship, and playoff participation (three games, including two of the five total wins) in 2011 * Idaho State ineligible for FCS playoffs due to APR violations; Rankings from The Sports Network poll, using Montana's later-diminished W–L record

The 2011 Portland State Vikings football team represented Portland State University in the 2011 NCAA Division I FCS football season. The Vikings were led by second year head coach Nigel Burton and played their home games at Jeld-Wen Field. They are a member of the Big Sky Conference. They finished the season 7–4, 5–3 in Big Sky play to finish in a tie for third place.

== Schedule ==
Date	Time	Opponent	Rank	Site	TV	Result	Attendance
September 3	7:05 pm	Southern Oregon*		Jeld-Wen Field; Portland, OR	CSNNW	W 52–0	4,953
September 17	5:00 pm	Northern Arizona		Jeld-Wen Field; Portland, OR	CSNNW	W 31–29	5,479
September 24	11:00 am	at No. 20 (FBS) TCU*		Amon G. Carter Stadium; Fort Worth, TX		L 13–55	33,825
October 1	12:30 pm	at Idaho State		Holt Arena; Pocatello, ID		W 42–35	8,288
October 8	1:00 pm	No. 3 Montana State		Jeld-Wen Field; Portland, OR	CSNNW/Max Media	L 36–38	9,054
October 15	12:00 pm	at No. 14 Montana		Washington–Grizzly Stadium; Missoula, MT	CSNNW/KPAX	L 24–30	25,744
October 22	5:00 pm	Willamette*		Jeld-Wen Field; Portland, OR		W 36–10	5,491
October 29	1:00 pm	at Eastern Washington		Roos Field; Cheney, WA (The Dam Cup)	SWX/CSNNW	W 43–26	9,003
November 5	1:00 pm	Sacramento State		Jeld-Wen Field; Portland, OR		W 29–20	4,635
November 12	11:05 am	at Northern Colorado		Nottingham Field; Greeley, CO		W 23–17	3,682
November 19	1:00 pm	Weber State	No. 25	Jeld-Wen Field; Portland, OR		L 33–48	6,072
*Non-conference game; Rankings from The Sports Network Poll released prior to the game; All times are in Pacific time
