= 2010 Northern Arizona Lumberjacks football team =

American college football season

2010 Northern Arizona Lumberjacks football
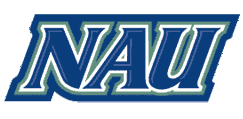
- Conference: Big Sky Conference
- Record: 6–5 (4–4 Big Sky)
- Head coach: Jerome Souers (13th season)
- Offensive coordinator: Brian Lindgren (2nd season)
- Defensive coordinator: Andy Thompson (2nd season)
- Home stadium: Walkup Skydome

2010 Big Sky Conference football standings
| | Conf. | | | Overall |
| Team | W | | L | W | | L |
|---|---|---|---|---|---|---|
| No. 1 Eastern Washington +^ | 7 | – | 1 | 13 | – | 2 |
| No. 11 Montana State +^ | 7 | – | 1 | 9 | – | 3 |
| No. 20 Montana | 5 | – | 3 | 7 | – | 4 |
| Weber State | 5 | – | 3 | 6 | – | 5 |
| Sacramento State | 5 | – | 3 | 6 | – | 5 |
| Northern Arizona | 4 | – | 4 | 6 | – | 5 |
| Northern Colorado | 2 | – | 6 | 3 | – | 8 |
| Portland State | 1 | – | 7 | 2 | – | 9 |
| Idaho State | 0 | – | 8 | 1 | – | 10 |
$ – Conference champion; ^ – FCS playoff participant; Rankings from The Sports Network poll

The 2010 Northern Arizona Lumberjacks football team represented Northern Arizona University as a member of the Big Sky Conference during the 2010 NCAA Division I FCS football season . The Lumberjacks were led by 13th-year head coach Jerome Souers and played their home games at the Walkup Skydome. They finished the season with an overall record of 6–5 and a mark of 4–4 in conference play, placing sixth in Big Sky.

== Schedule ==
| Date | Time | Opponent | Rank | Site | TV | Result | Attendance |
|---|---|---|---|---|---|---|---|
| September 2 | 7:00 pm | Western New Mexico* | | Walkup Skydome; Flagstaff, AZ | | W 48–0 | 7,142 |
| September 11 | 7:00 pm | at Arizona State* | | Sun Devil Stadium; Tempe, AZ | FSAZ | L 20–41 | 49,043 |
| September 25 | 2:30 pm | at Idaho State | | Holt Arena; Pocatello, ID | | W 32–7 | 6,626 |
| October 2 | 12:00 pm | at Southern Utah* | | Eccles Coliseum; Cedar City, UT (rivalry) | | W 26–23 | 7,111 |
| October 9 | 1:05 pm | at No. 13 Eastern Washington | | Roos Field; Cheney, WA | | L 14–21 | 7,472 |
| October 16 | 3:05 pm | No. 9 Montana State | | Walkup Skydome; Flagstaff, AZ | | W 34–7 | 12,155 |
| October 23 | 12:00 pm | at No. 7 Montana | No. 22 | Washington–Grizzly Stadium; Missoula, MT | | L 21–24 | 25,323 |
| October 30 | 3:05 pm | Sacramento State^{†} | | Walkup Skydome; Flagstaff, AZ | FCS | L 10–40 | 6,729 |
| November 6 | 12:35 pm | at Northern Colorado | | Nottingham Field; Greeley, CO | | W 21–14 | 3,463 |
| November 13 | 3:00 pm | Weber State | | Walkup Skydome; Flagstaff, AZ | FCS | L 26–27 | 6,087 |
| November 20 | 3:00 pm | Portland State | | Walkup Skydome; Flagstaff, AZ | FCS | W 62–14 | 4,878 |
*Non-conference game; ^{†}Homecoming; Rankings from The Sports Network Poll released prior to the game; All times are in Mountain time
