= 2010 Montana Grizzlies football team =

American college football season

2010 Montana Grizzlies football
- Conference: Big Sky Conference

Ranking
- Sports Network: No. 20
- FCS Coaches: No. 21
- Record: 7–4 (5–3 Big Sky)
- Head coach: Robin Pflugrad (1st season)
- Offensive coordinator: Jonathan Smith (1st season)
- Offensive scheme: Multiple
- Defensive coordinator: Mike Breske (1st season)
- Base defense: Multiple 3–4
- Home stadium: Washington–Grizzly Stadium

2010 Big Sky Conference football standings
| | Conf. | | | Overall |
| Team | W | | L | W | | L |
|---|---|---|---|---|---|---|
| No. 1 Eastern Washington +^ | 7 | – | 1 | 13 | – | 2 |
| No. 11 Montana State +^ | 7 | – | 1 | 9 | – | 3 |
| No. 20 Montana | 5 | – | 3 | 7 | – | 4 |
| Weber State | 5 | – | 3 | 6 | – | 5 |
| Sacramento State | 5 | – | 3 | 6 | – | 5 |
| Northern Arizona | 4 | – | 4 | 6 | – | 5 |
| Northern Colorado | 2 | – | 6 | 3 | – | 8 |
| Portland State | 1 | – | 7 | 2 | – | 9 |
| Idaho State | 0 | – | 8 | 1 | – | 10 |
$ – Conference champion; ^ – FCS playoff participant; Rankings from The Sports Network poll

The 2010 Montana Grizzlies football team represented the University of Montana in the 2010 NCAA Division I FCS football season. The Grizzlies, charter members of the Big Sky Conference, were led by first-year head coach Robin Pflugrad and played their home games on campus at Washington–Grizzly Stadium.

== Schedule ==
| Date | Time | Opponent | Rank | Site | TV | Result | Attendance |
|---|---|---|---|---|---|---|---|
| September 4 | 1:05 pm | Western State (CO)* | No. 2 | Washington–Grizzly Stadium; Missoula, MT | KPAX | W 73–2 | 25,663 |
| September 11 | 7:05 pm | at Cal Poly* | No. 1 | Alex G. Spanos Stadium; San Luis Obispo, CA | KPAX | L 33–35 | 8,027 |
| September 18 | 5:05 pm | at No. 18 Eastern Washington | No. 6 | Roos Field; Cheney, WA (Governors Cup) | KPAX | L 27-36 | 11,702 |
| September 25 | 1:05 pm | Sacramento State^{†} | No. 14 | Washington–Grizzly Stadium; Missoula, MT | KPAX | W 28–25 | 25,965 |
| October 2 | 1:35 pm | Northern Colorado | No. 12 | Nottingham Field; Greeley, CO | KPAX | W 30–7 | 6,114 |
| October 9 | 1:05 pm | Idaho State | No. 12 | Washington–Grizzly Stadium; Missoula, MT | KPAX | W 47–28 | 25,568 |
| October 16 | 6:05 pm | at Portland State | No. 11 | Hillsboro Stadium; Hillsboro, OR | KPAX | W 23–21 | 6,425 |
| October 23 | 1:05 pm | No. 21 Northern Arizona | No. 7 | Washington–Grizzly Stadium; Missoula, MT | KPAX | W 24–21 | 25,323 |
| October 30 | 1:05 pm | Weber State | No. 7 | Stewart Stadium; Ogden, UT | KPAX | L 21-30 | 6,782 |
| November 13 | 12:05 pm | North Dakota* | No. 17 | Washington–Grizzly Stadium; Missoula, MT | KPAX | W 27-17 | 24,151 |
| November 20 | 12:05 pm | No. 8 Montana State | No. 14 | Washington–Grizzly Stadium; Missoula, MT (rivalry) | KPAX | L 16-21 | 26,019 |
*Non-conference game; ^{†}Homecoming; Rankings from The Sports Network Poll released prior to the game; All times are in Mountain time

== Game summaries ==
Final score source

=== Western State (CO) ===
| | 1 | 2 | 3 | 4 | Total |
|---|---|---|---|---|---|
| Western State | 2 | 0 | 0 | 0 | 2 |
| Montana | 28 | 14 | 17 | 14 | 73 |

=== Cal Poly ===
| | 1 | 2 | 3 | 4 | Total |
|---|---|---|---|---|---|
| Montana | 14 | 0 | 6 | 13 | 33 |
| Cal Poly | 7 | 7 | 14 | 7 | 35 |

=== Eastern Washington ===
| | 1 | 2 | 3 | 4 | Total |
|---|---|---|---|---|---|
| #6 Montana | 14 | 7 | 3 | 3 | 27 |
| #18 Eastern Washington | 7 | 7 | 10 | 12 | 36 |

=== Sacramento State ===
| | 1 | 2 | 3 | 4 | Total |
|---|---|---|---|---|---|
| Sacramento State | 6 | 10 | 3 | 6 | 25 |
| Montana | 7 | 7 | 7 | 7 | 28 |

=== Northern Colorado ===
| | 1 | 2 | 3 | 4 | Total |
|---|---|---|---|---|---|
| Montana | 10 | 14 | 6 | 0 | 30 |
| Northern Colorado | 0 | 0 | 0 | 7 | 7 |

=== Idaho State ===
| | 1 | 2 | 3 | 4 | Total |
|---|---|---|---|---|---|
| Idaho State | 0 | 7 | 7 | 14 | 28 |
| Montana | 10 | 13 | 14 | 10 | 47 |

=== Portland State ===
| | 1 | 2 | 3 | 4 | Total |
|---|---|---|---|---|---|
| Montana | 0 | 7 | 7 | 9 | 23 |
| Portland State | 0 | 7 | 7 | 7 | 21 |

=== Northern Arizona ===
| | 1 | 2 | 3 | 4 | Total |
|---|---|---|---|---|---|
| Northern Arizona | 0 | 9 | 6 | 6 | 21 |
| Montana | 7 | 0 | 10 | 7 | 24 |

=== Weber State ===
| | 1 | 2 | 3 | 4 | Total |
|---|---|---|---|---|---|
| Montana | 7 | 14 | 0 | 0 | 21 |
| Weber State | 6 | 7 | 14 | 3 | 30 |

=== North Dakota ===
| | 1 | 2 | 3 | 4 | Total |
|---|---|---|---|---|---|
| North Dakota | 0 | 10 | 7 | 0 | 17 |
| Montana | 7 | 6 | 7 | 7 | 27 |

=== Montana State ===
| | 1 | 2 | 3 | 4 | Total |
|---|---|---|---|---|---|
| Montana State | 14 | 7 | 0 | 0 | 21 |
| Montana | 14 | 0 | 2 | 0 | 16 |
