= 2011 Sacramento State Hornets football team =

American college football season

2011 Sacramento State Hornets football
- Conference: Big Sky Conference
- Record: 4–7 (3–5 Big Sky)
- Head coach: Marshall Sperbeck (5th season)
- Defensive coordinator: Anthony Parker (2nd season)
- Home stadium: Hornet Stadium

2011 Big Sky Conference football standings
	Conf.			Overall
Team	W		L	W		L
No. 7 Montana State $^	7	–	1	10	–	3
No. ~~5~~ Montana† ^	5	–	1	6	–	2
Portland State	5	–	3	7	–	4
Eastern Washington	5	–	3	6	–	5
Weber State	5	–	3	5	–	6
Northern Arizona	3	–	5	4	–	7
Sacramento State	3	–	5	4	–	7
Idaho State*	1	–	7	2	–	9
Northern Colorado	0	–	8	0	–	11
$ – Conference champion; ^ – FCS playoff participant; † Montana vacated two conference wins, five total wins, their conference co-championship, and playoff participation (three games, including two of the five total wins) in 2011 * Idaho State ineligible for FCS playoffs due to APR violations; Rankings from The Sports Network poll, using Montana's later-diminished W–L record

The 2011 Sacramento State Hornets football team represented California State University, Sacramento as a member of the Big Sky Conference during the 2011 NCAA Division I FCS football season. Led by fifth-year head coach Marshall Sperbeck, Sacramento State compiled an overall record of 4–7 with a mark of 3–5 in conference play, tying for sixth place in the Big Sky. The Hornets played home games at Hornet Stadium in Sacramento, California.

Sacramento State opened the season with a 29–28 win over Oregon State of the NCAA Division I Football Bowl Subdivision (FBS).

== Schedule ==
Date	Time	Opponent	Rank	Site	TV	Result	Attendance
September 3	1:00 pm	at Oregon State*	No. 24	Reser Stadium; Corvallis, OR		W 29–28	41,581
September 10	12:00 pm	at Southern Utah*	No. 12	Eccles Coliseum; Cedar City, UT	KCRA 3.2 MOREtv/KMYU	L 14–35	6,238
September 17	5:00 pm	at Weber State	No. 20	Stewart Stadium; Ogden, UT		L 17–49	8,362
September 24	6:00 pm	No. 10 Montana		Hornet Stadium; Sacramento, CA	KPAX	W 42–28	12,751
October 1	12:30 pm	at No. 4 Montana State	No. 25	Bobcat Stadium; Bozeman, MT	Max Media	L 21–31	18,847
October 8	12:30 pm	at Northern Colorado		Nottingham Field; Greeley, CO		W 14–0	1,189
October 22	6:00 pm	Eastern Washington^{†}		Hornet Stadium; Sacramento, CA		L 35–42 ^{OT}	10,705
October 29	6:00 pm	at Northern Arizona		Hornet Stadium; Sacramento, CA	NAU-TV/FCSP	L 26–27	6,119
November 5	1:00 pm	at Portland State		Jeld-Wen Field; Portland, OR		L 20–29	4,635
November 12	6:00 pm	Idaho State		Hornet Stadium; Sacramento, CA		W 24–9	5,317
November 19	2:00 pm	UC Davis*		Hornet Stadium; Sacramento, CA (Causeway Classic)	CSNCA	L 19–23	12,874
*Non-conference game; ^{†}Homecoming; Rankings from The Sports Network Poll released prior to the game; All times are in Pacific time
