= 2010 Northern Colorado Bears football team =

American college football season

2010 Northern Colorado Bears football
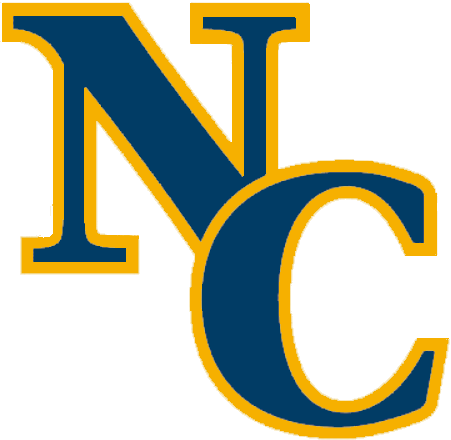
- Conference: Big Sky Conference
- Record: 3–8 (2–6 Big Sky)
- Head coach: Scott Downing (5th season)
- Home stadium: Nottingham Field

2010 Big Sky Conference football standings
	Conf.			Overall
Team	W		L	W		L
No. 1 Eastern Washington +^	7	–	1	13	–	2
No. 11 Montana State +^	7	–	1	9	–	3
No. 20 Montana	5	–	3	7	–	4
Weber State	5	–	3	6	–	5
Sacramento State	5	–	3	6	–	5
Northern Arizona	4	–	4	6	–	5
Northern Colorado	2	–	6	3	–	8
Portland State	1	–	7	2	–	9
Idaho State	0	–	8	1	–	10
$ – Conference champion; ^ – FCS playoff participant; Rankings from The Sports Network poll

The 2010 Northern Colorado Bears football team represented the University of Northern Colorado in the 2010 NCAA Division I FCS football season. The Bears were led by fifth-year head coach Scott Downing and played their home games at Nottingham Field. They were a member of the Big Sky Conference. They finished the season 3–8 overall and 2–6 in Big Sky play place seventh.

Downing was fired at the conclusion of the season. He finished at Northern Colorado with a five-year record of 9–47.

== Schedule ==
Date	Time	Opponent	Site	Result
September 4	1:35 p.m.	Adams State*	Nottingham Field; Greeley, CO	W 54–0
September 11	6:50 p.m.	at No. 20 Weber State	Stewart Stadium; Ogden, UT	L 47–50
September 18	1:35 p.m.	Idaho State	Nottingham Field; Greeley, CO	W 35–21
September 25	12:00 p.m.	at No. 25 (FBS) Michigan State*	Spartan Stadium; East Lansing, MI	L 7–45
October 2	1:35 p.m.	No. 12 Montana	Nottingham Field; Greeley, CO	L 7–30
October 9	2:50 p.m.	at Sacramento State	Hornet Stadium; Sacramento, CA	L 7–42
October 16	1:35 p.m.	No. 12 Eastern Washington	Nottingham Field; Greeley, CO	L 28–35
October 23	1:50 p.m.	at No. 15 Montana State	Bobcat Stadium; Bozeman, MT	L 35–37
October 30	4:50 p.m.	at South Dakota*	DakotaDome; Vermillion, SD	L 6–34
November 6	1:35 p.m.	Northern Arizona	Nottingham Field; Greeley, CO	L 14–21
November 13	1:50 p.m.	at Portland State	Hillsboro Stadium; Hillsboro, OR	W 35–30
*Non-conference game; Rankings from The Sports Network Poll released prior to the game; All times are in Mountain time
