= 2010 Idaho State Bengals football team =

American college football season

2010 Idaho State Bengals football
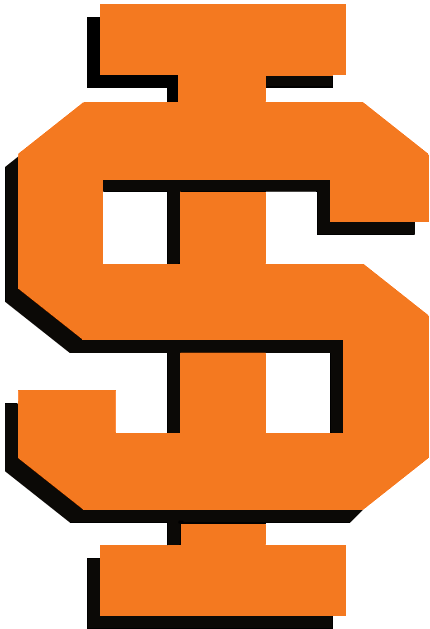
- Conference: Big Sky Conference
- Record: 1–10 (0–8 Big Sky)
- Head coach: John Zamberlin (4th season)
- Offensive coordinator: Phil Earley (1st season)
- Offensive scheme: Multiple
- Base defense: 3–4
- Home stadium: Holt Arena

2010 Big Sky Conference football standings
	Conf.			Overall
Team	W		L	W		L
No. 1 Eastern Washington +^	7	–	1	13	–	2
No. 11 Montana State +^	7	–	1	9	–	3
No. 20 Montana	5	–	3	7	–	4
Weber State	5	–	3	6	–	5
Sacramento State	5	–	3	6	–	5
Northern Arizona	4	–	4	6	–	5
Northern Colorado	2	–	6	3	–	8
Portland State	1	–	7	2	–	9
Idaho State	0	–	8	1	–	10
$ – Conference champion; ^ – FCS playoff participant; Rankings from The Sports Network poll

The 2010 Idaho State Bengals football team represented Idaho State University as a member of the Big Sky Conference during the 2010 NCAA Division I FCS football season. Led by fourth-year head coach John Zamberlin, the Bengals compiled an overall record of 1–10 with a mark of 0–8 in conference play, placing last in the Big Sky. Idaho State played home games at Holt Arena in Pocatello, Idaho.

Zamberlin was fired before the team's last game of the season. He finished at Idaho State with a four-year record of 6–39.

== Schedule ==
Date	Time	Opponent	Site	TV	Result	Attendance	Source
September 4	3:35 pm	Montana Western*	Holt Arena; Pocatello, ID		W 32–3		
September 11	6:05 pm	at Utah State*	Romney Stadium; Logan, UT		L 17–38	18,347	
September 18	1:35 pm	at Northern Colorado	Nottingham Field; Greeley, CO		L 21–35		
September 25	3:35 pm	Northern Arizona	Holt Arena; Pocatello, ID		L 7–32	6,626	
October 2	6:05 pm	at Portland State	Hillsboro Stadium; Hillsboro, OR		L 3–38	5,025	
October 9	1:05 pm	at No. 12 Montana	Washington–Grizzly Stadium; Missoula, MT	KPAX	L 28–47	25,568	
October 16	3:35 pm	Weber State	Holt Arena; Pocatello, ID		L 13–16	5,083	
October 30	1:35 pm	No. 13 Montana State	Holt Arena; Pocatello, ID		L 20–23 ^{OT}		
November 6	10:30 am	at Georgia*	Sanford Stadium; Athens, GA	ESPN3	L 7–55	92,746	
November 13	3:35 pm	Sacramento State	Holt Arena; Pocatello, ID		L 17–45	4,694	
November 20	2:05 pm	at No. 3 Eastern Washington	Roos Field; Cheney, WA	SWX	L 7–34	5,781	
*Non-conference game; Rankings from The Sports Network Poll released prior to the game; All times are in Mountain time
