= 2010 Sacramento State Hornets football team =

American college football season

2010 Sacramento State Hornets football
- Conference: Big Sky Conference
- Record: 6–5 (5–3 Big Sky)
- Head coach: Marshall Sperbeck (4th season)
- Defensive coordinator: Anthony Parker (1st season)
- Home stadium: Hornet Stadium

2010 Big Sky Conference football standings
	Conf.			Overall
Team	W		L	W		L
No. 1 Eastern Washington +^	7	–	1	13	–	2
No. 11 Montana State +^	7	–	1	9	–	3
No. 20 Montana	5	–	3	7	–	4
Weber State	5	–	3	6	–	5
Sacramento State	5	–	3	6	–	5
Northern Arizona	4	–	4	6	–	5
Northern Colorado	2	–	6	3	–	8
Portland State	1	–	7	2	–	9
Idaho State	0	–	8	1	–	10
$ – Conference champion; ^ – FCS playoff participant; Rankings from The Sports Network poll

The 2010 Sacramento State Hornets football team represented California State University, Sacramento as a member of the Big Sky Conference during the 2010 NCAA Division I FCS football season. Led by fourth-year head coach Marshall Sperbeck, Sacramento State compiled an overall record of 6–5 with a mark of 5–3 in conference play, placing in a three-way tie for third in the Big Sky. The team outscored its opponents 353 to 272 for the season. This was the first winning season for the Hornets since the 2000 team finished 7–4. The Hornets played home games at Hornet Stadium in Sacramento, California.

== Schedule ==
Date	Opponent	Site	Result	Attendance	Source
September 4	at Stanford*	Stanford Stadium; Stanford, CA	L 17–52	30,626	
September 11	Western Oregon*	Hornet Stadium; Sacramento, CA	W 31–17	7,811	
September 18	No. 21 Weber State	Hornet Stadium; Sacramento, CA	W 24–17	6,937	
September 25	at No. 14 Montana	Washington–Grizzly Stadium; Missoula, MT	L 25–28	25,965	
October 2	No. 10 Montana State	Hornet Stadium; Sacramento, CA	L 61–64 ^{OT}	6,311	
October 9	Northern Colorado	Hornet Stadium; Sacramento, CA	W 42–7	9,011	
October 23	at No. 8 Eastern Washington	Roos Field; Cheney, WA	L 24–28	7,147	
October 30	at No. 25 Northern Arizona	Walkup Skydome; Flagstaff, AZ	W 40–10	6,729	
November 6	Portland State	Hornet Stadium; Sacramento, CA	W 28–15	7,812	
November 13	at Idaho State	Holt Arena; Pocatello, ID	W 45–17	4,694	
November 20	at UC Davis*	Aggie Stadium; Davis, CA (Causeway Classic)	L 16–17	9,785	
*Non-conference game; Rankings from The Sports Network Poll released prior to the game

== Team players in the NFL ==
No Sacramento State players were selected in the 2011 NFL draft.

The following finished their college career in 2010, were not drafted, but played in the NFL.

Player	Position	First NFL team
McLeod Bethel-Thompson	Quarterback	2012 Minnesota Vikings
