= 2010 Southern Utah Thunderbirds football team =

American college football season

2010 Southern Utah Thunderbirds football

GWC champion
- Conference: Great West Conference
- Record: 6–5 (4–0 Great West)
- Head coach: Ed Lamb (3rd season)
- Offensive coordinator: Steve Clark (3rd season)
- Defensive coordinator: Justin Ena (1st season)
- Home stadium: Eccles Coliseum

2010 Great West Conference football standings
	Conf.			Overall
Team	W		L	W		L
Southern Utah $	4	–	0	6	–	5
UC Davis	3	–	1	6	–	5
No. 24 Cal Poly	2	–	2	7	–	4
South Dakota	1	–	3	4	–	7
North Dakota	0	–	4	3	–	8
$ – Conference champion; Rankings from The Sports Network poll

The 2010 Southern Utah Thunderbirds football team represented Southern Utah University as a member of the Great West Conference (GWC) during the 2010 NCAA Division I FCS football season. Led by third-year head coach Ed Lamb, the Thunderbirds compiled an overall record of 6–5 with a mark of 4–0 in conference play, winning the GWC title. The team played home games at Eccles Coliseum in Cedar City, Utah.

== Schedule ==
Date	Time	Opponent	Site	TV	Result	Attendance	Source
September 4	7:00 p.m.	at Wyoming*	War Memorial Stadium; Laramie, WY		L 20–28	20,043	
September 11		San Diego*	Eccles Coliseum; Cedar City, UT		W 32–3		
September 18	6:00 p.m.	at San Jose State*	Spartan Stadium; San Jose, CA		L 11–16	16,739	
September 25	5:00 p.m.	at Texas State*	Bobcat Stadium; San Marcos, TX		L 28–42	13,742	
October 2	1:00 p.m.	Northern Arizona*	Eccles Coliseum; Cedar City, UT (rivalry)		L 23–26	7,111	
October 9	2:00 p.m.	at North Dakota	Alerus Center; Grand Forks, ND		W 31–21	10,215	
October 16	3:00 p.m.	No. 13 Cal Poly^{†}	Eccles Coliseum; Cedar City, UT		W 20–7	8,219	
October 23		South Dakota	Eccles Coliseum; Cedar City, UT		W 31–13		
October 30	5:00 p.m.	at UC Davis	Aggie Stadium; Davis, CA		W 55–24	5,368	
November 6		Dixie State*	Eccles Coliseum; Cedar City, UT		W 52–0		
November 13	2:05 p.m.	at No. 5 Eastern Washington*	Roos Field; Cheney, WA	SWX	L 24–31	5,357	
*Non-conference game; ^{†}Homecoming; Rankings from The Sports Network Poll released prior to the game; All times are in Mountain time
