= 2011 Idaho State Bengals football team =

American college football season

2011 Idaho State Bengals football
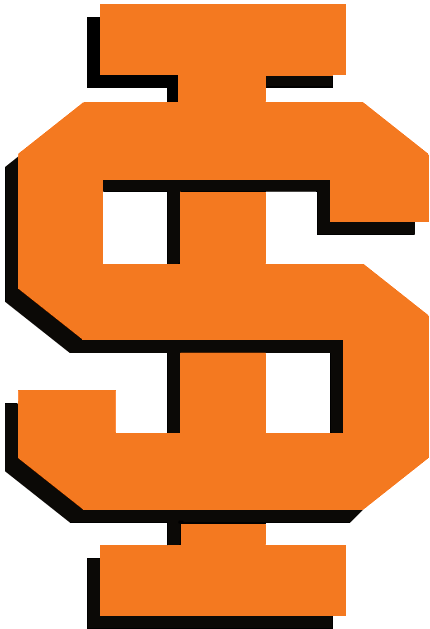
- Conference: Big Sky Conference
- Record: 2–9 (1–7 Big Sky)
- Head coach: Mike Kramer (1st season)
- Offensive coordinator: Don Bailey (1st season)
- Home stadium: Holt Arena

2011 Big Sky Conference football standings
| | Conf. | | | Overall |
| Team | W | | L | W | | L |
|---|---|---|---|---|---|---|
| No. 7 Montana State $^ | 7 | – | 1 | 10 | – | 3 |
| No. ~~5~~ Montana† ^ | 5 | – | 1 | 6 | – | 2 |
| Portland State | 5 | – | 3 | 7 | – | 4 |
| Eastern Washington | 5 | – | 3 | 6 | – | 5 |
| Weber State | 5 | – | 3 | 5 | – | 6 |
| Northern Arizona | 3 | – | 5 | 4 | – | 7 |
| Sacramento State | 3 | – | 5 | 4 | – | 7 |
| Idaho State* | 1 | – | 7 | 2 | – | 9 |
| Northern Colorado | 0 | – | 8 | 0 | – | 11 |
$ – Conference champion; ^ – FCS playoff participant; † Montana vacated two conference wins, five total wins, their conference co-championship, and playoff participation (three games, including two of the five total wins) in 2011 * Idaho State ineligible for FCS playoffs due to APR violations; Rankings from The Sports Network poll, using Montana's later-diminished W–L record

The 2011 Idaho State Bengals football team represented Idaho State University as a member of the Big Sky Conference during the 2011 NCAA Division I FCS football season. Led by first-year head coach Mike Kramer, the Bengals compiled an overall record of 2–9 with a mark of 1–7 in conference play, placing eighth in the Big Sky. Idaho State played their home games at Holt Arena in Pocatello, Idaho.

In the Spring of 2011, Idaho state was one of three teams ruled ineligible for the season's NCAA Division I Football Championship playoffs due to Academic Progress Rate (APR) violations.

== Schedule ==
| Date | Time | Opponent | Site | TV | Result | Attendance |
|---|---|---|---|---|---|---|
| September 3 | 1:00 pm | at Washington State* | Martin Stadium; Pullman, WA | | L 21–64 | 22,034 |
| September 10 | 4:00 pm | Western State* | Holt Arena; Pocatello, ID | | W 44–7 | 8,002 |
| September 17 | 4:00 pm | Northern Colorado | Holt Arena; Pocatello, ID | | W 50–20 | 6,350 |
| September 24 | 3:00 pm | at Northern Arizona | Walkup Skydome; Flagstaff, AZ | NAU-TV/ FCS Pacific | L 3–20 | 9,304 |
| October 1 | 1:30 pm | Portland State^{†} | Holt Arena; Pocatello, ID | | L 35–42 | 8,288 |
| October 8 | 4:00 pm | No. 16 Montana | Holt Arena; Pocatello, ID | KPAX | L 0–33 | 9,124 |
| October 15 | 4:00 pm | at Weber State | Stewart Stadium; Ogden, UT | | L 12–39 | 11,297 |
| October 22 | 1:00 pm | at BYU* | LaVell Edwards Stadium; Provo, UT | BYUtv | L 3–56 | 60,043 |
| October 29 | 12:00 pm | at No. 4 Montana State | Bobcat Stadium; Bozeman, MT | Max Media | L 13–54 | 16,517 |
| November 12 | 7:00 pm | at Sacramento State | Hornet Stadium; Sacramento, CA | | L 9–24 | 5,317 |
| November 19 | 4:00 pm | Eastern Washington | Holt Arena; Pocatello, ID | | L 14–45 | 5,794 |
*Non-conference game; ^{†}Homecoming; Rankings from The Sports Network Poll released prior to the game; All times are in Mountain time
