= 2010 Weber State Wildcats football team =

American college football season

2010 Weber State Wildcats football
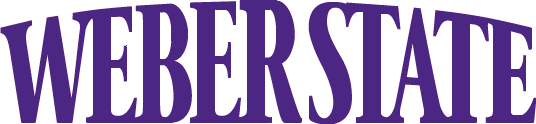
- Conference: Big Sky Conference
- Record: 6–5 (5–3 Big Sky)
- Head coach: Ron McBride (6th season)
- Offensive coordinator: Matt Hammer (4th season)
- Co-defensive coordinators: Jake Cookus (1st season); Colton Swan (3rd season)
- Home stadium: Stewart Stadium

2010 Big Sky Conference football standings
	Conf.			Overall
Team	W		L	W		L
No. 1 Eastern Washington +^	7	–	1	13	–	2
No. 11 Montana State +^	7	–	1	9	–	3
No. 20 Montana	5	–	3	7	–	4
Weber State	5	–	3	6	–	5
Sacramento State	5	–	3	6	–	5
Northern Arizona	4	–	4	6	–	5
Northern Colorado	2	–	6	3	–	8
Portland State	1	–	7	2	–	9
Idaho State	0	–	8	1	–	10
$ – Conference champion; ^ – FCS playoff participant; Rankings from The Sports Network poll

The 2010 Weber State Wildcats football team represented Weber State University for the 2010 NCAA Division I FCS football season under head coach Ron McBride. The Wildcats finished the regular season with a record of 6–5, 5–3 in Big Sky play to finish in a 3-way tie for 3rd place.

== Schedule ==
Date	Time	Opponent	Site	TV	Result	Attendance	Source
September 4	11:00 am	at Boston College*	Alumni Stadium; Chestnut Hill, MA	ESPN3	L 20–38	34,168	
September 11	6:00 pm	Northern Colorado	Stewart Stadium; Ogden, UT		W 50–47 ^{4OT}	7,219	
September 18	6:05 pm	at Sacramento State	Hornet Stadium; Sacramento, CA		L 17–24	6,937	
September 25	6:00 pm	UC Davis*^{†}	Stewart Stadium; Ogden, UT		W 20–9	10,221	
October 2	1:30 pm	No. 16 Eastern Washington	Stewart Stadium; Ogden, UT		L 24–35	5,462	
October 16	3:35 pm	at Idaho State	Holt Arena; Pocatello, ID		W 16–13	5,083	
October 23	3:00 pm	Portland State	Stewart Stadium; Ogden, UT		W 44–41	4,880	
October 30	1:35 pm	No. 7 Montana	Stewart Stadium; Ogden, UT		W 30–21	6,782	
November 6	12:07 pm	at No. 12 Montana State	Bobcat Stadium; Bozeman, MT		L 10–24	14,267	
November 13	3:07 pm	at Northern Arizona	Walkup Skydome; Flagstaff, AZ		W 27–26	6,087	
November 20	1:00 pm	at Texas Tech*	Jones AT&T Stadium; Lubbock, TX		L 21–64	55,083	
*Non-conference game; ^{†}Homecoming; Rankings from The Sports Network Poll released prior to the game; All times are in Mountain time
