= 2010 UC Davis Aggies football team =

American college football season

2010 UC Davis Aggies football
- Conference: Great West Conference
- Record: 6–5 (3–1 GWC)
- Head coach: Bob Biggs (18th season)
- Offensive coordinator: Mike Moroski (18th season)
- Defensive coordinator: Mark Johnson (2nd season)
- Home stadium: Aggie Stadium

2010 Great West Conference football standings
	Conf.			Overall
Team	W		L	W		L
Southern Utah $	4	–	0	6	–	5
UC Davis	3	–	1	6	–	5
No. 24 Cal Poly	2	–	2	7	–	4
South Dakota	1	–	3	4	–	7
North Dakota	0	–	4	3	–	8
$ – Conference champion; Rankings from The Sports Network poll

The 2010 UC Davis football team represented the University of California, Davis as a member of the Great West Conference (GWC) during the 2010 NCAA Division I FCS football season. Led by 18th-year head coach Bob Biggs, UC Davis compiled an overall record of 6–5 with a mark of 3–1 in conference play, placing second in the GWC. The team was outscored by its opponents 295 to 233 for the season. The Aggies played home games at Aggie Stadium in Davis, California.

== Schedule ==
Date	Time	Opponent	Site	Result	Attendance	Source
September 4	1:00 p.m.	at California*	California Memorial Stadium; Berkeley, CA	L 3–52	58,040	
September 11	6:00 p.m.	Portland State*	Aggie Stadium; Davis, CA	L 33–41	8,235	
September 18	6:05 p.m.	at San Diego*	Torero Stadium; San Diego, CA	W 38–24	6,000	
September 25	5:00 p.m.	at Weber State*	Wildcat Stadium; Ogden, UT	L 9–20	10,221	
October 2	5:00 p.m.	at San Jose State	Spartan Stadium; San Jose, CA	W 14–13	17,844	
October 9	6:00 p.m.	South Dakota^{†}	Aggie Stadium; Davis, CA	W 17–13	10,352	
October 23	2:00 p.m.	South Alabama*	Aggie Stadium; Davis, CA	L 21–24	6,835	
October 30	4:00 p.m.	Southern Utah	Aggie Stadium; Davis, CA	L 24–55	5,368	
November 6	10:00 a.m.	at North Dakota	Alerus Center; Grand Forks, ND	W 35–16	6,633	
November 13	6:05 p.m.	at No. 19 Cal Poly	Alex G. Spanos Stadium; San Luis Obispo, CA (Battle for the Golden Horseshoe)	W 22–21	11,075	
November 20	4:00 p.m.	Sacramento State*	Aggie Stadium; Davis, CA (Causeway Classic)	W 17–16	9,785	
*Non-conference game; ^{†}Homecoming; Rankings from The Sports Network Poll released prior to the game; All times are in Pacific time
