= 2010 Montana State Bobcats football team =

American college football season

2010 Montana State Bobcats football
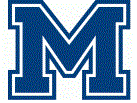

Big Sky co-champion

NCAA Division I Second Round, L 17–42 vs. North Dakota State
- Conference: Big Sky Conference

Ranking
- Sports Network: No. 11
- FCS Coaches: No. 11
- Record: 9–3 (7–1 Big Sky)
- Head coach: Rob Ash (4th season)
- Offensive coordinator: Brian Wright (1st season)
- Defensive coordinator: Jamie Marshall (4th season)
- Home stadium: Bobcat Stadium

2010 Big Sky Conference football standings
	Conf.			Overall
Team	W		L	W		L
No. 1 Eastern Washington +^	7	–	1	13	–	2
No. 11 Montana State +^	7	–	1	9	–	3
No. 20 Montana	5	–	3	7	–	4
Weber State	5	–	3	6	–	5
Sacramento State	5	–	3	6	–	5
Northern Arizona	4	–	4	6	–	5
Northern Colorado	2	–	6	3	–	8
Portland State	1	–	7	2	–	9
Idaho State	0	–	8	1	–	10
$ – Conference champion; ^ – FCS playoff participant; Rankings from The Sports Network poll

The 2010 Montana State Bobcats football team represented Montana State University in the 2010 NCAA Division I FCS football season. The team was led by fourth-year head coach Rob Ash and played its home games at Bobcat Stadium. The team finished the regular season with an 8–3 record, making them Big Sky Conference co-champions alongside Eastern Washington. The team qualified for the NCAA Division I Football Championship playoffs, in which they were eliminated in the second round by the North Dakota State Bison.

== Schedule ==
Date	Opponent	Rank	Site	Result	Source
September 4	Fort Lewis*	No. 24	Bobcat Stadium; Bozeman, MT	W 59–10	
September 11	at Washington State*	No. 24	Martin Stadium; Pullman, WA	L 22–23	
September 18	Drake*	No. 22	Bobcat Stadium; Bozeman, MT	W 48–21	
September 25	No. 9 Eastern Washington	No. 17	Bobcat Stadium; Bozeman, MT	W 30–7	
October 2	at Sacramento State	No. 10	Hornet Stadium; Sacramento, CA	W 64–61	
October 9	Portland State	No. 10	Bobcat Stadium; Bozeman, MT	W 44–31	
October 16	at Northern Arizona	No. 9	Walkup Skydome; Flagstaff, AZ	L 7–34	
October 23	Northern Colorado	No. 15	Bobcat Stadium; Bozeman, MT	W 37–35	
October 30	at Idaho State	No. 13	Holt Arena; Pocatello, ID	W 23–20	
November 6	Weber State	No. 12	Bobcat Stadium; Bozeman, MT	W 24–10	
November 20	at No. 11 Montana	No. 8	Washington–Grizzly Stadium; Missoula, MT (rivalry)	W 21–16	
December 4	No. 25 North Dakota State*	No. 6	Bobcat Stadium; Bozeman, MT (NCAA Division I Second Round)	L 17–42	
*Non-conference game; Rankings from The Sports Network Poll released prior to the game
