= 2011 Montana Grizzlies football team =

American college football season

2011 Montana Grizzlies football
- Conference: Big Sky Conference

Ranking
- Sports Network: No. ~~5~~
- FCS Coaches: No. ~~5~~
- Record: 6–2, 5 wins and 1 loss vacated (5–1 Big Sky, 2 wins vacated)
- Head coach: Robin Pflugrad (2nd season)
- Offensive coordinator: Jonathan Smith (2nd season)
- Offensive scheme: Multiple
- Defensive coordinator: Mike Breske (2nd season)
- Base defense: Multiple 3–4
- Home stadium: Washington–Grizzly Stadium

2011 Big Sky Conference football standings
	Conf.			Overall
Team	W		L	W		L
No. 7 Montana State $^	7	–	1	10	–	3
No. ~~5~~ Montana† ^	5	–	1	6	–	2
Portland State	5	–	3	7	–	4
Eastern Washington	5	–	3	6	–	5
Weber State	5	–	3	5	–	6
Northern Arizona	3	–	5	4	–	7
Sacramento State	3	–	5	4	–	7
Idaho State*	1	–	7	2	–	9
Northern Colorado	0	–	8	0	–	11
$ – Conference champion; ^ – FCS playoff participant; † Montana vacated two conference wins, five total wins, their conference co-championship, and playoff participation (three games, including two of the five total wins) in 2011 * Idaho State ineligible for FCS playoffs due to APR violations; Rankings from The Sports Network poll, using Montana's later-diminished W–L record

The 2011 Montana Grizzlies football team represented the University of Montana in the 2011 NCAA Division I FCS football season. They were led by second-year head coach Robin Pflugrad and played their home games at Washington–Grizzly Stadium. They are a member of the Big Sky Conference.

The team finished the regular season with an overall 9–2 record, 7–1 in Big Sky play. They then won two FCS playoff games, before being eliminated in the semifinals by Sam Houston State, thus ending their season with an overall 11–3 record. On July 26, 2013, Montana was sanctioned by the NCAA, which found that "boosters provided extra benefits to players." Montana vacated its last two conference games of the 2011 season (two wins), its last non-conference game of the regular season (one win), and its participation in the NCAA playoffs (two wins, semifinals loss), resulting in an official record of 6–2 overall, 5–1 in conference play.

== Schedule ==
Date	Time	Opponent	Rank	Site	TV	Result	Attendance
September 3	4:00 p.m.	at Tennessee*	No. 12	Neyland Stadium; Knoxville, TN	ESPN3	L 16–42	94,661
September 10	1:05 p.m.	Cal Poly*	No. 15	Washington–Grizzly Stadium; Missoula, MT	KWBM	W 37–23	25,855
September 17	12:05 p.m.	No. 10 Eastern Washington	No. 12	Washington–Grizzly Stadium; Missoula, MT (Governors Cup)	KPAX	W 17–14	26,066
September 24	7:05 p.m.	at Sacramento State	No. 10	Hornet Stadium; Sacramento, CA	KPAX	L 28–42	12,751
October 1	1:05 p.m.	Northern Colorado^{†}	No. 19	Washington–Grizzly Stadium; Missoula, MT	KPAX	W 55–28	25,919
October 8	4:05 p.m.	at Idaho State	No. 16	Holt Arena; Pocatello, ID	KPAX	W 33–0	9,124
October 15	1:05 p.m.	Portland State	No. 14	Washington–Grizzly Stadium; Missoula, MT	KPAX	W 30–24	25,744
October 22	3:05 p.m.	at Northern Arizona	No. 12	Walkup Skydome; Flagstaff, AZ	KPAX	W 28–24	8,421
October 29	1:00 p.m.	Weber State	No. 11	Washington–Grizzly Stadium; Missoula, MT	KPAX	W 45–10 (vacated)	25,401
November 5	12:05 p.m.	Western Oregon*	No. 10	Washington–Grizzly Stadium; Missoula, MT	KWBM	W 32–7 (vacated)	24,984
November 19	12:05 p.m.	at No. 1 Montana State	No. 7	Bobcat Stadium; Bozeman, MT (Brawl of the Wild)	KPAX	W 36–10 (vacated)	20,247
December 3	1:00 pm	No. 15 Central Arkansas*	No. 5	Washington–Grizzly Stadium; Missoula, MT (FCS Playoffs Second Round)	ESPN3	W 41–14 (vacated)	22,005
December 10	7:05 pm	No. 2 Northern Iowa*	No. 5	Washington–Grizzly Stadium; Missoula, MT (FCS Playoffs Quarterfinals)	ESPN	W 48–10 (vacated)	23,049
December 16	7:00 pm	at No. 1 Sam Houston State*	No. 5	Bowers Stadium; Huntsville, TX (FCS Playoffs Semifinals)	ESPN	L 28–31	12,367
*Non-conference game; ^{†}Homecoming; Rankings from The Sports Network Poll released prior to the game

== Regular season ==
Final score source

=== Tennessee ===
	1	2	3	4	Total
#12 Montana	0	7	2	7	16
Tennessee	14	14	7	7	42

=== Cal Poly ===
	1	2	3	4	Total
Cal Poly	10	7	6	0	23
#15 Montana	7	7	15	8	37

=== Eastern Washington ===
	1	2	3	4	Total
#10 Eastern Washington	0	6	0	8	14
#12 Montana	10	0	7	0	17

=== Sacramento State ===
	1	2	3	4	Total
#10 Montana	7	7	7	7	28
Sacramento State	7	14	14	7	42

=== Northern Colorado ===
	1	2	3	4	Total
Northern Colorado	7	7	0	14	28
#19 Montana	10	17	28	0	55

=== Idaho State ===
	1	2	3	4	Total
#16 Montana	10	3	10	10	33
Idaho State	0	0	0	0	0

=== Portland State ===
	1	2	3	4	Total
Portland State	6	15	3	0	24
#14 Montana	0	10	14	6	30

=== Northern Arizona ===
	1	2	3	4	Total
#12 Montana	0	14	7	7	28
Northern Arizona	14	0	0	10	24

=== Weber State* ===
	1	2	3	4	Total
Weber State	3	0	0	7	10
#11 Montana	14	24	7	0	45

=== Western Oregon* ===
	1	2	3	4	Total
Western Oregon	0	0	7	0	7
#10 Montana	6	6	10	10	32

=== Montana State* ===
	1	2	3	4	Total
#7 Montana	0	12	17	7	36
#1 Montana State	0	0	7	3	10

- On July 26, 2013, the NCAA sanctioned Montana and forced it to vacate its last five wins of the 2011 season, Big Sky Conference co-championship and NCAA FCS playoff participation.

== FCS Playoffs ==
=== Second Round–Central Arkansas* ===
	1	2	3	4	Total
#15 Central Arkansas	0	0	7	7	14
#5 Montana	17	14	7	3	41

=== Quarterfinals–Northern Iowa* ===
	1	2	3	4	Total
#2 Northern Iowa	7	3	0	0	10
#5 Montana	7	21	7	13	48

=== Semifinals–Sam Houston State ===
	1	2	3	4	Total
#5 Montana	0	14	7	7	28
#1 Sam Houston State	21	7	3	0	31

- On July 26, 2013, the NCAA sanctioned Montana and forced it to vacate its last five wins of the 2011 season, Big Sky Conference co-championship and NCAA FCS playoff participation.

== Rankings ==
Ranking movements Legend: ██ Increase in ranking ██ Decrease in ranking
	Week													
Poll	Pre	1	2	3	4	5	6	7	8	9	10	11	12	Final
The Sports Network	12	15	12	10	19	16	14	12	11	10	8	7	5	
FCS Coaches	12	13	11	9	16	14	11	9	8	8	7	7	5	

== NCAA investigation and sanctions ==
In 2013, the NCAA investigated the University of Montana for violations of regulations concerning gifts to student athletes. On July 26, 2013, the NCAA announced its finding that the university had insufficiently monitored its football program, enabling boosters to provide gifts and services to players against NCAA regulations.

Much of the investigation centered on events surrounding the arrests of two Montana football players, cornerback Trumaine Johnson and backup quarterback Gerald Kemp, in October 2011. The NCAA found that boosters provided the players with bail and free legal counsel, in violation of NCAA rules. Several university personnel, including then-coach Robin Pflugrad, then-athletics director Jim O’Day, and the university compliance officer, evidently knew details of the situation but did not report them. The investigation also found that six boosters had provided smaller benefits to players over 100 times between 2004 and 2012.

Montana faced several penalties as a result of the investigation, most of which it self-imposed. Montana vacated five wins from the 2011 season in which Johnson and Kemp had played, including a win in the rivalry game against Montana State and two FCS playoff victories, vacating the school's participation in the FCS playoffs. Montana was also subjected to a probationary period and lost four scholarships in each of those years.
