= 2010 North Dakota Fighting Sioux football team =

American college football season

2010 North Dakota Fighting Sioux football
- Conference: Great West Conference
- Record: 3–8 (0–4 GWC)
- Head coach: Chris Mussman (3rd season)
- Offensive coordinator: Greg Breitbach (3rd season)
- Co-defensive coordinators: John Kelling (5th season); Mike Mannausau (5th season)
- Home stadium: Alerus Center

2010 Great West Conference football standings
	Conf.			Overall
Team	W		L	W		L
Southern Utah $	4	–	0	6	–	5
UC Davis	3	–	1	6	–	5
No. 24 Cal Poly	2	–	2	7	–	4
South Dakota	1	–	3	4	–	7
North Dakota	0	–	4	3	–	8
$ – Conference champion; Rankings from The Sports Network poll

The 2010 North Dakota Fighting Sioux football team represented the University of North Dakota as a member of the Great West Conference (GWC) during the 2010 NCAA Division I FCS football season. Led by third-year head coach Chris Mussman, the Fighting Sioux compiled an overall record of 3–8 with a mark of 0–4 in conference play, placing last out of five teams in the GWC. The team home games at the Alerus Center in Grand Forks, North Dakota.

== Schedule ==
Date	Time	Opponent	Site	TV	Result	Attendance	Source
September 2	8:00 pm	at Idaho*	Kibbie Dome; Moscow, ID		L 0–45	11,466	
September 11	6:00 pm	at Northern Illinois*	Huskie Stadium; DeKalb, IL		L 17–23	18,046	
September 18	4:00 pm	Northeastern State*	Alerus Center; Grand Forks, ND		W 55–14	9,719	
September 25	4:00 pm	Northwestern State*	Alerus Center; Grand Forks, ND	KSHV, Fox College Sports	W 49–24	7,966	
October 2	2:00 pm	at South Dakota	DakotaDome; Vermillion, SD (Sitting Bull Trophy)		L 17–27	9,596	
October 9	4:00 pm	Southern Utah^{†}	Alerus Center; Grand Forks, ND		L 21–31	10,215	
October 23	8:05 pm	at No. 23 Cal Poly	Alex G. Spanos Stadium; San Luis Obispo, CA		L 21–22	10,220	
October 30	12:00 pm	Lamar*	Alerus Center; Grand Forks, ND		W 31–6	6,238	
November 6	12:00 pm	UC Davis	Alerus Center; Grand Forks, ND		L 16–35	6,633	
November 13	1:00 pm	at No. 17 Montana*	Washington–Grizzly Stadium; Missoula, MT	KPAX	L 17–27	24,151	
November 20	1:00 pm	at South Dakota State*	Dana J. Dykhouse Stadium; Brookings, SD		L 0–21	3,918	
*Non-conference game; ^{†}Homecoming; Rankings from The Sports Network Poll released prior to the game; All times are in Central time
