= 2010 Cal Poly Mustangs football team =

American college football season

2010 Cal Poly Mustangs football
- Conference: Great West Conference
- Record: 7–4 (2–2 GWC)
- Head coach: Tim Walsh (2nd season)
- Co-offensive coordinators: Brian Cook (2nd season); Saga Tuitele (2nd season)
- Offensive scheme: Triple option
- Defensive coordinator: Greg Lupfer (2nd season)
- Base defense: 3–4
- Home stadium: Alex G. Spanos Stadium

2010 Great West Conference football standings
	Conf.			Overall
Team	W		L	W		L
Southern Utah $	4	–	0	6	–	5
UC Davis	3	–	1	6	–	5
No. 24 Cal Poly	2	–	2	7	–	4
South Dakota	1	–	3	4	–	7
North Dakota	0	–	4	3	–	8
$ – Conference champion; Rankings from The Sports Network poll

The 2010 Cal Poly Mustangs football team represented California Polytechnic State University, San Luis Obispo as member of the Great West Conference (GWC) during the 2010 NCAA Division I FCS football season. Led by second-year head coach Tim Walsh, Cal Poly compiled an overall record of 7–4 with a mark of 2–2 in conference play, placing third in the GWC. The Mustangs played home games at Alex G. Spanos Stadium in San Luis Obispo, California.

== Schedule ==
Date	Time	Opponent	Rank	Site	Result	Attendance
September 4	6:05 pm	Humboldt State*^{†}	No. 25	Alex G. Spanos Stadium; San Luis Obispo, CA	W 23–17	7,345
September 11	6:05 pm	No. 1 Montana*	No. 18	Alex G. Spanos Stadium; San Luis Obispo, CA	W 35–33	8,027
September 18	4:00 pm	at Texas State*	No. 17	Bobcat Stadium; San Marcos, TX	L 12–21	12,236
September 25	5:00 pm	at No. 17 McNeese State*	No. 22	Cowboy Stadium; Lake Charles, LA	W 40–14	11,958
October 2	7:00 pm	at Fresno State*	No. 14	Bulldog Stadium; Fresno, CA	L 17–38	37,069
October 9	3:00 pm	at Old Dominion*	No. 16	Foreman Field; Norfolk, VA	W 50–37	19,782
October 16	2:00 pm	at Southern Utah	No. 13	Eccles Coliseum; Cedar City, UT	L 7–20	8,219
October 23	6:05 pm	North Dakota	No. 23	Alex G. Spanos Stadium; San Luis Obispo, CA	W 22–21	10,220
October 30	6:05 pm	St. Francis (PA)*	No. 20	Alex G. Spanos Stadium; San Luis Obispo, CA	W 41–33	7,132
November 6	2:05 pm	at South Dakota	No. 18	DakotaDome; Vermillion, SD	W 38–24	7,369
November 13	6:05 pm	UC Davis	No. 18	Alex G. Spanos Stadium; San Luis Obispo, CA (Battle for the Golden Horseshoe)	L 21–22	11,075
*Non-conference game; ^{†}Homecoming; Rankings from The Sports Network Poll released prior to the game; All times are in Pacific time

== Game summaries ==
	1	2	3	4	Total
Lumberjacks	7	10	0	0	17
#25 Mustangs	0	7	14	2	23

	1	2	3	4	Total
#1 Grizzlies	14	0	6	13	33
Mustangs	7	7	14	7	35

	1	2	3	4	Total
#18 Mustangs	3	0	9	0	12
Cowboys	7	0	7	7	21

	1	2	3	4	Total
Mustangs	3	21	16	0	40
Cowboys	0	7	0	7	14

Fresno State outscored Cal Poly 17-0 in the second half in the first meeting between the two rivals since 1985. Bulldogs go to 8-0 vs. FCS/1-AA teams under Pat Hill.

	1	2	3	4	Total
Mustangs	3	14	0	0	17
Bulldogs	14	7	10	7	38

	1	2	3	4	Total
Mustangs	17	10	0	23	50
Monarchs	7	13	0	17	37

	1	2	3	4	Total
Mustangs					0
Thunderbirds					0

	1	2	3	4	Total
Mustangs					0
Sioux					0

	1	2	3	4	Total
Red Flash	6	6	7	14	33
Mustangs	7	6	14	14	41

	1	2	3	4	Total
Mustangs					0
Coyotes					0

	1	2	3	4	Total
Aggies					0
Mustangs					0
