= Brandon Kaufman =

American former football player (born 1990)

Profile
- Position: Wide receiver

Personal information
- Born: October 26, 1990 (age 36); Denver, Colorado, U.S.
- Listed height: 6 ft 5 in (1.96 m)
- Listed weight: 235 lb (107 kg)

Career information
- High school: Heritage (Littleton, Colorado)
- College: Eastern Washington
- NFL draft: 2013: undrafted

Career history
- Buffalo Bills (2013–2014)*; BC Lions (2014)*
- * Offseason or practice squad member only

Awards and highlights
- FCS national champion (2010); College Football Performance Awards FCS Wide Receiver Award (2012); 2012 FCS Second-team All-American (AP, TSN); 2× First-team All-Big Sky Conference (2012, 2010); NCAA Division I FCS single-season receiving yards record (2012)
- Stats at Pro Football Reference

Brandon Kaufman (born October 26, 1990) is an American former football player. He also played Australian rules football.

Kaufman played college football for three years with the Eastern Washington Eagles. In 2010, as a sophomore he had 15 touchdowns, the second-most in school history, to help lead the school to the 2010 NCAA Division I Football Championship Subdivision National Championship. In 2012, he set the FCS single-season receiving yards record, recording 93 receptions for 1,850 yards and 16 touchdowns. He was a two-time Football Championship Subdivision All-American.

He declared early for the 2013 NFL draft. He signed with the Buffalo Bills as a free agent on April 29, 2013.

== Early life and prep career ==
Kaufman is Jewish, the son of Steve and Rhonda Kaufman. He was born in Denver, Colorado.

Kaufman attended Heritage High School in Littleton, Colorado, graduating in 2009. He competed in track, running 100 meters in 10.8 seconds. He also played basketball for the school, averaging over 13 points a game in 2007. He made a highlight reel play his senior season, running away from the basket while falling out of bounds, shooting it one handed from approximately 35 feet and making the three point basket.

Playing football for the high school, he was one of the top receivers in Colorado, as he caught 97 passes for 1,918 yards (averaging 20 yards a catch) and 16 touchdowns as a sophomore and junior. Kaufman earned honorable mention All-State honors in football as a junior and twice was selected to the All-Continental League team. He missed his senior season with a torn ACL knee injury suffered during a summer camp before the 2008 season began. Throughout high school, Brandon was known to make highlight reel catches on a regular basis. In practice, he was known to only use one hand during wide receiver drills.

== College career ==
=== 2009–10 ===
Because he had been injured in his senior year of high school, all schools other than Eastern Washington University withdrew their offers. Kaufman played as a true freshman in 2009 for the Eastern Washington Eagles, a Football Championship Subdivision school (formerly Division I-AA), seeing action in nine games, including five as a starter. Kaufman finished the year with 23 catches for 294 yards and 1 touchdown. Kaufman was also named to the Big Sky Conference All-Academic Team.

Kaufman helped lead Eastern Washington to the 2010 NCAA Division I FCS National Championship as a sophomore, recording 76 catches (5th-most in school history) for 1,214 yards (also fifth-best in EWU history) and 15 touchdowns (second-best in school history) as he started all 15 games.

Kaufman capped off his break-out season with 9 catches for 120 yards in the Championship game against Delaware. With under two minutes left in the 3rd quarter, and with Eastern Washington down 19–0, he caught the first of his two touchdowns helping to spark a rally culminating with his game-winning second touchdown. The final score was 20–19, earning Eastern Washington its first football National Championship.

Kaufman was named to the First-team All-Big Sky Conference, and named to the College Sporting News “Sweet 63” All-America Team and the Phil Steele Publications All-America fourth team, and for the second season to the Big Sky Conference All-Academic team. He was also chosen as the NCAA Championship Subdivision Playoffs MVP by College Sporting News. Academically, as of December 2010 he had a 3.57 cumulative grade point average.

=== 2011 ===
Before the 2011 season began, he was named to the 28-member Athlon College Football Preview preseason All-America team, a pre-season First-team All-American by Phil Steele’s FCS College Football Preview, one of the top 10 wide receivers in FCS by The Sports Network, one of the top 38 receivers by the College Football Performance Awards, All-Big Sky Conference, and first-team All-BSC by Phil Steele. However, four games into the season he broke a metacarpal in his left hand against Montana State in September. Kaufman had caught 29 passes for 373 yards at that point. He then redshirted in 2011, as an injury hardship case.

=== 2012 ===
Before the 2012 season began, he was named a preseason third-team All-American by The Sports Network and AnyGivenSaturday.com, chosen as ont of the top 10 FCS wide receivers by The Sports Network, chosen as the # 6 FCS wide receiver by Phil Steele’s FCS College Football Preview, named preseason All-Big Sky Conference, and listed by Phil Steele as a second-team preseason All-Big Sky selection. In 2012, Kaufman set the FCS single-season receiving yards record, recording 93 receptions for 1,850 yards and 16 touchdowns while leading the Eagles to a semifinal appearance in the 2012 FCS Playoffs.

Describing his mentality on the field, Kaufman said:

You have to think you’re better than the other person, and trust what you’re doing all week and all year, studying film and what you’re working on in practice. If you do it right, you’ve beaten your guy already all through the week.

=== Records and awards ===
In his college career, he caught 221 passes (3rd in EWU history; 7th in Big Sky history) for 3,731 yards (2nd all-time at EWU, 4th in the Big Sky; 16.9 per catch) and 33 touchdowns (2nd in school history) as he started 37 games.

He was named to the Jewish Sports Review 2012 College Football All-America Team. For his career, he was a two-time Football Championship Subdivision All-American.

== NFL career ==
Pre-draft measurables
Height	Weight	40-yard dash	10-yard split	20-yard shuttle	Three-cone drill	Vertical jump
6 ft 5 in (1.96 m)	216 lb (98 kg)	4.57 s	1.59 s	4.59 s	6.83 s	35.5 in (0.90 m)
All values from Eastern Washington Pro Day

=== 2013 NFL draft ===
On January 9, 2013, local TV station KREM announced that Kaufman would forgo his final season of eligibility at Eastern Washington, and declared for the 2013 NFL draft. He was 20 credits short of a degree and continued his studies online.

At an NFL Scouting Combine in Indianapolis in February 2013, he was tested and underwent multiple physicals. At an NFL Scouting Combine in Cheney, Washington, on March 6, 2013, he tested before 18 National Football League scouts at EWU’s annual Pro Day. He had a 68.0 grade (50–69 grades are for those deemed to be a "Draftable Player"; the next higher grades of 70–84 are for "Eventual Starter"), ranking him 18th among 38 wide receivers. He was the second-tallest (6-foot-5) and seventh-biggest (216 pounds) receiver at the combine and had a vertical jump of 33 1/2 inches.

Rob Rang of The Sports Xchange called him a potential fifth- to sixth-round pick. NFLDraftScout.com projected him being picked in the seventh round. John Harris of Yahoo! Sports projected that he might be taken by the New York Giants in the 7th round, saying he "has great size and will catch the football going across the middle".

Kaufman went undrafted in the 2013 NFL draft but soon signed with the Buffalo Bills as a free agent on April 29, 2013.

=== 2013 NFL season ===
Kaufman went a perfect six for six, catching all balls thrown to him in the preseason, including one touchdown. (One catch was called back for offensive line holding). His biggest highlight came on his first official catch, against the Colts in game one. The Colts’ sideline read the play before the snap and called in from the sideline to their cornerback that Kaufman was going to run a double-move go route. Despite the advance warning allowing the defender to be in perfect position, Kaufman was still able to pull down the circus catch and get both feet in-bounds. Kaufman consistently was able to get open throughout the preseason, despite very few throws being made overall in the last game in which he saw the most field-time. The Bills released Kaufman on August 30, 2013. The Bills signed Kaufman to their practice squad on December 10, 2013.

== Australian football career ==
Kaufman was recruited and signed by the Gold Coast Suns in 2016 to play for their reserves team in the North East Australian Football League. Kaufman is one of a few Americans to be recruited for the AFL.

On April 24, 2016, Kaufman played his first game of Australian Rules Football for the Labrador Tigers reserves. Upon return to the US, he played two seasons with the Denver Bulldogs of the United States Australian Football League and was in consideration for the USA Revolution National Team scheduled to compete at the 2020 Australian Football International Cup before it was cancelled due to the COVID-19 pandemic.

== See also ==
- List of select Jewish football players
