= Roos Field =

Outdoor college football stadium in the northwest United States

Coordinates: 47.493°N 117.588°W

- "The Inferno"
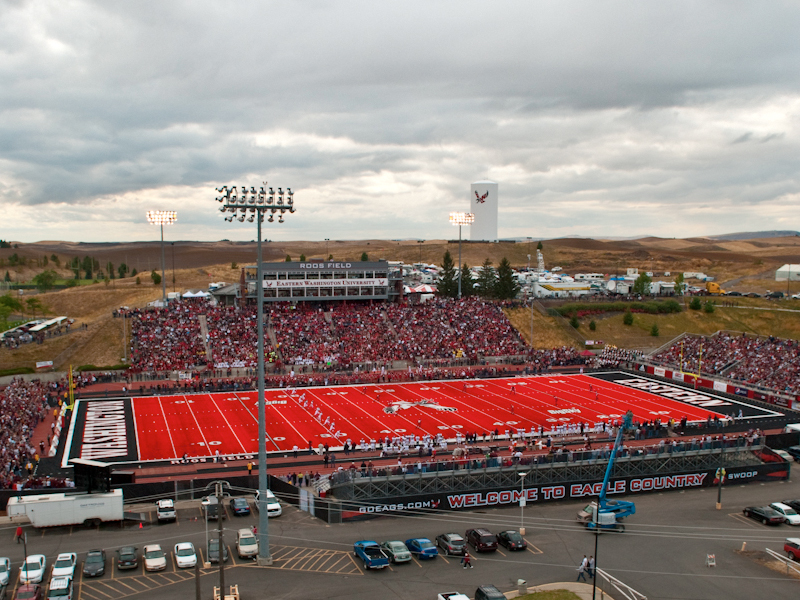
- Debut of red field in 2010

- Location within the United States Location within Washington (state)
- Interactive map of Roos Field
- Former names: Woodward Field (1967–2009)
- Address: 1136 Washington Street
- Location: Eastern Washington University; Cheney, Washington, U.S.
- Elevation: 2,470 feet (755 m) AMSL
- Owner: Eastern Washington University
- Operator: Eastern Washington University
- Capacity: 8,600 (2004–present); 7,500 (1967–2003)
- Surface: AstroTurf 3D3 (red) (2020–); SprinTurf (red) (2010–2020); Natural grass (1967–2009)
- Record attendance: 11,702 (September 18, 2010)

Construction
- Groundbreaking: 1966
- Opened: 1967, 59 years ago
- Cost: $1.5 million ($14.5 million in 2025)
- Architect: T.W. Clark Construction LLC

Tenant
- Eastern Washington Eagles (1967–present)

Roos Field is an outdoor college football stadium in the northwest United States, on the campus of Eastern Washington University in Cheney, Washington, southwest of Spokane. It is the home venue of the Eastern Washington Eagles of the Big Sky Conference in Division I (FCS).

Opened 59 years ago in 1967, the Eagles have accomplished a 112–51 (.687) record at home. The seating capacity was increased in 2004 to its current capacity of 8,700 permanent seats. Additional temporary seating is often utilized to accommodate large crowds, which brings the capacity to nearly 12,000.

== Naming history ==
The stadium was originally named Woodward Field in honor of former Eagles head football and basketball coach Arthur C. Woodward. It replaced the original Woodward Field, which was located near the present JFK Library.

The field was renamed before the start of the 2010 season in honor of Michael Roos, an All-Pro NFL tackle and former Eastern Washington football player, and major donor for the Red Turf project.

== 2004 renovation ==
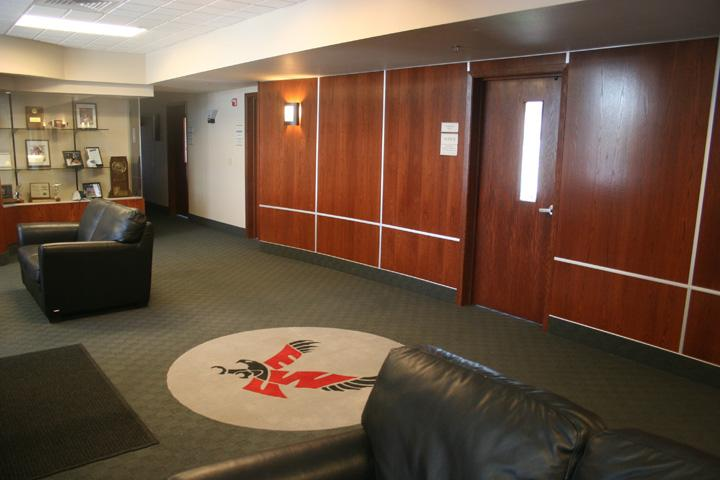
Suites in the new press box

Roos Field went under a massive renovation in 2004 that upgraded public facilities, the press box, new locker room, and also updated the stadium's capacity.

The suites and media center represent phase two of a three-phase $4.5 million stadium upgrade. Phase one consisted of a $350,000 renovation of the stadium's entrance and ticket office. Completed in 2002, the project was funded with state dollars. Phase three increased the stadium's permanent seating capacity from 7,500 to 8,700 and was financed with a combination of public funds and private donations.

"Our ability to bring prospective donors and entertain them is important," says Scott Barnes. "It will create a revenue stream for us over time. It's also an important piece in the recruiting process." Barnes says EWU will market the suites to donors, who will pay $30,000 to lease them for five years. The project called for a two-level 6,800-square-foot (630 m^{2}) structure to replace the existing about 800-square-foot (74 m^{2}) press box with the enclosed suites and a new press box on the west side of the stadium. The first floor of the elevated structure contains the donor suites and the second level is for the media and coaches. Each of the donor suites has 12 seats and room for additional people. The suites also have cable television, stereos, and refrigerators.

== Attendance ==
In 2010, a record 11,702 fans watched the Eagles defeat Montana 36–27 on September 18, in the first game played on EWU's signature red turf dubbed the "Inferno."

Eastern set its single season attendance record in 2011 with an average of 8,889 and currently ranks 48th in FCS and fourth in the Big Sky Conference. Roos Field's capacity is expanded by 2,000 by adding bleachers when it hosts Montana.

== Red turf ==
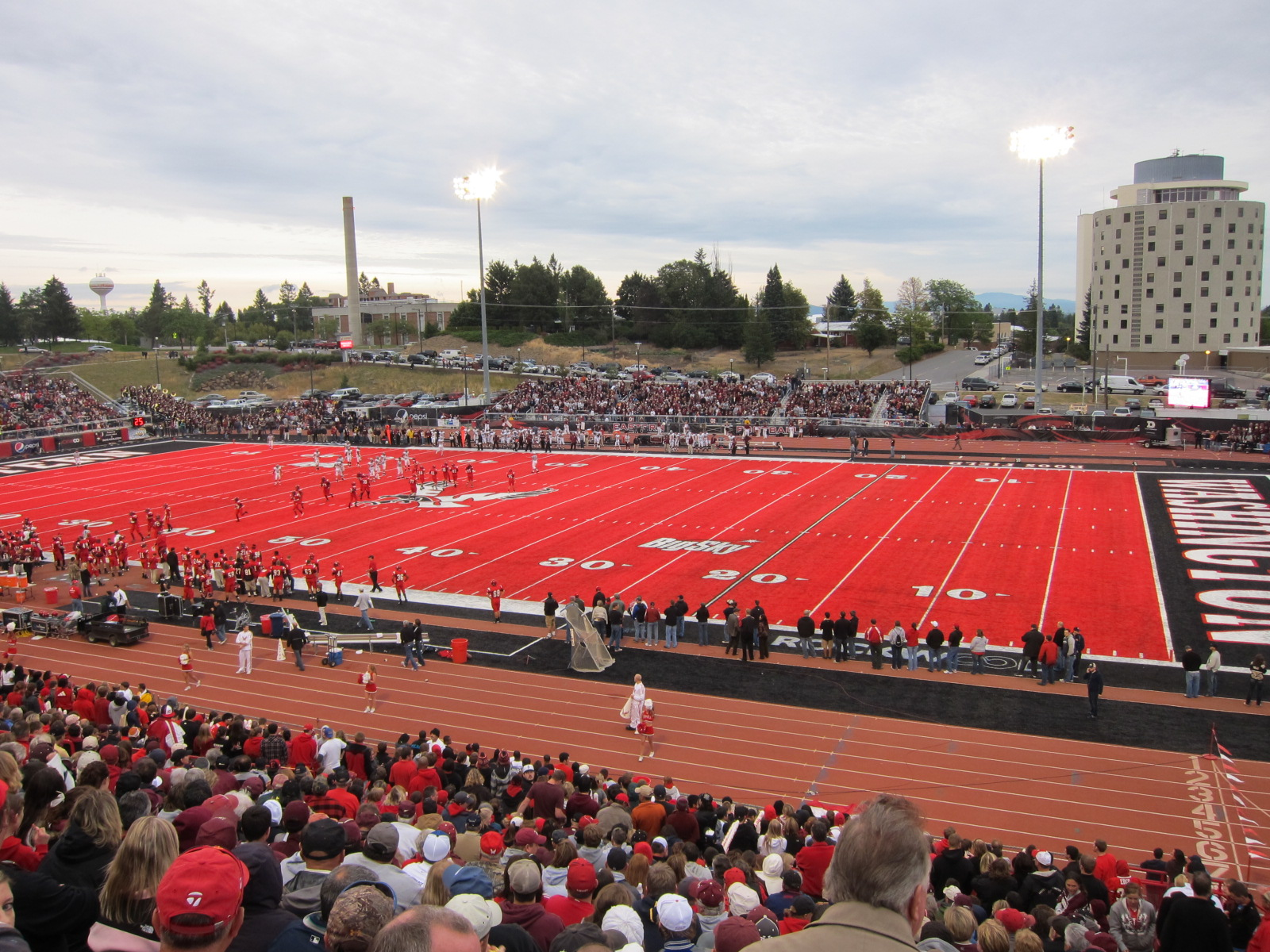
Sold out Roos Field in 2010

On February 26, 2010, ESPN reported that Eastern Washington planned to remove the natural turf at Woodward Field and replace it with red SprinTurf, making it the second Division I college football program to have a non-green playing surface (Boise State of the MWC has had a blue surface since 1986).

A funding drive was begun in late January 2010, with EWU alumnus Michael Roos donating $500,000 toward the installation costs, and fellow alumnus and Fox Sports personality Colin Cowherd also making a donation. On May 20, the Eastern Washington Board of Trustees approved a name change to Roos Field upon the successful completion of the project.

The field is aligned nearly north–south, offset slightly to the northwest, at an approximate elevation of 2,450 feet (745 m) above sea level.

== Future upgrades at Roos Field ==
=== Video scoreboard ===
In June 2012, it was announced that a state-of-the-art video scoreboard would be installed in time for the first home game of the 2012 season on September 29. The project will be financed by the EWU Foundation and will not include any taxpayer or non-designated donor dollars. The primary source of funding will come from advertising revenue generated from the scoreboards, which will also produce revenue for scholarships.

=== Gateway Project ===
In April 2012, the "Gateway Project", was proposed to the EWU Board of Trustees. The proposal included among other things, adding 5,000 additional seats in lower seating, rather than bleachers, on the Washington Street side of Roos Field, plus 3,000 covered seats (for a final overall total of 15,000 seats) in an upper area a concession areas with a view of the football field, suites and a donor club with tiered seating and a patio, an Academic Success facility for athletes, a training room and a football operations office with locker rooms for home and visiting teams, a new university bookstore and leasable commercial space.

A feasibility study is currently underway that would identify revenue streams and measure costs, which have been estimated to be $20 million or more. No time frame has been set for the start of the project as of July, 2012.

In November 2012, it was announced that the project envisions adding several thousand seats at Roos Field, boosting capacity beyond 18,000. Other amenities include athletic facilities, band locker rooms, offices, and retail space. The latter is expected to generate revenue once the project becomes a reality. The project is now estimated to cost $60 million to $70 million.

== See also ==
- List of NCAA Division I FCS football stadiums
- List of college football stadiums with non-traditional field colors
