= NBC Sports Northwest =

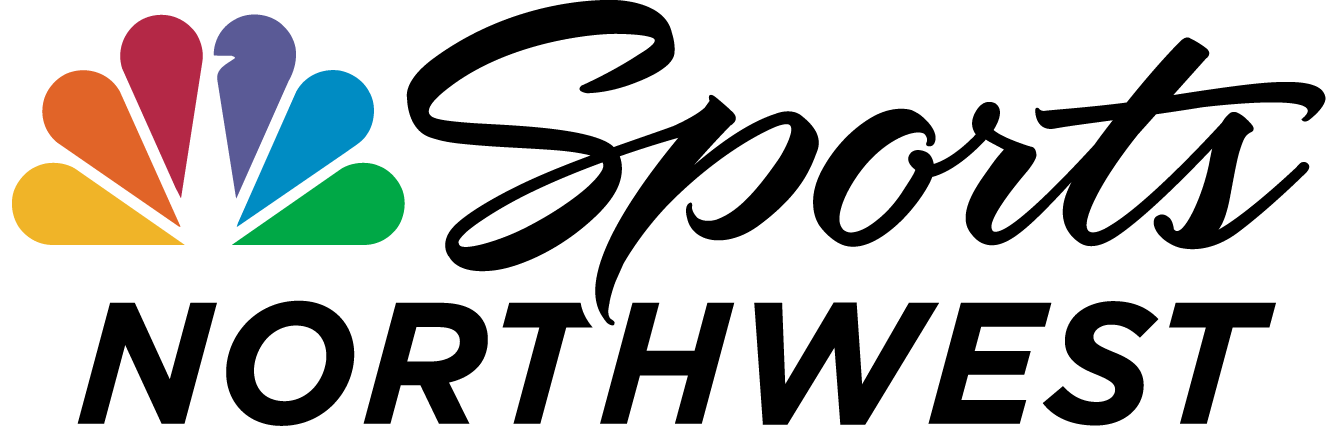
- The networks final logo, used from October 2017 to September 2021
- Country: United States
- Broadcast area: Oregon; Washington
- Network: NBC Sports Regional Networks
- Headquarters: Portland, Oregon

Programming
- Language: English
- Picture format: 1080i (HDTV); 480i (SDTV)

Ownership
- Owner: NBC Sports Group

History
- Launched: November 1, 2007
- Closed: September 30, 2021
- Former names: Comcast SportsNet Northwest (2007–2016); CSN Northwest (2016–2017)

NBC Sports Northwest (originally Comcast SportsNet Northwest) was an American regional sports network owned by the NBC Sports Group unit of NBCUniversal, as an affiliate of NBC Sports Regional Networks. The network broadcast regional coverage of professional sports events throughout the Pacific Northwest, focusing primarily on the NBA's Portland Trail Blazers and college sports events involving the Oregon Ducks. It also covered other sports events involving teams within the northwestern United States, including those featuring college and high school teams.

The network was available on cable providers throughout Oregon and Washington. The network maintained business offices, master control operations and studio facilities located in Portland; NBC Sports Northwest maintained a secondary studio in the Moda Center used for Trail Blazers game coverage.

The network shut down at the end of the broadcast day on September 30, 2021.

== History ==
After the Trail Blazers dismantled their pay-per-view network BlazerVision in 2001, the team reached a broadcast deal with FSN Northwest, where the team's game telecasts aired until the 2006–07 season. Fox Sports Networks did not renew its contract with the Blazers at the conclusion of the 2006–07 season; as a result, Comcast formed a new regional sports network, Comcast SportsNet Northwest, to assume the broadcast rights to the team. The network launched on November 1, 2007, coinciding with the start of the 2007–08 Trail Blazers regular season.

CSN Northwest logo from 2016 to October 2017

With Comcast's acquisition of NBCUniversal in 2011, Comcast SportsNet was also integrated into the new NBC Sports Group unit, culminating with the addition of the peacock logo and an updated graphics package to mirror that of its parent network. The updated graphics were implemented on CSN's live game coverage and all studio shows; SportsNet Central was an exception to this initially, but would ultimately implement a new on-air look of its own and on April 14, 2014, in conjunction with that change, the program switched to the updated graphics package introduced three years earlier.

Comcast SportsNet Northwest became CSN Northwest in 2016. On October 2, 2017, CSN Northwest was renamed as NBC Sports Northwest, as part of a larger rebranding of the Comcast SportsNet networks under the NBC Sports brand.

After it was announced that the Trail Blazers would leave NBC Sports Northwest for Root Sports Northwest, the network announced it would cease operations on September 30, 2021. A key factor in the Trail Blazers decision to leave the network was its failure to gain widespread distribution. After nearly 15 years, NBC Sports Northwest only had distribution to about 1.1 million homes, only had scattered coverage on streaming services, and never found DirecTV or Dish coverage. Its distribution is dwarfed by the nearly 2 million homes where Root Sports is available. The Trail Blazers will continue to produce their own games when they move to Root Sports.

== Programming ==
=== Portland Trail Blazers ===
NBC Sports Northwest held the exclusive regional television rights to the Portland Trail Blazers, carrying the majority of the NBA franchise's regular season, pre-season and early-round playoff games; the network also produced expanded pre-game and post-game analysis (under the Rip City Live and Talking Ball banners), along with select NBA Summer League games and season team previews. However, the team produced the actual telecasts in-house and utilized their own graphics team, departing completely from the standard NBC Sports design language. During the network's inaugural season in 2007–08, Comcast SportsNet Northwest carried at least 55 Trail Blazers regular season games. Combined with the Trail Blazers' over-the-air coverage, 81 of the team's regular season games that year were shown on television, the largest number of telecasts in the team's history. The new network aired 28 of the team's 36 home game telecasts in high definition. Some games were previously syndicated to over-the-air stations in the team's designated market region.

On July 6, 2016, the team extended its contract through the 2020–2021 season and made NBC Sports Northwest the exclusive broadcaster of all regional Trail Blazers games beginning in the 2017–18 season.

Since the 2008–09 season, due to the Seattle SuperSonics' relocation to Oklahoma City, Oklahoma, in 2008 to become the Oklahoma City Thunder, Trail Blazers games are also available in the Seattle region.

In March 2021, reports surfaced that the Trail Blazers would leave NBC Sports Northwest in favor of returning to Root Sports, which would leave the network's future uncertain. On June 9, 2021, the Trail Blazers confirmed that they would be returning to Root Sports Northwest.

=== University of Oregon Ducks ===
The Oregon Sports Network (OSN) – a sports syndication service operated by the University of Oregon to broadcast Oregon Ducks events – was seeking to expand its coverage and availability, and negotiated a contract with Comcast SportsNet Northwest around the time of its launch to air many of the university's football and basketball games that were not scheduled to broadcast on a national network or on FSN. In 2008, Comcast SportsNet Northwest became the primary broadcaster of OSN-produced telecasts, with the games being simulcast on Fox affiliate KLSR-TV (channel 34) in Eugene. Coverage of Oregon sports events declined after the launch of the Pac-12 Networks in September 2012, and by 2015 its only Ducks coverage was the weekly sports rundown Talking Ducks.

=== Other sports events ===
NBC Sports Northwest also provided coverage of a variety of other regional sports events. The network broadcast NHL games involving the Vancouver Canucks, carrying 25 games per season via a simulcast with Sportsnet Pacific. Through its relationships with other Comcast-owned channels, NBC Sports Northwest also broadcast 35 regular-season games from various other NHL teams. In 2011, Comcast SportsNet Northwest announced that it would provide a reduced schedule of NHL coverage focusing solely on the Vancouver Canucks and San Jose Sharks; the network announced later that year that it would no longer carry any Sharks telecasts. Additionally, the network also carried select home games from the Portland Winterhawks Western Hockey League franchise.

In April 2009, Comcast SportsNet Northwest began carrying select regular season games from the Tacoma Rainiers of the Pacific Coast League, using the team's radio network and announcer Mike Curto for play-by-play. On March 12, 2014, the network announced that it would carry all but one home game from the Portland Thunder during the Arena Football League team's inaugural season.

=== Other programming ===
The network produced SportsNet Central, a daily morning news program providing game highlights and sports headlines. Additional content was available through the network's website and apps. Along with the network's Trail Blazers game coverage, the network also aired a number of other NBA-related specials focused on the NBA draft, NBA All-Star Game and the NBA playoffs.

NBC Sports Northwest also aired video simulcasts of three weekday sports radio programs: it carried the Chuck Powell Show KJR (950 AM) talk program from Seattle live each weekday from 10:00 a.m. to 1:00 p.m., and The FAN from KFXX (1080 AM) in Portland from 3:00 to 6:00 p.m.

== Availability ==
NBC Sports Northwest was available on Comcast (in Oregon and Washington), Ashland TV, Beaver Creek Telcom, BendBroadband, Canby Telcom, Charter Communications (in Oregon and Washington), Country Cablevision, Frontier Communications (in Oregon and Washington), MINET (in Monmouth, Oregon), Monroe Telephone, Reliance Connects, Scio Cablevision, Frontier FiOS (in the Portland and Seattle markets) and Wave Broadband.

=== Carriage controversies ===
The network was never available on satellite providers DirecTV and Dish Network, due to Comcast's long-time negotiation policies which favored cable over satellite. The move of the Trail Blazers to Root Sports is thought to be due to this conflict, though by coincidence, Dish dropped Root Sports Northwest on the day NBC Sports Northwest was discontinued.

The Consumer Protection Committee of the Oregon House of Representatives held a hearing on February 24, 2010 to attempt to arbitrate a carriage deal between the network, DirecTV, Dish Network and Charter Communications, which also had issues carrying the network. No representatives for DirecTV, Dish Network or the Trail Blazers attended the hearing. On June 21, the Trail Blazers asked the Federal Communications Commission to require Comcast to make the team's games available to competing multichannel video programming distributors such as DirecTV and Dish Network.

Oregon-based cable provider Canby Telcom objected to a non-negotiable subscribe fee increase that would have increased the network's annual subscriber rate to over $32 in 2012; as a result, Canby announced plans to stop carrying Comcast SportsNet Northwest. Keith Galitz, president of Canby Telcom, stated "That's just too steep an increase for us, and it's not in line with inflation or normal escalation of prices in the industry." Canby Telcom has accused Comcast of raising rates way beyond the rate of inflation and industry-wide increases. Clear Creek Television, which carried the Trail Blazers for 15 years, was rebuffed in its attempts to negotiate the above-market rate Comcast was pushing for.

Comcast sent some of its senior staff members to Oregon after a member of the Sports Fan Coalition testified before the Oregon State Legislature on the provider's denial of access to the network on DirecTV, Dish and other cable providers. Brian Frederick, executive director of the advocacy group, stated that "Comcast clearly sees the public perception of its treatment of sports fans as a potential Achilles heel in efforts to acquire NBCU". In a November 7, 2010 article in The Oregonian, Blazers chief executive officer Larry Miller continued to express frustration about the lack of availability for the team's CSN-televised games.

== Related services ==
=== NBC Sports Northwest HD ===
NBC Sports Northwest HD was a 1080i high-definition simulcast feed of NBC Sports Northwest. CSN Northwest broadcast 28 Portland Trail Blazers home games in HD in the 2007–08 season; that number of high-definition game telecasts shown on the network increased to 32 for the 2008–09 season. Former Blazers broadcaster Mike Barrett announced during the network's game telecast against the Los Angeles Clippers on April 13, 2009, that CSN Northwest would broadcast all Trail Blazers games in HD from then onward.

NBC Sports Northwest HD was available on Comcast throughout Oregon and southwestern Washington; Comcast did not carry the high-definition feed in most of the remainder of Washington State (specifically its systems in the Seattle-Tacoma and Spokane markets) until early 2013, when it began to be carried on Channel 617. NBC Sports Northwest HD was only available on Comcast's digital preferred package in western and eastern Washington.
