= Stewart Stadium =

Outdoor multi-purpose stadium in the Western United States

- Location in the United States Location in Utah
- Interactive map of Stewart Stadium
- Full name: Elizabeth Dee Shaw; Stewart Stadium
- Former names: Wildcat Stadium (until 1998)
- Address: 3402 University Circle
- Location: Weber State University; Ogden, Utah, U.S.
- Coordinates: 41°11′31″N 111°56′24″W
- Elevation: 4,760 feet (1,450 m) AMSL
- Owner: Weber State University
- Operator: Weber State University
- Capacity: 13,441
- Surface: synthetic turf natural grass (until 2011)

Construction
- Opened: 1950s 1966 (expanded)

Tenant
- Weber State Wildcats (NCAA) (1966–present)

Elizabeth Dee Shaw Stewart Stadium is an outdoor multi-purpose stadium in the Western United States, located on the campus of Weber State University in Ogden, Utah. Originally Wildcat Stadium, it was renamed in 1998 for Stewart (1905–1996), a notable campus and community benefactor.

Used primarily for football, the 17,312-seat venue is the home of the Weber State Wildcats of the Big Sky Conference. It was expanded in 1966 with the construction of the primary grandstand along the northwest sideline, nearly doubling its capacity. The elevation of its synthetic turf playing field is 4,760 feet (1,450 m) above sea level; aligned northeast to southwest, the field was natural grass until 2011.

Stewart Stadium is also the home venue for Weber State's outdoor track and field teams.

== See also ==
- List of NCAA Division I FCS football stadiums
