= List of Great West Conference football standings =

This is a list of yearly Great West Conference football standings.

== Great West Conference standings ==
2004 Great West Conference football standings
	Conf.			Overall
Team	W		L	W		L
No. 16 Cal Poly $	4	–	1	9	–	2
UC Davis	3	–	2	6	–	4
No. 23 North Dakota State	2	–	3	8	–	3
South Dakota State	2	–	3	6	–	5
Southern Utah	2	–	3	6	–	5
Northern Colorado	2	–	3	2	–	9
$ – Conference champion; Rankings from The Sports Network poll

2005 Great West Conference football standings
	Conf.			Overall
Team	W		L	W		L
No. 6 Cal Poly +^	4	–	1	9	–	4
UC Davis +	4	–	1	6	–	5
North Dakota State	3	–	2	7	–	4
South Dakota State	3	–	2	6	–	5
Southern Utah	1	–	4	1	–	9
Northern Colorado	0	–	5	4	–	7
+ – Conference co-champions; ^ – NCAA Division I-AA playoff participant; Rankings from The Sports Network poll

2006 Great West Conference football standings
	Conf.			Overall
Team	W		L	W		L
No. 5 North Dakota State $	4	–	0	10	–	1
No. 22 South Dakota State	3	–	1	7	–	4
No. 16 Cal Poly	2	–	2	7	–	4
UC Davis	1	–	3	6	–	5
Southern Utah	0	–	4	3	–	8
$ – Conference champion; Rankings from The Sports Network poll

2007 Great West Conference football standings
	Conf.			Overall
Team	W		L	W		L
No. 19 South Dakota State $	4	–	0	7	–	4
No. 9 North Dakota State	3	–	1	10	–	1
No. 24 Cal Poly	2	–	2	7	–	4
UC Davis	1	–	3	5	–	6
Southern Utah	0	–	4	0	–	11
$ – Conference champion; Rankings from The Sports Network poll

2008 Great West Conference football standings
	Conf.			Overall
Team	W		L	W		L
No. 10 Cal Poly $^	3	–	0	8	–	3
UC Davis	2	–	1	5	–	7
North Dakota	1	–	2	6	–	4
South Dakota	1	–	2	6	–	5
Southern Utah	1	–	3	4	–	7
$ – Conference champion; ^ – FCS playoff participant; Rankings from The Sports Network poll

2009 Great West Conference football standings
	Conf.			Overall
Team	W		L	W		L
UC Davis $	3	–	1	6	–	5
North Dakota	2	–	2	6	–	5
South Dakota	2	–	2	5	–	5
Southern Utah	2	–	2	5	–	6
Cal Poly	1	–	3	4	–	7
$ – Conference champion

2010 Great West Conference football standings
	Conf.			Overall
Team	W		L	W		L
Southern Utah $	4	–	0	6	–	5
UC Davis	3	–	1	6	–	5
No. 24 Cal Poly	2	–	2	7	–	4
South Dakota	1	–	3	4	–	7
North Dakota	0	–	4	3	–	8
$ – Conference champion; Rankings from The Sports Network poll

2011 Great West Conference football standings
	Conf.			Overall
Team	W		L	W		L
No. 23 North Dakota +	3	–	1	8	–	3
Cal Poly +	3	–	1	6	–	5
South Dakota	2	–	2	6	–	5
Southern Utah	1	–	3	6	–	5
UC Davis	1	–	3	4	–	7
+ – Conference co-champions; Rankings from The Sports Network poll
