= Inge =

- Gender: Unisex

Other names
- Related names: Inga, Yngvi, Yngve

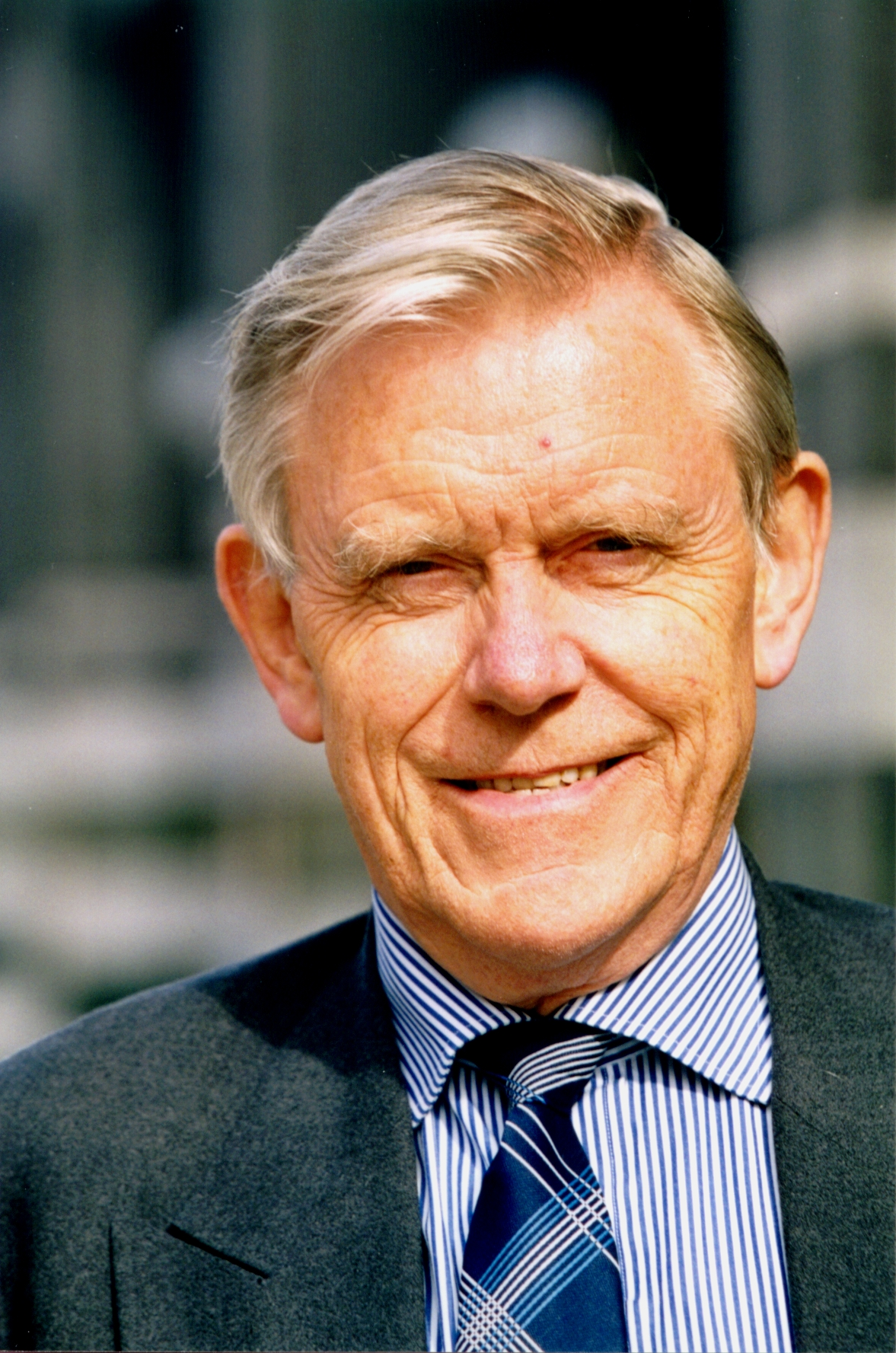
Inge Lønning, Norwegian politician (Conservative Party).

Inge is a given name in various Germanic language-speaking cultures. In Swedish and Norwegian, it is mostly used as a masculine, but less often also as a feminine name. In Danish, Estonian, Frisian, German and Dutch it is exclusively feminine. The feminine name has the variant Inga. In German it is sometimes a short form or nickname of Ingeborg.

The name is in origin a hypocorism of names beginning in the element Ing- (such as Ingar, Inger, Ingrid, Ingeborg, Ingram, Ingvild, Ingunn etc.). These Germanic names made reference to either the god Ing or to the tribe of the Ingvaeones (who were presumably in turn named for the god).

Inge is also encountered as a surname in the English-speaking world; the surname is usually pronounced in England to rhyme with "ring"; alternatively (especially in the United States) some families pronounce it to rhyme with "hinge."

== People called Inge ==
=== Masculine given name ===
==== Scandinavian royalty ====
- Inge the Elder (died c. 1110)
- Inge the Younger, king of Sweden c. 1110–1125
- Inge I of Norway (died 1161)
- Inge Magnusson (died 1202), pretender to the Norwegian throne
- Inge II of Norway (died 1217)

==== Modern ====
- Inge Bell, (born 1967), German journalist, human rights activist, business consultant and entrepreneur.
- Inge Danielsson (1941–2021), Swedish footballer
- Inge Edler (1911–2001), Swedish cardiologist
- Inge Ejderstedt (born 1946), Swedish footballer
- Inge Hammarström (born 1948), Swedish ice hockey player
- Inge Hansen (born 1946), Norwegian handball player
- Inge Krokann (1893–1962), Norwegian writer
- Inge Lønning (1938–2013), Norwegian theologian and politician
- Inge Nissen Danish former basketball player and coach
- Inge Steensland (1923–2010), Norwegian resistance member
- Inge Thulin (born 1953), Swedish chief executive
- Inge Thun (1945–2008), Norwegian football goalkeeper
- Kjell Inge Røkke (born 1958), Norwegian businessman
- Stig Inge Bjørnebye (born 1969), Norwegian footballer

=== Feminine given name ===
- Inge Bauer (born 1940), East German pentathlete
- Inge Blask (born 1959), German politician
- Inge Bödding (born 1947), West German middle distance runner
- Inge Borkh (1921–2018), German soprano
- Inge Brück (1936–2025), German singer and actress
- Inge de Bruijn (born 1973), Dutch swimmer
- Inge Dekker (born 1985), Dutch swimmer
- Inge Deutschkron (1922–2022), German-Israeli journalist and author
- Inge Eriksen (1935–2015), Danish writer and political activist
- Inge Faes (born 1973), Belgian politician
- Inge Feltrinelli (1930–2018), German-born Italian photographer and director
- Inge Garstedt (born 1947), Swedish politician
- Inge Genefke (born 1938), Danish torture victim activist
- Inge Görmer (born 1934), East German speed skater
- Inge Gräßle (born 1961), German politician and MEP
- Inge Hecht (1947–2019), German politician
- Inge Helten (born 1950), West German sprinter
- Inge Heybroek (1915–1956), Dutch field hockey player
- Inge Hornstra (born 1974), Dutch-born Australian television and stage actress
- Inge Höger (born 1950), German politician
- Inge Janssen (born 1989). Dutch rower
- Inge Keller (1923–2017), German actress
- Inge Kilian (born 1935), German high jumper
- Inge King (1915–2016), German-born Australian sculptor
- Inge Koch (figure skater) (born 1910s), German figure skater
- Inge Lange (1927–2013), East German politician
- Inge Lehmann (1888–1993), Danish seismologist
- Inge Meysel (1910–2004), German actress
- Inge Morath (1923–2002), Austrian-born American photographer
- Inge Müller (1925–1966), East German author
- Inge Sargent (1932–2023), last Mahadevi of Hsipaw
- Inge Scholl (1917–1998), German resistance member
- Inge Sørensen (1924–2011), Danish swimmer
- Inge Stoll (1930–1958), German motorcycle racer
- Inge Vermeulen (1985–2015), Brazilian-born Dutch field hockey player
- Inge Vervotte (born 1977), Belgian government minister
- Inge Viermetz (1908–1997), German Nazi official
- Inge von Wangenheim (1912–1993), German actress, writer and communist
- Inge Wersin-Lantschner (1905–1997), Austrian alpine skier

=== Surname ===
- Peter Inge, Baron Inge (1935–2022), British soldier; Baron Inge, KG, GCB, PC, DL, former chief of the UK Defence Staff
- Brandon Inge (born 1977), American athlete (baseball), Detroit Tigers third baseman (1998–2012)
- M. Thomas Inge (1936–2021), American author
- Samuel Williams Inge (1817–1868), U.S. Congressman
- William Inge (disambiguation), several people known by that name, including the 20th-century American playwright

== See also ==
- Yngve
