= 2022 Washington Huskies football team =

American college football season

2022 Washington Huskies football

Alamo Bowl champion

Alamo Bowl, W 27–20 vs. Texas
- Conference: Pac-12 Conference

Ranking
- Coaches: No. 8
- AP: No. 8
- Record: 11–2 (7–2 Pac-12)
- Head coach: Kalen DeBoer (1st season)
- Offensive coordinator: Ryan Grubb (1st season)
- Offensive scheme: Spread
- Co-defensive coordinators: William Inge (1st season); Chuck Morrell (1st season)
- Base defense: 4–2–5
- Home stadium: Husky Stadium

2022 Pac-12 Conference football standings
	Conf.			Overall
Team	W		L	W		L
No. 12 USC y	8	–	1	11	–	3
No. 10 Utah y$	7	–	2	10	–	4
No. 8 Washington	7	–	2	11	–	2
No. 15 Oregon	7	–	2	10	–	3
No. 17 Oregon State	6	–	3	10	–	3
No. 21 UCLA	6	–	3	9	–	4
Washington State	4	–	5	7	–	6
Arizona	3	–	6	5	–	7
California	2	–	7	4	–	8
Arizona State†	2	–	7	3	–	9
Stanford	1	–	8	3	–	9
Colorado	1	–	8	1	–	11
Championship: Utah 47, USC 24
$ – Conference champion; y – Championship game participant; Rankings from AP Poll

The 2022 Washington Huskies football team represented the University of Washington as a member of the Pac-12 Conference during the 2022 NCAA Division I FBS football season. Led by first-year head coach Kalen DeBoer, the Huskies compiled an overall record of 11–2 with a mark of 7–2 in conference play, placing in a three-way tie for second in the Pac-12. Washington was invited to Alamo Bowl, where the Huskies defeated Texas. The team played home games at Husky Stadium in Seattle.

== Schedule ==
Date	Time	Opponent	Rank	Site	TV	Result	Attendance
September 3	7:30 p.m.	Kent State*		Husky Stadium; Seattle, WA	FS1	W 45–20	56,112
September 10	1:00 p.m.	Portland State*		Husky Stadium; Seattle, WA	P12N	W 52–6	57,518
September 17	4:30 p.m.	No. 11 Michigan State*		Husky Stadium; Seattle, WA	ABC	W 39–28	68,161
September 24	7:30 p.m.	Stanford	No. 18	Husky Stadium; Seattle, WA	FS1	W 40–22	65,438
September 30	7:30 p.m.	at UCLA	No. 15	Rose Bowl; Pasadena, CA	ESPN	L 32–40	41,343
October 8	1:00 p.m.	at Arizona State	No. 21	Sun Devil Stadium; Tempe, AZ	P12N	L 38–45	39,244
October 15	2:30 p.m.	Arizona^{†}		Husky Stadium; Seattle, WA	P12N	W 49–39	63,189
October 22	7:30 p.m.	at California		California Memorial Stadium; Berkeley, CA	ESPN	W 28–21	34,601
November 4	7:30 p.m.	No. 23 Oregon State		Husky Stadium; Seattle, WA	ESPN2	W 24–21	62,142
November 12	4:10 p.m.	at No. 6 Oregon	No. 25	Autzen Stadium; Eugene, OR (rivalry)	FOX	W 37–34	58,756
November 19	6:00 p.m.	Colorado	No. 17	Husky Stadium; Seattle, WA	P12N	W 54–7	67,969
November 26	7:30 p.m.	at Washington State	No. 13	Martin Stadium; Pullman, WA (Apple Cup)	ESPN	W 51–33	33,152
December 29	6:00 p.m.	vs. No. 20 Texas*	No. 12	Alamodome; San Antonio, TX (Alamo Bowl)	ESPN	W 27–20	62,730
*Non-conference game; ^{†}Homecoming; Rankings from AP Poll (and CFP Rankings, after November 1) - Released prior to game; All times are in Pacific time

== Rankings ==
Ranking movements Legend: ██ Increase in ranking ██ Decrease in ranking — = Not ranked RV = Received votes
	Week															
Poll	Pre	1	2	3	4	5	6	7	8	9	10	11	12	13	14	Final
AP	—	—	—	18	15	21	—	—	RV	RV	24	15	12	9	12	8
Coaches	—	—	RV	24	18	24	RV	RV	RV	RV	23	15	12	9	12	8
CFP	Not released									—	25	17	13	12	12	Not released

== Game summaries ==
=== vs Kent State ===
Kent State Golden Flashes (0–0) vs No. 18 Washington Huskies (0–0) – Game summary

Quarter	1	2	3	4	Total
Golden Flashes	7	6	0	7	20
Huskies	21	10	7	7	45

at Husky Stadium • Seattle, WA

- Date: September 3, 2022
- Game time: 7:30 p.m.
- Game weather: Overcast, 70 °F (21 °C)
- Game attendance: 56,112
- Referee: John Love
- TV announcers (FS1): Alex Faust (play-by-play), Petros Papadakis (analyst)

Game information

First quarter

- (12:50) WASH – Wayne Taulapapa 28-yard run, Peyton Henry kick (Drive: 4 plays, 37 yards, 1:54; Washington 7–0)
- (5:25) WASH – Taj Davis 32-yard pass from Michael Penix Jr., Peyton Henry kick (Drive: 10 plays, 90 yards, 4:17; Washington 14–0)
- (5:08) KENT – Devontez Walker 47-yard pass from Collin Schlee, Andrew Glass kick (Drive: 1 play, 47 yards, 0:09; Washington 14–7)
- (1:18) WASH – Cameron Davis 1-yard run, Peyton Henry kick (Drive: 10 plays, 75 yards, 3:44; Washington 21–7)

Second quarter

- (8:28) WASH – Rome Odunze 4-yard pass from Michael Penix, Peyton Henry kick (Drive: 10 plays, 83 yards, 5:23; Washington 28–7)
- (4:48) KENT – Andrew Glass 42-yard field goal (Drive: 10 plays, 50 yards, 3:40; Washington 28–10)
- (2:56) KENT – Andrew Glass 39-yard field goal (Drive: 5 plays, 13 yards, 1:41; Washington 28–13)
- (0:24) WASH – Peyton Henry 38-yard field goal (Drive: 11 plays, 52 yards, 2:27; Washington 31–13)

Third quarter

- (9:06) WASH – Jalen McMillan 13-yard pass from Michael Penix Jr., Peyton Henry kick (Drive: 13 plays, 74 yards, 5:47; Washington 38–13)

Fourth quarter

- (13:12) KENT – Marquez Cooper 1-yard run, Andrew Glass kick (Drive: 10 plays, 55 yards, 2:59; Washington 38–20)
- (11:50) WASH – Jalen McMillan 10-yard pass from Michael Penix Jr., Peyton Henry kick (Drive: 4 plays, 55 yards, 1:22; Washington 45–20)

Statistics	KENT	WASH
First downs	19	29
Total yards	340	525
Rushes/yards	39–147	34–132
Passing yards	193	393
Passing: Comp–Att–Int	14–29–3	29–44–0
Time of possession	27:21	32:29

Team	Category	Player	Statistics
Kent State	Passing	Collin Schlee	12/24, 178 yards, TD, 2 INT
Kent State	Rushing	Collin Schlee	8 carries, 47 yards
Kent State	Receiving	Dante Cephas	6 receptions, 150 yards
Washington	Passing	Michael Penix Jr.	26/39, 345 yards, 4 TD
Washington	Rushing	Wayne Taulapapa	11 carries, 57 yards, TD
Washington	Receiving	Jalen McMillan	5 receptions, 87 yards, 2 TD

=== vs Portland State ===
Portland State Vikings (0–1) vs Washington Huskies (1–0) – Game summary

Quarter	1	2	3	4	Total
Vikings	0	3	3	0	6
Huskies	14	17	14	7	52

at Husky Stadium • Seattle, WA

- Date: September 10, 2022
- Game time: 1:00 p.m.
- Game weather: Sunny, 86 °F (30 °C)
- Game attendance: 57,518
- Referee: Jim Wharrie
- TV announcers (Pac-12 Network): Elise Woodward (play-by-play), Max Browne (analyst)

Game information

First quarter

- (8:10) WASH – Cameron Davis 8-yard run, Peyton Henry kick (Drive: 10 plays, 77 yards, 4:34; Washington 7–0)
- (2:41) WASH – Ja'Lynn Polk 12-yard pass from Michael Penix Jr., Peyton Henry kick (Drive: 10 plays, 74 yards, 3:51; Washington 14–0)

Second quarter

- (9:51) WASH – Jalen McMillan 84-yard pass from Michael Penix Jr., Peyton Henry kick (Drive: 3 plays, 99 yards, 1:24; Washington 21–0)
- (4:44) PRST – Gianni Smith 23-yard field goal (Drive: 12 plays, 69 yards, 5:07; Washington 21–3)
- (2:13) WASH – Wayne Taulapapa 6-yard run, Peyton Henry kick (Drive: 7 plays, 72 yards, 2:28; Washington 28–3)
- (0:00) WASH – Peyton Henry 32-yard field goal (Drive: 5 plays, 46 yards, 0:34; Washington 31–3)

Third quarter

- (12:18) WASH – Will Nixon 4-yard run, Peyton Henry kick (Drive: 6 plays, 80 yards, 2:37; Washington 38–3)
- (7:43) PRST – Gianni Smith 40-yard field goal (Drive: 8 plays, 52 yards, 4:35; Washington 38–6)
- (2:28) WASH – Cameron Davis 3-yard run, Peyton Henry kick (Drive: 10 plays, 65 yards, 5:09; Washington 45–6)

Fourth quarter

- (5:12) WASH – Denzel Boston 2-yard run, Peyton Henry kick (Drive: 7 plays, 47 yards, 4:21; Washington 52–6)

Statistics	PRST	WASH
First downs	12	32
Total yards	131	617
Rushes/yards	31–81	40–241
Passing yards	50	376
Passing: Comp–Att–Int	7–20–0	23–33–1
Time of possession	27:21	32:39

Team	Category	Player	Statistics
Portland State	Passing	Dante Chachere	6/17, 50 yards
Portland State	Rushing	Jalynnee McGee	12 carries, 58 yards
Portland State	Receiving	Nate Bennett	3 receptions, 25 yards
Washington	Passing	Michael Penix Jr.	20/27, 337 yards, 2 TD, INT
Washington	Rushing	Wayne Taulapapa	12 carries, 94 yards, TD
Washington	Receiving	Jalen McMillan	4 receptions, 127 yards, TD

=== vs No. 11 Michigan State ===
No. 11 Michigan State Spartans (2–0) vs Washington Huskies (2–0) – Game summary

Quarter	1	2	3	4	Total
No. 11 Spartans	0	8	6	14	28
Huskies	9	20	7	3	39

at Husky Stadium • Seattle, WA

- Date: September 17, 2022
- Game time: 4:30 p.m.
- Game weather: Cloudy, 63 °F (17 °C)
- Game attendance: 68,161
- Referee: Jerry McGinn
- TV announcers (ABC): Mark Jones (play-by-play), Robert Griffin III (analyst), Quint Kessenich (sideline)

Game information

First quarter

- (11:12) WASH – Ja'Lynn Polk 8-yard pass from Michael Penix Jr., Peyton Henry kick (Drive: 7 plays, 77 yards, 3:48; Washington 7–0)
- (1:07) WASH – Team safety (Drive: 1 play, -2 yards, 0:23; Washington 9–0)

Second quarter

- (13:49) WASH – Cameron Davis 1-yard run, Peyton Henry kick (Drive: 6 plays, 50 yards, 2:18; Washington 16–0)
- (8:32) WASH – Wayne Taulapapa 19-yard pass from Michael Penix Jr. (Drive: 4 plays, 60 yards, 1:09; Washington 22–0)
- (1:30) MSU – Keon Coleman 7-yard pass from Payton Thorne, Payton Thorne two-point pass to Keon Coleman (Drive: 15 plays, 75 yards, 7:02; Washington 22–8)
- (0:04) WASH – Ja'Lynn Polk 17-yard pass from Michael Penix Jr., Peyton Henry kick (Drive: 8 plays, 65 yards, 1:26; Washington 29–8)

Third quarter

- (11:59) MSU – Tre Mosley 26-yard pass from Payton Thorne (Drive: 8 plays, 75 yards, 3:01; Washington 29–14)
- (11:02) WASH – Ja'Lynn Polk 53-yard pass from Michael Penix Jr., Peyton Henry kick (Drive: 4 plays, 73 yards, 0:57; Washington 36–14)

Fourth quarter

- (9:19) WASH – Peyton Henry 26-yard field goal (Drive: 4 plays, 2 yards, 0:56; Washington 39–14)
- (6:51) MSU – Elijah Collins 1-yard run (Drive: 8 plays, 70 yards, 2:28; Washington 39–20)
- (5:17) MSU – Keon Coleman 33-yard pass from Payton Thorne, Payton Thorne two-point pass to Keon Coleman (Drive: 4 plays, 75 yards, 1:07; Washington 39–28)

Statistics	MSU	WASH
First downs	21	24
Total yards	365	503
Rushes/yards	29–42	36–106
Passing yards	323	397
Passing: Comp–Att–Int	30–42–1	24–40–0
Time of possession	30:13	29:47

Team	Category	Player	Statistics
Michigan State	Passing	Payton Thorne	30/42, 323 yards, 3 TD, INT
Michigan State	Rushing	Jalen Berger	13 carries, 27 yards
Michigan State	Receiving	Keon Coleman	9 receptions, 116 yards, 2 TD
Washington	Passing	Michael Penix Jr.	24/40, 397 yards, 4 TD
Washington	Rushing	Cameron Davis	17 carries, 69 yards, TD
Washington	Receiving	Ja'Lynn Polk	6 receptions, 153 yards, 3 TD

=== vs Stanford ===
Stanford Cardinal (1–1) vs No. 18 Washington Huskies (3–0) – Game summary

Quarter	1	2	3	4	Total
Cardinal	0	7	0	15	22
No. 18 Huskies	7	10	7	13	37

at Husky Stadium • Seattle, WA

- Date: September 24, 2022
- Game time: 7:30 p.m.
- Game weather: Cloudy, 64 °F (18 °C)
- Game attendance: 52,218
- Referee: Steven Strimling
- TV announcers (FS1): Alex Faust (play-by-play), Petros Papadakis (analyst)

Game information

First quarter

- (10:32) WASH – Will Nixon 3-yard run, Peyton Henry kick (Drive: 6 plays, 58 yards, 2:27; Washington 7–0)

Second quarter

- (13:26) WASH – Peyton Henry 35-yard field goal (Drive: 13 plays, 69 yards, 5:03; Washington 10–0)
- (5:53) WASH – Wayne Taulapapa 34-yard run, Peyton Henry kick (Drive: 2 plays, 43 yards, 0:32; Washington 17–0)
- (4:00) STAN – Michael Wilson 23-yard pass from Tanner McKee, Joshua Karty kick (Drive: 7 plays, 75 yards, 1:47; Washington 17–7)

Third quarter

- (10:54) WASH – Peyton Henry 47-yard field goal (Drive: 9 plays, 46 yards, 4:06; Washington 20–7)
- (6:43) WASH – Rome Odunze 30-yard pass from Michael Penix Jr., Peyton Henry kick (Drive: 5 plays, 69 yards, 2:26; Washington 27–7)
- (2:49) WASH – Peyton Henry 32-yard field goal (Drive: 8 plays, 29 yards, 2:38; Washington 30–7)

Fourth quarter

- (13:58) STAN – John Humphreys 17-yard pass from Tanner McKee, Tanner McKee two-point pass to Brycen Tremayne (Drive: 10 plays, 75 yards, 3:51; Washington 30–15)
- (11:21) WASH – Peyton Henry 26-yard field goal (Drive: 5 plays, 66 yards, 2:37; Washington 33–15)
- (7:41) WASH – Giles Jackson 21-yard pass from Michael Penix Jr., Peyton Henry kick (Drive: 6 plays, 30 yards, 3:04; Washington 40–15)
- (1:45) STAN – Michael Wilson 78-yard pass from Tanner McKee, Joshua Karty kick (Drive: 4 plays, 92 yards, 1:18; Washington 40–22)

Statistics	STAN	WASH
First downs	18	23
Total yards	372	478
Rushes/yards	36–86	32–169
Passing yards	286	309
Passing: Comp–Att–Int	17–26–1	22–37–0
Time of possession	26:30	33:30

Team	Category	Player	Statistics
Stanford	Passing	Tanner McKee	17/26, 286 yards, 3 TD, INT
Stanford	Rushing	Casey Filkins	20 carries, 100 yards
Stanford	Receiving	Michael Wilson	6 receptions, 176 yards, 2 TD
Washington	Passing	Michael Penix Jr.	22/37, 309 yards, 2 TD
Washington	Rushing	Wayne Taulapapa	13 carries, 120 yards, TD
Washington	Receiving	Rome Odunze	8 receptions, 161 yards, TD

=== at UCLA ===
No. 15 Washington Huskies (4–0) at UCLA Bruins (4–0) – Game summary

Quarter	1	2	3	4	Total
No. 15 Huskies	7	3	6	16	32
Bruins	9	17	14	0	40

at Rose Bowl • Pasadena, CA

- Date: September 30, 2022
- Game time: 7:35 p.m.
- Game weather: Sunny, 68 °F (20 °C)
- Game attendance: 41,343
- Referee: Matthew Richards
- TV announcers (ESPN): Roy Philpott (play-by-play), Andre Ware (analyst), Paul Carcaterra (sideline)

Game information

First quarter

- (10:28) WASH – Rome Odunze 33-yard pass from Michael Penix Jr., Peyton Henry kick (Drive: 10 plays, 75 yards, 4:32; Washington 7–0)
- (7:06) UCLA – Team Safety (Drive: 2 plays, -3 yards, 0:54; Washington 7–2)
- (2:54) UCLA – Zach Charbonnet 1-yard run, Nicholas Barr-Mira kick (Drive: 11 plays, 93 yards, 4:12; UCLA 9–7)

Second quarter

- (12:41) WASH – Peyton Henry 50-yard field goal (Drive: 12 plays, 43 yards, 5:13; Washington 10–9)
- (9:50) UCLA – Jake Bobo 12-yard pass from Dorian Thompson-Robinson, Nicholas Barr-Mira kick (Drive: 7 plays, 75 yards, 2:51; UCLA 16–10)
- (8:02) UCLA – Kam Brown 15-yard pass from Dorian Thompson-Robinson, Nicholas Barr-Mira kick (Drive: 1 plays, 15 yards, 0:06; UCLA 23–10)
- (2:29) UCLA – Nicholas Barr-Mira 24-yard field goal (Drive: 9 plays, 62 yards, 3:38; UCLA 26–10)

Third quarter

- (11:35) UCLA – Dorian Thompson-Robinson 2-yard run, Nicholas Barr-Mira kick (Drive: 9 plays, 75 yards, 3:25; UCLA 33–10)
- (5:40) WASH – Jalen McMillan 19-yard pass from Michael Penix Jr. (Drive: 13 plays, 75 yards, 5:55; UCLA 33–16)
- (3:46) UCLA – Jake Bobo 39-yard pass from Dorian Thompson-Robinson, Nicholas Barr-Mira kick (Drive: 4 plays, 65 yards, 1:54; UCLA 40–16)

Fourth quarter

- (12:03) WASH – Devin Culp 4-yard pass from Michael Penix Jr., Ja'Lynn Polk two-point run (Drive: 12 plays, 78 yards, 6:43; UCLA 40–24)
- (3:59) WASH – Rome Odunze 9-yard pass from Michael Penix Jr., Michael Penix Jr. two-point pass to Jalen McMillan (Drive: 12 plays, 93 yards, 3:59; UCLA 40–32)

Statistics	WASH	UCLA
First downs	24	27
Total yards	410	499
Rushes/yards	23–65	39–184
Passing yards	345	315
Passing: Comp–Att–Int	33–49–2	24–33–0
Time of possession	31:24	28:36

Team	Category	Player	Statistics
Washington	Passing	Michael Penix Jr.	33/48, 345 yards, 4 TD, 2 INT
Washington	Rushing	Wayne Taulapapa	10 carries, 48 yards
Washington	Receiving	Rome Odunze	8 receptions, 116 yards, 2 TD
UCLA	Passing	Dorian Thompson-Robinson	24/33, 315 yards, 3 TD
UCLA	Rushing	Zach Charbonnet	22 carries, 124 yards, TD
UCLA	Receiving	Jake Bobo	6 receptions, 144 yards, 2 TD

=== at Arizona State ===
No. 21 Washington Huskies (4–1) at Arizona State Sun Devils (1–4) – Game summary

Quarter	1	2	3	4	Total
No. 21 Huskies	7	10	14	7	38
Sun Devils	3	21	14	7	45

at Sun Devil Stadium • Tempe, AZ

- Date: October 8, 2022
- Game time: 1:00 p.m.
- Game weather: Clear, 73 °F (23 °C)
- Game attendance: 39,244
- Referee: Michael Mothershed
- TV announcers (Pac-12 Network): J. B. Long (play-by-play), Lincoln Kennedy (analyst)

Game information

First quarter

- (10:29) WASH – Michael Penix Jr. 1-yard run, Peyton Henry kick (Drive: 12 plays, 75 yards, 4:31; Washington 7–0)
- (3:57) ASU – Carter Brown 53-yard field goal (Drive: 12 plays, 40 yards, 6:32; Washington 7–3)

Second quarter

- (13:15) WASH – Peyton Henry 27-yard field goal (Drive: 14 plays, 65 yards, 5:42; Washington 10–3)
- (8:45) ASU – Xazavian Valladay 11-yard run, Carter Brown kick (Drive: 10 plays, 75 yards, 4:30; Tied 10–10)
- (3:47) ASU – Xazavian Valladay 14-yard pass from Trenton Bourguet, Carter Brown kick (Drive: 11 plays, 90 yards, 4:03; Arizona State 17–10)
- (2:51) ASU – Jordan Clark 38-yard interception return, Carter Brown kick (Drive: 3 plays, 15 yards, 0:50; Arizona State 24–10)
- (0:34) WASH – Wayne Taulapapa 1-yard run, Peyton Henry kick (Drive: 9 plays, 75 yards, 2:17; Arizona State 24–17)

Third quarter

- (8:57) ASU – Elijhah Badger 10-yard pass from Trenton Bourguet, Carter Brown kick (Drive: 5 plays, 29 yards, 2:40; Arizona State 31–17)
- (6:36) WASH – Cameron Davis 4-yard run, Peyton Henry kick (Drive: 6 plays, 75 yards, 2:21; Arizona State 31–24)
- (4:45) ASU – Daniyel Ngata 1-yard run, Carter Brown kick (Drive: 5 plays, 79 yards, 1:46; Arizona State 38–24)
- (0:36) WASH – Cameron Davis 1-yard run, Peyton Henry kick (Drive: 12 plays, 75 yards, 4:09; Arizona State 38–31)

Fourth quarter

- (12:09) WASH – Cameron Davis 5-yard run, Peyton Henry kick (Drive: 5 plays, 53 yards, 2:39; Tied 38–38)
- (7:27) ASU – Elijhah Badger 2-yard pass from Trenton Bourguet, Carter Brown kick (Drive: 10 plays, 82 yards, 4:35; Arizona State 45–38)

Statistics	WASH	ASU
First downs	32	23
Total yards	458	397
Rushes/yards	33–134	32–156
Passing yards	324	241
Passing: Comp–Att–Int	34–54–1	22–30–1
Time of possession	31:57	28:03

Team	Category	Player	Statistics
Washington	Passing	Michael Penix Jr.	33/53, 311 yards, INT
Washington	Rushing	Cameron Davis	9 carries, 77 yards, 3 TD
Washington	Receiving	Rome Odunze	9 receptions, 115 yards
Arizona State	Passing	Trenton Bourguet	15/21, 182 yards, 3 TD, INT
Arizona State	Rushing	Xazavian Valladay	23 carries, 111 yards, TD
Arizona State	Receiving	Bryan Thompson	3 receptions, 78 yards

=== vs Arizona ===
Arizona Wildcats (3–3) vs Washington Huskies (4–2) – Game summary

Quarter	1	2	3	4	Total
Wildcats	7	7	10	15	39
Huskies	7	14	21	7	49

at Husky Stadium • Seattle, WA

- Date: October 15, 2022
- Game time: 2:30 p.m.
- Game weather: Sunny, 73 °F (23 °C)
- Game attendance: 63,189
- Referee: Francisco Villar
- TV announcers (Pac-12 Network): Ted Robinson (play-by-play), Yogi Roth (analyst)

Game information

First quarter

- (10:25) WASH – Jalen McMillan 23-yard pass from Michael Penix Jr., Peyton Henry kick (Drive: 5 plays, 46 yards, 2:45; Washington 7–0)
- (1:48) ARIZ – Tetairoa McMillan 46-yard pass from Jayden de Laura, Tyler Loop kick (Drive: 4 plays, 79 yards, 2:01; Tied 7–7)

Second quarter

- (13:46) WASH – Cameron Davis 1-yard run, Peyton Henry kick (Drive: 7 plays, 75 yards, 2:54; Washington 14–7)
- (2:23) ARIZ – Dorian Singer 39-yard pass from Jayden de Laura, Tyler Loop kick (Drive: 4 plays, 55 yards, 1:27; Tied 14–14)
- (0:08) WASH – Sam Adams II 4-yard pass from Michael Penix Jr., Peyton Henry kick (Drive: 12 plays, 75 yards, 2:15; Washington 21–14)

Third quarter

- (14:14) WASH – Rome Odunze 45-yard pass from Michael Penix Jr., Peyton Henry kick (Drive: 2 plays, 48 yards, 0:45; Washington 28–14)
- (12:16) ARIZ – Jonah Coleman 3-yard run, Tyler Loop kick (Drive: 4 plays, 75 yards, 1:58; Washington 28–21)
- (8:15) WASH – Michael Penix Jr. 8-yard run, Peyton Henry kick (Drive: 9 plays, 77 yards, 3:51; Washington 35–21)
- (4:01) ARIZ – Tyler Loop 48-yard field goal (Drive: 10 plays, 44 yards, 4:14; Washington 35–24)
- (1:56) WASH – Rome Odunze 48-yard pass from Michael Penix Jr., Peyton Henry kick (Drive: 6 plays, 75 yards, 2:05; Washington 42–24)

Fourth quarter

- (13:14) ARIZ – Tanner McLachlan 20-yard Jayden de Laura, Tyler Loop kick (Drive: 10 plays, 75 yards, 3:42; Washington 42–31)
- (9:51) ARIZ – Tetairoa McMillan 26-yard pass from Jayden de Laura, Jayden de Laura two-point pass to Jonah Coleman (Drive: 4 plays, 71 yards, 1:31; Washington 42–39)
- (5:30) WASH – Cameron Davis 19-yard run, Peyton Henry kick (Drive: 8 plays, 75 yards, 4:21; Washington 49–39)

Statistics	ARIZ	WASH
First downs	31	31
Total yards	526	595
Rushes/yards	33–126	29–79
Passing yards	400	516
Passing: Comp–Att–Int	25–35–0	36–44–0
Time of possession	28:45	31:15

Team	Category	Player	Statistics
Arizona	Passing	Jayden de Laura	25/34, 400 yards, 4 TD
Arizona	Rushing	Jonah Coleman	14 carries, 53 yards, TD
Arizona	Receiving	Tetairoa McMillan	7 receptions, 132 yards, 2 TD
Washington	Passing	Michael Penix Jr.	36/44, 516 yards, 4 TD
Washington	Rushing	Cameron Davis	8 carries, 41 yards, 2 TD
Washington	Receiving	Rome Odunze	9 receptions, 169 yards, 2 TD

=== at California ===
Washington Huskies (5–2) at California Golden Bears (3–3) – Game summary

Quarter	1	2	3	4	Total
Huskies	6	0	8	14	28
Golden Bears	0	0	14	7	21

at California Memorial Stadium • Berkeley, CA

- Date: October 22, 2022
- Game time: 7:35 p.m.
- Game weather: Party cloudy, 69 °F (21 °C)
- Game attendance: 34,601
- Referee: Mike McCabe
- TV announcers (ESPN): Dave Flemming (play-by-play), Rod Gilmore (analyst), Tiffany Blackmon (sideline)

Game information

First quarter

- (10:45) WASH – Peyton Henry 40-yard field goal (Drive: 10 plays, 52 yards, 4:15; Washington 3–0)
- (2:01) WASH – Peyton Henry 35-yard field goal (Drive: 14 plays, 62 yards, 6:18; Washington 6–0)

Second quarter

None

Third quarter

- (10:20) CAL – J. Michael Sturdivant 8-yard pass from Jack Plummer, Dario Longhetto kick (Drive: 13 plays, 75 yards, 4:40; California 7–6)
- (4:48) WASH – Cameron Davis 6-yard run, Michael Penix Jr. two-point pass to Ja'Lynn Polk (Drive: 11 plays, 70 yards, 5:32; Washington 14–7)
- (2:10) CAL – J. Michael Sturdivant 48-yard pass from Jack Plummer, Dario Longhetto kick (Drive: 6 plays, 65 yards, 2:38; Tied 14–14)

Fourth quarter

- (13:49) WASH – Jalen McMillan 13-yard pass from Michael Penix Jr., Peyton Henry kick (Drive: 10 plays, 75 yards, 3:21; Washington 21–14)
- (10:19) WASH – Richard Newton 36-yard pass from Michael Penix Jr., Peyton Henry kick (Drive: 6 plays, 67 yards, 2:15; Washington 28–14)
- (6:11) CAL – Mavin Anderson 8-yard pass from Jack Plummer, Dario Longhetto kick (Drive: 12 plays, 80 yards, 4:08; Washington 28–21)

Statistics	WASH	CAL
First downs	28	18
Total yards	476	306
Rushes/yards	32–102	31–61
Passing yards	374	245
Passing: Comp–Att–Int	36–51–0	21–34–0
Time of possession	35:25	24:35

Team	Category	Player	Statistics
Washington	Passing	Michael Penix Jr.	36/51, 374 yards, 2 TD
Washington	Rushing	Cameron Davis	13 carries, 46 yards, TD
Washington	Receiving	Jalen McMillan	8 receptions, 81 yards, TD
California	Passing	Jack Plummer	21/34, 245 yards, 3 TD
California	Rushing	DeCarlos Brooks	10 carries, 43 yards
California	Receiving	J. Michael Sturdivant	8 receptions, 104 yards, 2 TD

=== vs No. 23 Oregon State ===
No. 23 Oregon State Beavers (6–2) vs Washington Huskies (6–2) – Game summary

Quarter	1	2	3	4	Total
No. 23 Beavers	7	7	7	0	21
Huskies	0	7	7	10	24

at Husky Stadium • Seattle, WA

- Date: November 4, 2022
- Game time: 7:35 p.m.
- Game weather: Cloudy, 57 °F (14 °C)
- Game attendance: 62,142
- Referee: Michael Mothershed
- TV announcers (ESPN2): Roy Philpott (play-by-play), Andre Ware (analyst), Paul Carcaterra (sideline)

Game information

First quarter

- (10:01) OSU – Deshaun Fenwick 3-yard run, Everett Hayes kick (Drive 9 plays, 75 yards, 4:59; Oregon State 7–0)

Second quarter

- (4:23) WASH – Wayne Taulapapa 2-yard run, Peyton Henry kick (Drive 15 plays, 85 yards, 6:46; Tied 7–7)
- (1:10) OSU – Easton Mascarenas-Arnold 37-yard interception return, Everett Hayes kick (Drive 2 plays, 8 yards, 0:33; Oregon State 14–7)

Third quarter

- (6:47) WASH – Jack Westover 24-yard pass from Michael Penix Jr., Peyton Henry kick (Drive 8 plays, 35 yards, 4:10; Tied 14–14)
- (0:39) OSU – Deshaun Fenwick 19-yard run, Everett Hayes kick (Drive 11 plays, 79 yards, 6:08; Oregon State 21–14)

Fourth quarter

- (11:36) WASH – Wayne Taulapapa 4-yard run, Peyton Henry kick (Drive 9 plays, 66 yards, 4:03; Tied 21–21)
- (0:08) WASH – Peyton Henry 22-yard field goal (Drive 18 plays, 92 yards, 4:25; Washington 24–21)

Statistics	OSU	WASH
First downs	18	24
Total yards	262	398
Rushes/yards	40–175	24–100
Passing yards	87	298
Passing: Comp–Att–Int	12–19–0	30–52–1
Time of possession	31:46	28:14

Team	Category	Player	Statistics
Oregon State	Passing	Ben Gulbranson	12/19, 87 yards
Oregon State	Rushing	Damien Martinez	19 carries, 107 yards
Oregon State	Receiving	Damien Martinez	1 reception, 40 yards
Washington	Passing	Michael Penix Jr.	30/52, 298 yards, TD, INT
Washington	Rushing	Cameron Davis	11 carries, 55 yards
Washington	Receiving	Rome Odunze	7 receptions, 102 yards

=== at No. 6 Oregon ===
No. 25 Washington Huskies (7–2) at No. 6 Oregon Ducks (8–1) – Game summary

Quarter	1	2	3	4	Total
No. 25 Huskies	7	6	14	10	37
No. 6 Ducks	3	7	21	3	34

at Autzen Stadium • Eugene, OR

- Date: November 12, 2022
- Game time: 4:00 p.m.
- Game weather: Sunny, 50 °F (10 °C)
- Game attendance: 58,756
- Referee: Francisco Villar
- TV announcers (FOX): Jason Benetti (play-by-play), Brock Huard (analyst), Allison Williams (sideline)

Game information

First quarter

- (9:36) WASH – Wayne Taulapapa 13-yard run, Peyton Henry kick (Drive: 12 plays, 75 yards, 5:24; Washington 7–0)
- (5:14) ORE – Camden Lewis 43-yard field goal (Drive: 10 plays, 40 yards, 4:22; Washington 7–3)

Second quarter

- (14:57) WASH – Peyton Henry 30-yard field goal (Drive: 10 plays, 63 yards, 5:17; Washington 10–3)
- (4:03) ORE – Bo Nix 10-yard run, Camden Lewis kick (Drive: 8 plays, 47 yards, 4:00; Tied 10–10)
- (1:46) WASH – Peyton Henry 27-yard field goal (Drive: 5 plays, 40 yards, 2:16; Washington 13–10)

Third quarter

- (13:16) ORE – Dont'e Thornton 46-yard pass from Bo Nix, Camden Lewis kick (Drive: 4 plays, 65 yards, 1:44; Oregon 17–13)
- (9:21) WASH – Cameron Davis 3-yard run, Peyton Henry kick (Drive: 10 plays, 65 yards, 3:55; Washington 20–17)
- (6:24) ORE – Noah Whittington 29-yard run, Camden Lewis kick (Drive: 6 plays, 76 yards, 2:52; Oregon 24–20)
- (5:30) WASH – Ja'Lynn Polk 76-yard pass from Michael Penix Jr., Peyton Henry kick (Drive: 2 plays, 75 yards, 0:54; Washington 27–24)
- (3:40) ORE – Troy Franklin 67-yard pass from Bo Nix, Camden Lewis kick (Drive: 4 plays, 89 yards, 1:45; Oregon 31–27)

Fourth quarter

- (3:54) ORE – Camden Lewis 26-yard field goal (Drive: 20 plays, 91 yards, 10:33; Oregon 34–27)
- (3:07) WASH – Taj Davis 62-yard pass from Michael Penix Jr., Peyton Henry kick (Drive: 3 plays, 65 yards, 0:47; Tied 34–34)
- (0:51) WASH – Peyton Henry 43-yard field goal (Drive: 4 plays, 8 yards, 0:35; Washington 37–34)

Statistics	WASH	ORE
First downs	23	32
Total yards	522	592
Rushes/yards	22–114	51–312
Passing yards	408	280
Passing: Comp–Att–Int	26–35–1	19–28–0
Time of possession	25:29	34:31

Team	Category	Player	Statistics
Washington	Passing	Michael Penix Jr.	26/35, 408 yards, 2 TD, INT
Washington	Rushing	Wayne Taulapapa	10 carries, 70 yards, TD
Washington	Receiving	Jalen McMillan	8 receptions, 122 yards
Oregon	Passing	Bo Nix	19/27, 280 yards, 2 TD
Oregon	Rushing	Bucky Irving	19 carries, 143 yards
Oregon	Receiving	Troy Franklin	5 receptions, 139 yards, TD

=== vs Colorado ===
Colorado Buffaloes (1–9) vs No. 17 Washington Huskies (8–2) – Game summary

Quarter	1	2	3	4	Total
Buffaloes	0	0	7	0	7
No. 17 Huskies	14	19	14	7	54

at Husky Stadium • Seattle, WA

- Date: November 19, 2022
- Game time: 6:00 p.m. PST
- Game weather: Clear, 38 °F (3 °C)
- Game attendance: 67,969
- Referee: Jim Wharrie
- TV announcers (Pac-12 Network): Ted Robinson (play-by-play), Yogi Roth (analyst)

Game information

First quarter

- (5:18) WASH – Wayne Taulapapa 8-yard run, Peyton Henry kick (Drive: 12 plays, 85 yards, 5:51; Washington 7–0)
- (2:19) WASH – Jalen McMillan 27-yard pass from Michael Penix Jr., Peyton Henry kick (Drive: 2 plays, 38 yards, 0:46; Washington 14–0)

Second quarter

- (10:33) WASH – Wayne Taulapapa 2-yard run, Peyton Henry kick (Drive: 12 plays, 57 yards, 4:46; Washington 21–0)
- (1:32) WASH – Team safety (Drive: 4 plays, -31 yards, 0:23; Washington 23–0)
- (0:15) WASH – Cameron Davis 4-yard run, Peyton Henry kick (Drive: 7 plays, 45 yards, 1:10; Washington 30–0)
- (0:00) WASH – Peyton Henry 33-yard field goal (Drive: 2 plays, 0 yards, 0:11; Washington 33–0)

Third quarter

- (8:51) WASH – Cameron Davis 6-yard run, Peyton Henry kick (Drive: 4 plays, 43 yards, 1:27; Washington 40–0)
- (2:11) WASH – Richard Newton 2-yard run, Peyton Henry kick (Drive: 9 plays, 59 yards, 3:48; Washington 47–0)
- (1:45) COL – Montana Lemonious-Craig 69-yard pass from J. T. Shrout, Cole Becker kick (Drive: 2 plays, 69 yards, 0:18; Washington 47–7)

Fourth quarter

- (8:10) WASH – Sam Adams II 15-yard pass from Dylan Morris, Addison Shrock kick (Drive: 12 plays, 87 yards, 5:57; Washington 54–7)

Statistics	COL	WASH
First downs	10	29
Total yards	202	575
Rushes/yards	33–79	43–280
Passing yards	123	295
Passing: Comp–Att–Int	7–22–1	23–38–1
Time of possession	27:13	32:47

Team	Category	Player	Statistics
Colorado	Passing	J. T. Shrout	6/18, 120 yards, TD, INT
Colorado	Rushing	Alex Fontenot	11 carries, 71 yards
Colorado	Receiving	Montana Lemonious-Craig	1 reception, 69 yards, TD
Washington	Passing	Michael Penix Jr.	19/31, 229 yards, TD
Washington	Rushing	Wayne Taulapapa	11 carries, 107 yards, 2 TD
Washington	Receiving	Jalen McMillan	8 receptions, 98 yards, TD

=== at Washington State ===
No. 13 Washington Huskies (9–2) at Washington State Cougars (7–4) – Game summary

Quarter	1	2	3	4	Total
No. 13 Huskies	7	21	7	16	51
Cougars	10	17	6	0	33

at Martin Stadium • Pullman, WA

- Date: November 26, 2022
- Game time: 7:30 p.m.
- Game weather: Sunny, 32 °F (0 °C)
- Game attendance: 33,152
- Referee: Matthew Richards
- TV announcers (ESPN): Clay Matvick (play-by-play), Rocky Boiman (analyst), Dawn Davenport (sideline)

Game information

First quarter

- (12:18) WSU – Dean Janikowski 50-yard field goal (Drive: 8 plays, 42 yards, 2:42; Washington State 3–0)
- (5:23) WASH – Ja'Lynn Polk 26-yard pass from Michael Penix Jr., Peyton Henry kick (Drive: 4 plays, 44 yards, 1:37; Washington 7–3)
- (0:53) WSU – Cameron Ward 14-yard run, Dean Janikowski kick (Drive: 11 plays, 75 yards, 4:30; Washington State 10–7)

Second quarter

- (13:27) WASH – Rome Odunze 47-yard pass from Michael Penix Jr., Peyton Henry kick (Drive: 7 plays, 79 yards, 2:20; Washington 14–10)
- (11:05) WSU – Robert Ferrel 34-yard pass from Cameron Ward, Dean Janikowski kick (Drive: 8 plays, 70 yards, 2:18; Washington State 17–14)
- (9:41) WASH – Michael Penix Jr. 30-yard run, Peyton Henry kick (Drive: 4 plays, 75 yards, 1:24; Washington 21–17)
- (5:07) WSU – Nakia Watson 15-yard pass from Cameron Ward, Dean Janikowski kick (Drive: 10 plays, 70 yards, 4:29; Washington State 24–21)
- (1:40) WASH – Michael Penix Jr. 4-yard run, Peyton Henry kick (Drive: 8 plays, 83 yards, 3:22; Washington 28–24)
- (0:00) WSU – Dean Janikowski 29-yard field goal (Drive: 12 plays, 63 yards, 1:40; Washington 28–27)

Third quarter

- (14:50) WASH – Jalen McMillan 75-yard pass from Michael Penix Jr., Peyton Henry kick (Drive: 1 play, 75 yards, 0:10; Washington 35–27)
- (6:30) WSU – Nakia Watson 4-yard run (Drive: 9 plays, 58 yards, 4:36; Washington 35–33)

Fourth quarter

- (14:30) WASH – Rome Odunze 5-yard run (Drive: 5 plays, 72 yards, 1:23; Washington 41–33)
- (5:02) WASH – Peyton Henry 20-yard field goal (Drive: 15 plays, 94 yards, 6:09; Washington 44–33)
- (1:28) WASH – Wayne Taulapapa 40-yard run, Peyton Henry kick (Drive: 3 plays, 57 yards, 0:57; Washington 51–33)

Statistics	WASH	WSU
First downs	30	28
Total yards	703	433
Rushes/yards	24–218	36–75
Passing yards	485	358
Passing: Comp–Att–Int	25–43–1	34–53–0
Time of possession	26:32	33:28

Team	Category	Player	Statistics
Washington	Passing	Michael Penix Jr.	25/43, 485 yards, 3 TD, INT
Washington	Rushing	Wayne Taulapapa	13 carries, 126 yards, TD
Washington	Receiving	Rome Odunze	5 receptions, 157 yards, TD
Washington State	Passing	Cam Ward	33/52, 322 yards, 2 TD
Washington State	Rushing	Nakia Watson	15 carries, 73 yards, TD
Washington State	Receiving	Robert Ferrel	4 receptions, 71 yards, TD

=== vs No. 20 Texas (Alamo Bowl) ===
No. 20 Texas Longhorns (8–4) vs No. 12 Washington Huskies (10–2) – Game summary
(2022 Alamo Bowl)

Quarter	1	2	3	4	Total
No. 20 Longhorns	3	0	7	10	20
No. 12 Huskies	10	3	7	7	27

at Alamodome • San Antonio, TX

- Date: December 29, 2022
- Game time: 8:00 p.m. CST
- Game weather: Indoor
- Game attendance: 62,730
- Referee: Gary Patterson
- TV announcers (ESPN): Tom Hart (play-by-play), Jordan Rodgers (analyst), Cole Cubelic (sideline)

Game information

First quarter

- (11:44) WASH – Peyton Henry 46-yard field goal (Drive: 4 plays, 1 yard, 0:56; Washington 3–0)
- (7:52) TEX – Bert Auburn 30-yard field goal (Drive: 10 plays, 78 yards, 3:52; Tied 3–3)
- (3:17) WASH – Wayne Taulapapa 42-yard run, Peyton Henry kick (Drive: 10 plays, 88 yards, 4:35; Washington 10–3)

Second quarter

- (0:00) WASH – Peyton Henry 23-yard field goal (Drive: 16 plays, 74 yards, 4:50; Washington 13–3)

Third quarter

- (12:31) TEX – Jonathon Brooks 34-yard pass from Quinn Ewers, Bert Auburn kick (Drive: 7 plays, 75 yards, 2:29; Washington 13–10)
- (6:44) WASH – Taj Davis 6-yard pass from Michael Penix Jr., Peyton Henry kick (Drive: 13 plays, 75 yards, 5:47; Washington 20–10)

Fourth quarter

- (13:08) WASH – Jalen McMillan 8-yard pass from Michael Penix Jr., Peyton Henry kick (Drive: 14 plays, 90 yards, 6:57; Washington 27–10)
- (9:50) TEX – Jonathon Brooks 3-yard run, Bert Auburn kick (Drive: 11 plays, 74 yards, 3:18; Washington 27–17)
- (1:40) TEX – Bert Auburn 26-yard field goal (Drive: 10 plays, 55 yards, 2:41; Washington 27–20)

Statistics	TEX	WASH
First downs	19	25
Total yards	420	445
Rushes/yards	18–51	28–158
Passing yards	369	287
Passing: Comp–Att–Int	31–47–0	32–55–1
Time of possession	24:14	35:46

Team	Category	Player	Statistics
Texas	Passing	Quinn Ewers	31/47, 369 yards, TD
Texas	Rushing	Keilan Robinson	8 carries, 27 yards
Texas	Receiving	Casey Cain	4 receptions, 108 yards
Washington	Passing	Michael Penix Jr.	32/54, 287 yards, 2 TD, INT
Washington	Rushing	Wayne Taulapapa	14 carries, 108 yards, TD
Washington	Receiving	Jalen McMillan	8 receptions, 58 yards, TD

== Roster ==
2022 Washington Huskies football team roster
Players
Coaches
Offense

Pos.	#	Name	Class
WR	0	Giles Jackson	Jr
WR	1	Rome Odunze	So
WR	2	Ja'Lynn Polk	Fr
WR	3	Taj Davis	So
WR	4	Lonyatta Alexander Jr.	Fr
QB	5	Dylan Morris	So
RB	6	Richard Newton	Jr
QB	7	Sam Huard	Fr
WR/RB	8	Will Nixon	Fr
QB	9	Michael Penix Jr.	Jr
WR	11	Jalen McMillan	So
WR	12	Denzel Boston	Fr
QB	13	Camdyn Stiegeler	Fr
QB	14	Tyson Lang	Fr
WR	15	Jabez Tinae	Fr
QB	17	Teddy Purcell	Fr
RB	18	Camden Sirmon	Fr
WR	19	Nick Juran	So
RB	21	Wayne Tualapapa	GS
RB	22	Cameron Davis	So
RB	26	Jay'Veon Sunday	Fr
RB	28	Sam Adams II	Fr
WR	29	Brennan Holmes	Sr
WR	30	David Pritchard	Jr
RB	32	Aaron Dumas	So
TE	35	Caden Jumper	Fr
TE	36	Owen Coutts	So
TE	37	Jack Westover	Jr
TE	39	Zeke Pelluer	So
OL	50	Myles Murao	Fr
OL	51	Jaxson Kirkland	Sr
OL	55	Troy Fautanu	So
OL	56	Geirean Hatchett	Fr
OL	64	Gaard Memmelaar	Jr
OL	65	Samuel Peacock	Fr
OL	66	Henry Bainivalu	Sr
OL	70	Owen Prentice	Fr
OL	71	Nate Kalepo	So
OL	72	Parker Brailsford	Fr
OL	73	Roger Rosengarten	Fr
OL	74	Corey Luciano	Sr
OL	75	Robert Wyrsch	Fr
OL	77	Julius Buelow	So
OL	78	Matteo Mele	Jr
OL	79	Victor Curne	Jr
WR	80	Jake Parnagian	Fr
WR	81	Mason Wheeler	So
TE	83	Devin Culp	Jr
WR	84	Jackson Girouard	Fr
TE	86	Griffin Waiss	Fr
TE	87	Ryan Otton	Fr
TE	88	Quentin Moore	So
TE	91	John Frazier	Fr

Defense

Pos.	#	Name	Class
DE	0	Sav'ell Smalls	So
CB	1	Jordan Perryman	Sr
LB	2	Cam Bright	Sr
DE	3	Jeremiah Martin	Sr
S	5	Alex Cook	Sr
S	6	Cameron Williams	Jr
S	7	Dominique Hampton	Jr
DE	8	Bralen Trice	So
LB	9	Kristopher Moll	GS
CB	10	Davon Banks	Fr
LB	11	Alphonzo Tuputala	So
S	12	Tristan Dunn	Fr
OLB	13	Kamren Fabiculanan	So
CB	14	Zakhari Spears	Fr
LB	15	Daniel Heimuli	So
LB	18	Styles Siva-Tu'u	Fr
OLB	19	Dyson McCutcheon	Fr
S	20	Asa Turner	Jr
CB	22	Jaivion Green	Fr
CB	23	Mishael Powell	So
S	24	Makell Esteen	Fr
CB	25	Elijah Jackson	Fr
S	28	Vincent Nunley	Fr
CB	29	Julius Irvin	Jr
S	30	Sean Toomey-Stout	So
CB	31	Jakson Berman	Fr
S	32	Tristan Warner	Fr
CB	34	Antonio Hill	Jr
CB	40	Anay Nagarajan	Fr
DE	41	Lance Holtzclaw	Fr
LB	42	Carson Bruener	So
LB	44	Austin Harnetiaux	Fr
DE	45	Maurice Heims	Fr
DE	46	Sekai Asoau-Afoa	Jr
DE	46	Gage Harty	Jr
LB	48	Edefuan Ulofoshio	Jr
LB	49	Griffin Miller	Fr
LB	50	Jahleel Heath	Fr
DE	52	Milton Hopkins Jr.	Fr
LB	54	Drew Fowler	So
DL	55	Jacob Bandes	So
LB	56	Ruperake Fuavai	So
DE	58	Zion Tupuola-Fetui	Jr
DL	68	Ulumoo Ale	Jr
DE	88	Jake Jennings	Fr
DL	90	Voi Tunuufi	So
DL	91	Tuli Letuligasenoa	Jr
DL	93	Siaosi Finau	Fr
DL	94	Jayvon Parker	Fr
DL	95	Armon Parker	Fr
DL	97	Bradley McGannon	Fr
DL	98	Kuao Peihopa	Fr
DL	99	Faatui Tuitele	So

Special teams

Pos.	#	Name	Class
P	38	Jack McCallister	Fr
K	47	Peyton Henry	Sr
LS	49	Alex Froelich	Fr
LS	82	Caleb Johnston	Fr
K	85	Addison Shrock	Fr
LS	89	Jaden Green	So
P	90	Kevin Ryan	Sr
K	95	Grady Gross	Fr

Head coach

- Kalen DeBoer

Coordinators/assistant coaches

- Ryan Grubb – Offensive coordinator/quarterbacks
- William Inge – Assistant head coach/co-defensive coordinator/linebackers
- Chuck Morrell – Co-defensive coordinator/safeties
- Eric Schmidt – Special teams coordinator/Edges
- JaMarcus Shephard – Passing game coordinator/wide receivers
- Inoke Breckterfield – Defensive line
- Lee Marks – Assistant head coach/running backs
- Scott Huff – Offensive line
- Nick Sheridan – Tight ends
- Ron McKeefery – Director, strength and conditioning
- Zack Cook – Assistant, strength and conditioning
- Bryan Fink – Assistant, strength and conditioning
- A. J. Middleton – Assistant, strength and conditioning
- Mitch Dahlen – Quality control, offense
- Tyson Prince – Quality control, offense
- Nick Brautigam – Quality control, defense
- C. J. McGorisk – Quality control, defense
- Paul Creighton – Quality control, special teams
- Taylor Pope – Graduate Assistant, offense
- Jon Rowe – Graduate Assistant, offense
- Eric Amoako – Graduate Assistant, defense
- Jaylen Johnson – Graduate Assistant, defense
- Ben Creamer – Director, sports science

Legend

- (C) Team captain
- (S) Suspended
- (I) Ineligible
- Injured
- Redshirt

Roster
Last update: 9/30/22

== Notes ==
- Michael Penix, Jr. set a new University of Washington record for passing yards in a season with 4,641 yards. This eclipsed Cody Pickett's 4,458 yards from 2002.
