= Yngve =

- Name day: 11 February (Sweden)

Origin
- Origin: Scandinavian
- Region of origin: Sweden, Norway

Other names
- Related names: Yngvi, Inge

Yngve is a Scandinavian male given name, mostly used in Sweden and Norway. It is the modern form of either Old Norse Yngvi or of Ingwin. Yngvi was the Old Norse name of the Germanic god Ingu-, later identified with Freyr, or of Ingwian- "belonging to the tribe of the Ingvaeones" (who were in turn named after Ingu-.

The name is most common among Swedish men over the age of 50, and occurs almost exclusively as a middle name among the youngest. Due to its Viking origins, the name was very popular during the 19th century and the national romantic era.

As of 31 December 2005, there are a total of 18,578 Swedes with the name, of which 4756 use it as their main first name. As of 1 January 2006 there are 2370 Norwegians with Yngve as their first name, 1924 of whom use it as their only first name. In Finland there are 1046 people named Yngve.

Its namesday in the Swedish name day list of 2001 is 11 February.

Notable people named Yngve include:

== Given name ==
- Yngve Andersen (born 1948), Norwegian footballer
- Yngve Brilioth (1891–1959), Archbishop of Uppsala
- Yngve Brodd (1930–2016), Swedish football player
- Yngve Casslind (1932–1992), Swedish ice hockey player
- Yngve Ekstrand (1888–1951), Swedish Navy rear admiral
- Yngve Ekström (1913–1988), Swedish furniture designer
- Yngve Engkvist (1918–1982), Swedish Olympic sailor
- Yngve Gamlin (1926–1995), Swedish actor and film director
- Yngve Häckner (1895–1987), Swedish javelin thrower and politician
- Yngve Hågensen (born 1938), Norwegian political consultant
- Yngve Hallén (born 1968), president of the Norwegian Football Association
- Yngve Holm (1895–1943), Swedish sailor
- Yngve Holmberg (1925–2011), Swedish politician
- Yngve Johansson (footballer), Swedish footballer
- Yngve Johansson (ice hockey) (1929–2002), Swedish ice hockey player
- Yngve Johnson (1895–1949), Swedish diver
- Yngve Kalin (born 1950), Swedish priest in Hyssna
- Yngve Karlsen (1930-2010), Norwegian footballer
- Yngve Karlsson (1929–2016), Swedish ice hockey player
- Yngve A. A. Larsson (1917–2014), Swedish pediatrician
- Yngve Larsson (1881–1977), Swedish politician
- Yngve Liljeberg (1909–1978), Swedish ice hockey player
- Yngve Lindgren (1912–1990), Swedish footballer
- Yngve Lindqvist (1897–1937), Swedish sport sailor
- Yngve Lundh (1924–2017), Swedish cyclist
- Yngve Eilert Määttä (1935–2011), Swedish ice hockey player and coach
- Yngwie Malmsteen (born Lars Johan Yngve Lannerbäck in 1963), Swedish guitarist
- Yngve Moe (1957–2013), Norwegian bass guitarist
- Yngve Nordwall (1908–1994), Swedish film actor and director
- Per Yngve Ohlin (1969–1991), Lead singer of the black Metal band, Mayhem
- Yngve Pacius (1886–1962), Finnish sailor
- Sven Yngve Persson (born 1960), Swedish politician
- Bror Yngve Rahm (born 1955), Norwegian politician
- Yngve Rosqvist, Swedish footballer
- Yngve Sætre (born 1962), Norwegian record producer, musician
- Bror Yngve Sjöstedt (1866–1948), Swedish naturalist
- Yngve Sköld (1899–1992), Swedish composer and pianist
- Yngve Slettholm (born 1955), Norwegian politician and Salvationist
- Yngve Slyngstad (born 1962), CEO of Norges Bank Investment Management
- Yngve Edward Soderberg (1896–1972), American artist in Mystic, Connecticut
- Yngve Stiernspetz (1887–1945), Swedish gymnast
- Yngve Stoor (1912–1985), Swedish singer, lyricist and composer
- Yngve Viebke (1912–1988), Olympic horse rider
- Yngve Wahlander (born 1958), Swedish shot putter
- Sindre Yngve Walstad, Norwegian handball player
- Nils Yngve Wessell (1914–2007), American psychologist, president of Tufts University
- Yngve Wieland (born 1983), German singer-songwriter and musician
- Yngve Zotterman (1898–1982), Swedish neurophysiologist

== Surname ==
- John A. Yngve (1924–2019), American lawyer and politician
- Victor Yngve (1920–2012), American computational linguist
