= William Inge (disambiguation) =

William Inge (1913–1973) was an American playwright and novelist.

William Inge may also refer to:

- William Inge (judge) (c. 1260–1322), English attorney
- William Marshall Inge (1802–1846), American legislator and attorney
- William M. Inge (Mississippi politician) (1832-1900), American politician
- William Inge (American football) (born 1973), American football coach
- William Inge (priest, born 1829) (1829–1903), English priest, academic and cricketer
- William Ralph Inge (1860–1954), English priest, author and theologian (son of the above)
- Will Inge (William Walter Inge, 1907–1991), English cricketer
- William Inge (MP) (1669–1731), English Tory politician, scholar, and antiquary who represented Tamworth

== See also ==
- Inge, a given name
