= Yngve Johansson =

Yngve Johansson may refer to:

- Yngve Johansson (footballer)
- Yngve Johansson (ice hockey)
