= Ingar =

Male given name

- Gender: Male, Female

Origin
- Region of origin: Norway, Sweden

Ingar is a Norwegian masculine given name, as well as a Southern Swedish feminine given name.

== Notable people named Ingar ==
- Ingar Bratseth-Kiplesund (born 1996), Norwegian long jumper
- Ingar Dragset, part of the Elmgreen & Dragset artist duo
- Ingar Engum, Norwegian handball player
- Ingar Helge Gimle (born 1956), Norwegian actor
- Ingar Knudtsen (1944–2025), Norwegian novelist and poet
- Ingar Nielsen, Norwegian sailor
- Ingar Nordlund, Norwegian speed skater
- Ingar Pedersen (1898-1977), Norwegian footballer
- Ingar Pettersen (born 1946), Norwegian businessman
- Ingar Roggen (1934–2023), Spanish academic
- Ingar Sletten Kolloen (born 1951), Norwegian author and editor
- Ingar Solty (born 1979), German writer
- Ingar Zach (born 1971), Norwegian percussionist

== As a middle name ==
- Øystein Ingar Larsen (born 1941), Bishop of the Church of Norway

== See also ==
- Ingars
