= Ingars =

Male given name

- Gender: Male
- Name day: 1 July

Origin
- Region of origin: Latvia

Ingars is a Latvian masculine give name.

== Notable people named Ingars ==
- Ingars Dude (born 1987), Latvian handball player
- Ingars Stuglis (born 1996), Latvian footballer
- Ingars Viļums (born 1977), rock musician and bass player (Brainstorm)

== See also ==
- Ingar
