= 2022 Alamo Bowl =

Postseason college football bowl game

2022 Valero Alamo Bowl
- 30th Alamo Bowl
Texas Longhorns	Washington Huskies
(8–4)	(10–2)
Big 12	Pac-12
20	27
Head coach: Steve Sarkisian	Head coach: Kalen DeBoer
AP / Coaches / CFP; 21 / 21 / 20	AP / Coaches / CFP; 12 / 12 / 12
	1	2	3	4	Total
Texas	3	0	7	10	20
Washington	10	3	7	7	27
- Date: December 29, 2022
- Season: 2022
- Stadium: Alamodome
- Location: San Antonio, Texas
- MVP: Michael Penix Jr. (QB, Washington) & Bralen Trice (DE, Washington)
- Favorite: Texas by 3
- Referee: Gary Patterson (ACC)
- Attendance: 62,730
- Payout: US$8,252,740

United States TV coverage
- Network: ESPN
- Announcers: Tom Hart (play-by-play), Jordan Rodgers (analyst), and Cole Cubelic (sideline)

International TV coverage
- Network: ESPN Deportes

The 2022 Alamo Bowl was a college football bowl game held on December 29, 2022, at the Alamodome in San Antonio, Texas. The 30th annual Alamo Bowl, the game featured the Texas Longhorns from the Big 12 Conference and the Washington Huskies from the Pac-12 Conference. The game began at 8:10 p.m. CST and aired on ESPN. It was one of the 2022–23 bowl games concluding the 2022 FBS football season. Sponsored by Valero Energy, the game was officially known as the Valero Alamo Bowl.

== Teams ==
The game featured Texas from the Big 12 and Washington from the Pac-12. Both teams entered the bowl ranked in all major polls. This was the fifth meeting between the programs; entering the bowl, Texas led the all-time series, 3–1, as Washington's lone win came in the 1979 Sun Bowl.

=== Texas Longhorns ===
Texas played to a 8–4 regular-season record, 6–3 in conference play. They were ranked as high as No. 18 during the season. The Longhorns faced four ranked opponents, defeating Kansas State while losing to Alabama, Oklahoma State, and TCU. Texas entered the bowl 20th in the College Football Playoff (CFP) ranking.

=== Washington Huskies ===
Washington completed their regular season with a 10–2 record, 7–2 in conference play. Their only losses came in back-to-back contests against UCLA and Arizona State. The Huskies faced, and defeated, three ranked opponents: Michigan State, Oregon State, and Oregon. Washington entered the bowl 12th in the CFP ranking. They also had a chance to go to the Rose Bowl because if USC had won the Pac-12 Championship, it would’ve put the Trojans in the Playoff and sent the Huskies to Pasadena. But since Utah won and clenched the Pac—12’s automatic bid to the Rose Bowl, Washington was frozen out.

== Game summary ==
2022 Valero Alamo Bowl

Quarter	1	2	3	4	Total
No. 20 Texas	3	0	7	10	20
No. 12 Washington	10	3	7	7	27

at Alamodome • San Antonio, Texas

- Date: Thursday, December 29, 2022
- Game time: 8:00 p.m. CST
- Game weather: Indoor
- Game attendance: 62,730
- Referee: Gary Patterson
- TV announcers (ESPN): Tom Hart (play-by-play), Jordan Rodgers (analyst), and Cole Cubelic (sideline)
- Box score

Scoring summary

Quarter	Time	Drive			Team	Scoring information	Score	
Quarter	Time	Plays	Yards	TOP	Team	Scoring information	Texas	Washington
1st	11:44	4	1	0:56	WASH	46-yard field goal by Henry Peyton	0	3
1st	7:52	10	78	3:46	TEX	30-yard field goal by Bert Auburn	3	3
1st	3:17	10	88	4:30	WASH	Wayne Taulapapa 42-yard touchdown run, Henry Peyton kick good	3	10
2nd	0:00	16	74	4:50	WASH	23-yard field goal by Henry Peyton	3	13
3rd	12:31	7	75	2:29	TEX	Jonathon Brooks 34-yard touchdown reception from Quinn Ewers, Bert Auburn kick good	10	13
3rd	6:44	13	75	5:47	WASH	Taj Davis 6-yard touchdown reception from Michael Penix Jr., Henry Peyton kick good	10	20
4th	13:08	14	90	6:57	WASH	Jalen McMillan 8-yard touchdown reception from Michael Penix Jr., Henry Peyton kick good	10	27
4th	9:50	11	74	3:11	TEX	Jonathon Brooks 3-yard touchdown run, Bert Auburn kick good	17	27
4th	1:40	10	55	2:41	TEX	26-yard field goal by Bert Auburn	20	27
"TOP" = time of possession. For other American football terms, see Glossary of American football.							20	27

== Statistics ==
Team statistical comparison
Statistic	Texas	Washington
First downs	19	25
First downs rushing	2	9
First downs passing	16	16
First downs penalty	1	0
Third down efficiency	6–15	11–20
Fourth down efficiency	2–3	2–3
Total plays–net yards	65–420	83–445
Rushing attempts–net yards	18–51	28–158
Yards per rush	2.8	5.6
Yards passing	369	287
Pass completions–attempts	31–47	32–55
Interceptions thrown	0	1
Punt returns–total yards	1–0	0–0
Kickoff returns–total yards	2–40	1–12
Punts–average yardage	4–37.3	3–39.0
Fumbles–lost	0–0	0–0
Penalties–yards	6–45	7–45
Time of possession	24:14	35:46

Texas statistics
Longhorns passing
Player	C–A	Yds	TD–INT
Quinn Ewers	31–47	369	1–0
Longhorns rushing
Player	Car	Yds	TD
Keilan Robinson	8	27	0
Jonathon Brooks	6	18	1
Quinn Ewers	4	6	0
Longhorns receiving
Player	Rec	Yds	TD
Casey Cain	4	106	0
Xavier Worthy	7	84	0
Jonathon Brooks	2	37	1
Jordan Whittington	5	44	0
Keilan Robinson	6	42	0
Ja'Tavion Sanders	5	36	0
Gunnar Helm	1	19	0
Savion Red	1	1	0
Longhorns kicking
Player	FG-FGA	XP-XPA	LNG
Bert Auburn	2–2	2–2	30

Washington statistics
Huskies passing
Player	C–A	Yds	TD–INT
Michael Penix Jr.	32–54	287	2–1
Huskies rushing
Player	Car	Yds	TD
Wayne Taulapapa	14	108	1
Richard Newton	11	44	0
Michael Penix Jr.	3	6	0
Huskies receiving
Player	Rec	Yds	TD
Jalen McMillan	8	58	1
Rome Odunze	5	57	0
Ja'Lynn Polk	3	45	0
Taj Davis	4	32	1
Jack Westover	4	32	0
Devin Culp	4	29	0
Wayne Taulapapa	3	17	0
Quentin Moore	1	17	0
Huskies kicking
Player	FG-FGA	XP-XPA	LNG
Peyton Henry	2–2	3–3	46
