= 2011 South Dakota Coyotes football team =

American college football season

2011 South Dakota Coyotes football
- Conference: Great West Conference
- Record: 6–5 (2–2 Great West)
- Head coach: Ed Meierkort (8th season)
- Offensive coordinator: Wesley Beschorner (3rd season)
- Offensive scheme: Spread
- Defensive coordinator: Chuck Morrell (1st season)
- Base defense: 4–3
- Home stadium: DakotaDome

2011 Great West Conference football standings
	Conf.			Overall
Team	W		L	W		L
No. 23 North Dakota +	3	–	1	8	–	3
Cal Poly +	3	–	1	6	–	5
South Dakota	2	–	2	6	–	5
Southern Utah	1	–	3	6	–	5
UC Davis	1	–	3	4	–	7
+ – Conference co-champions; Rankings from The Sports Network poll

The 2011 South Dakota Coyotes football team represented the University of South Dakota in the 2011 NCAA Division I FCS football season. The Coyotes were led by eighth year head coach Ed Meierkort, played their home games at the DakotaDome, and they were members of the Great West Conference. This was South Dakota's final year as a member of the Great West as they became a member of The Summit League in 2012 and a football-only member of the Missouri Valley Football Conference

== Schedule ==
Date	Time	Opponent	Rank	Site	TV	Result	Attendance
September 3	1:00 p.m.	at Air Force*		Falcon Stadium; Colorado Springs, CO	The Mtn.	L 20–37	39,105
September 10	4:00 p.m.	No. 1 Eastern Washington*		DakotaDome; Vermillion, SD	Midco SN3	W 30–17	8,696
September 17	4:00 p.m.	Northwestern Oklahoma State*	No. 24	DakotaDome; Vermillion, SD		W 48–10	7,136
September 24	2:30 p.m.	at No. 7 (FBS) Wisconsin*	No. 18	Camp Randall Stadium; Madison, WI	BTN	L 10–59	78,880
October 1	4:00 p.m.	Lindenwood*	No. 21	DakotaDome; Vermillion, SD		W 30–0	7,293
October 8	4:00 p.m.	No. 22 Southern Utah^{†}	No. 18	DakotaDome; Vermillion, SD		W 24–19	10,169
October 15	3:00 p.m.	at Illinois State*	No. 15	Hancock Stadium; Normal, IL		L 3–28	10,014
October 22	4:00 p.m.	UC Davis	No. 25	DakotaDome; Vermillion, SD		W 27–24	8,263
October 29	8:00 p.m.	at Cal Poly	No. 17	Alex G. Spanos Stadium; San Luis Obispo, CA		L 24–27	10,557
November 15	4:00 p.m.	Missouri S&T*	No. 24	DakotaDome; Vermillion, SD	Midco SN3	W 48–14	6,896
November 19	1:00 p.m.	at North Dakota	No. 22	Alerus Center; Grand Forks, ND (Sitting Bull Trophy)	Midco SN3	L 37–38	7,400
*Non-conference game; ^{†}Homecoming; Rankings from The Sports Network Poll released prior to the game; All times are in Central time

== Roster ==
2011 South Dakota Coyotes football team roster
Players
Coaches
Offense

Pos.	#	Name	Class
WR	1	Dustin Nowotny	Sr
QB	2	Dante Warren	Sr
WR	3	Anthony Williams	So
WR	4	Terrance Terry	Fr
WR	5	Jeremy Blount	Sr
WR	10	Alex Litzen	Fr
QB	13	Nick Meyer	Fr
QB	14	Kevin Earl	Fr
TE	15	Tyler Wilhelm	So
QB	16	Josh Vander Maten	Fr
WR	17	Will Powell	Jr
QB	18	Kyle Cichos	So
RB	20	Chris Ganious	Sr
RB	22	Noah Pearl	Fr
RB	27	Earv Archambeau	So
RB	28	Michael Burrus	So
RB	32	Marcus Sims	Jr
FB	34	Tom Manning	So
FB	36	Erik Helland	Sr
FB	46	Eric Aas	Sr
OL	60	Broc Gullett	Sr
OL	63	Bryan Campos	Fr
OL	64	Brent Johnson	Sr
OL	65	Derek Chancellor	Fr
OL	66	Steve Nelson	So
OL	67	Cody O'Neill	So
OL	69	Tim Ross	Jr
OL	70	Matt Huffer	So
OL	71	Colton Kunde	So
OL	72	Andrew Schofield	So
OL	73	Adam Praska	So
OL	74	Matt Porisch	Sr
OL	75	Chris Kruse	Fr
OL	76	Tom Compton	Sr
OL	77	Marc Murtha	So
OL	78	R.J. Polley	Sr
OL	79	Nick Olson	Fr
WR	80	Khiry McDonald	So
WR	81	Brian Griffin	So
WR	83	Austin Koch	So
TE	84	Jay Burns	Jr
TE	85	Michael Neilson	Sr
TE	86	Joel Dejongh	Jr
FB	87	Quintin McMartin	Jr
TE	89	Kayl Barkley	Fr
TE	93	Ethan Pace	Fr

Defense

Pos.	#	Name	Class
DB	6	Dametrius Turner	So
DB	7	Chris Frierson	So
DB	8	Shane Potter	Sr
DB	9	Jim Thompson	Sr
DB	10	Marquis Butler	Sr
DL	11	Tyler Starr	So
DB	12	Alphonso Valdez	Jr
DB	19	Charlie Goro	So
DB	21	Dion Price	Sr
DB	23	Isaac Fairbairn	Fr
DB	24	Chris Lundy	So
LB	25	Tim Marlette	Jr
DB	26	Aaron Swift	So
LB	29	Andrew Meier	Sr
DB	30	Judas Smith	Fr
DB	33	Justin Wohlert	Fr
DB	35	Matt Lupkes	Fr
LB	37	Zack Wilson	Jr
LB	38	Ryan Hillier	Fr
LB	39	Kyle Wheeler	Sr
LB	41	Kyle Shanker	Jr
LB	42	Shea Williams	Sr
LB	43	Darius Hogans	Jr
LB	44	Adam Broders	Sr
LB	45	Kelan Richardson	So
DL	47	Chase Irvin-Salazar	So
LB	49	Jerrod Freidel	So
LB	50	Tyler Richardson	Fr
DE	51	Sidney Bazemore	Sr
LB	52	D'Angelo Butler	Jr
LB	53	Colin Buscarini	Fr
LB	54	Kyle Guziec	So
OLB	55	Vladimir Gray	Fr
DL	56	Nick Jacobs	Fr
LB	57	Mike Garvey	Jr
DL	58	Reggie Johnson	Fr
LB	59	Nikorey Benyard	Fr
DL	61	Trayvis Peters	Fr
DL	90	Mike Pharis	So
DL	91	David Giese	Jr
DL	92	Jordan Eaton	Jr
DL	93	Evan Capper	Sr
DL	94	Drew Iddings	Fr
DL	95	Kenny Greer	So
DL	96	Jesse Weisbrod	Sr
DL	97	Emanuel Cromuel	Fr
DL	98	Taylor Moore	So
DL	99	Donny Fortes	Jr

Special teams

Pos.	#	Name	Class
K	48	Kevin Robb	So
LS	62	Walter Reed	Jr
P	82	Cole Zwiefelhofer	Jr

Head coach

- Ed Meierkort

Coordinators/assistant coaches

- Wesley Beschorner – Offensive coordinator
- Chuck Morrell – Defensive coordinator
- Jake Sprague – Special teams coordinator/defensive line
- Jake Breske – Running backs/graduate assistant
- Tim Tripplett – Wide receivers
- Collin Prosser – Tight ends/graduate assistant
- Tony Spencer – Offensive line
- Adam Breske – Co-linebackers
- B.J. Campbell – Co-linebackers/graduate assistant
- Nick Bendetto – Defensive backs/graduate assistant
- Jevon Bowman – Strength & conditioning

Legend

- (C) Team captain
- (S) Suspended
- (I) Ineligible
- Injured
- Redshirt

Roster
Last update: December 3, 2023
