= Ingunn =

Ingunn is a given name. Notable people with the given name include:

- Ingunn Arnórsdóttir (12th century), Icelandic scholar
- Ingunn Bollerud (born 1972), Norwegian cyclist
- Ingunn Thomassen Berg, Norwegian handball player
- Ingunn Foss (born 1960), Norwegian politician
- Ingunn Gjerstad (born 1963), Norwegian politician
- Ingunn Ringvold (born 1979), Norwegian singer, musician and songwriter
- Ingunn Hultgreen Weltzien (born 1986), Norwegian orienteering competitor and cross-country skier
