= Ingar Pedersen =

Norwegian footballer (1898-1977)

Personal information
- Date of birth: 1 March 1898
- Date of death: 10 March 1977 (aged 79)

International career
Years	Team	Apps	(Gls)
1927–1928	Norway	6	(0)

Ingar Pedersen (1 March 1898 – 10 March 1977) was a Norwegian footballer. He played in six matches for the Norway national football team from 1927 to 1928.
