= Ed Meierkort =

American football coach (born 1959)

Biographical details
- Born: March 24, 1959 (age 67)

Coaching career (HC unless noted)

Football
- c. 1981: Dakota Wesleyan (assistant)
- c. 1982: South Dakota State (GA)
- 1983–1992: Southwest Minnesota State (assistant)
- 1993–2003: Wisconsin–Stout
- 2004–2011: South Dakota
- 2012: Celebration HS (FL)

Baseball
- 1981: Dakota Wesleyan

Head coaching record
- Overall: 108–89 (football); 1–16 (baseball)
- Tournaments: Football; 0–1 (NCAA D-III playoffs); 1–1(NCAA D-II playoffs)

Accomplishments and honors

Championships
- Football; 1 WIAC (2000); 1 NCC (2005)

Ed Meierkort (born March 24, 1959) is an American football coach. He served as the head football coach at the University of Wisconsin–Stout from 1993 to 2003 and University of South Dakota from 2004 to 2011, compiling a career college football coaching record of 108–89.

== Career ==
Meierkort began his coaching career at Dakota Wesleyan, where he also served as head baseball coach. From there he served as a graduate assistant at South Dakota State before moving on to Southwest Minnesota State University, where he held various positions from 1983 to 1992.

He began his head football coaching career at the University of Wisconsin–Stout in 1993. During his tenure there, he coached 16 All-Americans and two future NFL players. In 2000, the team achieved a #5 national ranking. That year, Meierkort was named Wisconsin Intercollegiate Athletic Conference and AFCA Region 5 Coach of the Year and was a finalist for AFCA National Coach of the Year.

Meierkort was named head coach of the Coyotes of the University of South Dakota in 2004. He oversaw the program's elevation from the NCAA Division II level to Football Championship Subdivision (FCS). The team's first victory against a Division I opponent came against the Southern Utah Thunderbirds of the on November 15, 2008. In 2010, the program achieved its first win against an NCAA Division I Football Bowl Subdivision (FBS) opponent with a victory over the Minnesota Golden Gophers.

South Dakota fired Meierkort following the 2011 season. He took over the football program at Celebration High School in Celebration, Florida, for one year, but was fired after a disappointing 2012 season, during which the team went winless.

== Education and family ==
A native of Chicago, Illinois, Meierkort is a graduate of South Dakota State University and Dakota Wesleyan University. He is married with two children.

== Head coaching record ==
=== Football ===
Year	Team	Overall	Conference	Standing	Bowl/playoffs	NCAA^{#}
Wisconsin–Stout Blue Devils (Wisconsin State University / Wisconsin Intercollegiate Athletic Conference) (1993–2003)
1993	Wisconsin–Stout	2–8	1–6	T–7th		
1994	Wisconsin–Stout	4–7	2–5	6th		
1995	Wisconsin–Stout	3–7	1–6	7th		
1996	Wisconsin–Stout	4–6	1–6	7th		
1997	Wisconsin–Stout	6–4	5–2	T–2nd		
1998	Wisconsin–Stout	5–5	3–4	6th		
1999	Wisconsin–Stout	2–8	1–6	6th		
2000	Wisconsin–Stout	10–1	7–0	1st	L NCAA Division III First Round	
2001	Wisconsin–Stout	6–3	4–3	T–3rd		
2002	Wisconsin–Stout	7–3	4–3	T–3rd		
2003	Wisconsin–Stout	6–4	4–3	T–4th		
Wisconsin–Stout:		55–55	33–44			
South Dakota Coyotes (North Central Conference) (2004–2007)
2004	South Dakota	9–2	4–2	T–2nd		16
2005	South Dakota	9–2	4–2	T–1st		17
2006	South Dakota	9–3	6–2	3rd	L NCAA Division II Second Round	13
2007	South Dakota	6–5	5–3	4th		
South Dakota Coyotes (Great West Football Conference) (2008–2011)
2008	South Dakota	6–5	1–2	T–3rd		
2009	South Dakota	5–5	2–2	T–2nd		
2010	South Dakota	3–7	1–3	4th		
2011	South Dakota	6–5	2–2	3rd		
South Dakota:		53–34	25–128			
Total:		108–89				
National championship Conference title Conference division title or championship game berth
