= Inge Bell =

German opinion journalist and film producer

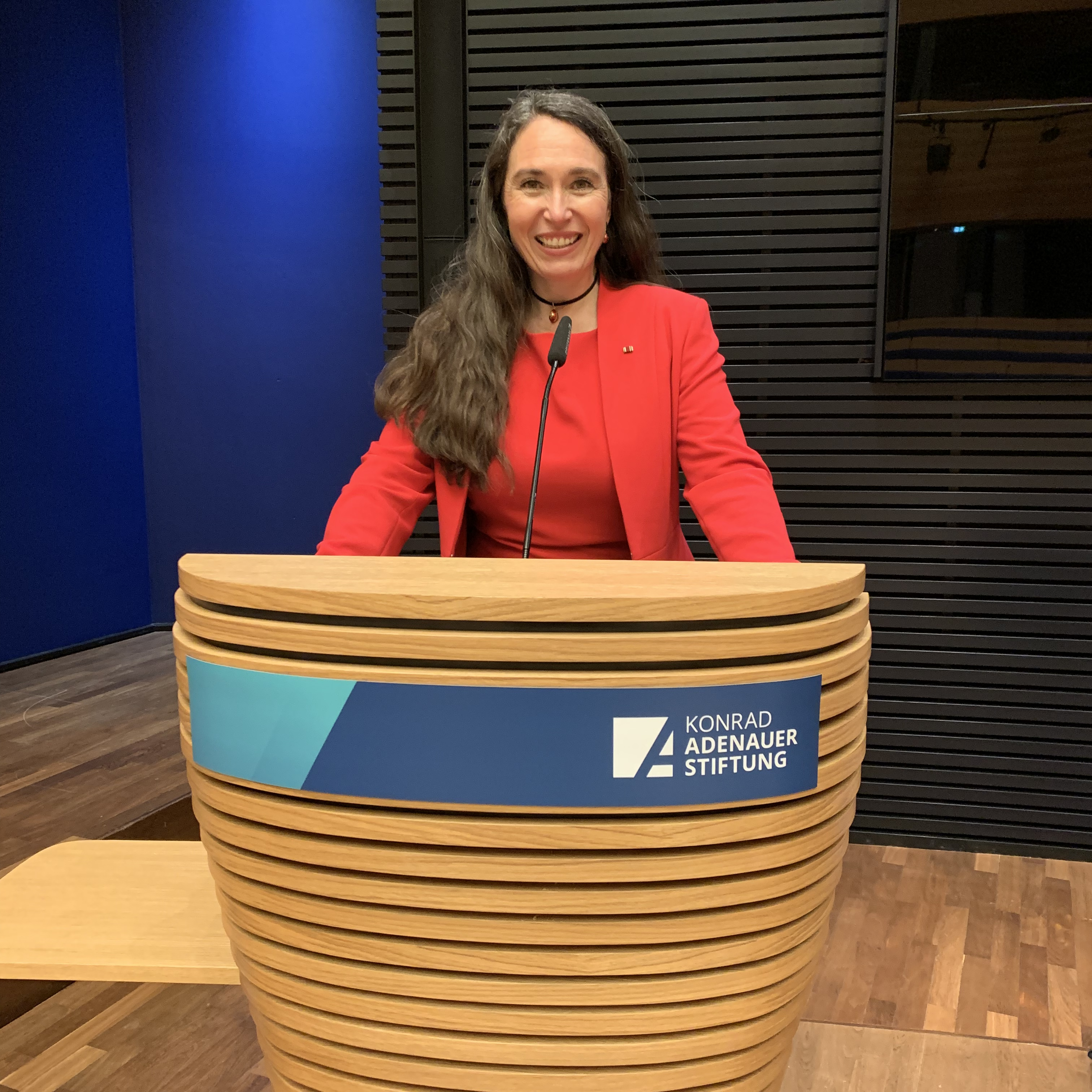
Image of Inge Bell Berlin

Inge Bell (born 28 August 1967) is a German human rights activist, business consultant and entrepreneur. Until June 2023, she was the second chairwoman of the women's rights organisation Terre des Femmes and, until July 2022, the Bavarian representative of the aid organisation Solwodi. Since May 2022, Inge Bell has been the 1st Chairwoman of the German Institute for Applied Crime Analysis (DIAKA).

== Early life and education ==
Born in Brașov (Kronstadt), in the Socialist Republic of Romania, Inge Bell spent her early childhood in Sighișoara (Schäßburg). After her family fled to Germany, she grew up in Munich from 1971. She studied linguistics and literature.

== Career ==
From 1997 to 2010, she worked for ARD. On behalf of NDR, she filmed a multi-part reportage about a Bulgarian home for disabled girls and women for Weltspiegel from 2000 to 2003. The first report was broadcast in April 2000 on ARD-Weltspiegel under the title Banished, forgotten, deported - The girls of Malko Scharkovo.

This broadcast prompted the regional director of the Landschaftsverband Rheinland (LVR) Ferdinand Esser to make the first foreign commitment of the LVR in its history, which led to the founding of the Verein zur Förderung von Einrichtungen für Behinderte im Ausland e. V., which has since supported the home with financial and material donations. The second part of Inge Bell's report, Bulgaria: The Home for the Disabled at the End of Europe, was broadcast on Weltspiegel in May 2005.

From 2006, Inge Bell began working freelance as a media and communications trainer. In 2012, she founded a company that produces videos for communications training. Together with Stefan Baumgarth, she is the developer and publisher of the "Eniqma Edition" training method.

In 2014, Bell joined the management of Kubon & Sagner. In 2016, she founded Bell & Baumgarth GmbH as a holding company with her former business partner and current husband Stefan Baumgarth. Alongside Bell Media GmbH, Bridgehouse Bell GmbH and Biblion Media GmbH, Kubon & Sagner Media GmbH became a wholly owned subsidiary of the holding company. Kubon & Sagner Media GmbH filed for insolvency in 2017. Inge Bell is active in various associations and organisations throughout Europe as a member and speaker on prostitution and human trafficking.

In 2022, Inge Bell founded the German Institute for Applied Crime Analysis (DIAKA) in Munich together with political, criminal investigation, and law experts, aid organisations, human rights organisations, associations of trafficked persons, business and the media.

== Awards ==
- 2007: Prize Women of Europe - Germany of the European Movement Germany.
- 2012: Federal Cross of Merit on Ribbon
