= 2011 North Dakota Fighting Sioux football team =

American college football season

2011 North Dakota Fighting Sioux football

GWC co-champion
- Conference: Great West Conference

Ranking
- Sports Network: No. 23
- Record: 8–3 (3–1 GWC)
- Head coach: Chris Mussman (4th season)
- Offensive coordinator: Greg Breitbach (4th season)
- Co-defensive coordinators: John Kelling (6th season); Mike Mannausau (6th season)
- Home stadium: Alerus Center

2011 Great West Conference football standings
	Conf.			Overall
Team	W		L	W		L
No. 23 North Dakota +	3	–	1	8	–	3
Cal Poly +	3	–	1	6	–	5
South Dakota	2	–	2	6	–	5
Southern Utah	1	–	3	6	–	5
UC Davis	1	–	3	4	–	7
+ – Conference co-champions; Rankings from The Sports Network poll

The 2011 North Dakota Fighting Sioux football team represented the University of North Dakota as a member of the Great West Conference (GWC) during the 2011 NCAA Division I FCS football season. Led by fourth-year head coach Chris Mussman, the Fighting Sioux compiled an overall record of 8–3 with a mark of 3–1 in conference play, sharing the GWC title with Cal Poly. North Dakota played home games at the Alerus Center in Grand Forks, North Dakota. This was the team's final year as a member of the Great West Conference as North Dakota became a full member of the Big Sky Conference in 2012.

== Schedule ==
Date	Time	Opponent	Rank	Site	TV	Result	Attendance
September 1	7:00 pm	Drake*		Alerus Center; Grand Forks, ND	FSSN/FCS Central	W 16–0	8,484
September 10	4:00 pm	at Idaho*		Kibbie Dome; Moscow, ID	SWX Right Now	L 14–44	10,608
September 17	9:00 pm	at Fresno State*		Bulldog Stadium; Fresno, CA	ESPN3	L 22–27	17,238
September 24	6:00 pm	Black Hills State*		Alerus Center; Grand Forks, ND		W 53–19	8,545
October 1	2:00 pm	at No. 17 Southern Utah		Eccles Coliseum; Cedar City, UT	KMYU	W 26–20	4,987
October 8	1:00 pm	Montana Western*		Alerus Center; Grand Forks, ND		W 42–9	6,407
October 22	1:00 pm	Cal Poly^{†}	No. 20	Alerus Center; Grand Forks, ND	FSSN/FCS Central	L 19–23	9,930
October 29	2:30 pm	at Northern Colorado*		Nottingham Field; Greeley, CO	Big Sky TV	W 27–25	3,171
November 5	1:00 pm	Sioux Falls*		Alerus Center; Grand Forks, ND		W 15–13	6,279
November 12	4:00 pm	at UC Davis		Aggie Stadium; Davis, CA		W 14–7	7,726
November 19	1:00 pm	No. 22 South Dakota		Alerus Center; Grand Forks, ND	FSSN/FCS	W 38–37	7,400
*Non-conference game; ^{†}Homecoming; Rankings from The Sports Network Poll released prior to the game; All times are in Central time
