= 2011 Southern Utah Thunderbirds football team =

American college football season

2011 Southern Utah Thunderbirds football
- Conference: Great West Conference
- Record: 6–5 (1–3 Great West)
- Head coach: Ed Lamb (4th season)
- Offensive coordinator: Steve Clark (4th season)
- Defensive coordinator: Justin Ena (2nd season)
- Home stadium: Eccles Coliseum

2011 Great West Conference football standings
	Conf.			Overall
Team	W		L	W		L
No. 23 North Dakota +	3	–	1	8	–	3
Cal Poly +	3	–	1	6	–	5
South Dakota	2	–	2	6	–	5
Southern Utah	1	–	3	6	–	5
UC Davis	1	–	3	4	–	7
+ – Conference co-champions; Rankings from The Sports Network poll

The 2011 Southern Utah Thunderbirds football team represented Southern Utah University as a member of the Great West Conference during the 2011 NCAA Division I FCS football season. The Thunderbirds were led by fourth-year head coach Ed Lamb and played their home games at Eccles Coliseum. Southern Utah compiled an overall record of 6–5 with a mark of 1–3 in conference play, tying for fourth place in the Great West. The Thunderbirds beat UNLV of the NCAA Division I Football Bowl Subdivision (FBS) on September 24, which was program's second ever against a I-A/FBS. They beat Arkansas State in 1997.

This was Southern Utah's final year as a member of the Great West as they became a full member of the Big Sky Conference in 2012.

== Schedule ==
Date	Time	Opponent	Rank	Site	TV	Result	Attendance
September 3	5:00 pm	at South Dakota State*		Coughlin–Alumni Stadium; Brookings, SD		L 28–29	10,113
September 10	1:00 pm	No. 12 Sacramento State*		Eccles Coliseum; Cedar City, UT	KMYU	W 35–14	6,238
September 17	6:00 pm	UTSA*^{†}		Eccles Coliseum; Cedar City, UT	KMYU	W 45–22	8,683
September 24	7:00 pm	at UNLV*	No. 23	Sam Boyd Stadium; Paradise, NV	The Mtn.	W 41–16	18,102
October 1	1:00 pm	North Dakota	No. 17	Eccles Coliseum; Cedar City, UT	KMYU	L 20–26	4,987
October 8	3:00 pm	at No. 18 South Dakota	No. 22	DakotaDome; Vermillion, SD		L 19–24	10,169
October 15	7:00 pm	at Cal Poly		Alex G. Spanos Stadium; San Luis Obispo, CA	KSBY	L 27–31	8,232
October 22	4:00 pm	at Weber State*		Stewart Stadium; Ogden, UT		W 35–28	8,657
October 29	1:00 pm	UC Davis		Eccles Coliseum; Cedar City, UT	KMYU	W 34–3	6,602
November 12	5:00 pm	at No. 5 Northern Iowa*		UNI-Dome; Cedar Falls, IA		L 21–34	12,480
November 19	3:00 pm	at Northern Arizona*		Walkup Skydome; Flagstaff, AZ (rivalry)	NAU-TV/FCSP	W 27–24	4,398
*Non-conference game; ^{†}Homecoming; Rankings from The Sports Network Poll released prior to the game; All times are in Mountain time
