= 2011 Cal Poly Mustangs football team =

American college football season

2011 Cal Poly Mustangs football

GWC co-champion
- Conference: Great West Conference
- Record: 6–5 (3–1 GWC)
- Head coach: Tim Walsh (3rd season)
- Co-offensive coordinators: Brian Cook (3rd season); Saga Tuitele (3rd season)
- Offensive scheme: Triple option
- Defensive coordinator: Greg Lupfer (3rd season)
- Base defense: 3–4
- Home stadium: Alex G. Spanos Stadium

2011 Great West Conference football standings
	Conf.			Overall
Team	W		L	W		L
No. 23 North Dakota +	3	–	1	8	–	3
Cal Poly +	3	–	1	6	–	5
South Dakota	2	–	2	6	–	5
Southern Utah	1	–	3	6	–	5
UC Davis	1	–	3	4	–	7
+ – Conference co-champions; Rankings from The Sports Network poll

The 2011 Cal Poly Mustangs football team represented California Polytechnic State University, San Luis Obispo as member of the Great West Conference (GWC) during the 2011 NCAA Division I FCS football season. Led by third-year head coach Tim Walsh, Cal Poly compiled an overall record of 6–5 with a mark of 3–1 in conference play, sharing the GWC with North Dakota. The Mustangs played home games at Alex G. Spanos Stadium in San Luis Obispo, California.

With a win over South Dakota on October 29, Cal Poly clinched a share of the conference championship, the program's fourth conference title since the GWC's creation in 2004. The Mustangs became a football-only member of the Big Sky Conference in 2012.

== Schedule ==
Date	Time	Opponent	Site	TV	Result	Attendance
September 3	7:00 p.m.	at San Diego State*	Qualcomm Stadium; San Diego, CA	The Mtn.	L 21–49	34,384
September 10	12:05 p.m.	at No. 15 Montana*	Washington–Grizzly Stadium; Missoula, MT	KSBY, West Montana CW	L 23–37	25,855
September 17	4:05 p.m.	South Dakota State*	Alex G. Spanos Stadium; San Luis Obispo, CA		W 48–14	11,075
September 24	12:30 p.m.	at Northern Illinois*	Huskie Stadium; DeKalb, IL		L 30–47	14,321
October 8	4:05 p.m.	Central Oklahoma*	Alex G. Spanos Stadium; San Luis Obispo, CA		W 44–25	7,426
October 15	6:05 p.m.	Southern Utah^{†}	Alex G. Spanos Stadium; San Luis Obispo, CA	KSBY	W 31–27	8,232
October 22	11:00 a.m.	at No. 20 North Dakota	Alerus Center; Grand Forks, ND	FSSN, FCS	W 23–19	9,930
October 29	6:05 p.m.	No. 17 South Dakota	Alex G. Spanos Stadium; San Luis Obispo, CA	KSBY	W 27–24	10,557
November 5	6:05 p.m.	at UC Davis	Aggie Stadium; Davis, CA (Battle for the Golden Horseshoe)		L 17–24	9,460
November 12	6:05 p.m.	Eastern Washington*	Alex G. Spanos Stadium; San Luis Obispo, CA	KSBY	L 51–53 ^{3OT}	6,562
November 19	2:00 p.m.	at South Alabama*	Ladd–Peebles Stadium; Mobile, AL	WJTC, ESPN3	W 41–10	18,279
*Non-conference game; ^{†}Homecoming; Rankings from The Sports Network Poll released prior to the game; All times are in Pacific time

== Game summaries ==
	1	2	3	4	Total
Mustangs	0	14	0	7	21
Aztecs	14	14	7	14	49

	1	2	3	4	Total
Mustangs	10	7	6	0	23
#15 Grizzlies	7	7	15	8	37

	1	2	3	4	Total
Jackrabbits	7	0	7	0	14
Mustangs	7	20	14	7	48

	1	2	3	4	Total
Mustangs	0	7	10	13	30
Huskies	13	21	0	13	47

	1	2	3	4	Total
Bronchos	10	9	0	6	25
Mustangs	10	0	14	20	44

	1	2	3	4	Total
Thunderbirds	7	10	0	10	27
Mustangs	3	7	7	14	31

	1	2	3	4	Total
Mustangs	3	13	7	0	23
#20 Fighting Sioux	6	0	3	10	19

	1	2	3	4	Total
#17 Coyotes	3	14	0	7	24
Mustangs	0	0	10	17	27

	1	2	3	4	Total
Mustangs					0
Aggies					0

	1	2	3	4	Total
Eagles					0
Mustangs					0

	1	2	3	4	Total
Mustangs					0
Jaguars					0
