= Ingunn Thomassen Berg =

Norwegian handball player (born 1961)

Personal information
- Nationality: Norwegian
- Born: 21 September 1961 (age 65)

Sport
- Sport: Handball
- Position: Wing

Senior clubs
- Years: Team
- 1977–1992: Kraby/Starum-73
National team
Years	Team	Apps	(Gls)
1979–1985	Norway	122	(249)

Ingunn Thomassen Berg (born 21 September 1961) is a Norwegian handball player. She played over 120 matches for the Norway women's national handball team from 1979 to 1985. She participated at the 1982 World Women's Handball Championship, where the Norwegian team placed seventh. She played for Kraby/Starum-73 from 1977 to 1992.

She was awarded the Håndballstatuetten trophy from the Norwegian Handball Federation in 1999.
