= 2011 UC Davis Aggies football team =

American college football season

2011 UC Davis Aggies football
- Conference: Great West Conference
- Record: 4–7 (1–3 GWC)
- Head coach: Bob Biggs (19th season)
- Defensive coordinator: Mark Johnson (3rd season)
- Home stadium: Aggie Stadium

2011 Great West Conference football standings
| | Conf. | | | Overall |
| Team | W | | L | W | | L |
|---|---|---|---|---|---|---|
| No. 23 North Dakota + | 3 | – | 1 | 8 | – | 3 |
| Cal Poly + | 3 | – | 1 | 6 | – | 5 |
| South Dakota | 2 | – | 2 | 6 | – | 5 |
| Southern Utah | 1 | – | 3 | 6 | – | 5 |
| UC Davis | 1 | – | 3 | 4 | – | 7 |
+ – Conference co-champions; Rankings from The Sports Network poll

The 2011 UC Davis football team represented the University of California, Davis as a member of the Great West Conference (GWC) during the 2011 NCAA Division I FCS football season. Led by 19th-year head coach Bob Biggs, UC Davis compiled an overall record of 4–7 with a mark of 1–3 in conference play, tying for fourth place in the GWC. The Aggies played home games at Aggie Stadium in Davis, California.

This was UC Davis' final year as a member of the GWC as they became a member of the Big Sky Conference in 2012.

== Schedule ==
| Date | Time | Opponent | Site | TV | Result | Attendance |
|---|---|---|---|---|---|---|
| September 1 | 7:00 pm | at Arizona State* | Sun Devil Stadium; Tempe, AZ | | L 14–48 | 45,671 |
| September 10 | 12:00 pm | at No. 6 Montana State* | Bobcat Stadium; Bozeman, MT | Max Media | L 14–38 | 18,487 |
| September 17 | 6:00 pm | San Diego* | Aggie Stadium; Davis, CA | | W 31–3 | 10,129 |
| September 24 | 9:00 pm | at Hawaii* | Aloha Stadium; Halawa, HI | Oceanic Time Warner Cable PPV | L 14–56 | 30,756 |
| October 8 | 6:00 pm | No. 24 (D-II) Humboldt State* | Aggie Stadium; Davis, CA | | L 17–23 | 9,770 |
| October 15 | 2:00 pm | UTSA* | Aggie Stadium; Davis, CA | | W 38–17 | 8,876 |
| October 22 | 2:00 pm | at No. 25 South Dakota | DakotaDome; Vermillion, SD | | L 24–27 | 8,236 |
| October 29 | 12:00 pm | at Southern Utah | Eccles Coliseum; Cedar City, UT | KMYU | L 3–34 | 6,602 |
| November 5 | 2:00 pm | Cal Poly | Aggie Stadium; Davis, CA | | W 24–17 | 9,460 |
| November 12 | 2:00 pm | North Dakota | Aggie Stadium; Davis, CA | | L 7–14 | 7,726 |
| November 19 | 2:00 pm | at Sacramento State* | Hornet Stadium; Sacramento, CA (Causeway Classic) | CSNCA | W 23–19 | 12,874 |
*Non-conference game; Rankings from The Sports Network Poll released prior to the game; All times are in Pacific time
