= Chuck Morrell =

American football player and coach (born 1974/75)

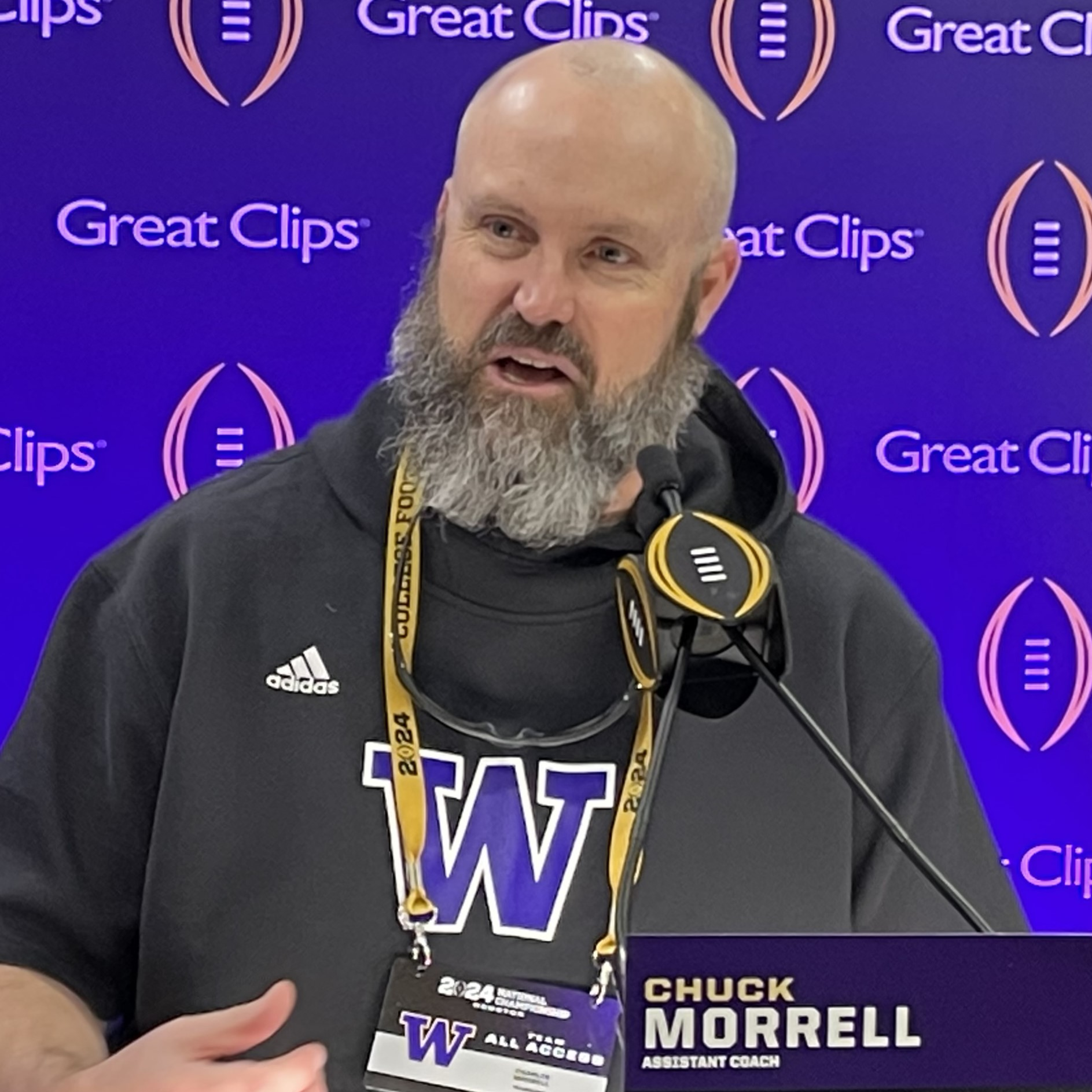
- Morrell talking to press ahead of the 2024 CFP National Championship.

Current position
- Title: Inside linebackers coach
- Team: Alabama
- Conference: SEC

Biographical details
- Born: 1974 or 1975 (age 50–51); Tyndall, South Dakota, U.S.

Playing career
- 1995–1997: Sioux Falls
- Position: Safety

Coaching career (HC unless noted)
- 1998: Sioux Falls (DB)
- 1999–2009: Sioux Falls (DC)
- 2010: South Dakota (DC)
- 2011–2019: Montana Tech
- 2020–2021: Fresno State (S)
- 2022–2023: Washington (co-DC/S)
- 2024: Alabama (analyst)
- 2025–present: Alabama (ILB)

Administrative career (AD unless noted)
- 2014–2017: Montana Tech

Head coaching record
- Overall: 52–44

Accomplishments and honors

Awards
- 3× Frontier Conference Coach of the Year

Chuck Morrell (born 1974 or 1975) is an American college football coach. He is the inside linebackers coach at the University of Alabama, a position he has held since 2024. He was the co-defensive coordinator and safeties coach at the University of Washington from 2022–2023. He was the safeties coach at Fresno State from 2020 to 2021. Before that, he spent nine years as the head coach for Montana Tech. He attended Sioux Falls, was part of Kalen DeBoer's coaching staff during a five-year run in which Sioux Falls won three NAIA football national championships.

== Playing career ==
Morrell grew up in Tyndall, South Dakota and attended Bon Homme High School. His father, Russ Morrell, was the long-time head football coach and one of the winningest coaches in South Dakota high school history. He was recruited out of high school by University of Sioux Falls head coach Bob Young, but initially attended the University of South Dakota before transferring to Sioux Falls. His undergraduate track was pre-medical, and he planned to become a doctor.

Morrell played safety for the Sioux Falls Cougars from 1995 through 1997. The 1996 team won the NAIA Division II football national championship, the final such title before the NAIA eliminated divisions. Morrell led his team in tackles that year. Among his teammates in those years was Kalen DeBoer, then a wide receiver.

== Coaching career ==
Morrell graduated from Sioux Falls in 1998 and Bob Young offered him a position on his staff as a defensive assistant. After one year, Young promoted him to defensive coordinator. DeBoer, after a stint as a high school coach, joined the staff as offensive coordinator in 2000. When Young retired after the 2004 season, DeBoer succeeded him. According to Morrell, he was offered the opportunity but declined, believing DeBoer was better suited to the role. Morrell continued as defensive coordinator. Over the next five years the Cougars appeared in the playoffs every year, won three NAIA football national championships, and lost a fourth. Morell resigned after the 2009 season to become defensive coordinator at South Dakota. DeBoer left a few weeks later to become offensive coordinator at Southern Illinois.

South Dakota was then a member of the Great West Conference, part of the NCAA Division I Football Championship Subdivision. Head coach Ed Meierkort, in the role since 2004, was in his second-to-last season. Morrell spent only one year there before accepting the head coaching job at Montana Tech, an NAIA school. Morrell succeeded Bob Green, who retired after 24 seasons.

Morrell would serve as head coach from 2011 through 2019, compiling an overall record of 52–44. Highlights of his tenure included three appearances in the NAIA playoffs, though Montana Tech never advanced beyond the quarterfinals. He was named the Frontier Conference Coach of the Year three times. Morrell was lured away from Butte, Montana, when Kalen DeBoer, the newly appointed head coach of Fresno State, offered him the position of defensive backs coach. Morrell commented at the time that "there's only one or two people in the entire world that I would leave Montana Tech to go work for." When DeBoer departed after the 2021 season to become head coach at University of Washington, Morrell went with him as co-defensive coordinator (with William Inge) and safeties coach. Jedd Fisch succeeded DeBoer as head coach following the 2023 season, and Fisch hired Stephen Belichick as his defensive coordinator. Morell would later join DeBoer at the University of Alabama in an analyst role.

== Personal life ==
Morrell married Jen Van Ballegooyen, a fellow Sioux Falls graduate, in 2001. They have two daughters.

== Head coaching record ==
Year	Team	Overall	Conference	Standing	Bowl/playoffs	NAIA^{#}
Montana Tech Orediggers (Frontier Conference) (2011–2019)
2011	Montana Tech	3–8	2–8	5th		
2012	Montana Tech	8–3	8–2	T–1st	L NAIA first round	12
2013	Montana Tech	3–7	3–7	7th		
2014	Montana Tech	1–9	1–9	8th		
2015	Montana Tech	10–2	9–1	1st	L NAIA quarterfinal	7
2016	Montana Tech	10–2	9–1	1st	L NAIA quarterfinal	7
2017	Montana Tech	6–4	6–4	2nd		
2018	Montana Tech	5–5	5–5	6th		
2019	Montana Tech	6–4	6–4	4th		
Montana Tech:		52–44	49–43			
Total:		52–44				
National championship Conference title Conference division title or championship game berth
