= William Inge (American football) =

American football player and coach (born 1973)

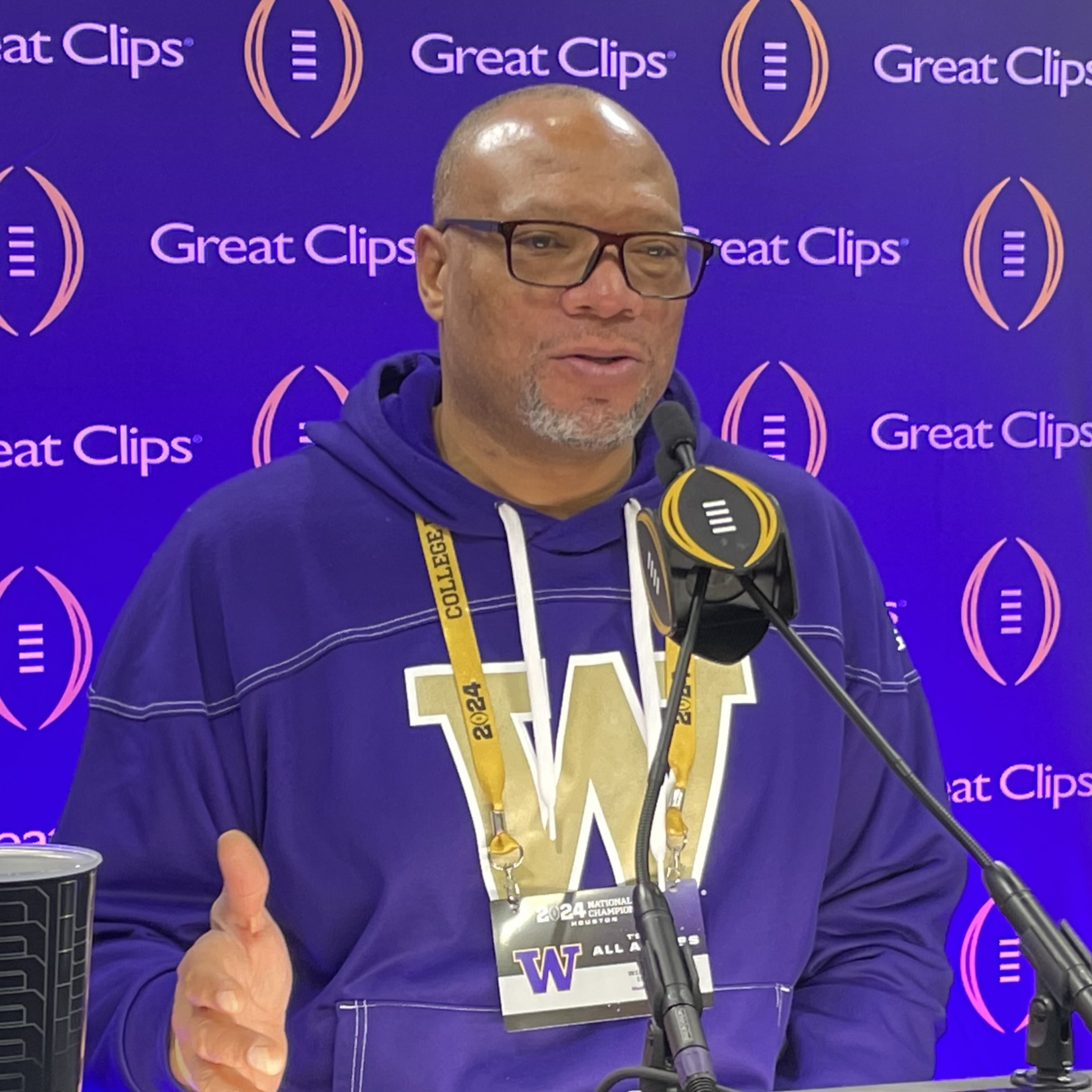
- Inge talking to press ahead of the 2024 CFP National Championship.

Current position
- Title: Linebackers coach
- Team: Tennessee
- Conference: SEC

Biographical details
- Born: December 17, 1973 (age 52); Kirkwood, Missouri

Playing career
- 1993–1996: Iowa
- 1997: Tennessee Titans
- Position: Defensive end

Coaching career (HC unless noted)
- 1998–2000: Iowa (GA/Recruiting coordinator)
- 2001–2002: Northern Iowa (LB)
- 2003: Northern Iowa (DL)
- 2004: Northern Iowa (co-DC/ST)
- 2005: Colorado (DL)
- 2006–2007: San Diego State (LB)
- 2008–2009: Cincinnati (LB)
- 2010–2011: Buffalo (DC/LB)
- 2012: Buffalo Bills (assistant DL)
- 2013–2015: Indiana (co-DC/LB)
- 2016: Indiana (ST/LB)
- 2017: Indiana (LB)
- 2018–2019: Indiana (ST)
- 2020–2021: Fresno State (DC/LB)
- 2022–2023: Washington (AHC/co-DC/LB)
- 2024–present: Tennessee (LB)

William D. Inge (born December 17, 1973), also known as Bill Ennis-Inge, is an American football coach and former player who currently serves at the linebackers coach at the University of Tennessee. He was the co-defensive coordinator and linebackers coach at the University of Washington from 2022–2023. Inge played football at the University of Iowa from 1993 to 1996, and has served in various assistant coach roles at the college and professional level for over twenty years.

== Early life and playing career ==
William Inge was born in Kirkwood, Missouri, to Beverly Ennis Inge and William Inge. He played football at Kirkwood High School and was a three-year starter at the University of Iowa under head coach Hayden Fry, playing defensive end there from 1993 to 1996. During his freshman year, his left kidney was surgically removed, and he played out his career with one kidney. Further adversity came during his senior year, when his father died suddenly of a heart attack at the age of 48. The Tennessee Oilers of the National Football League signed Inge as a free agent in 1997, but concerns about Inge's physical condition ended his career.

== Coaching career ==
Inge began his coaching career in 1998 as a graduate assistant and recruiting coordinator at Iowa. Inge continued in that role in 1999 when Hayden Fry retired and Kirk Ferentz succeeded Fry as head coach. In 2001, Northern Iowa head coach Mark Farley, then in his first year, hired Inge as his linebackers coach. Inge spent the next four years at Northern Iowa, becoming the defensive line coach in 2003 and the co-defensive coordinator and special teams coach in 2004. He left Northern Iowa in 2005 to coach the defensive line at the University of Colorado under head coach Gary Barnett; the 2005 team posted a 7–6 record and Barnett resigned at the end of the season.

New San Diego State University head coach Chuck Long hired Inge to be linebackers coach, a position Inge held from 2006 to 2007. Inge was one of several former Iowa Hawkeyes on the staff under Long, who had starred at quarterback and was a former defensive backs coach during Inge's last 2 seasons as a player. Inge left after the 2007 season to become linebackers coach at the University of Cincinnati under head coach Brian Kelly. Inge coached at Cincinnati for the 2008 and 2009 seasons, Kelly's final two at Cincinnati before taking the head coaching job at the University of Notre Dame.

Following the 2009 season, Inge followed offensive coordinator Jeff Quinn to the University at Buffalo as defensive coordinator and linebackers coach. He participated in the NFL's Bill Walsh Minority Coaching Fellowship in 2011 and coached linebackers with Dave Wannstedt. In 2012, Inge joined Wannstedt on the defensive staff of the NFL's Buffalo Bills as assistant defensive line coach. Inge held the job for a single season before departing to join Kevin Wilson's staff at the Indiana University as co-defensive coordinator and linebackers coach. Inge remained at Indiana for seven years, remaining on staff after Tom Allen replaced at the end of the 2016 season. Inge held various titles during his tenure there, including special teams coordinator/linebackers coach (2016), linebackers coach (2017), and special teams coordinator (2018–2019).

Indiana hired Fresno State's Kalen DeBoer to be offensive coordinator for the 2019 season. Following that season, DeBoer returned to Fresno State as its new head coach and took Inge with him as defensive coordinator. When DeBoer departed after the 2021 season to become head coach at the University of Washington, Inge again went with him as co-defensive coordinator (with Chuck Morrell) and safeties coach. Jedd Fisch succeeded DeBoer as head coach following the 2023 season, and Fisch hired Stephen Belichick as his defensive coordinator.
