= Yngve Johansson (footballer) =

Swedish footballer

Personal information
- Full name: Yngve Johansson
- Position: Forward

Senior career*
Years	Team	Apps	(Gls)
1950–1952	Malmö FF	25	(13)
- * Club domestic league appearances and goals

Yngve Johansson is a Swedish former footballer who played as a forward.
