= Pat Devlin (American football) =

American football player (born 1988)

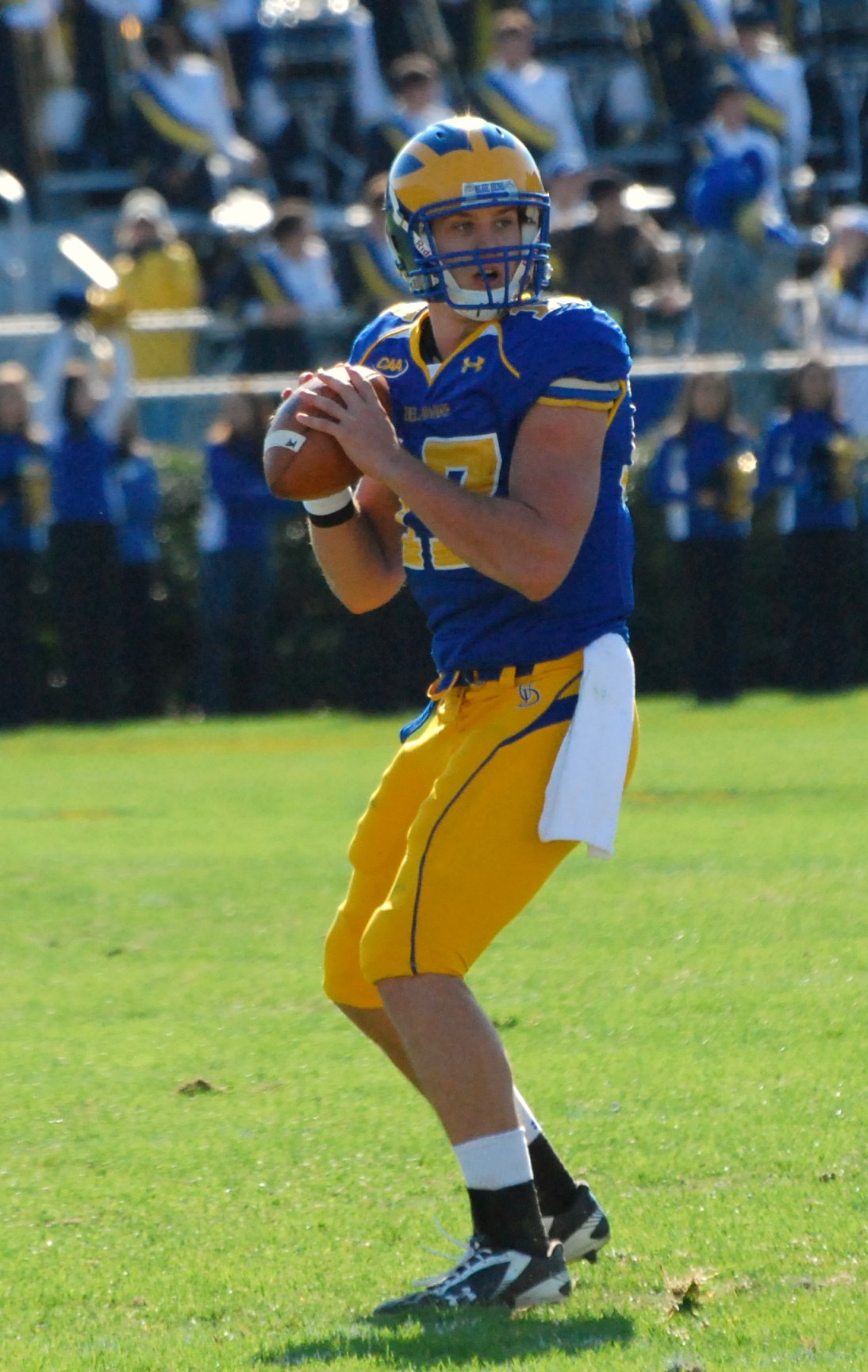
- Devlin with Delaware in 2009

No. 9, 7
- Position: Quarterback

Personal information
- Born: April 12, 1988 (age 38); Downingtown, Pennsylvania, U.S.
- Listed height: 6 ft 3 in (1.91 m)
- Listed weight: 220 lb (100 kg)

Career information
- High school: Downingtown East (Lionville, Pennsylvania)
- College: Penn State (2006–2008); Delaware (2009–2010)
- NFL draft: 2011: undrafted

Career history
- Miami Dolphins (2011–2013); Minnesota Vikings (2014–2015)*; Chicago Bears (2015)*; Cleveland Browns (2015)
- * Offseason or practice squad member only

Awards and highlights
- CAA Offensive Player of the Year (2010); ECAC All-East Offensive Player of the Year (2010)
- Stats at Pro Football Reference

Patrick Ryan Devlin (born April 12, 1988) is an American former professional football quarterback. Following a stint with Penn State, he played college football at Delaware, and was signed by the Miami Dolphins of the National Football League (NFL) as an undrafted free agent in 2011.

Devlin went on to join the Minnesota Vikings, where he was a member of the practice squad, and trained with the Chicago Bears and the Cleveland Browns in 2015, before signing with the Browns as a back-up later that year. In his five seasons in the NFL, he did not take a single snap.

== Early life ==
At Downingtown East High School, Devlin set the Pennsylvania high school career passing yards record with 8,162 career yards. He became a highly touted recruit, and although he verbally committed to the University of Miami, he eventually announced that he would be attending Pennsylvania State University to play for the Nittany Lions.

== College career ==
=== Penn State ===
==== 2007 ====
After redshirting the 2006 season, Devlin was listed as the third-string quarterback behind Anthony Morelli and Daryll Clark in 2007. Devlin saw action in games against Florida International, Wisconsin and Temple, but accumulated few statistics.

==== 2008 ====
In the weeks leading up to the start of the 2008 season, controversy swirled around the Nittany Lions' starting quarterback position. Daryll Clark, the more experienced and agile quarterback was being weighed against the younger, more prolific passing threat in Devlin. In the end, Penn State coach Joe Paterno chose to start Clark, while having him split as much time with Devlin as would be possible. Lopsided victories in the first four games of the 2008 season provided Devlin with much playing time. In games against Coastal Carolina, Oregon State, Syracuse and Temple, Devlin threw for 260 yards and was 18 of 35. When Clark was forced out in the fourth quarter of the Nittany Lions' crucial game against Ohio State due to a concussion, Devlin led the team on a go-ahead drive that was culminated by his own 1-yard touchdown run. He also had some playing time against Wisconsin, Michigan, Indiana and Michigan State. Devlin appeared in ten games for the Nittany Lions, passing for 459 yards, four touchdowns and no interceptions.

Devlin decided to transfer from Penn State prior to the 2009 Rose Bowl.

=== Delaware ===
==== 2009 ====
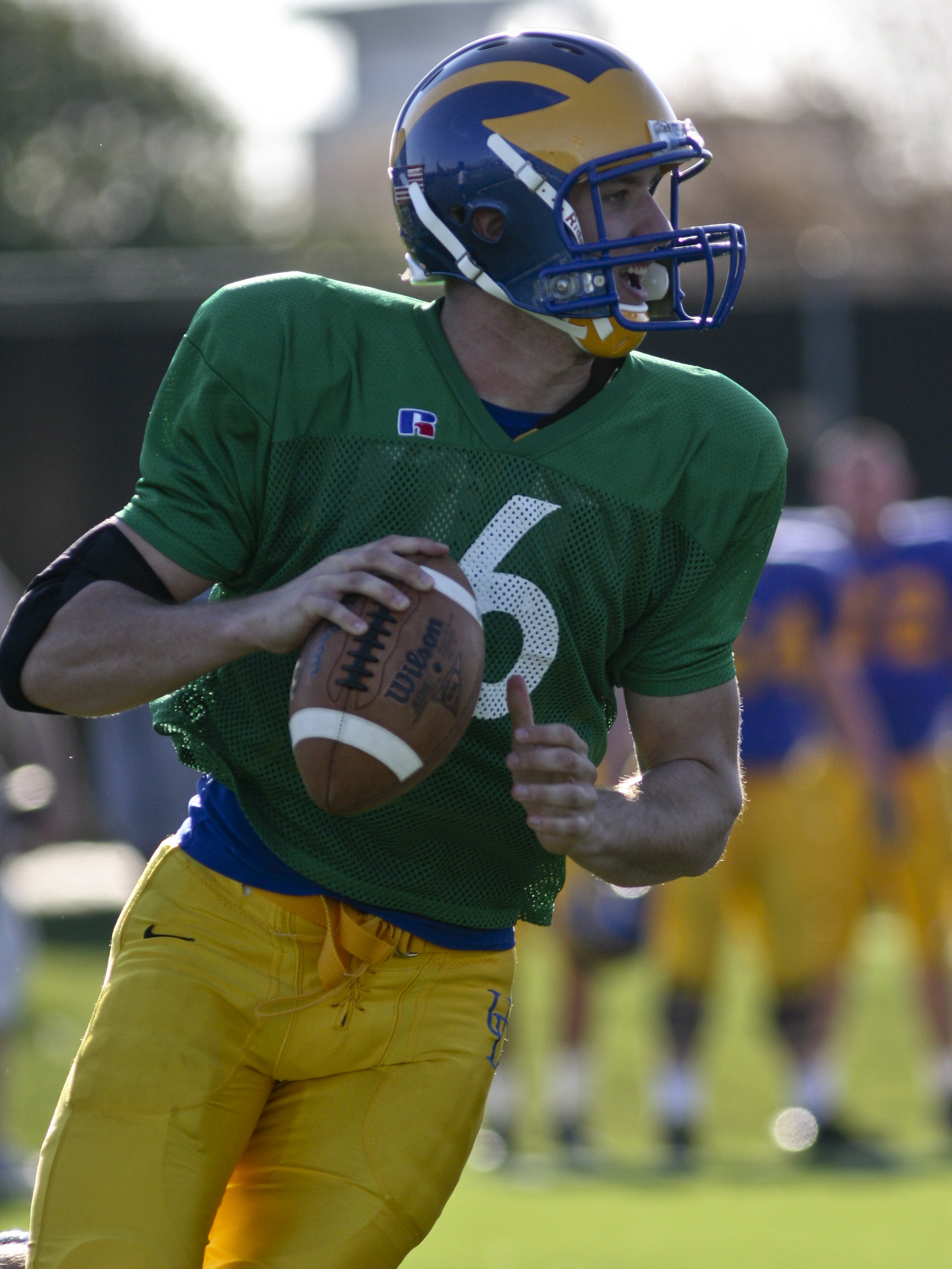
Devlin in practice with the Fightin' Blue Hens in 2009.

Devlin signed with the University of Delaware on February 4, 2009, to play for the Delaware Fightin' Blue Hens football team.

Devlin led the 2009 squad to a 6–5 record. Devlin started all eleven games for the Blue Hens, passing for 2,664 yards, sixteen touchdowns, and nine interceptions. In the final game of the season against Villanova, Devlin passed for Delaware school records in completions (42) and attempts (58) and threw for 407 yards. Devlin was named the Colonial Athletic Association Football Offensive Player of the Week twice during the season, and led the league in passing average per game (242.2 yards) and total offense per game (253.7 yards). He also was honored as the Eastern College Athletic Conference Division I – Championship Subdivision Offensive Player of the Week.

The Sports Network wrote that "Devlin has put some teeth back into the Blue Hen passing attack with his accurate throws and on-field leadership", and included him as a finalist in the voting for the 2009 Walter Payton Award, given to the most outstanding offensive player in the Division I Football Championship Subdivision (formerly Division I-AA). In November 2009, Devlin was honored as the local College Player of the Year by the Eagles Fly for Leukemia program, an organization supporting pediatric cancer and leukemia research in the Philadelphia metropolitan area.

==== 2010 ====
In June, Devlin was selected to the Consensus Draft Services Pre-Season NCAA Division I Football Championship Subdivision pre-season honorable mention All-American. The team is made up of players at the FCS level who the CDS staff predicts will be among the top players in the nation and have a chance to be selected in the National Football League Draft in April 2011. In July, Devlin was placed on the watchlists for the Walter Payton Award and the Johnny Unitas Golden Arm Award.

In the season's first game against West Chester, Devlin completed 14 of 23 passes for 163 yards with three touchdown passes to lead the team to a 31–0 shutout. Although Devlin fractured a bone in his non-throwing wrist in the first quarter of the game against South Dakota State, he played through the middle of the fourth quarter. Although cleared to play the following week against Duquesne, Devlin stood on the sidelines. Devlin came back the following week with a big second-half win against Richmond, but was knocked out of the following week's game against James Madison with a concussion. Back at home against Maine, Devlin completed 20 of 36 passes for 286 yards, leading the Blue Hens to their sixth win of the season. After a close win against Rhode Island and a one-point loss against William & Mary, he dominated against Towson, completing 29 of 38 passes for 318 yards and one touchdown while running for another score. Devlin became the ninth Delaware player to pass for over 4,000 yards in a career. Against UMass, Devlin completed 16 of 22 passes for 240 yards, four touchdowns and an interception in a 45–27 win. Delaware were briefly ranked No. 1, before losing to rivals Villanova 28–21 in overtime, with Devlin completing 30 of 45 passes for 305 yards and three touchdowns.

In the post-season, Delaware had a first round bye, and in the second round, they defeated Lehigh 42–20, with Devlin completing 19 of 26 passes for 256 yards and four touchdowns. In the quarter-finals, they defeated New Hampshire 16–3, and Devlin completed 27 of 38 passes for 261 yards and two touchdowns. In the semi-final, they defeated Georgia Southern 27–10, and Devlin completed 14 of 20 passes for 137 yards and two touchdowns. In the NCAA Division I Football Championship Game, Devlin completed 22 of 34 passes for 220 yards, but threw an interception as Delaware lost the game 20–19 to Eastern Washington. His performances during the season saw him being named the Colonial Athletic Association Player of the Year.

=== College statistics ===
Season	Team	Comp	Att	Pct	Yds	TD	Int
2006	Penn State	Redshirt					
2007	Penn State	0	1	0.0	0	0	0
2008	Penn State	25	47	53.2	459	4	0
2009	Delaware	220	344	64.0	2,664	16	9
2010	Delaware	261	384	68.0	3,032	22	3
Totals		506	776	65.2	6,155	42	12

== Professional career ==
=== Pre-draft ===
Pre-draft measurables
Height	Weight	Arm length	Hand span	40-yard dash	10-yard split	20-yard split	20-yard shuttle	Three-cone drill	Vertical jump	Wonderlic
6 ft 3 in (1.91 m)	225 lb (102 kg)	32 in (0.81 m)	9 7/8 in (0.25 m)	4.81 s	1.67 s	2.78 s	4.32 s	7.08 s	33 in (0.84 m)	27
All values from NFL Combine/Delaware Pro Day

Devlin entered the 2011 NFL draft and was regarded as one of the top ten quarterbacks entering the draft by NFL Network analyst Mike Mayock, but was not drafted. He was targeted as the first overall pick in the 2011 UFL draft, but declined to sign a mandatory contract.

=== Miami Dolphins ===
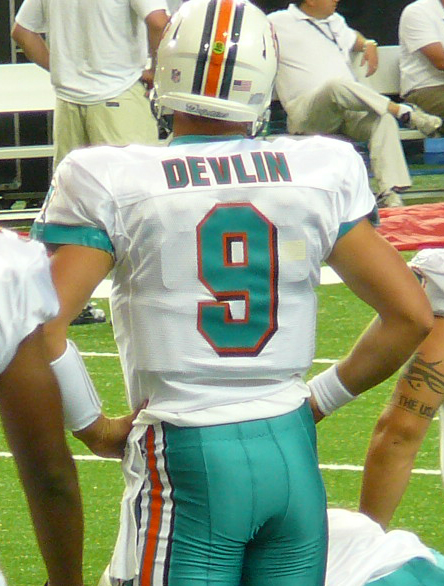
Devlin with the Dolphins in 2011.

Devlin was signed by the Miami Dolphins as an undrafted free agent on July 26, 2011. He was waived after the preseason, but signed with the team's practice squad. He was promoted to the team's active roster on December 20. In the 2012 season, he remained the Dolphins' third-string quarterback by beating out David Garrard, and in the 2013 season, he made the 53-man team, after wide receiver Marvin McNutt was released. During the Dolphins' 2014 preseason, Devlin injured his hamstring, and on August 11, 2014, he was waived in favor of signing Brady Quinn.

=== Minnesota Vikings ===
Devlin was signed to the Minnesota Vikings practice squad on November 3, 2014. On April 2, 2015, Devlin was waived by the Vikings.

=== Chicago Bears ===
Devlin was signed to the Chicago Bears on May 11, 2015. On June 18, 2015, he was waived by the Bears.

=== Cleveland Browns ===
Devlin was signed to the Cleveland Browns on August 27, 2015. He was released by the Browns on September 5, 2015. On December 31, 2015, Devlin was re-signed by the Browns to be back-up to Austin Davis, after it was determined Johnny Manziel would not play due to his status in the NFL concussion protocol. He was not re-signed by the Browns going into the 2016 season, as the franchise moved on from Manziel and brought in Robert Griffin III as their preferred starting quarterback.

== Personal life ==
Devlin is married to Tristin Jones, with whom he has three children. He is a nephew of former Buffalo Bills offensive tackle Joe Devlin.
