= 2010 Rhode Island Rams football team =

American college football season

2010 Rhode Island Rams football
- Conference: Colonial Athletic Association
- Record: 5–6 (4–4 CAA)
- Head coach: Joe Trainer (2nd season)
- Offensive coordinator: Chris Pincince (3rd season)
- Defensive coordinator: Rob Neviaser (2nd season)
- Home stadium: Meade Stadium

2010 Colonial Athletic Association football standings
	Conf.			Overall
Team	W		L	W		L
No. 2 Delaware +^	6	–	2	12	–	3
No. 10 William & Mary +^	6	–	2	8	–	4
No. 3 Villanova ^	5	–	3	9	–	5
No. 7 New Hampshire ^	5	–	3	8	–	5
UMass	4	–	4	6	–	5
Richmond	4	–	4	6	–	5
Rhode Island	4	–	4	5	–	6
James Madison	3	–	5	6	–	5
Maine	3	–	5	4	–	7
Towson	0	–	8	1	–	10
+ – Conference co-champions; ^ – FCS playoff participant; Rankings from The Sports Network poll

The 2010 Rhode Island Rams football team represented the University of Rhode Island in the 2010 NCAA Division I FCS football season as a member of the Colonial Athletic Association (CAA). The Rams were led by second year head coach Joe Trainer and played their home games at Meade Stadium. They finished the season with five wins and six losses (5–6, 4–4 in CAA play) and finished tied for in fifth place in conference.

== Schedule ==
Date	Time	Opponent	Site	TV	Result	Attendance
September 2	7:00 pm	at Buffalo*	UB Stadium; Amherst, NY		L 0–31	16,273
September 11	6:00 pm	at Fordham*	Coffey Field; Bronx, NY		L 25–27	2,952
September 18	12:00 pm	No. 8 New Hampshire	Meade Stadium; Kingston, RI	CSN	W 28–25	4,521
October 2	1:00 pm	Brown*	Meade Stadium; Kingston, RI (rivalry)		W 27–24 ^{OT}	7,622
October 9	7:00 pm	at No. 4 William & Mary	Zable Stadium; Williamsburg, VA		L 7–26	8,196
October 16	3:30 pm	at No. 2 Delaware	Delaware Stadium; Newark, DE		L 17–24	22,576
October 23	12:30 pm	Maine	Meade Stadium; Kingston, RI		L 23–28	4,625
October 30	3:30 pm	at Towson*	Johnny Unitas Stadium; Towson, MD		W 30–20	6,589
November 6	1:00 pm	No. 3 Villanova	Meade Stadium; Kingston, RI		W 17–14	3,144
November 13	2:00 pm	at No. 21 Richmond	E. Claiborne Robins Stadium; Richmond, VA		L 6–15	8,136
November 20	12:30 pm	No. 19 UMass	Meade Stadium; Kingston RI		W 37–34	3,156
*Non-conference game; Rankings from The Sports Network Poll released prior to the game; All times are in Eastern time
