= 2011 NCAA Division I Football Championship Game =

Postseason college football game

2011 NCAA Division I Football Championship
- FCS National Championship Game
Delaware Fightin' Blue Hens	Eastern Washington Eagles
(12–2)	(12–2)
CAA	Big Sky
19	20
Head coach: K. C. Keeler	Head coach: Beau Baldwin
TSN / Seed; 5 / 3	TSN / Seed; 1 / 5
	1	2	3	4	Total
Delaware	6	6	7	0	19
Eastern Washington	0	0	6	14	20
- Date: January 7, 2011
- Season: 2010
- Stadium: Pizza Hut Park
- Location: Frisco, Texas
- MVP: Bo Levi Mitchell (QB, Eastern Washington)
- Favorite: Delaware by 8.5
- Referee: Rodney Burnette (SoCon)
- Attendance: 13,027

United States TV coverage
- Network: ESPN2

The 2011 NCAA Division I Football Championship Game was a postseason college football game between the Delaware Fightin' Blue Hens and the Eastern Washington Eagles. It was played on January 7, 2011, at Pizza Hut Park in Frisco, Texas. The culminating game of the 2010 NCAA Division I FCS football season, it was won by Eastern Washington, 20–19.

This was the first FCS (formerly Division I-AA) title game played in Frisco, after the prior 13 editions had been contested at Finley Stadium in Chattanooga, Tennessee. With the tournament field expanded from 16 to 20 teams, this was also the first time for the title game to be contested in January, several weeks after the semifinals. Played on a Friday night with a kickoff shortly after 6:00 p.m. CST, it was broadcast on ESPN2.

== Teams ==
The participants of the Championship Game were the finalists of the 2010 FCS Playoffs, which began with a 20-team bracket. This was the first season of 20 teams in the tournament field; it had been 16 teams since 1986.

=== Delaware Fightin' Blue Hens ===
Delaware finished their regular season with a 9–2 record (6–2 in conference). As the third-seed in the tournament, the Fightin' Blue Hens defeated Lehigh, New Hampshire, and Georgia Southern to reach the final. This was Delaware's fourth appearance in an FCS/Division I-AA title game, having previously won in 2003, and having lost in 1982 and 2007.

=== Eastern Washington Eagles ===
Eastern Washington finished their regular season with a 9–2 record (7–1 in conference), with one of their losses coming to Nevada of the FBS. As the fifth-seed in the tournament, the Eagles defeated Southeast Missouri State, North Dakota State, and Villanova to reach the final. This was Eastern Washington's first appearance in an FCS/Division I-AA championship game.

== Game summary ==
Delaware held a 12–0 lead at halftime and had extended their lead to 19–0 with under five minutes remaining in the third quarter, only to see Eastern Washington score three touchdowns in the remainder of the game to win the title, 20–19.

=== Scoring summary ===
Scoring summary

Quarter	Time	Drive			Team	Scoring information	Score	
Quarter	Time	Plays	Yards	TOP	Team	Scoring information	DEL	EWU
1	5:14	14	80	6:09	DEL	Andrew Pierce 3-yard touchdown run, Mike Perry kick blocked	6	0
2	12:29	13	76	5:16	DEL	21-yard field goal by Perry	9	0
2	6:46	10	49	3:27	DEL	33-yard field goal by Perry	12	0
3	7:12	10	60	4:43	DEL	David Hayes 1-yard touchdown run, Perry kick good	19	0
3	3:15	5	80	1:30	EWU	Brandon Kaufman 22-yard touchdown reception from Bo Levi Mitchell, 2-point pass incomplete	19	6
4	3:15	14	89	4:47	EWU	Nicholas Edwards 9-yard touchdown reception from Mitchell, Jarrett kick good	19	13
4	2:47	8	63	3:25	EWU	Kaufman 11-yard touchdown reception from Mitchell, Jarrett kick good	19	20
"TOP" = time of possession. For other American football terms, see Glossary of American football.							19	20

=== Game statistics ===
	1	2	3	4	Total
No. 3 Fightin' Blue Hens	6	6	7	0	19
No. 5 Eagles	0	0	6	14	20

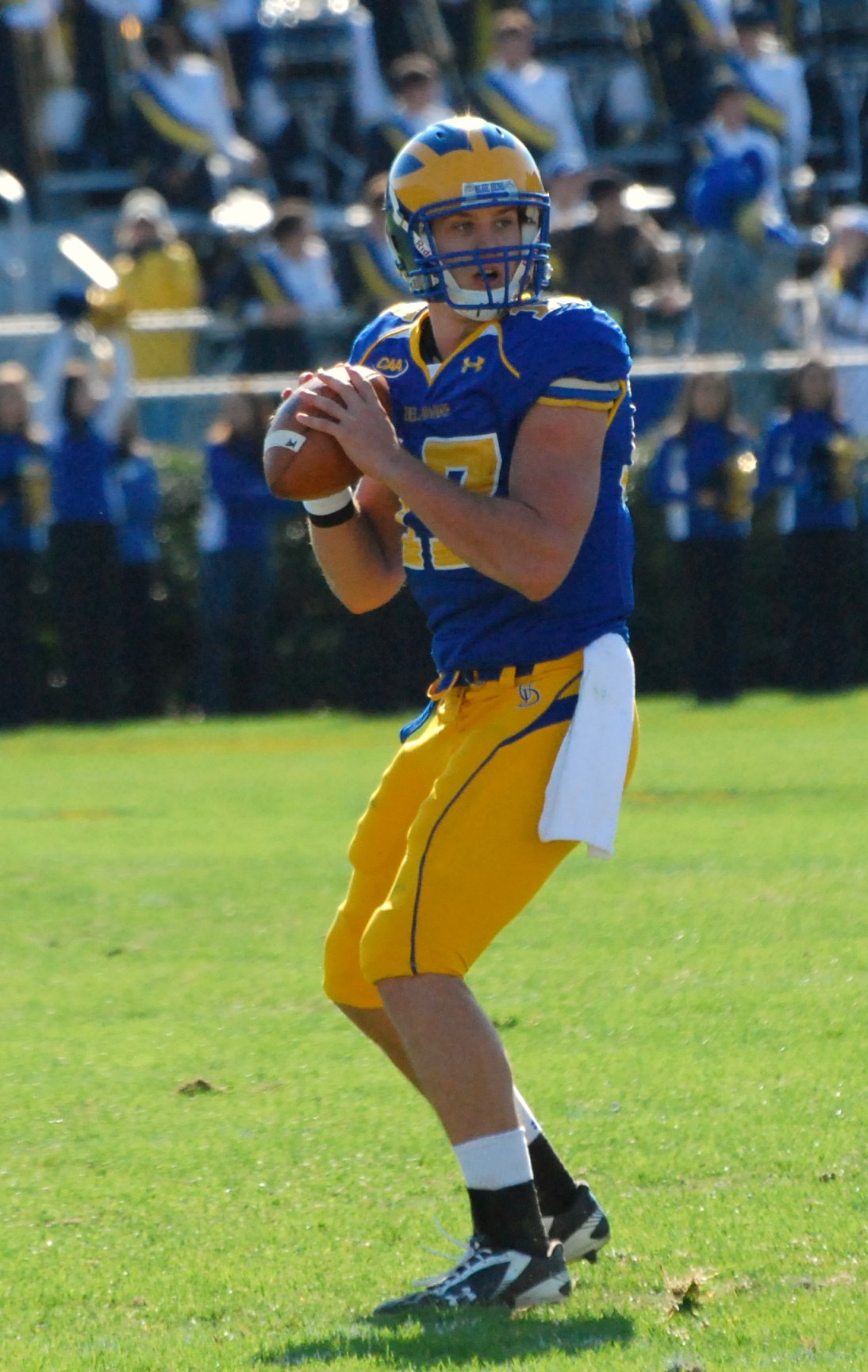
Delaware quarterback Pat Devlin

Statistics	DEL	EWU
First downs	26	20
Plays–yards	80–417	64–327
Rushes–yards	46–197	21–25
Passing yards	220	302
Passing: comp–att–int	22–34–1	29–43–1
Time of possession	33:41	26:19

Team	Category	Player	Statistics
Delaware	Passing	Pat Devlin	22–34, 220 yds, 1 INT
Delaware	Rushing	Andrew Pierce	28 car, 142 yds, 1 TD
Delaware	Receiving	Nihja White	5 rec, 73 yds
Eastern Washington	Passing	Bo Levi Mitchell	29–43, 302 yds, 3 TD, 1 INT
Eastern Washington	Rushing	Mario Brown	13 car, 23 yds
Eastern Washington	Receiving	Nicholas Edwards	6 rec, 74 yds, 1 TD
