= 2010 Towson Tigers football team =

American college football season

2010 Towson Tigers football
- Conference: Colonial Athletic Association
- Record: 1–10 (0–8 CAA)
- Head coach: Rob Ambrose (2nd season)
- Home stadium: Johnny Unitas Stadium

2010 Colonial Athletic Association football standings
	Conf.			Overall
Team	W		L	W		L
No. 2 Delaware +^	6	–	2	12	–	3
No. 10 William & Mary +^	6	–	2	8	–	4
No. 3 Villanova ^	5	–	3	9	–	5
No. 7 New Hampshire ^	5	–	3	8	–	5
UMass	4	–	4	6	–	5
Richmond	4	–	4	6	–	5
Rhode Island	4	–	4	5	–	6
James Madison	3	–	5	6	–	5
Maine	3	–	5	4	–	7
Towson	0	–	8	1	–	10
+ – Conference co-champions; ^ – FCS playoff participant; Rankings from The Sports Network poll

The 2010 Towson Tigers football team represented Towson University in the 2010 NCAA Division I FCS football season. They were led by second-year head coach Rob Ambrose and played their home games at Johnny Unitas Stadium. They are a member of the Colonial Athletic Association. They finished the season 1–10, 0–8 in CAA play.

== Schedule ==
Date	Time	Opponent	Site	TV	Result	Attendance
September 2	7:30 pm	at Indiana*	Memorial Stadium; Bloomington, IN	Big Ten Network	L 17–51	35,242
September 11	7:00 pm	Coastal Carolina*	Johnny Unitas Stadium; Towson, MD		W 47–45 ^{5OT}	8,990
September 18	3:30 pm	at No. 1 Villanova	Villanova Stadium; Villanova, PA	TCN	L 7–43	12,111
September 25	12:30 pm	at Columbia*	Robert K. Kraft Field at Lawrence A. Wien Stadium; New York, NY		L 10–24	2,643
October 2	7:00 pm	No. 8 UMass	Johnny Unitas Stadium; Towson, MD		L 14–27	5,560
October 9	7:00 pm	No. 7 James Madison	Johnny Unitas Stadium; Towson, MD		L 13–17	9,049
October 23	3:30 pm	at No. 16 Richmond	E. Claiborne Robins Stadium; Richmiond, VA		L 6–28	8,700
October 30	3:30 pm	Rhode Island^{†}	Johnny Unitas Stadium; Towson, MD		L 20–30	6,589
November 6	3:30 pm	at No. 5 Delaware	Delaware Stadium; Newark, DE		L 0–48	21,603
November 13	2:00 pm	Maine	Johnny Unitas Stadium; Towson, MD		L 18–28	
November 20	12:00 pm	at No. 14 New Hampshire	Cowell Stadium; Durham, NH	UNHTV	L 19–38	5,003
*Non-conference game; ^{†}Homecoming; Rankings from The Sports Network Poll released prior to the game; All times are in Eastern time
