= 2010 Marist Red Foxes football team =

American college football season

2010 Marist Red Foxes football
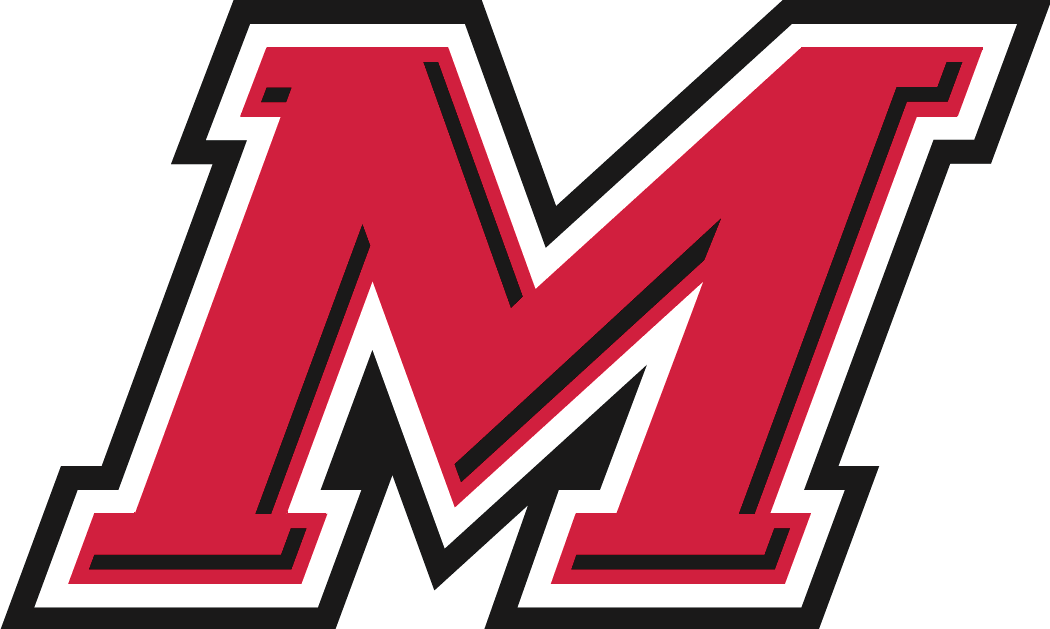
- Conference: Pioneer Football League
- Record: 3–8 (2–6 PFL)
- Head coach: Jim Parady (19th season)
- Defensive coordinator: Scott Rumsey (11th season)
- Home stadium: Tenney Stadium at Leonidoff Field

2010 Pioneer Football League standings
	Conf.			Overall
Team	W		L	W		L
No. 22 Jacksonville +	8	–	0	10	–	1
No. 25 Dayton +	8	–	0	10	–	1
Drake	6	–	2	7	–	4
San Diego	5	–	3	5	–	6
Morehead State	4	–	4	5	–	6
Davidson	3	–	5	3	–	8
Butler	2	–	6	4	–	7
Marist	2	–	6	3	–	8
Campbell	2	–	6	3	–	8
Valparaiso	0	–	8	0	–	11
+ – Conference co-champions; Rankings from The Sports Network poll

The 2010 Marist Red Foxes football team represented Marist College as a member of the Pioneer Football League (PFL) during the 2010 NCAA Division I FCS football season. Led by 19th-year head coach Jim Parady, the Red Foxes compiled an overall record of 3–8 with a mark of 2–6 in conference play, placing in three-way tie for seventh in the PFL. Marist played home games at Tenney Stadium at Leonidoff Field in Poughkeepsie, New York.

== Schedule ==
Date	Time	Opponent	Site	Result	Attendance
September 3	7:00 p.m.	Sacred Heart*	Tenney Stadium at Leonidoff Field; Poughkeepsie, NY	L 25–28	2,867
September 11	6:00 p.m.	Bucknell*	Tenney Stadium at Leonidoff Field; Poughkeepsie, NY	W 14–3	2,546
September 25	12:00 p.m.	Morehead State	Tenney Stadium at Leonidoff Field; Poughkeepsie, NY	L 39–45	1,907
October 2	2:00 p.m.	Drake	Drake Stadium; Des Moines, IA	L 0–42	3,421
October 9	2:00 p.m.	Valparaiso	Brown Field; Valparaiso, IN	W 51–7	1,107
October 16	12:00 p.m.	San Diego	Tenney Stadium at Leonidoff Field; Poughkeepsie, NY	L 10–14	2,154
October 23	12:00 p.m.	at Jacksonville	D. B. Milne Field; Jacksonville, FL	L 14–56	4,223
October 30	1:00 p.m.	at Campbell	Barker–Lane Stadium; Buies Creek, NC	W 42–14	3,325
November 6	12:00 p.m.	Davidson	Tenney Stadium at Leonidoff Field; Poughkeepsie, NY	L 21–28	1,772
November 13	12:00 p.m.	No. 24 Dayton	Tenney Stadium at Leonidoff Field; Poughkeepsie, NY	L 34–41 ^{2OT}	1,942
November 20	1:00 p.m.	at Georgetown*	Multi-Sport Field; Washington, DC	L 7–14	2,013
*Non-conference game; Rankings from The Sports Network Poll released prior to the game; All times are in Eastern time
