= 2010 James Madison Dukes football team =

American college football season

2010 James Madison Dukes football
- Conference: Colonial Athletic Association
- South Division
- Record: 6–5 (3–5 CAA)
- Head coach: Mickey Matthews (12th season)
- Offensive coordinator: Jeff Durden (7th season)
- Defensive coordinator: Kyle Gillenwater (2nd season)
- Home stadium: Bridgeforth Stadium

2010 Colonial Athletic Association football standings
	Conf.			Overall
Team	W		L	W		L
No. 2 Delaware +^	6	–	2	12	–	3
No. 10 William & Mary +^	6	–	2	8	–	4
No. 3 Villanova ^	5	–	3	9	–	5
No. 7 New Hampshire ^	5	–	3	8	–	5
UMass	4	–	4	6	–	5
Richmond	4	–	4	6	–	5
Rhode Island	4	–	4	5	–	6
James Madison	3	–	5	6	–	5
Maine	3	–	5	4	–	7
Towson	0	–	8	1	–	10
+ – Conference co-champions; ^ – FCS playoff participant; Rankings from The Sports Network poll

The 2010 James Madison Dukes football team represented James Madison University in the 2010 NCAA Division I FCS football season. The Dukes were led by 12th year head coach Mickey Matthews in what proved to be a roller-coaster season. The Dukes made college football history when they knocked off in-state power #13 Virginia Tech, on the road, in front of over 66,000 fans. James Madison became the second FCS team to beat a nationally ranked FBS opponent since Appalachian State defeated #5 ranked Michigan in 2007. Not long after the victory of Virginia Tech the injuries began to mount up and paired with a difficult in-conference schedule. JMU finished the season 6–5 with nine of the eleven games decided by 7 points or less.

== Schedule ==
Date	Time	Opponent	Rank	Site	TV	Result	Attendance
September 4	6:00 pm	Morehead State*	No. 15	Bridgeforth Stadium; Harrisonburg, VA		W 48–7	16,612
September 11	1:30 pm	at No. 13 (FBS) Virginia Tech*	No. 12	Lane Stadium; Blacksburg, VA	ESPN3	W 21–16	66,233
September 25	6:00 pm	No. 21 Liberty*	No. 3	Bridgeforth Stadium; Harrisonburg, VA		W 10–3	16,385
October 2	12:00 pm	No. 5 Delaware	No. 3	Bridgeforth Stadium; Harrisonburg, VA (rivalry)	CSN	L 10–13	16,205
October 9	7:00 pm	at Towson	No. 7	Johnny Unitas Stadium; Towson, MD		W 17–13	9,049
October 16	3:30 pm	No. 15 New Hampshire	No. 6	Bridgeforth Stadium; Harrisonburg, VA	CSN	L 14–28	16,985
October 23	3:30 pm	at No. 6 Villanova	No. 11	Villanova Stadium; Villanova, PA		L 7–14	9,217
October 30	3:30 pm	No. 18 UMass	No. 15	Bridgeforth Stadium; Harrisonburg, VA	CSN	L 14–21	16,664
November 6	3:30 pm	at No. 20 Richmond	No. 22	E. Claiborne Robins Stadium; Richmond, VA (rivalry)	CSN	L 10–13 ^{OT}	8,700
November 13	1:30 pm	No. 1 William & Mary		Bridgeforth Stadium; Harrisonburg, VA (rivalry)		W 30–24	16,733
November 20	12:00 pm	at Maine		Alfond Stadium; Orono, ME		W 14–10	3,880
*Non-conference game; Rankings from The Sports Network Poll released prior to the game; All times are in Eastern time
