= 2010 Campbell Fighting Camels football team =

American college football season

2010 Campbell Fighting Camels football
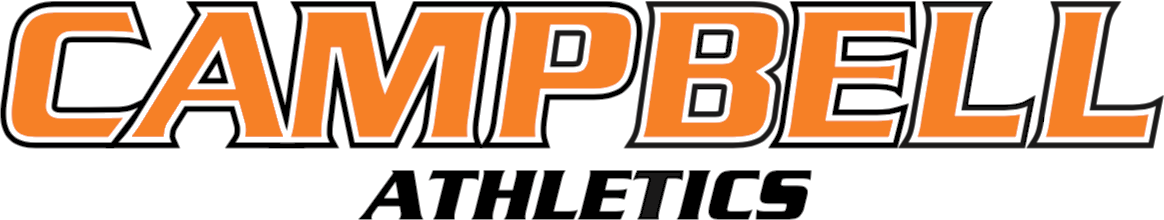
- Conference: Pioneer Football League
- Record: 3–8 (2–6 PFL)
- Head coach: Dale Steele (3rd season)
- Offensive coordinator: Oscar Olejniczak (3rd season)
- Defensive coordinator: Art Link (3rd season)
- Home stadium: Barker–Lane Stadium

2010 Pioneer Football League standings
	Conf.			Overall
Team	W		L	W		L
No. 22 Jacksonville +	8	–	0	10	–	1
No. 25 Dayton +	8	–	0	10	–	1
Drake	6	–	2	7	–	4
San Diego	5	–	3	5	–	6
Morehead State	4	–	4	5	–	6
Davidson	3	–	5	3	–	8
Butler	2	–	6	4	–	7
Marist	2	–	6	3	–	8
Campbell	2	–	6	3	–	8
Valparaiso	0	–	8	0	–	11
+ – Conference co-champions; Rankings from The Sports Network poll

The 2010 Campbell Fighting Camels football team represented Campbell University in the 2010 NCAA Division I FCS football season as a member of the Pioneer Football League (PFL). The Fighting Camels were led by third-year head coach Dale Steele and played their home games at Barker–Lane Stadium. Campbell finished the season 3–8 overall and 2–6 in PFL play to place seventh.

== Schedule ==
Date	Time	Opponent	Site	Result	Attendance
September 4	6:00 p.m.	at Virginia–Wise*	Carl Smith Stadium; Wise, VA	W 20–16	2,300
September 11	1:00 p.m.	Old Dominion*	Barker–Lane Stadium; Buies Creek, NC	L 13–44	5,462
September 18	1:00 p.m.	Davidson	Barker–Lane Stadium; Buies Creek, NC	L 27–28	3,741
September 25	1:00 p.m.	Georgia State*	Barker–Lane Stadium; Buies Creek, NC	L 21–24	3,021
October 2	12:00 p.m.	at Butler	Butler Bowl; Indianapolis, IN	W 27–10	1,674
October 16	1:00 p.m.	Drake	Barker–Lane Stadium; Buies Creek, NC	L 12–14	2,474
October 23	1:00 p.m.	at Dayton	Welcome Stadium; Dayton, OH	L 23–41	2,180
October 30	1:00 p.m.	Marist^{†}	Barker–Lane Stadium; Buies Creek, NC	L 14–42	3,325
November 6	1:00 p.m.	Valparaiso	Barker–Lane Stadium; Buies Creek, NC	W 56–14	1,656
November 13	12:00 p.m.	at No. 22 Jacksonville	D. B. Milne Field; Jacksonville, FL	L 24–31	5,160
November 20	1:00 p.m.	at Morehead State	Jayne Stadium; Morehead, KY	L 24–30 ^{OT}	2,127
*Non-conference game; ^{†}Homecoming; Rankings from The Sports Network Poll released prior to the game; All times are in Eastern time
