= 2010 Drake Bulldogs football team =

American college football season

2010 Drake Bulldogs football

Kilimanjaro Bowl champion

Kilimanjaro Bowl, W 17–7 vs. CONADEIP
- Conference: Pioneer Football League
- Record: 7–4 (6–2 PFL)
- Head coach: Chris Creighton (3rd season)
- Offensive scheme: Multiple
- Defensive coordinator: Tom Allen (1st season)
- Base defense: 4–2–5
- Home stadium: Drake Stadium

2010 Pioneer Football League standings
	Conf.			Overall
Team	W		L	W		L
No. 22 Jacksonville +	8	–	0	10	–	1
No. 25 Dayton +	8	–	0	10	–	1
Drake	6	–	2	7	–	4
San Diego	5	–	3	5	–	6
Morehead State	4	–	4	5	–	6
Davidson	3	–	5	3	–	8
Butler	2	–	6	4	–	7
Marist	2	–	6	3	–	8
Campbell	2	–	6	3	–	8
Valparaiso	0	–	8	0	–	11
+ – Conference co-champions; Rankings from The Sports Network poll

The 2010 Drake Bulldogs football team represented Drake University as a member of the Pioneer Football League (PFL) during the 2010 NCAA Division I FCS football season. Led by third-year head coach Chris Creighton, the Bulldogs compiled an overall record of 7–4 with a mark of 6–2 in conference play, placing third in the PFL. The team played its home games at Drake Stadium in Des Moines, Iowa.

In May 2011, Drake played in the 2011 Kilimanjaro Bowl, the first college football game held on the continent of Africa. The Bulldogs played against an All-Star team of Mexican players from the CONADEIP league, marking the first NCAA Division I bowl game played against a Mexican team since the 1945 Sun Bowl. The idea for the game was conceived by Drake head coach Chris Creighton.

== Schedule ==
Date	Time	Opponent	Site	Result	Attendance	Source
September 4	6:00 p.m.	No. 19 Lehigh*	Drake Stadium; Des Moines, IA	L 14–28	3,628	
September 11	7:00 p.m.	at Missouri S&T*	Allgood–Bailey Stadium; Rolla, MO	W 28–14	3,200	
September 18	2:00 p.m.	at No. 6 Montana State*	Bobcat Stadium; Bozeman, MT	L 21–48	13,777	
September 25	1:00 p.m.	at Valparaiso	Brown Field; Valparaiso, IN	W 21–19	3,116	
October 2	1:00 p.m.	Marist^{†}	Drake Stadium; Des Moines, IA	W 42–0	3,421	
October 9	11:00 a.m.	at No. 18 Jacksonville	D. B. Milne Field; Jacksonville, FL	L 34–39	2,843	
October 16	12:00 p.m.	at Campbell	Barker–Lane Stadium; Buies Creek, NC	W 14–12	2,474	
October 23	1:00 p.m.	Davidson	Drake Stadium; Des Moines, IA	W 42–10	2,186	
October 30	1:00 p.m.	San Diego	Drake Stadium; Des Moines, IA	W 38–17	1,997	
November 6	12:00 p.m.	at Dayton	Welcome Stadium; Dayton, OH (rivalry)	L 25–31	1,723	
November 13	1:00 p.m.	Butler	Drake Stadium; Des Moines, IA	W 10–7	1,598	
May 21, 2011	2:30 p.m.	vs. CONADEIP*	Sheikh Amri Abeid Memorial Stadium; Arusha, Tanzania (Kilimanjaro Bowl)	W 17–7	11,781	
*Non-conference game; ^{†}Homecoming; Rankings from The Sports Network Poll released prior to the game; All times are in Central time

== Game summaries ==
=== Vs. CONADEIP (Kilimanjaro Bowl) ===
2011 Kilimanjaro Bowl
CONADEIP All-Stars vs. Drake Bulldogs – Game summary

Quarter	1	2	3	4	Total
All-Stars	0	0	0	7	7
Bulldogs	3	0	0	14	17

at Sheikh Amri Abeid Memorial Stadium, Arusha, Tanzania

- Date: May 21, 2011
- Game time: 2:30 p.m. CDT
- Game attendance: 11,781
- Referee: Bill LeMonnier
- TV: ITV
- Recap

Game information
First quarter
- DRKE – Billy Janssen 27-yard field goal. Bulldogs 3–0.

Second quarter

- No scoring plays

Third quarter

- No scoring plays

Fourth quarter

- CON – José Reyes 5-yard run (Erick Gómez Vargas kick). All-Stars 7–3.
- DRKE – Joey Orlando 11-yard pass from Nick Ens (Billy Janssen kick). Bulldogs 10–7.
- DRKE – Patrick Cashmore 2-yard run (Billy Janssen kick). Bulldogs 17–7.
