= 2010 Davidson Wildcats football team =

American college football season

2010 Davidson Wildcats football
- Conference: Pioneer Football League
- Record: 3–8 (3–5 PFL)
- Head coach: Tripp Merritt (6th season)
- Home stadium: Richardson Stadium

2010 Pioneer Football League standings
	Conf.			Overall
Team	W		L	W		L
No. 22 Jacksonville +	8	–	0	10	–	1
No. 25 Dayton +	8	–	0	10	–	1
Drake	6	–	2	7	–	4
San Diego	5	–	3	5	–	6
Morehead State	4	–	4	5	–	6
Davidson	3	–	5	3	–	8
Butler	2	–	6	4	–	7
Marist	2	–	6	3	–	8
Campbell	2	–	6	3	–	8
Valparaiso	0	–	8	0	–	11
+ – Conference co-champions; Rankings from The Sports Network poll

The 2010 Davidson Wildcats football team represented Davidson College as a member of the Pioneer Football League (PFL) during the 2010 NCAA Division I FCS football season. The Wildcats were led by sixth-year head coach Tripp Merritt and played their home games at Richardson Stadium. They compiled an overall record of 3–8 with a mark of 3–5 in conference play, placing sixth in the PFL.

== Schedule ==
Date	Time	Opponent	Site	Result	Attendance	Source
September 4	6:00 p.m.	Georgetown*	Richardson Stadium; Davidson, NC	L 10–20	4,733	
September 11	7:00 p.m.	at Lenoir–Rhyne*	Moretz Stadium; Hickory, NC	L 13–41	7,081	
September 18	1:00 p.m.	at Campbell	Barker–Lane Stadium; Buies Creek, NC	W 28–27	3,741	
September 25	1:00 p.m.	Jacksonville	Richardson Stadium; Davidson, NC	L 15–42	2,362	
October 9	12:00 p.m.	Butler	Richardson Stadium; Davidson, NC	L 8–24	2,272	
October 16	1:00 p.m.	at Morehead State	Jayne Stadium; Morehead, KY	W 17–10	3,456	
October 23	2:00 p.m.	at Drake	Drake Stadium; Des Moines, IA	L 10–42	2,186	
October 30	1:00 p.m.	Dayton	Richardson Stadium; Davidson, NC	L 13–37	4,263	
November 6	12:00 p.m.	at Marist	Tenney Stadium at Leonidoff Field; Poughkeepsie, NY	W 28–21	1,772	
November 13	1:00 p.m.	San Diego	Richardson Stadium; Davidson, NC	L 16–49	4,411	
November 20	1:00 p.m.	at Presbyterian*	Bailey Memorial Stadium; Clinton, SC	L 6–42	3,593	
*Non-conference game; All times are in Eastern time
