= 2010 Butler Bulldogs football team =

American college football season

2010 Butler Bulldogs football
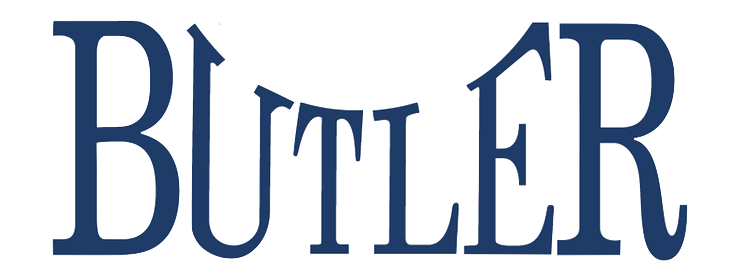
- Conference: Pioneer Football League
- Record: 4–7 (2–6 PFL)
- Head coach: Jeff Voris (5th season)
- Co-defensive coordinators: Joe Cheshire (1st season); Tim Cooper (1st season)
- Home stadium: Butler Bowl

2010 Pioneer Football League standings
	Conf.			Overall
Team	W		L	W		L
No. 22 Jacksonville +	8	–	0	10	–	1
No. 25 Dayton +	8	–	0	10	–	1
Drake	6	–	2	7	–	4
San Diego	5	–	3	5	–	6
Morehead State	4	–	4	5	–	6
Davidson	3	–	5	3	–	8
Butler	2	–	6	4	–	7
Marist	2	–	6	3	–	8
Campbell	2	–	6	3	–	8
Valparaiso	0	–	8	0	–	11
+ – Conference co-champions; Rankings from The Sports Network poll

The 2010 Butler Bulldogs football team represented Butler University as a member of the Pioneer Football League (PFL) during the 2010 NCAA Division I FCS football season. Led by sixth-year head coach Jeff Voris, Bulldogs compiled an overall record of 4–7 with a mark of 2–6 in conference play, placing in a three-way tie for seventh place in the PFL. Butler played home games at the Butler Bowl in Indianapolis.

== Schedule ==
Date	Time	Opponent	Site	Result	Attendance	Source
September 4	1:00 pm	at Albion*	Sprankle-Sprandel Stadium; Albion, MI	W 29–13	1,613	
September 11	6:00 pm	at Youngstown State*	Stambaugh Stadium; Youngstown, OH	L 7–31	18,025	
September 18	1:00 pm	Taylor*	Butler Bowl; Indianapolis, IN	W 28–20	4,010	
September 25	9:00 pm	at San Diego	Torero Stadium; San Diego, CA	L 0–24	2,012	
October 2	12:00 pm	Campbell	Butler Bowl; Indianapolis, IN	L 10–27	1,674	
October 9	12:00 pm	at Davidson	Richardson Stadium; Davidson, NC	W 24–8	2,272	
October 16	1:00 pm	Dayton	Butler Bowl; Indianapolis, IN	L 13–33	2,505	
October 23	1:00 pm	Morehead State	Butler Bowl; Indianapolis, IN	L 20–21	5,019	
October 30	2:00 pm	at Valparaiso	Brown Field; Valparaiso, IN (Hoosier Helmet Trophy)	W 48–0	1,072	
November 6	12:00 pm	No. 23 Jacksonville	Butler Bowl; Indianapolis, IN	L 16–24	2,815	
November 13	2:00 pm	at Drake	Drake Stadium; Des Moines, IA	L 7–10	1,598	
*Non-conference game; Rankings from The Sports Network Poll released prior to the game; All times are in Eastern time
