= 2010 Morehead State Eagles football team =

American college football season

2010 Morehead State Eagles football
- Conference: Pioneer Football League
- Record: 5–6 (4–4 PFL)
- Head coach: Matt Ballard (17th season)
- Home stadium: Jayne Stadium

2010 Pioneer Football League standings
	Conf.			Overall
Team	W		L	W		L
No. 22 Jacksonville +	8	–	0	10	–	1
No. 25 Dayton +	8	–	0	10	–	1
Drake	6	–	2	7	–	4
San Diego	5	–	3	5	–	6
Morehead State	4	–	4	5	–	6
Davidson	3	–	5	3	–	8
Butler	2	–	6	4	–	7
Marist	2	–	6	3	–	8
Campbell	2	–	6	3	–	8
Valparaiso	0	–	8	0	–	11
+ – Conference co-champions; Rankings from The Sports Network poll

The 2010 Morehead State Eagles football team represented Morehead State University in the 2010 NCAA Division I FCS football season as a member of the Pioneer Football League (PFL). The Eagles were led by 17th-year head coach Matt Ballard and played their home games at Jayne Stadium. They finished the season 5–6, 4–4 in PFL play.

== Schedule ==
Date	Opponent	Site	Result	Attendance
September 4	at No. 15 James Madison*	Bridgeforth Stadium; Harrisonburg, VA	L 7–48	16,612
September 11	Saint Francis (PA)*	Jayne Stadium; Morehead, KY	W 31–21	5,150
September 18	at Dayton	Welcome Stadium; Dayton, OH	L 28–34	2,740
September 25	at Marist	Tenney Stadium at Leonidoff Field; Poughkeepsie, NY	W 45–39	1,907
October 2	at Georgia State*	Georgia Dome; Atlanta, GA	L 10–37	15,264
October 16	Davidson	Jayne Stadium; Morehead, KY	L 10–17	3,456
October 23	at Butler	Butler Bowl; Indianapolis, IN	W 21–20	5,019
October 30	No. 24 Jacksonville^{†}	Jayne Stadium; Morehead, KY	L 17–61	6,854
November 6	at San Diego	Torero Stadium; San Diego, CA	L 0–34	2,191
November 13	Valparaiso	Jayne Stadium; Morehead, KY	W 37–15	3,007
November 20	Campbell	Jayne Stadium; Morehead, KY	W 30–24 ^{2OT}	2,127
*Non-conference game; ^{†}Homecoming; Rankings from The Sports Network Poll released prior to the game
