= 2010 Maine Black Bears football team =

American college football season

2010 Maine Black Bears football
- Conference: Colonial Athletic Association
- Record: 4–7 (3–4 CAA)
- Head coach: Jack Cosgrove (18th season)
- Captain: Game captains
- Home stadium: Alfond Stadium

2010 Colonial Athletic Association football standings
	Conf.			Overall
Team	W		L	W		L
No. 2 Delaware +^	6	–	2	12	–	3
No. 10 William & Mary +^	6	–	2	8	–	4
No. 3 Villanova ^	5	–	3	9	–	5
No. 7 New Hampshire ^	5	–	3	8	–	5
UMass	4	–	4	6	–	5
Richmond	4	–	4	6	–	5
Rhode Island	4	–	4	5	–	6
James Madison	3	–	5	6	–	5
Maine	3	–	5	4	–	7
Towson	0	–	8	1	–	10
+ – Conference co-champions; ^ – FCS playoff participant; Rankings from The Sports Network poll

The 2010 Maine Black Bears football team was an American football team that represented the University of Maine as a member of the Colonial Athletic Association (CAA) during the 2010 NCAA Division I FCS football season. In their 18th season under head coach Jack Cosgrove, the Black Bears compiled a 4–7 record (3–4 against conference opponents) and tied for eight place in the CAA.

== Schedule ==
Date	Opponent	Site	Result	Attendance	Source
September 2	Albany*	Alfond Stadium; Orono, ME	L 0–3	7,610	
September 11	at Monmouth*	Kessler Field; West Long Branch, NJ	W 31–23	3,830	
September 18	at Syracuse*	Carrier Dome; Syracuse, NY	L 14–38	37,758	
September 25	No. 8 William & Mary	Alfond Stadium; Orono, ME	L 21–24	5,990	
October 2	No. 14 New Hampshire	Alfond Stadium; Orono, ME (Battle for the Brice–Cowell Musket)	W 16–13 ^{OT}	6,531	
October 9	at No. 2 Delaware	Delaware Stadium; Newark, DE	L 7–26	19,523	
October 16	No. 6 Villanova	Alfond Stadium; Orono, ME	L 16–48	5,890	
October 23	at Rhode Island	Meade Stadium; Kingston, RI	W 28–23	4,625	
November 6	at No. 15 UMass	McGuirk Stadium; Hadley, MA	L 24–39	12,121	
November 13	at Towson	Johnny Unitas Stadium; Towson, MD	W 28–18		
November 20	James Madison	Alfond Stadium; Orono, ME	L 10–14	3,880	
*Non-conference game; Rankings from The Sports Network Poll released prior to the game
