= 2010 Delaware Fightin' Blue Hens football team =

American college football season

2010 Delaware Fightin' Blue Hens football

CAA co-champion Lambert Cup winner ECAC Team of the Year

NCAA Division I Championship Game, L 19–20 vs. Eastern Washington
- Conference: Colonial Athletic Association

Ranking
- Sports Network: No. 2
- FCS Coaches: No. 2
- Record: 12–3 (6–2 CAA)
- Head coach: K. C. Keeler (9th season)
- Offensive coordinator: Jim Hofher (2nd season)
- Offensive scheme: Spread
- Defensive coordinator: Nick Rapone (5th season)
- Base defense: 4–3
- Home stadium: Delaware Stadium

2010 Colonial Athletic Association football standings
	Conf.			Overall
Team	W		L	W		L
No. 2 Delaware +^	6	–	2	12	–	3
No. 10 William & Mary +^	6	–	2	8	–	4
No. 3 Villanova ^	5	–	3	9	–	5
No. 7 New Hampshire ^	5	–	3	8	–	5
UMass	4	–	4	6	–	5
Richmond	4	–	4	6	–	5
Rhode Island	4	–	4	5	–	6
James Madison	3	–	5	6	–	5
Maine	3	–	5	4	–	7
Towson	0	–	8	1	–	10
+ – Conference co-champions; ^ – FCS playoff participant; Rankings from The Sports Network poll

The 2010 Delaware Fightin' Blue Hens football team represented the University of Delaware as a member of the Colonial Athletic Association (CAA) during the 2010 NCAA Division I FCS football season. Led by ninth-year head coach K. C. Keeler, the Fightin' Blue Hens compiled an overall record of 12–3 with a mark of 6–2 in conference play, sharing the CAA title with William & Mary. Delaware advanced to the NCAA Division I Football Championship playoffs, where the Fightin' Blue Hens received a first round bye. They beat Lehigh in the second round, New Hampshire in the quarterfinals, and Georgia Southern in the semifinals before losing to Eastern Washington in the NCAA Division I Championship Game, after leading by 19 points late in the third quarter. The team played home games at Delaware Stadium in Newark, Delaware.

Delaware received one vote in the AP Poll following their wins against Towson and UMass.

== Preseason ==
=== Preseason awards ===
- Pat Devlin

Consensus Draft Services Pre-Season NCAA Division I Football Championship Subdivision honorable mention All-American

- Anthony Walters

Consensus Draft Services Pre-Season NCAA Division I Football Championship Subdivision honorable mention All-American

- Anthony Bratton

Preseason All-CAA Football Defense - Safety (as voted on by the head coaches)

== Schedule ==
Date	Time	Opponent	Rank	Site	TV	Result	Attendance	Source
September 2	7:00 pm	No. 21 (D-II) West Chester*	No. 16	Delaware Stadium; Newark, DE (rivalry)		W 31–0	19,421	
September 11	1:00 pm	No. 9 South Dakota State*	No. 16	Delaware Stadium; Newark, DE		W 26–3	19,854	
September 18	6:00 pm	Duquesne*	No. 11	Delaware Stadium; Newark, DE		W 30–6	18,922	
September 25	3:30 pm	at No. 5 Richmond	No. 7	E. Claiborne Robins Stadium; Richmond, VA	CSN	W 34–13	8,700	
October 2	12:00 pm	at No. 3 James Madison	No. 5	Bridgeforth Stadium; Harrisonburg, VA (rivalry)	CSN	W 13–10	16,205	
October 9	1:00 pm	Maine	No. 2	Delaware Stadium; Newark, DE		W 26–7	19,523	
October 16	3:30 pm	Rhode Island	No. 2	Delaware Stadium; Newark, DE (Parents & Family Weekend)		W 24–17	22,576	
October 23	12:00 pm	at No. 4 William & Mary	No. 2	Zable Stadium; Williamsburg, VA (rivalry)	CSN	L 16–17	12,259	
November 6	3:30 pm	Towson^{†}	No. 5	Delaware Stadium; Newark, DE		W 48–0	21,603	
November 13	1:00 pm	at No. 14 UMass	No. 2	Warren McGuirk Alumni Stadium; Amherst, MA		W 45–27	10,057	
November 20	12:00 pm	No. 15 Villanova	No. 1	Delaware Stadium; Newark, DE (Battle of the Blue)	CSN	L 21–28 ^{OT}	22,891	
December 4	12:00 pm	No. 19 Lehigh*	No. 5	Delaware Stadium; Newark, DE (NCAA Division I Second Round, rivalry)	WFMZ	W 42–20	13,649	
December 10	8:00 pm	No. 11 New Hampshire*	No. 5	Delaware Stadium; Newark, DE (NCAA Division I Quarterfinal)	ESPN2	W 16–3	8,770	
December 18	12:00 pm	No. 20 Georgia Southern*	No. 5	Delaware Stadium; Newark, DE (NCAA Division I Semifinal)	ESPNU	W 27–10	10,317	
January 7, 2011	7:00 pm	No. 1 Eastern Washington*	No. 5	Pizza Hut Park; Frisco, TX (NCAA Division I Championship Game)	ESPN2	L 19–20	13,027	
*Non-conference game; ^{†}Homecoming; Rankings from The Sports Network Poll released prior to the game; All times are in Eastern time

Delaware was forced to revise their 2010 schedule when two Colonial Athletic Association opponents, the Northeastern Huskies and the Hofstra Pride, discontinued their football programs after the 2009 season.

== Awards ==
=== Watchlists ===
- Pat Devlin

Walter Payton Award watchlist
Johnny Unitas Golden Arm Award watchlist

=== Postseason ===
- K. C. Keeler (coach)

AFCA FCS Coach of the Year
Liberty Mutual Coach of the Year Award
