= 2010 Dayton Flyers football team =

American college football season

2010 Dayton Flyers football
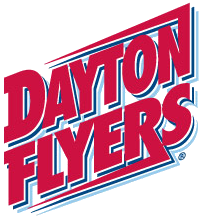

PFL co-champion
- Conference: Pioneer Football League

Ranking
- Sports Network: No. 25
- FCS Coaches: No. 25
- Record: 10–1 (8–0 PFL)
- Head coach: Rick Chamberlin (3rd season)
- Offensive coordinator: Dave Whilding (28th season)
- Defensive coordinator: Landon Fox (1st season)
- Home stadium: Welcome Stadium

2010 Pioneer Football League standings
	Conf.			Overall
Team	W		L	W		L
No. 22 Jacksonville +	8	–	0	10	–	1
No. 25 Dayton +	8	–	0	10	–	1
Drake	6	–	2	7	–	4
San Diego	5	–	3	5	–	6
Morehead State	4	–	4	5	–	6
Davidson	3	–	5	3	–	8
Butler	2	–	6	4	–	7
Marist	2	–	6	3	–	8
Campbell	2	–	6	3	–	8
Valparaiso	0	–	8	0	–	11
+ – Conference co-champions; Rankings from The Sports Network poll

The 2010 Dayton Flyers football team represented the University of Dayton as a member of the Pioneer Football League (PFL) during the 2010 NCAA Division I FCS football season. Led by third-year head coach Rick Chamberlin, the Flyers compiled an overall record of 10–1 with a mark of 8–0 in conference play, sharing the PFL title with Jacksonville. Dayton played home games at Welcome Stadium in Dayton, Ohio.

== Schedule ==
Date	Time	Opponent	Rank	Site	Result	Attendance
September 4	1:00 pm	Robert Morris*		Welcome Stadium; Dayton, OH	W 28–14	3,377
September 11	12:00 pm	at Duquesne*		Arthur J. Rooney Athletic Field; Pittsburgh, PA	L 31–35	1,823
September 18	1:00 pm	Morehead State		Welcome Stadium; Dayton, OH	W 34–28	2,740
September 25	7:00 pm	Central State*		Welcome Stadium; Dayton, OH	W 45–13	5,017
October 2	1:00 pm	Valparaiso		Welcome Stadium; Dayton, OH	W 48–14	4,679
October 9	5:00 pm	at San Diego		Torero Stadium; San Diego, CA	W 21–20	2,886
October 16	1:00 pm	at Butler		Butler Bowl; Indianapolis, IN	W 33–13	2,505
October 23	1:00 pm	Campbell		Welcome Stadium; Dayton, OH	W 41–23	2,180
October 30	1:00 pm	at Davidson		Richardson Stadium; Davidson, NC	W 37–13	4,263
November 6	1:00 pm	Drake		Welcome Stadium; Dayton, OH (rivalry)	W 31–25	1,723
November 13	12:00 pm	at Marist	No. 24	Tenney Stadium at Leonidoff Field; Poughkeepsie, NY	W 41–34 ^{2OT}	1,942
*Non-conference game; Rankings from The Sports Network Poll released prior to the game; All times are in Eastern time
