= Joe Trainer =

American football player and coach (born 1968)

Biographical details
- Born: March 6, 1968 (age 58)

Playing career
- 1986–1989: Dickinson

Coaching career (HC unless noted)
- 1990–1991: Temple (GA)
- 1992: Frostburg State (ST)
- 1993–1994: Colgate (LB/ST)
- 1995–1996: New Haven (DC/LB)
- 1997–2004: Villanova (DC/LB)
- 2005–2007: Millersville
- 2008: Rhode Island (DC)
- 2009–2013: Rhode Island
- 2014–2018: Villanova (ST/DL)

Administrative career (AD unless noted)
- 2019–2022: Pope John Paul II HS (PA)

Head coaching record
- Overall: 25–64

Joe Trainer (born March 6, 1968) is an American former football coach and athletics administrator. He served as head football coach at Millersville University of Pennsylvania from 2005 to 2007 and the University of Rhode Island from 2009 to 2013, compiling a career college football head coaching record of 25–64. Trainer was the defensive coordinator for Villanova University from 2014 to 2018.

Trainer is a native of Roslyn, Pennsylvania. He joined Pope John Paul II High School in Royersford, Pennsylvania as their athletic director before stepping down in 2022. After being the athletic director for four years he stepped down to become a school counselor at La Salle College High School in Wyndmoor, Pennsylvania.

== Head coaching record ==
Year	Team	Overall	Conference	Standing	Bowl/playoffs
Millersville Marauders (Pennsylvania State Athletic Conference) (2005–2007)
2005	Millersville	5–6	3–3	4th (Eastern)	
2006	Millersville	5–6	3–3	4th (Eastern)	
2007	Millersville	3–8	2–3	T–3rd (Eastern)	
Millersville:		13–20	8–9		
Rhode Island Rams (Colonial Athletic Association) (2009–2013)
2009	Rhode Island	1–10	0–8	12th	
2010	Rhode Island	5–6	4–4	7th	
2011	Rhode Island	3–8	2–6	8th	
2012	Rhode Island	0–11	0–8	10th	
2013	Rhode Island	3–9	2–6	10th	
Rhode Island:		12–44	8–32		
Total:		25–64			
