= 2010 Jacksonville Dolphins football team =

American college football team

2010 Jacksonville Dolphins football
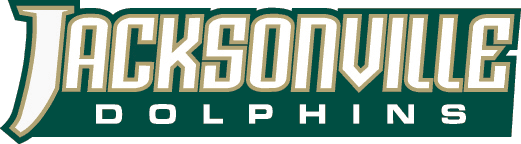

PFL co-champion
- Conference: Pioneer Football League

Ranking
- Sports Network: No. 22
- FCS Coaches: No. 22
- Record: 10–1 (8–0 PFL)
- Head coach: Kerwin Bell (4th season)
- Defensive coordinator: Jerry Odom (1st season)
- Home stadium: D. B. Milne Field

2010 Pioneer Football League standings
	Conf.			Overall
Team	W		L	W		L
No. 22 Jacksonville +	8	–	0	10	–	1
No. 25 Dayton +	8	–	0	10	–	1
Drake	6	–	2	7	–	4
San Diego	5	–	3	5	–	6
Morehead State	4	–	4	5	–	6
Davidson	3	–	5	3	–	8
Butler	2	–	6	4	–	7
Marist	2	–	6	3	–	8
Campbell	2	–	6	3	–	8
Valparaiso	0	–	8	0	–	11
+ – Conference co-champions; Rankings from The Sports Network poll

The 2010 Jacksonville Dolphins football team represented Jacksonville University in the 2010 NCAA Division I FCS football season. The Dolphins were led by fourth-year head coach Kerwin Bell and played their home games at D. B. Milne Field. They were a member of the Pioneer Football League. They finished the season 10–1, 8–0 in PFL play to finish tied for first place. They won their second PFL Championship in school history.

== Schedule ==
Date	Time	Opponent	Rank	Site	Result	Attendance
September 4	6:00 p.m.	at Old Dominion*		Foreman Field; Norfolk, VA	W 35–25	19,782
September 11	3:30 p.m.	at No. 3 Appalachian State*		Kidd Brewer Stadium; Boone, NC	L 14–45	28,708
September 18	7:00 p.m.	Webber International*		Skinner-Barco Stadium; Jacksonville, FL	W 41–0	4,130
September 25	1:00 p.m.	at Davidson		Richardson Stadium; Davidson, NC	W 42–15	2,362
October 2	12:00 p.m.	San Diego		D. B. Milne Field; Jacksonville, FL	W 35–28	2,438
October 9	12:00 p.m.	Drake		D. B. Milne Field; Jacksonville, FL	W 39–34	2,843
October 16	1:00 p.m.	at Valparaiso		Brown Field; Valparaiso, IN	W 86–7	893
October 23	12:00 p.m.	Marist^{†}		D. B. Milne Field; Jacksonville, FL	W 56–14	4,233
October 30	2:00 p.m.	at Morehead State	No. 24	Jayne Stadium; Morehead, KY	W 61–17	6,854
November 6	12:00 p.m.	at Butler	No. 23	Butler Bowl; Indianapolis, IN	W 23–16	2,815
November 13	12:00 p.m.	Campbell	No. 22	D. B. Milne Field; Jacksonville, FL	W 31–24	5,160
*Non-conference game; ^{†}Homecoming; Rankings from The Sports Network FCS Poll released prior to game Poll released prior to the game; All times are in Eastern time
