= 2010 NCAA Division I FCS football season =

American college football season

2010 NCAA Division I FCS season

Regular season
- Number of teams: 124
- Duration: September – November
- Payton Award: Jeremy Moses, Stephen F. Austin
- Buchanan Award: J. C. Sherritt, Eastern Washington

Playoff
- Duration: November 27 – December 18
- Championship date: January 7, 2011
- Championship site: Pizza Hut Park, Frisco, Texas
- Champion: Eastern Washington

NCAA Division I FCS football seasons
- «2009 2011»

The 2010 NCAA Division I FCS football season, the 2010 season of college football for teams in the Football Championship Subdivision (FCS), began in September 2010 and concluded with the 2011 NCAA Division I Football Championship Game on January 7, 2011. In the title game, Eastern Washington defeated Delaware, 20–19, to claim their first Division I national title in any team sport.

For the first time since 1997, the final game was played at a new location—Pizza Hut Park in the Dallas suburb of Frisco, Texas. Every title game since 1997 had been held at Finley Stadium in Chattanooga, Tennessee, but the NCAA opened the hosting rights for the 2010–2012 championship games for bids during the 2009 season, as the hosting contract between the NCAA and the Chattanooga organizers was set to expire. In addition to Frisco and Chattanooga, three other cities submitted bids:

- Little Rock, Arkansas — War Memorial Stadium
- Missoula, Montana — Washington–Grizzly Stadium
- Spokane, Washington — Joe Albi Stadium

The field of bidders was eventually cut to Chattanooga and Frisco, with Frisco being announced as the winner on February 26, 2010.

The January finish to the season was the result of an expanded playoff schedule. The championship tournament expanded from 16 teams to 20, with the Big South and Northeast Conference earning automatic bids for the first time. Eight teams played first-round games, with the remaining participants receiving byes into the second round. The playoffs began at their normal time on Thanksgiving weekend, specifically on November 27. According to early reports, the championship game would be played sometime between December 29 and January 7, with the latter date ultimately chosen.

== Conference changes and new programs ==
School	2009 conference	2010 conference
Georgia State	New program	FCS Independent
Hofstra	CAA	Dropped program
Lamar	Revived program	FCS Independent
North Carolina Central	FCS Independent	MEAC
Northeastern	CAA	Dropped program
Savannah State	FCS independent	MEAC
Winston-Salem State	FCS independent	CIAA (D-II)

== FCS team wins over FBS teams ==
September 4 – Jacksonville State 49, Ole Miss 48 ^{2OT}
September 4 – North Dakota State 6, Kansas 3
September 11 – James Madison 21, No. 13 Virginia Tech 16 (NOTE: This was only the second win by an FCS school over a ranked FBS team, after Appalachian State's historic win over Michigan in 2007).
September 11 – Gardner–Webb 38, Akron 37 ^{OT}
September 11 – Liberty 27, Ball State 23
September 11 – South Dakota 41, Minnesota 38
October 2 – UC Davis 14, San Jose State 13

== Conference standings ==
2010 Big Sky Conference football standings
	Conf.			Overall
Team	W		L	W		L
No. 1 Eastern Washington +^	7	–	1	13	–	2
No. 11 Montana State +^	7	–	1	9	–	3
No. 20 Montana	5	–	3	7	–	4
Weber State	5	–	3	6	–	5
Sacramento State	5	–	3	6	–	5
Northern Arizona	4	–	4	6	–	5
Northern Colorado	2	–	6	3	–	8
Portland State	1	–	7	2	–	9
Idaho State	0	–	8	1	–	10
$ – Conference champion; ^ – FCS playoff participant; Rankings from The Sports Network poll

2010 Big South Conference football standings
	Conf.			Overall
Team	W		L	W		L
No. 21 Liberty +	5	–	1	8	–	3
Stony Brook +	5	–	1	6	–	5
Coastal Carolina +^	5	–	1	6	–	6
Gardner–Webb	2	–	4	4	–	7
VMI	2	–	4	3	–	8
Charleston Southern	1	–	5	3	–	8
Presbyterian	1	–	5	2	–	9
$ – Conference champion; ^ – FCS playoff participant; Rankings from The Sports Network poll

2010 Colonial Athletic Association football standings
	Conf.			Overall
Team	W		L	W		L
No. 2 Delaware +^	6	–	2	12	–	3
No. 10 William & Mary +^	6	–	2	8	–	4
No. 3 Villanova ^	5	–	3	9	–	5
No. 7 New Hampshire ^	5	–	3	8	–	5
UMass	4	–	4	6	–	5
Richmond	4	–	4	6	–	5
Rhode Island	4	–	4	5	–	6
James Madison	3	–	5	6	–	5
Maine	3	–	5	4	–	7
Towson	0	–	8	1	–	10
+ – Conference co-champions; ^ – FCS playoff participant; Rankings from The Sports Network poll

2010 Great West Conference football standings
	Conf.			Overall
Team	W		L	W		L
Southern Utah $	4	–	0	6	–	5
UC Davis	3	–	1	6	–	5
No. 24 Cal Poly	2	–	2	7	–	4
South Dakota	1	–	3	4	–	7
North Dakota	0	–	4	3	–	8
$ – Conference champion; Rankings from The Sports Network poll

2010 Ivy League football standings
	Conf.			Overall
Team	W		L	W		L
No. 18 Penn $	7	–	0	9	–	1
Harvard	5	–	2	7	–	3
Yale	5	–	2	7	–	3
Brown	5	–	2	6	–	4
Dartmouth	3	–	4	6	–	4
Columbia	2	–	5	4	–	6
Cornell	1	–	6	2	–	8
Princeton	0	–	7	1	–	9
$ – Conference champion; Rankings from The Sports Network poll

2010 Mid-Eastern Athletic Conference football standings
	Conf.			Overall
Team	W		L	W		L
No. 15 Bethune–Cookman +^	7	–	1	10	–	2
No. 16 South Carolina State +^	7	–	1	9	–	3
Florida A&M +	7	–	1	8	–	3
Hampton	5	–	3	6	–	5
Norfolk State	4	–	4	6	–	5
Morgan State	3	–	5	4	–	7
Delaware State	2	–	6	3	–	8
North Carolina A&T	1	–	7	1	–	10
Howard	0	–	8	1	–	10
North Carolina Central *	0	–	0	3	–	8
Savannah State *	0	–	0	1	–	10
+ – Conference co-champions; ^ – FCS playoff participant; * Not eligible for conference championship; Rankings from The Sports Network poll

2010 Missouri Valley Football Conference standings
	Conf.			Overall
Team	W		L	W		L
No. 19 Northern Iowa $^	6	–	2	7	–	5
No. 17 Western Illinois ^	5	–	3	8	–	5
No. 9 North Dakota State ^	4	–	4	9	–	5
Indiana State	4	–	4	6	–	5
Illinois State	4	–	4	6	–	5
South Dakota State	4	–	4	5	–	6
Missouri State	4	–	4	5	–	6
Southern Illinois	4	–	4	5	–	6
Youngstown State	1	–	7	3	–	8
$ – Conference champion; ^ – FCS playoff participant; Rankings from The Sports Network poll

2010 Northeast Conference football standings
	Conf.			Overall
Team	W		L	W		L
Robert Morris +^	7	–	1	8	–	3
Central Connecticut State +	7	–	1	8	–	3
Duquesne	5	–	3	7	–	4
Bryant	4	–	4	7	–	4
Albany	4	–	4	6	–	5
Wagner	3	–	5	5	–	6
Monmouth	3	–	5	3	–	8
Sacred Heart	2	–	6	4	–	7
Saint Francis (PA)	1	–	7	1	–	10
+ – Conference co-champions; ^ – FCS playoff participant

2010 Ohio Valley Conference football standings
	Conf.			Overall
Team	W		L	W		L
No. 13 Southeast Missouri State $^	7	–	1	9	–	3
No. 12 Jacksonville State ^	6	–	2	9	–	3
Eastern Kentucky	5	–	2	6	–	5
Murray State	5	–	3	6	–	5
UT Martin	5	–	3	6	–	5
Tennessee Tech	4	–	4	5	–	6
Eastern Illinois	2	–	6	2	–	9
Austin Peay	1	–	7	2	–	9
Tennessee State	0	–	7	3	–	8
$ – Conference champion; ^ – FCS playoff participant; Rankings from The Sports Network poll

2010 Patriot League football standings
	Conf.			Overall
Team	W		L	W		L
No. 14 Lehigh $^	5	–	0	10	–	3
Colgate	3	–	2	7	–	4
Holy Cross	3	–	2	6	–	5
Georgetown	2	–	3	4	–	7
Lafayette	1	–	4	2	–	9
Bucknell	1	–	4	1	–	10
Fordham	0	–	0	5	–	6
$ – Conference champion; ^ – FCS playoff participant; Rankings from The Sports Network poll

2010 Pioneer Football League standings
	Conf.			Overall
Team	W		L	W		L
No. 22 Jacksonville +	8	–	0	10	–	1
No. 25 Dayton +	8	–	0	10	–	1
Drake	6	–	2	7	–	4
San Diego	5	–	3	5	–	6
Morehead State	4	–	4	5	–	6
Davidson	3	–	5	3	–	8
Butler	2	–	6	4	–	7
Marist	2	–	6	3	–	8
Campbell	2	–	6	3	–	8
Valparaiso	0	–	8	0	–	11
+ – Conference co-champions; Rankings from The Sports Network poll

2010 Southern Conference football standings
	Conf.			Overall
Team	W		L	W		L
No. 4 Appalachian State +^	7	–	1	10	–	3
No. 6 Wofford +^	7	–	1	10	–	3
No. 5 Georgia Southern ^	5	–	3	10	–	5
Chattanooga	5	–	3	6	–	5
Elon	5	–	3	6	–	5
Furman	3	–	5	5	–	6
Samford	2	–	6	4	–	7
The Citadel	1	–	7	3	–	8
Western Carolina	1	–	7	2	–	9
+ – Conference co-champions; ^ – FCS playoff participant; Rankings from The Sports Network poll

2010 Southland Conference football standings
	Conf.			Overall
Team	W		L	W		L
No. 8 Stephen F. Austin $^	6	–	1	9	–	3
McNeese State	5	–	2	6	–	5
Central Arkansas	4	–	3	7	–	4
Sam Houston State	4	–	3	6	–	5
Northwestern State	4	–	3	5	–	6
Nicholls State	3	–	4	4	–	7
Texas State	1	–	6	4	–	7
Southeastern Louisiana	1	–	6	2	–	9
$ – Conference champion; ^ – FCS playoff participant; Rankings from The Sports Network poll

2010 Southwestern Athletic Conference football standings
	Conf.			Overall
Team	W		L	W		L
East Division
Alabama State xy	6	–	3	7	–	5
Jackson State x	6	–	3	8	–	3
Alcorn State	4	–	5	5	–	6
Alabama A&M	2	–	7	3	–	8
Mississippi Valley State	0	–	9	0	–	10
West Division
Texas Southern xy$	8	–	1	9	–	3
No. 23 Grambling State x	8	–	1	9	–	2
Prairie View A&M	6	–	3	7	–	4
Arkansas–Pine Bluff	4	–	5	5	–	6
Southern	1	–	8	2	–	9
Championship: Texas Southern 11, Alabama State 6
$ – Conference champion; x – Division champion/co-champions; y – Championship game participant; Rankings from The Sports Network Poll

2010 NCAA Division I FCS independents football standings
	Conf.			Overall
Team	W		L	W		L
Old Dominion		–		8	–	3
Georgia State		–		6	–	5
Lamar		–		5	–	6

== Conference summaries ==
=== Championship games ===
Conference	Champion	Runner-up	Score	Offensive Player of the Year	Defensive Player of the Year	Coach of the Year
SWAC	Texas Southern	Alabama State	11–6	Frank Warren (RB, Grambling State)	DeJuan Fulghum (LB, Texas Southern)	Johnnie Cole (Texas Southern)

=== Other conference winners ===
Note: Records are regular-season only, and do not include playoff games.

Conference	Champion	Record	Offensive Player of the Year	Defensive Player of the Year	Coach of the Year
Big Sky	Eastern Washington; Montana State	9–2 (7–1)	Taiwan Jones (Eastern Washington); DeNarius McGhee (Montana State)	J. C. Sherritt (Eastern Washington)	Rob Ash (Montana State)
Big South	Liberty; Stony Brook; Coastal Carolina	8–3 (5–1); 6–5 (5–1); 6–5 (5–1)	Mike Brown (Liberty)	Andrae Jacobs (Coastal Carolina)	David Bennett (Coastal Carolina)
CAA	Delaware; William & Mary	9–2 (6–2); 8–3 (6–2)	Pat Devlin (Delaware)	Tyler Holmes (UMass); Eric McBride (Richmond)	Joe Trainer (Rhode Island)
Great West	Southern Utah	6–5 (4–0)	Tysson Poots (Southern Utah)	Marty Mohamed (Cal Poly)	Ed Lamb (Southern Utah)
Ivy	Penn	9–1 (7–0)	Nick Schwieger (Dartmouth); Gino Gordon (Harvard)		
MEAC	Bethune–Cookman; South Carolina State; Florida A&M	10–1 (7–1); 9–2 (7–1); 8–3 (7–1)	Matt Johnson (Bethune–Cookman)	David Erby (South Carolina State)	Brian Jenkins (Bethune–Cookman)
MVFC	Northern Iowa	7–4 (6–2)	Matt Barr (Western Illinois)	Kyle Glazier (Western Illinois)	Trent Miles (Indiana State)
NEC	Robert Morris; Central Connecticut State	8–2 (7–1); 8–3 (7–1)	Myles Russ (Robert Morris)	Alex DiMichele (Robert Morris)	Joe Walton (Robert Morris)
OVC	Southeast Missouri State	9–2 (7–1)	Henry Harris (Southeast Missouri State)	Andrew Soucy (Eastern Kentucky)	Tony Samuel (Southeast Missouri State)
Patriot	Lehigh	9–2 (5–0)	Nate Eachus (Colgate)	Zach Smith (Colgate)	Andy Coen (Lehigh)
Pioneer	Jacksonville; Dayton	10–1 (8–0)	Steve Valentino (Dayton)	Dain Taylor (Drake)	Rick Chamberlin (Dayton)
Southern	Appalachian State; Wofford	9–2 (6–1)	De'Andre Presley (Appalachian State)	Ameet Pall (Wofford)	Jerry Moore (Appalachian State)
Southland	Stephen F. Austin	11–0 (7–0)	Jeremy Moses (Stephen F. Austin)	Jabara Williams (Stephen F. Austin)	J. C. Harper (Stephen F. Austin)

== Playoff qualifiers ==
=== Automatic berths for conference champions ===
- Big Sky Conference – Montana State
- Big South Conference – Coastal Carolina
- Colonial Athletic Association – William & Mary
- Missouri Valley Football Conference – Northern Iowa
- Mid-Eastern Athletic Conference – Bethune–Cookman
- Northeast Conference – Robert Morris
- Ohio Valley Conference – Southeast Missouri State
- Patriot League – Lehigh
- Southern Conference – Appalachian State
- Southland Conference – Stephen F. Austin

=== At large qualifiers ===
- Big Sky Conference – Eastern Washington
- Colonial Athletic Association – Delaware
- Colonial Athletic Association – New Hampshire
- Colonial Athletic Association – Villanova
- Mid-Eastern Athletic Conference – South Carolina State
- Missouri Valley Football Conference – North Dakota State
- Missouri Valley Football Conference – Western Illinois
- Ohio Valley Conference – Jacksonville State
- Southern Conference – Georgia Southern
- Southern Conference – Wofford

No teams from the conferences that do not have automatic bids—currently the Great West Conference and Pioneer Football League—received bids. In order for a team from a conference without an automatic bid to be eligible for the playoffs, it must have a minimum of seven Division I wins, with at least two against teams in automatic bid conferences. The team in question also must be ranked an average of 16 or better in the national rankings.

=== Abstentions ===
- Ivy League – Pennsylvania
- Southwestern Athletic Conference – Texas Southern

(Overall Record, Conference Record)

== Postseason ==
After 24 seasons with a playoff field of sixteen teams, the FCS bracket was expanded to twenty this postseason, with the five seeded teams and seven others receiving first-round byes. The championship game was moved to January, three weeks after the mid-December semifinals.

The FCS playoff field was twenty for three seasons, then expanded to 24 in 2013.

=== NCAA Division I playoff bracket ===
First Round
November 27
Campus sites

Second Round
December 4
Campus sites

Quarterfinals
December 10 and 11
Campus sites

Semifinals
December 17 and 18
Campus sites

National Championship Game

January 7
Pizza Hut Park, Frisco, Texas

Western Illinois
14

Western Illinois
17

1
Appalachian State*
42

Coastal Carolina*
10

1
Appalachian State*
24

Villanova
42

Villanova
54

Stephen F. Austin*
24

Villanova
31

5
Eastern Washington*
41

North Dakota State
42

Robert Morris
17

4
Montana State*
17

North Dakota State*
43

North Dakota State
31

5
Eastern Washington*
38

SE Missouri State
17

5
Eastern Washington*
37

5
Eastern Washington
20

3
Delaware
19

Georgia Southern
31

South Carolina State
16

2
William & Mary*
15

Georgia Southern*
41

Georgia Southern
23

Wofford*
20

Wofford
17

Jacksonville State*
14

Georgia Southern
10

3
Delaware*
27

Lehigh
20

Lehigh
14

3
Delaware*
42

Northern Iowa*
7

3
Delaware*
16

New Hampshire
3

New Hampshire
45

Bethune–Cookman*
20

* Home team

=== SWAC Championship Game ===
Date	Location	Venue	West Div. Champion	East Div. Champion	Result
December 11	Birmingham, Alabama	Legion Field	Texas Southern	Alabama State	TSU 11 – ASU 6

=== Global Kilimanjaro Bowl ===
On September 1, 2010, Drake University announced it would participate in the Global Kilimanjaro Bowl, the first American football game played on the continent of Africa. The game featured the Drake Bulldogs versus Mexican All-Star team CONADEIP. Due to the seasonal difference in Africa, the Global Kilimanjaro Bowl was played on May 21, 2011.

Date	Location	Venue	Mexican Team	USA Team	Result
May 21, 2011	Arusha, Tanzania	Sheikh Amri Abeid Memorial Stadium	CONADEIP Stars	Drake Bulldogs	Drake 17 – CONADEIP 7

== Final poll standings ==
Standings are from The Sports Network final poll.

Rank	Team	Record
1	Eastern Washington Eagles	13–2
2	Delaware Fightin' Blue Hens	12–3
3	Villanova Wildcats	9–5
4	Appalachian State Mountaineers	10–3
5	Georgia Southern Eagles	10–5
6	Wofford Terriers	10–3
7	New Hampshire Wildcats	8–5
8	Stephen F. Austin Lumberjacks	9–3
9	North Dakota State Bison	9–5
10	William & Mary Tribe	8–4
11	Montana State Bobcats	9–3
12	Jacksonville State Gamecocks	9–3
13	Southeast Missouri State Redhawks	9–3
14	Lehigh Mountain Hawks	10–3
15	Bethune–Cookman Wildcats	10–2
16	South Carolina State Bulldogs	9–3
17	Western Illinois Leathernecks	8–5
18	Penn Quakers	9–1
19	Northern Iowa Panthers	7–5
20	Montana Grizzlies	7–4
21	Liberty Flames	8–3
22	Jacksonville Dolphins	10–1
23	Grambling State Tigers	9–2
24	Cal Poly Mustangs	7–4
25	Dayton Flyers	10–1

Standings are from the FCS Coaches final poll.

Rank	Team	Record
1	Eastern Washington Eagles	13–2
2	Delaware Fightin' Blue Hens	12–3
3	Villanova Wildcats	9–5
4	Appalachian State Mountaineers	10–3
5	Wofford Terriers	10–3
6	Georgia Southern Eagles	10–5
7	New Hampshire Wildcats	8–5
8	William & Mary Tribe	8–4
9	North Dakota State Bison	9–5
10	Stephen F. Austin Lumberjacks	9–3
11	Montana State Bobcats	9–3
12	Jacksonville State Gamecocks	9–3
13	Southeast Missouri State Redhawks	9–3
14	Lehigh Mountain Hawks	10–3
15	Bethune–Cookman Wildcats	10–2
16	Penn Quakers	9–1
17	South Carolina State Bulldogs	9–3
18	Northern Iowa Panthers	7–5
19	Liberty Flames	8–3
20	Western Illinois Leathernecks	8–5
21	Montana Grizzlies	7–4
22	Jacksonville Dolphins	10–1
23	Cal Poly Mustangs	7–4
24	Grambling State Tigers	9–2
25	Dayton Flyers	10–1
