= 2010 UMass Minutemen football team =

American college football season

2010 UMass Minutemen football
- Conference: Colonial Athletic Association
- Record: 6–5 (4–4 CAA)
- Head coach: Kevin Morris (2nd season)
- Offensive coordinator: Brian Picucci (2nd season)
- Offensive scheme: Pro-style
- Defensive coordinator: Keith Dudzinski (7th season)
- Base defense: 4–3
- Home stadium: Warren McGuirk Alumni Stadium

2010 Colonial Athletic Association football standings
	Conf.			Overall
Team	W		L	W		L
No. 2 Delaware +^	6	–	2	12	–	3
No. 10 William & Mary +^	6	–	2	8	–	4
No. 3 Villanova ^	5	–	3	9	–	5
No. 7 New Hampshire ^	5	–	3	8	–	5
UMass	4	–	4	6	–	5
Richmond	4	–	4	6	–	5
Rhode Island	4	–	4	5	–	6
James Madison	3	–	5	6	–	5
Maine	3	–	5	4	–	7
Towson	0	–	8	1	–	10
+ – Conference co-champions; ^ – FCS playoff participant; Rankings from The Sports Network poll

The 2010 UMass Minutemen football team represented the University of Massachusetts Amherst in the 2010 NCAA Division I FCS football season as a member of the Colonial Athletic Association. The team was coached by Kevin Morris and played its home games at Warren McGuirk Alumni Stadium in Hadley, Massachusetts. The Minutemen played their road opener on September 18 against the Michigan Wolverines at Michigan Stadium in a game that drew the largest crowd ever to attend a UMass football game. UMass also played their first game in program history at Gillette Stadium, their future home beginning in 2012, on October 23 in the Colonial Clash against New Hampshire. The team finished with a record of 6–5, 4–4 in CAA play.

== Schedule ==
Date	Time	Opponent	Rank	Site	TV	Result	Attendance
September 4	3:30 p.m.	No. 4 William & Mary		McGuirk Stadium; Hadley, MA	CSNNE	W 27–23	10,072
September 11	6:00 p.m.	Holy Cross*	No. 18	McGuirk Stadium; Hadley, MA	WSHM	W 31–7	16,352
September 18	12:00 p.m.	at No. 20 (AP/FBS) Michigan*	No. 16	Michigan Stadium; Ann Arbor, MI	BTN	L 37–42	110,187
September 25	6:00 p.m.	at Stony Brook*	No. 11	LaValle Stadium; Stony Brook, NY		W 26–21	5,309
October 2	7:00 p.m.	at Towson	No. 8	Unitas Stadium; Towson, MD		W 27–14	5,560
October 16	3:30 p.m.	No. 20 Richmond^{†}	No. 8	McGuirk Stadium; Hadley, MA	WSHM	L 10–11	16,421
October 23	3:30 p.m.	vs. No. 10 New Hampshire	No. 12	Gillette Stadium; Foxboro, MA (Colonial Clash)	CSNNE	L 13–39	32,848
October 30	3:30 p.m.	at No. 15 James Madison	No. 18	Bridgeforth Stadium; Harrisonburg, VA	CSNNE	W 21–14	16,664
November 6	3:30 p.m.	Maine	No. 15	McGuirk Stadium; Hadley, MA	CSNNE	W 39–24	12,121
November 13	1:00 p.m.	No. 2 Delaware	No. 14	McGuirk Stadium; Hadley, MA	WSHM	L 27–45	10,057
November 20	12:30 p.m.	at Rhode Island	No. 19	Meade Stadium; Kingston, RI		L 34–37	3,156
*Non-conference game; ^{†}Homecoming; Rankings from The Sports Network Poll released prior to the game; All times are in Eastern time

== Roster ==
2010 UMass Minutemen roster
**Quarterbacks**: 3 Ian Shultis, So; 7 Brandon Hill, Fr; 12 Kyle Havens, Sr; 14 Raymond Pendagast, Fr; 17 Jesse Hunt, RS Fr; **Tailbacks**: 5 Jamar Smith, RS Fr; 22 Jonathan Hernandez, RS Jr; 24 Mike Delaney, Fr; 28 John Griffin, Sr; 43 Alan Williams, RS So; **Fullbacks**: 26 Thad McCummings, RS Fr; 40 Scott Duggan, RS Sr; **Wide receivers**: 1 Julian Talley, RS Jr; 2 Anthony Nelson, Sr; 15 Shawn Campbell, Fr; 16 Jesse Julmiste, Jr; 18 Tom Gilson, RS Jr; 20 Dan Sheeran, RS Sr; 48 Calvin Belfon, Sr; 81 Julian Colarusso, RS So; 84 Dominic Wooten, Fr; 86 Dominique Price, RS Jr; 88 James Lizotte, So; 89 Aaron Fears, RS Sr; **Tight ends**: 80 Nick Jablonski, RS Fr; 82 Andrew Krevis, RS Sr; 83 **Emil Igwenagu**, RS Jr; 87 Rob Blanchflower, RS Fr	**Offensive linemen**: 50 Josh Samuda, RS Jr; 51 Quinton Sales, RS So; 61 John Ihne, RS Sr; 64 Nicholas Gottshall, RS So; 66 Anthony Dima, RS Fr; 67 Brian Ostaszewski, RS Jr; 68 Mike Kahale, Fr; 70 Greg Niland, RS Sr; 71 Ryan Young, Fr; 72 Nick Speller, RS So; 73 Jeff Skoog, Fr; 74 Stephane Milhim, RS So; 75 John Moran, RS So; 77 Travis Poston, RS So; 78 Sean O'Connor, RS So; 79 Vincent Westcam, RS Fr; 85 Travis Tripurka, RS Jr; **Defensive linemen**: 49 Galen Clemons, RS Fr; 52 Bill Besselt, RS Fr; 57 Matt Heilig, Fr; 59 Giddens Rateau, RS Fr; 62 Brandon Flanagan, RS Sr; 63 Kevin Byrne, RS Fr; 76 Tyler Major, RS Fr; 90 Theo Agnew, RS Fr; 91 Courtney Jackson, RS Jr; 93 Bob McLaughlin, RS Sr; 95 Brandon Potvin, RS Fr; 98 Daniel Maynes, Fr; 99 Charles Thompson, RS So	**Linebackers**: 25 Matt Campbell, Fr; 33 Mike Mele, Sr; 35 Stanley Andre, Fr; 36 **Tyler Holmes**, Jr; 37 Tom Brandt, RS Fr; 42 Devin Lindsey, RS Fr; 44 Perry McIntyre, So; 46 Chad Hunte, So; 47 Tim Brandt, RS Fr; 53 D.J. Abeoba, RS So; 54 David Ramsden, RS Jr; 55 Ryan Delaire, Fr; **Defensive backs**: 4 Torrey Esalomi, RS Sr; 6 Antoine Tharpe, Fr; 8 Mike Lee, RS Fr; 9 Christian Birt, RS Fr; 11 Ke'Mon Bailey, RS Sr; 13 David Cozzo, RS Sr; 19 Woody Carter IV, Jr; 21 Kirk Nelms, Fr; 23 Shane Viveiros, RS Jr; 27 Darren Thellen, RS So; 29 Ryan Carter, RS Fr; 31 Ed Saint-Vil, Fr; 32 Ryan Collins, Fr; 34 Kumar Davis, RS So; 39 James Carven, RS Sr	**Kickers**: 30 Igor Garcia **K**, Fr; 41 Jeff Strait **P**, RS Fr; 92 Jeffrey Lingenfelter **P/WR**, RS Fr; 94 Caleb Violette **K/P**, So; 96 Brendon Levengood **K/P**, RS Fr; Classes Key: Fr – Freshman; first year player. So – Sophomore; second year player. Jr – Junior; third year player. Sr – Senior; fourth year player. **Bold** – Team captain. RS – Used a redshirt this season or previously. Roster
