= 2010 Richmond Spiders football team =

American college football season

2010 Richmond Spiders football
- Conference: Colonial Athletic Association
- Record: 6–5 (4–4 CAA)
- Head coach: Latrell Scott (1st season)
- Offensive coordinator: Wayne Lineburg (1st season)
- Defensive coordinator: Bob Trott (1st season)
- Home stadium: E. Claiborne Robins Stadium

2010 Colonial Athletic Association football standings
	Conf.			Overall
Team	W		L	W		L
No. 2 Delaware +^	6	–	2	12	–	3
No. 10 William & Mary +^	6	–	2	8	–	4
No. 3 Villanova ^	5	–	3	9	–	5
No. 7 New Hampshire ^	5	–	3	8	–	5
UMass	4	–	4	6	–	5
Richmond	4	–	4	6	–	5
Rhode Island	4	–	4	5	–	6
James Madison	3	–	5	6	–	5
Maine	3	–	5	4	–	7
Towson	0	–	8	1	–	10
+ – Conference co-champions; ^ – FCS playoff participant; Rankings from The Sports Network poll

The 2010 Richmond Spiders football team represented the University of Richmond during the 2010 NCAA Division I FCS football season. Richmond competed as a member of the Colonial Athletic Association (CAA) under first-year head football coach Latrell Scott and played its home games at the new E. Claiborne Robins Stadium. The 2010 campaign came on the heels of an NCAA Division I FCS national championship in 2008 and a quarterfinal appearance in 2009.

In the Colonial Athletic Association preseason poll, the Spiders were picked to finish 6th in the conference. Nationally, the preseason poll from The Sports Network ranked Richmond 6th.

== Schedule ==
Richmond's 2010 schedule kicked off against Football Bowl Subdivision (FBS) team Virginia and includes other non-conference games against Elon and Coastal Carolina. The schedule also included an eight-game CAA slate wrapping up against rival William & Mary in the Capital Cup.

Date	Time	Opponent	Rank	Site	TV	Result	Attendance
September 4	6:00 pm	at Virginia*	No. 6	Scott Stadium; Charlottesville, VA	ESPN3	L 13–34	54,146
September 18	1:00 pm	No. 7 Elon*	No. 9	Robins Stadium; Richmond, VA		W 27–21 ^{OT}	8,700
September 25	3:30 pm	No. 7 Delaware	No. 5	Robins Stadium; Richmond, VA	CSN	L 13–34	8,700
October 2	1:00 pm	Coastal Carolina*	No. 11	Robins Stadium; Richmond, VA		W 41–19	8,464
October 9	12:00 pm	at No. 22 New Hampshire	No. 11	Cowell Stadium; Durham, NH	CSN	L 0–17	12,095
October 16	3:30 pm	at No. 8 UMass	No. 20	Warren McGuirk Alumni Stadium; Hadley, MA		W 11–10	16,421
October 23	3:30 pm	Towson^{†}	No. 16	Robins Stadium; Richmond, VA		W 28–6	8,700
October 30	12:00 pm	at No. 5 Villanova	No. 14	Villanova Stadium; Villanova, PA	CSN	L 7–28	6,317
November 6	3:30 pm	No. 22 James Madison	No. 20	Robins Stadium; Richmond, CA (rivalry)	CSN	W 13–10 ^{OT}	8,700
November 13	2:00 pm	Rhode Island	No. 21	Robins Stadium; Richmond, VA		W 15–6	8,136
November 20	3:30 pm	at No. 6 William & Mary	No. 18	Zable Stadium; Williamsburg, VA (Capital Cup)	CSN	L 3–41	12,259
*Non-conference game; ^{†}Homecoming; Rankings from The Sports Network Poll released prior to the game; All times are in Eastern time
