= 2010 William & Mary Tribe football team =

American college football season

2010 William & Mary Tribe football

CAA co-champion

NCAA Division I Second Round, L 15–31 vs. Georgia Southern
- Conference: Colonial Athletic Association

Ranking
- Sports Network: No. 10
- FCS Coaches: No. 8
- Record: 8–4 (6–2 CAA)
- Head coach: Jimmye Laycock (31st season)
- Offensive coordinator: Zbig Kepa (18th season)
- Offensive scheme: Pro-style
- Defensive coordinator: Bob Shoop (4th season)
- Base defense: 4–3
- Captains: Ben Cottingham; Evan Francks; Keith Hill Jr.; Courtland Marriner; Jake Trantin
- Home stadium: Zable Stadium

2010 Colonial Athletic Association football standings
	Conf.			Overall
Team	W		L	W		L
No. 2 Delaware +^	6	–	2	12	–	3
No. 10 William & Mary +^	6	–	2	8	–	4
No. 3 Villanova ^	5	–	3	9	–	5
No. 7 New Hampshire ^	5	–	3	8	–	5
UMass	4	–	4	6	–	5
Richmond	4	–	4	6	–	5
Rhode Island	4	–	4	5	–	6
James Madison	3	–	5	6	–	5
Maine	3	–	5	4	–	7
Towson	0	–	8	1	–	10
+ – Conference co-champions; ^ – FCS playoff participant; Rankings from The Sports Network poll

The 2010 William & Mary Tribe football team represented The College of William & Mary in the 2010 NCAA Division I FCS football season. William & Mary competed as a member of the Colonial Athletic Association (CAA) under head football coach Jimmye Laycock and played their home games at Zable Stadium. The Tribe clinched a share of the CAA championship in the final week of the regular season. Entering Week 11, they had to defeat #18 Richmond and have #15 Villanova upset #1 Delaware, and both of those results happened. The Tribe reclaimed the Capital Cup by defeating the Spiders, 41–3, and Villanova surprised Delaware, 28–21, in overtime. William & Mary and Delaware shared the title.

William & Mary's win over Richmond in the annual Capital Cup was also their first in the series since 2004. Richmond had won five straight contests—the longest such streak for the Spiders since a five-game stretch between 1919 and 1922—and it also capped the second consecutive regular season in which the Tribe went undefeated at home. Their last home loss (including playoffs) was November 22, 2008, against Richmond.

After receiving a first round bye in the playoffs, the number two-seed Tribe fell in their first playoff game, 31–15, to Georgia Southern. The game was played at home in front of a crowd of 8,243.

== Schedule ==
Date	Time	Opponent	Rank	Site	TV	Result	Attendance	Source
September 4	3:30 pm	at UMass	No. 4	Warren McGuirk Alumni Stadium; Hadley, MA	CSNNE	L 23–27	10,072	
September 11	7:00 pm	VMI*	No. 11	Zable Stadium; Williamsburg, VA (rivalry)		W 45–0	11,475	
September 18	7:00 pm	at Old Dominion*	No. 12	S. B. Ballard Stadium; Norfolk, VA (rivalry)	CSNMA	W 21–17	19,782	
September 25	6:00 pm	at Maine	No. 8	Alfond Stadium; Orono, ME		W 24–21	5,990	
October 2	3:30 pm	No. 1 Villanova	No. 7	Zable Stadium; Williamsburg, VA	CSNMA	W 31–24	12,259	
October 9	7:00 pm	Rhode Island	No. 4	Zable Stadium; Williamsburg, VA		W 26–7	8,196	
October 23	12:00 pm	No. 2 Delaware^{†}	No. 4	Zable Stadium; Williamsburg, VA (rivalry)	CSNNE	W 17–16	12,259	
October 30	3:30 pm	at North Carolina*	No. 3	Kenan Memorial Stadium; Chapel Hill, NC	ESPN3	L 17–21	51,000	
November 6	12:00 pm	at No. 8 New Hampshire	No. 4	Cowell Stadium; Durham, NH		W 13–3	6,008	
November 13	1:30 pm	at James Madison	No. 1	Bridgeforth Stadium; Harrisonburg, VA (rivalry)		L 24–30	16,733	
November 20	3:30 pm	No. 18 Richmond	No. 6	Zable Stadium; Williamsburg, VA (Capital Cup)	CSNNE	W 41–3	12,259	
December 4	1:30 pm	No. 20 Georgia Southern*	No. 4	Zable Stadium; Williamsburg, VA (NCAA Division I Second Round)		L 15–31	8,243	
*Non-conference game; ^{†}Homecoming; Rankings from The Sports Network Poll released prior to the game; All times are in Eastern time
