= 2010 New Hampshire Wildcats football team =

American college football season

2010 New Hampshire Wildcats football

FCS Playoffs Quarterfinals, L 3–16 vs. Delaware
- Conference: Colonial Athletic Association

Ranking
- Sports Network: No. 7
- FCS Coaches: No. 7
- Record: 8–5 (5–3 CAA)
- Head coach: Sean McDonnell (12th season)
- Offensive coordinator: Tim Cramsey (2nd season)
- Home stadium: Cowell Stadium

2010 Colonial Athletic Association football standings
	Conf.			Overall
Team	W		L	W		L
No. 2 Delaware +^	6	–	2	12	–	3
No. 10 William & Mary +^	6	–	2	8	–	4
No. 3 Villanova ^	5	–	3	9	–	5
No. 7 New Hampshire ^	5	–	3	8	–	5
UMass	4	–	4	6	–	5
Richmond	4	–	4	6	–	5
Rhode Island	4	–	4	5	–	6
James Madison	3	–	5	6	–	5
Maine	3	–	5	4	–	7
Towson	0	–	8	1	–	10
+ – Conference co-champions; ^ – FCS playoff participant; Rankings from The Sports Network poll

The 2010 New Hampshire Wildcats football team represented the University of New Hampshire in the 2010 NCAA Division I FCS football season. The Wildcats were led by 12th-year head coach Sean McDonnell and played their home games at Cowell Stadium in Durham, New Hampshire. They were a member of the Colonial Athletic Association. They finished the season 8–5, 5–3 in CAA play. They received an at-large bid into the FCS playoffs where they lost in the quarterfinals to Delaware.

== Schedule ==
Date	Time	Opponent	Rank	Site	TV	Result	Attendance	Source
September 4	12:00 pm	Central Connecticut State*	No. 10	Cowell Stadium; Durham, NH	UNHTV	W 33–3	7,419	
September 11	1:00 pm	at Pittsburgh*	No. 6	Heinz Field; Pittsburgh, PA	ESPN3	L 16–38	50,120	
September 18	12:00 pm	at Rhode Island	No. 8	Meade Stadium; Kingston, RI	CSN	L 25–28	4,521	
September 25	12:00 pm	Lehigh*	No. 16	Cowell Stadium; Durham, NH	UNHTV	W 31–10	8,144	
October 2	6:00 pm	at Maine	No. 14	Alfond Stadium; Orono, ME (Battle for the Brice–Cowell Musket)		L 13–16 ^{OT}	6,531	
October 9	12:00 pm	No. 11 Richmond^{†}	No. 22	Cowell Stadium; Durham, NH	CSN	W 17–0	12,095	
October 16	3:30 pm	at No. 7 James Madison	No. 16	Bridgeforth Stadium; Harrisonburg, VA	CSN	W 28–14	16,985	
October 23	3:30 pm	vs. No. 12 UMass	No. 10	Gillette Stadium; Foxborough, MA (Colonial Clash)	CSN	W 39–13	32,848	
November 6	12:00 pm	No. 8 William & Mary	No. 4	Cowell Stadium; Durham, NH	UNHTV	L 3–13	6,008	
November 13	12:00 pm	at No. 9 Villanova	No. 17	Villanova Stadium; Villanova, PA	CSN	W 31–24	7,103	
November 20	12:00 pm	Towson	No. 14	Cowell Stadium; Durham, NH	UNHTV	W 38–19	5,003	
December 4	1:00 pm	at No. 13 Bethune–Cookman*	No. 11	Municipal Stadium; Daytona Beach, FL (NCAA Division I Second Round)		W 45–20	5,738	
December 10	8:00 pm	at No. 5 Delaware*	No. 11	Delaware Stadium; Newark, DE (NCAA Division I Quarterfinal)	ESPN2	L 3–16	8,770	
*Non-conference game; ^{†}Homecoming; Rankings from The Sports Network Poll released prior to the game; All times are in Eastern time
