= 2010 Villanova Wildcats football team =

American college football season

2010 Villanova Wildcats football

FCS Playoffs Semifinals vs Eastern Washington, L 31–41
- Conference: Colonial Athletic Association

Ranking
- Sports Network: No. 3
- FCS Coaches: No. 3
- Record: 9–5 (5–3 CAA)
- Head coach: Andy Talley (26th season)
- Offensive coordinator: Sam Venuto (12th season)
- Offensive scheme: Multiple spread
- Defensive coordinator: Mark Reardon (6th season)
- Base defense: 4–2–5
- Home stadium: Villanova Stadium

2010 Colonial Athletic Association football standings
	Conf.			Overall
Team	W		L	W		L
No. 2 Delaware +^	6	–	2	12	–	3
No. 10 William & Mary +^	6	–	2	8	–	4
No. 3 Villanova ^	5	–	3	9	–	5
No. 7 New Hampshire ^	5	–	3	8	–	5
UMass	4	–	4	6	–	5
Richmond	4	–	4	6	–	5
Rhode Island	4	–	4	5	–	6
James Madison	3	–	5	6	–	5
Maine	3	–	5	4	–	7
Towson	0	–	8	1	–	10
+ – Conference co-champions; ^ – FCS playoff participant; Rankings from The Sports Network poll

The 2010 Villanova Wildcats football team represented Villanova University in the 2010 NCAA Division I FCS football season. The Wildcats were led by 26th year head coach Andy Talley and played their home games at Villanova Stadium in Villanova, Pennsylvania. They were a member of the Colonial Athletic Association. They finished the season 9–5, 5–3 in CAA play.

== Schedule ==
Date	Time	Opponent	Rank	Site	TV	Result	Attendance
September 3	5:00 pm	at Temple*	No. 1	Lincoln Financial Field; Philadelphia, PA (Mayor's Cup)	ESPN3	L 24–31	32,193
September 11	12:30 pm	at Lehigh*	No. 2	Goodman Stadium; Bethlehem, PA		W 35–0	8,168
September 18	3:30 pm	Towson	No. 1	Villanova Stadium; Villanova, PA	TCN	W 43–7	12,111
September 25	7:00 pm	No. 24 Penn*	No. 1	Villanova Stadium; Villanova, PA	TCN	W 22–10	8,117
October 2	3:30 pm	at No. 7 William & Mary	No. 1	Zable Stadium; Williamsburg, VA	CSN	L 24–31	12,259
October 16	12:00 pm	at Maine	No. 6	Alfond Stadium; Orono, ME	CSN	W 48–18	5,890
October 23	3:30 pm	No. 11 James Madison^{†}	No. 6	Villanova Stadium; Villanova, PA	NNAA	W 14–7	9,217
October 30	12:00 pm	No. 14 Richmond	No. 5	Villanova Stadium; Villanova, PA	TCN	W 28–7	6,317
November 6	1:00 pm	at Rhode Island	No. 3	Meade Stadium; Kingston, RI		L 14–17	4,329
November 13	12:00 pm	No. 17 New Hampshire	No. 9	Villanova Stadium; Villanova, PA	TCN	L 24–31	7,103
November 20	12:00 pm	at No. 1 Delaware	No. 15	Delaware Stadium; Newark, DE (Battle of the Blue)	TCN	W 28–21 ^{OT}	22,891
December 4	3:30 pm	at No. 3 Stephen F. Austin	No. 10	Homer Bryce Stadium; Nacogdoches, TX (FCS Playoffs Second Round)	ESPN3	W 54–24	4,938
December 11	12:00 pm	at No. 2 Appalachian State	No. 10	Kidd Brewer Stadium; Boone, NC (FCS Playoffs Quarterfinal)	ESPN	W 42–24	15,706
December 17	8:00 pm	at No. 1 Eastern Washington	No. 10	Roos Field; Cheney, WA (FCS Playoffs Semifinal)	ESPN2	L 31–41	6,600
*Non-conference game; ^{†}Homecoming; Rankings from The Sports Network Poll released prior to the game; All times are in Eastern time
