= E. Claiborne Robins Stadium =

University of Richmond sports stadium

Coordinates: 37.580892°N 77.536805°W

Robins Stadium

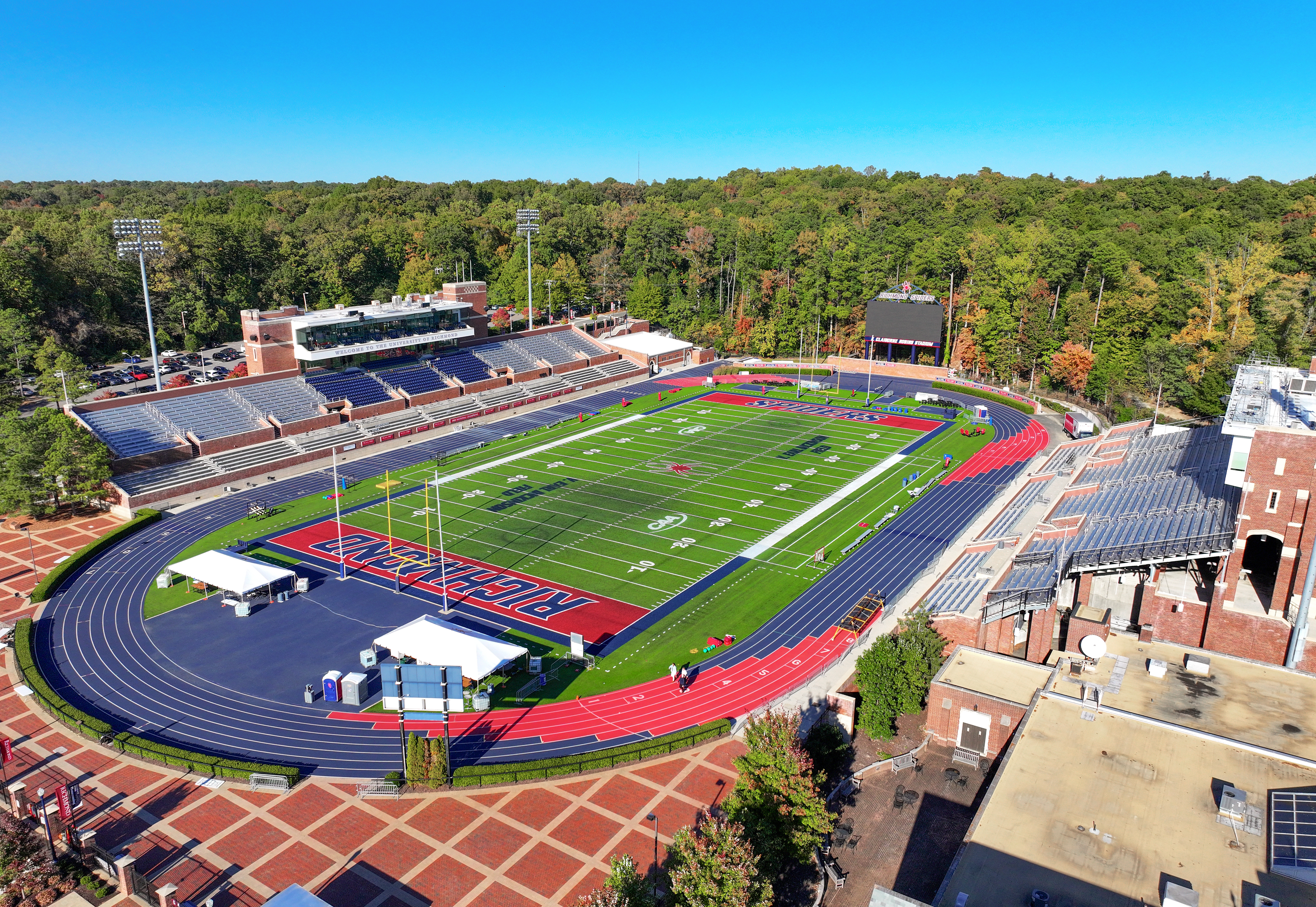
- Aerial view of the stadium in 2023
- Interactive map of Robins Stadium
- Full name: E. Claiborne Robins Stadium
- Former names: First Market Stadium; Soccer/Track Complex
- Address: 238 Boatwright Drive; Richmond, Virginia; United States
- Owner: University of Richmond
- Operator: Richmond Athletics
- Capacity: 8,217 (2017–present); 8,700 (2010–2016)
- Type: Stadium
- Surface: FieldTurf
- Current use: Football; Lacrosse; Track and field

Construction
- Groundbreaking: October 25, 2008
- Opened: September 18, 2010; 16 years ago
- Cost: $28 million
- Architects: BCWH Architects; McMillan, Pazdan, Smith
- Structural engineers: Dunbar Milby Williams Pittman & Vaughan
- Services engineer: Thompson Consulting Engineers
- General contractor: Hourigan Construction

Tenants
- Richmond Spiders (NCAA) teams: football, lacrosse, track & field

Website
- richmondspiders.com/robins-stadium

E. Claiborne Robins Stadium is an 8,217-seat stadium at the University of Richmond in Richmond, Virginia. It is home to the Richmond Spiders football, men's and women's lacrosse, and women's track and field teams.

The men's soccer team played there until 2012, when the university discontinued the program.

== History ==
Known for many years as the Soccer/Track Complex, the original 2,000-seat facility was renamed First Market Stadium in 2001 following a sponsorship from First Market Bank (now Atlantic Union Bank).

In 2002, the stadium's track was completely rebuilt. In 2003, it was named the Fred Hardy Track in honor of the longtime Spiders coach. The playing surface was changed from natural grass to FieldTurf, an artificial turf, in 2004.

Due to the age and off-campus location of City Stadium, where the Richmond Spiders football team played its home games, demand grew for an on-campus football facility.

The university and donors committed more than $25 million to a renovation of First Market Stadium, including a $5 million grant from the Robins Foundation in early 2008.

Renovations on the stadium began on December 20, 2008, coincidentally the day after the Spiders football team won the 2008 NCAA Division I Football Championship – the school's first national title in any sport.

On September 16, 2009, the stadium was renamed E. Claiborne Robins Stadium to honor the legacy of E. Claiborne Robins Sr and his historic philanthropy to the school.

The football team began play at Robins Stadium in the 2010 season, they won their first game 27-21 in overtime over Elon University.

== Attendance records ==
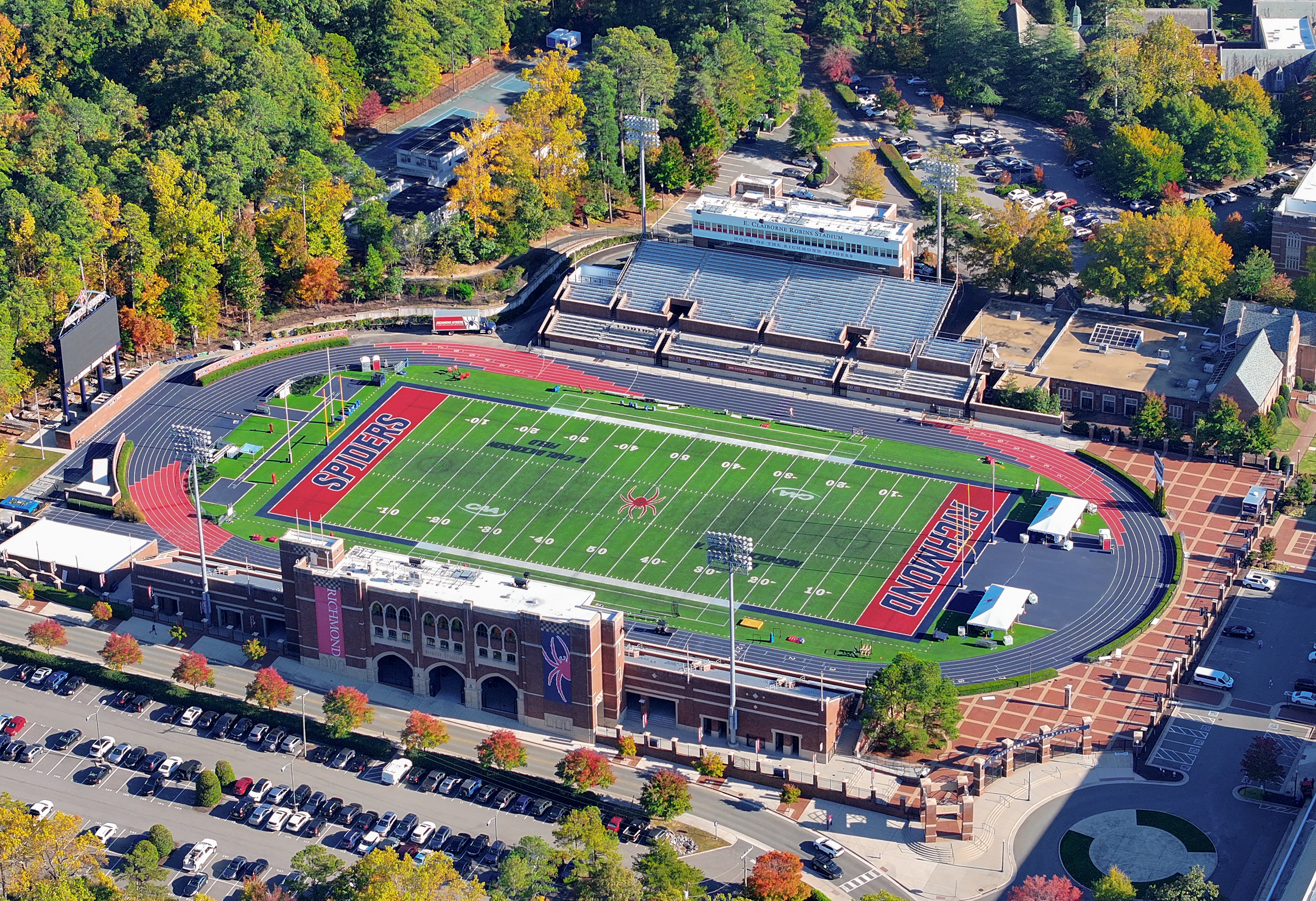
Aerial view in 2023

Rank	Attendance	Date	Game Result
1^{T}	8,700	November 12, 2016	8 Richmond 31, Delaware 17
1^{T}	8,700	October 15, 2016	6 Richmond 23, 13 Villanova 0
1^{T}	8,700	October 1, 2016	6 Richmond 31, Towson 28
1^{T}	8,700	September 24, 2016	7 Richmond 38, 23 Colgate 31
1^{T}	8,700	September 10, 2016	2 Richmond 34, Norfolk State 0
1^{T}	8,700	November 21, 2015	14 Richmond 20, 7 William & Mary 9
1^{T}	8,700	September 19, 2015	22 Richmond 42, VMI 10
1^{T}	8,700	November 15, 2014	14 Richmond 20, 25 James Madison 55
1^{T}	8,700	November 23, 2013	Richmond 31, 19 William & Mary 20
1^{T}	8,700	November 2, 2013	Richmond 27, Albany 10
1^{T}	8,700	October 26, 2013	Richmond 32, 8 Towson 48
1^{T}	8,700	September 28, 2013	22 Richmond 21, Maine 28
1^{T}	8,700	August 31, 2013	15 Richmond 34, VMI 0
1^{T}	8,700	November 10, 2012	20 Richmond 23, Delaware 17
1^{T}	8,700	November 3, 2012	22 Richmond 39, Rhode Island 0
1^{T}	8,700	October 20, 2012	Richmond 35, 2 James Madison 29
1^{T}	8,700	September 29, 2012	Richmond 37, 4 Old Dominion 45
1^{T}	8,700	September 8, 2012	Richmond 41, Gardner–Webb 8
1^{T}	8,700	November 19, 2011	Richmond 23, William & Mary 25
1^{T}	8,700	October 22, 2011	18 Richmond 22, 9 Maine 23
1^{T}	8,700	September 24, 2011	5 Richmond 43, 11 New Hampshire 45
1^{T}	8,700	September 17, 2011	6 Richmond 34, VMI 19
1^{T}	8,700	September 10, 2011	9 Richmond 21, Wagner 6
1^{T}	8,700	November 6, 2010	20 Richmond 13, 22 James Madison 10^{OT}
1^{T}	8,700	October 23, 2010	16 Richmond 28, Towson 6
1^{T}	8,700	September 25, 2010	5 Richmond 13, 7 Delaware 34
1^{T}	8,700	September 18, 2010	9 Richmond 27, 7 Elon 21^{OT}

== See also ==
- List of NCAA Division I FCS football stadiums
