= 2010 NCAA Division I FCS football rankings =

NCAA Division 1 coaches poll

The 2010 NCAA Division I FCS football rankings are from the Sports Network media poll and the coaches poll. This is for the 2010 season.

== Legend ==
	Increase in ranking
	Decrease in ranking
	Not ranked previous week
(#–#)	Win–loss record
(Italics)	Number of first place votes
т	Tied with team above or below also with this symbol

== The Sports Network poll ==
	Preseason	Week 1 Sept 7	Week 2 Sept 14	Week 3 Sept 21	Week 4 Sept 28	Week 5 Oct 5	Week 6 Oct 12	Week 7 Oct 19	Week 8 Oct 26	Week 9 Nov 2	Week 10 Nov 9	Week 11 Nov 16	Week 12 Nov 23	Week 13 Postseason	
1.	Villanova (104)	Montana (1–0) (57)	Villanova (1–1) (74)	Villanova (2–1) (87)	Villanova (3–1) (94)	Appalachian State (4–0) (101)	Appalachian State (5–0) (106)	Appalachian State (6–0) (111)	Appalachian State (7–0) (136)	Appalachian State (8–0) (134)	William & Mary (7–2) (105)	Delaware (9–1) (116)	Eastern Washington (9–2) (64)	Eastern Washington (13–2) (121)	1.
2.	Montana (9)	Villanova (0–1) (46)	Appalachian State (2–0) (25)	Appalachian State (3–0) (22)	Appalachian State (4–0) (24)	Delaware (5–0) (29)	Delaware (6–0) (29)	Delaware (7–0) (28)	Jacksonville State (8–0) (17)	Jacksonville State (8–0) (16)	Delaware (8–1) (31)	Appalachian State (9–1) (28)	Appalachian State (9–2) (39)	Delaware (12–3) (1)	2.
3.	Appalachian State (8)	Appalachian State (1–0) (8)	James Madison (2–0) (30)	James Madison (2–0) (25)	James Madison (3–0) (22)	Jacksonville State (5–0) (12)	Jacksonville State (6–0) (10)	Jacksonville State (7–0) (11)	William & Mary (6–1) (2)	Villanova (6–2) (1)	Appalachian State (8–1) (10)	Eastern Washington (8–2) (8)	Stephen F. Austin (9–2) (5)	Villanova (9–5)	3.
4.	William & Mary (3)	Southern Illinois (1–0) (3)	Jacksonville State (2–0) (9)	Jacksonville State (3–0) (5)	Jacksonville State (4–0) (5)	William & Mary (4–1)	William & Mary (5–1)	William & Mary (5–1)	Stephen F. Austin (6–1) (1)	William & Mary (6–2) (3)	Wofford (8–1) (5)	Jacksonville State (9–1) (2)	William & Mary (8–3) (3)	Appalachian State (10–3)	4.
5.	Southern Illinois (1)	Jacksonville State (1–0) (9)	Southern Illinois (1–1)	Richmond (1–1)	Delaware (4–0) (1)	Stephen F. Austin (3–1) (1)	Stephen F. Austin (4–1) (1)	Stephen F. Austin (5–1) (1)	Villanova (5–2)	Delaware (7–1)	Eastern Washington (7–2) (4)	Stephen F. Austin (8–2)	Delaware (9–2) (4)	Georgia Southern (10–5)	5.
6.	Richmond (1)	New Hampshire (1–0) (2)	Montana (1–1)	Stephen F. Austin (2–1)	Stephen F. Austin (3–1)	Villanova (3–2)	Villanova (3–2)	Villanova (4–2)	Delaware (7–1)	Eastern Washington (7–2)	Jacksonville State (8–1)	William & Mary (7–3)	Montana State (9–2) (7)	Wofford (10–3)	6.
7.	Elon	Richmond (0–1)	Elon (1–1)	Delaware (3–0)	William & Mary (3–1)	James Madison (3–1)	James Madison (4–1)	Montana (5–2)	Montana (6–2)	Wofford (7–1) (1)	Southeast Missouri State (9–1)	Bethune–Cookman (10–0) (4)	Wofford (9–2) (1)	New Hampshire (8–5)	7.
8.	Stephen F. Austin	Elon (0–1)	New Hampshire (1–1)	William & Mary (2–1)	UMass (3–1)	UMass (4–1)	UMass (4–1)	Eastern Washington (5–2)	Eastern Washington (6–2)	New Hampshire (5–3)	Stephen F. Austin (7–2)	Montana State (8–2) (1)	Jacksonville State (9–2) (4)	Stephen F. Austin (9–3)	8.
9.	South Dakota State	South Dakota State (0–0)	Richmond (0–1)	Eastern Washington (2–1)	South Carolina State (2–1)	South Carolina State (3–1)	Montana State (5–1)	Wofford (5–1)	Wofford (6–1)	Southeast Missouri State (8–1)	Villanova (6–3) (1)	Wofford (8–2)	Southeast Missouri State (9–2)	North Dakota State (9–5)	9.
10.	New Hampshire	Stephen F. Austin (0–1)	Stephen F. Austin (1–1)	Elon (1–2)	Montana State (3–1)	Montana State (4–1)	South Carolina State (4–1)	New Hampshire (4–3)	New Hampshire (5–3)	Stephen F. Austin (6–2)	Bethune–Cookman (9–0) (3)	Southeast Missouri State (9–2)	Villanova (7–4)	William & Mary (8–4)	10.
11.	South Carolina State	William & Mary (0–1) (1)	Delaware (2–0)	UMass (2–1)	Richmond (1–2)	Richmond (2–2)	Montana (4–2)	James Madison (4–2)	Southeast Missouri State (7–1)	Bethune–Cookman (8–0)	Montana State (8–2) (1)	Montana (7–3)	New Hampshire (7–4)	Montana State (9–3)	11.
12.	McNeese State	James Madison (1–0)	William & Mary (1–1)	South Carolina State (2–1)	Montana (2–2)	Montana (3–2)	Eastern Washington (4–2)	UMass (4–2)	Bethune–Cookman (7–0)	Montana State (7–2)	Liberty (7–2)	South Carolina State (8–2)	South Carolina State (9–2)	Jacksonville State (9–3)	12.
13.	Eastern Washington	McNeese State (1–0)	Northern Iowa (1–0)	Southern Illinois (1–2)	North Dakota State (3–1)	Eastern Washington (3–2)	Cal Poly (4–2)	Southeast Missouri State (6–1)	Montana State (6–2)	Montana (6–3)	Montana (6–3)	Northern Iowa (7–3)	Bethune–Cookman (10–1) (1)	Southeast Missouri State (9–3)	13.
14.	Northern Iowa	Northern Iowa (0–0)	South Carolina State (1–1)	Montana (1–2)	New Hampshire (2–2)	Cal Poly (3–2)	Wofford (4–1)	Bethune–Cookman (6–0)	Richmond (4–3)	Liberty (6–2)	UMass (6–3)	New Hampshire (6–4)	Penn (9–1)	Lehigh (10–3)	14.
15.	James Madison	South Carolina State (0–1)	Liberty (2–0)	Northern Iowa (1–1)	Cal Poly (3–1)	Northern Iowa (2–2)	North Dakota State (4–2)	Montana State (5–2)	James Madison (4–3)	UMass (5–3)	South Carolina State (7–2)	Villanova (6–4)	Montana (7–4)	Bethune–Cookman (10–2)	15.
16.	Delaware	Delaware (1–0)	UMass (2–0)	New Hampshire (1–2)	Eastern Washington (2–2)	Georgia Southern (3–1)	New Hampshire (3–3)	Richmond (3–3)	Liberty (5–2)	South Carolina State (6–2)	Northern Iowa (6–3)	Penn (8–1)	Northern Iowa (7–4)	South Carolina State (9–3)	16.
17.	Jacksonville State	Eastern Washington (0–1)	Cal Poly (2–0)	Montana State (2–1)	Northern Iowa (1–2)	Texas State (3–1)	Southern Illinois (3–3)	Liberty (5–2)	South Carolina State (5–2)	Northern Iowa (5–3)	New Hampshire (5–4)	North Dakota State (7–3)	Liberty (8–3)	Western Illinois (8–5)	17.
18.	Eastern Illinois	UMass (1–0) (Note: In the actual printed polls, UMass was listed as Massachusetts)	Eastern Washington (1–1)	North Dakota State (2–1)	Furman (2–1)	North Dakota State (3–2)	Southeast Missouri State (5–1)	South Carolina State (4–2)	UMass (4–3)	Penn (6–1)	Penn (7–1)	Richmond (6–4)	Jacksonville (10–1)	Penn (9–1)	18.
19.	Weber State	Liberty (1–0)	McNeese State (1–1)	McNeese State (1–1)	Georgia Southern (3–1)	Elon (2–3)	Liberty (4–2)	Northern Iowa (3–3)	Northern Iowa (4–3)	Cal Poly (6–3)	Cal Poly (7–3)	UMass (6–4)	Lehigh (9–2)	Northern Iowa (7–5)	19.
20.	Prairie View A&M	Weber State (0–1)	South Dakota State (0–1)	Cal Poly (2–1)	Texas State (3–1)	Western Illinois (4–1)	Richmond (2–3)	Penn (4–1)	Chattanooga (5–2)	Richmond (4–4)	Grambling State (8–1)	Jacksonville (10–1)	Georgia Southern (7–4)	Montana (7–4)	20.
21.	Liberty	North Dakota State (1–0)	Weber State (1–1)	South Dakota (2–1)	Elon (1–3)	Wofford (3–1)	Georgia Southern (3–2)	Western Illinois (5–2)	Penn (5–1)	Grambling State (7–1)	Richmond (5–4)	Liberty (7–3)	Western Illinois (7–4)	Liberty (8–3)	21.
22.	Colgate	Prairie View A&M (1–0)	Montana State (1–1)	Liberty (2–1)	Youngstown State (3–1)	New Hampshire (2–3)	Northern Iowa (2–3)	Northern Arizona (4–2)	Cal Poly (5–3)	James Madison (4–4)	Jacksonville (9–1)	Lehigh (8–2)	Cal Poly (7–4)	Jacksonville (10–1)	22.
23.	Penn	Eastern Illinois (0–1)	North Dakota State (1–1)	Furman (1–1)	Illinois State (3–1)	Southern Illinois (2–3)	Bethune–Cookman (5–0)	Cal Poly (4–3)	Grambling State (6–1)	Jacksonville (8–1)	Western Illinois (6–3)	Cal Poly (7–4)	Dayton (10–1)	Grambling State (9–2)	23.
24.	Montana State	Montana State (1–0)	Furman (1–0)	Penn (1–0)	Southern Illinois (1–3)	Liberty (3–2)	Elon (2–4)	Chattanooga (4–2)	Jacksonville (7–1)	Western Illinois (6–3)	North Dakota State (6–3)	Dayton (10–1)	Grambling State (8–2)	Cal Poly (7–4)	24.
25.	Holy Cross	Colgate (1–0)	South Dakota (1–1)	Central Arkansas (3–0)	Liberty (2–2)	Southeast Missouri State (4–1)	Penn (3–1)	Furman (4–2)	Northern Arizona (4–3)	North Dakota State (5–3)	Robert Morris (8–1)	Grambling State (8–2)	North Dakota State (7–4)	Dayton (10–1)	25.
	Preseason	Week 1 Sept 7	Week 2 Sept 14	Week 3 Sept 21	Week 4 Sept 28	Week 5 Oct 5	Week 6 Oct 12	Week 7 Oct 19	Week 8 Oct 26	Week 9 Nov 2	Week 10 Nov 9	Week 11 Nov 16	Week 12 Nov 23	Week 13 Postseason	
		Dropped: 23 Penn; 25 Holy Cross	Dropped: 22 Prairie View A&M; 23 Eastern Illinois; 25 Colgate	Dropped: 20 South Dakota State; 21 Weber State	Dropped: 19 McNeese State; 21 South Dakota; 24 Penn; 25 Central Arkansas	Dropped: 18 Furman; 22 Youngstown State; 23 Illinois State	Dropped: 17 Texas State; 20 Western Illinois	Dropped: 15 North Dakota State; 17 Southern Illinois; 21 Georgia Southern; 24 Elon	Dropped: 21 Western Illinois; 25 Furman	Dropped: 20 Chattanooga; 25 Northern Arizona	Dropped: 22 James Madison	Dropped: 23 Western Illinois; 25 Robert Morris	Dropped: 18 Richmond; 19 UMass	None	

== The Coaches poll ==
	Preseason	Week 1 Sept 7	Week 2 Sept 14	Week 3 Sept 21	Week 4 Sept 28	Week 5 Oct 5	Week 6 Oct 12	Week 7 Oct 19	Week 8 Oct 26	Week 9 Nov 2	Week 10 Nov 9	Week 11 Nov 16	Week 12 Nov 23	Week 13 Postseason	
1.	Villanova (22)	Montana (1–0) (16)	Appalachian State (2–0) (11)	Appalachian State (3–0) (17)	Appalachian State (4–0) (16)	Appalachian State (4–0) (24)	Appalachian State (5–0) (25)	Appalachian State (6–0) (25)	Appalachian State (7–0) (26)	Appalachian State (8–0)	Delaware (8–1) (19)	Delaware (9–1) (26)	Eastern Washington (9–2) (13)	Eastern Washington (13–2)	1.
2.	Montana (2)	Southern Illinois (1–0)	Villanova (1–1) (8)	Villanova (2–1) (6)	Villanova (3–1) (6)	Delaware (5–0) (2)	Delaware (6–0)	Delaware (7–0) (1)	Jacksonville State (8–0)	Jacksonville State (8–0)	William & Mary (7–2) (7)	Appalachian State (9–1)	Stephen F. Austin (9–2) (1)	Delaware (12–3)	2.
3.	Appalachian State (4)	Appalachian State (1–0) (1)	James Madison (2–0) (5)	James Madison (2–0) (3)	James Madison (3–0) (3)	Jacksonville State (5–0) (1)	Jacksonville State (6–0) (1)	Jacksonville State (7–0) (1)	Stephen F. Austin (6–1) (1)	Villanova (6–2)	Appalachian State (8–1)	Eastern Washington (8–2) (1)	Appalachian State (9–2) (12)	Villanova (9–5)	3.
4.	William & Mary	Villanova (0–1) (8)	Jacksonville State (2–0) (2)	Jacksonville State (3–0) (1)	Jacksonville State (4–0) (1)	Stephen F. Austin (3–1)	Stephen F. Austin (4–1) (1)	Stephen F. Austin (5–1)	William & Mary (6–1)	Delaware (7–1)	Wofford (8–1) (2)	Jacksonville State (9–1)	William & Mary (8–3)	Appalachian State (10–3)	4.
5.	Southern Illinois	New Hampshire (1–0)	Southern Illinois (1–1) (1)	Richmond (1–1)	Delaware (4–0) (1)	William & Mary (4–1)	William & Mary (5–1)	William & Mary (5–1)	Villanova (5–2)	William & Mary (6–2)	Eastern Washington (7–2)	Stephen F. Austin (8–2) (1)	Delaware (9–2)	Wofford (10–3)	5.
6.	Richmond	Jacksonville State (1–0) (2)	Montana (1–1)	Delaware (3–0)	Stephen F. Austin (3–1) (1)	James Madison (3–1)	James Madison (4–1)	Villanova (4–2)	Delaware (7–1)	Eastern Washington (7–2)	Jacksonville State (8–1)	William & Mary (7–3)	Wofford (9–2)	Georgia Southern (10–5)	6.
7.	Elon	Richmond (0–1)	Elon (1–1)	Stephen F. Austin (2–1) (1)	William & Mary (3–1)	Villanova (3–2)	Villanova (3–2)	Montana (5–2)	Montana (6–2)	Wofford (7–1)	Stephen F. Austin (7–2)	Wofford (8–2)	Montana State (9–2)	New Hampshire (8–5)	7.
8.	Stephen F. Austin	Elon (0–1)	New Hampshire (1–1)	William & Mary (2–1)	UMass (3–1)	UMass (4–1)	UMass (4–1)	Eastern Washington (5–2)	Eastern Washington (6–2)	New Hampshire (5–3)	Southeast Missouri State (9–1)	Montana State (8–2)	Southeast Missouri State (9–2)	William & Mary (8–4)	8.
9.	New Hampshire	South Dakota State (0–0)	Richmond (0–1)	UMass (2–1)	South Carolina State (2–1)	South Carolina State (3–1)	South Carolina State (4–1)	New Hampshire (4–3)	New Hampshire (5–3)	Stephen F. Austin (6–2)	Villanova (6–3)	Bethune–Cookman (10–0)	Jacksonville State (9–2) (1)	North Dakota State (9–5)	9.
10.	South Dakota State	McNeese State (1–0)	Northern Iowa (1–0)	Eastern Washington (2–1)	Montana State (3–1)	Montana State (4–1)	Montana State (5–1)	Wofford (5–1)	Wofford (6–1)	Southeast Missouri State (8–1)	Montana State (8–2)	Southeast Missouri State (9–2)	New Hampshire (7–4)	Stephen F. Austin (9–3)	10.
11.	McNeese State	James Madison (1–0)	Stephen F. Austin (1–1)	Elon (1–2)	Montana (2–2)	Richmond (2–2)	Montana (4–2)	James Madison (4–2)	Southeast Missouri State (7–1)	Montana State (7–2)	Liberty (7–2)	South Carolina State (8–2)	Villanova (7–4)	Montana State (9–3)	11.
12.	South Carolina State	Stephen F. Austin (0–1)	Delaware (2–0)	South Carolina State (2–1)	Richmond (1–2)	Montana (3–2)	Eastern Washington (4–2)	UMass (4–2)	Liberty (5–2)	Liberty (6–2)	Bethune–Cookman (9–0)	Northern Iowa (7–3)	South Carolina State (9–2)	Jacksonville State (9–3)	12.
13.	Northern Iowa	Northern Iowa (0–0)	William & Mary (1–1)	Southern Illinois (1–2)	North Dakota State (3–1)	Georgia Southern (3–1)	Cal Poly (4–2)	Southeast Missouri State (6–1)	Montana State (6–2)	Bethune–Cookman (8–0)	UMass (6–3)	New Hampshire (6–4)	Penn (9–1)	Southeast Missouri State (9–3)	13.
14.	Eastern Washington	William & Mary (0–1)	Liberty (2–0)	Montana (1–2)	Cal Poly (3–1)	Eastern Washington (3–2)	North Dakota State (4–2)	Liberty (5–2)	Richmond (4–3)	South Carolina State (6–2)	South Carolina State (7–2)	Montana (7–3)	Bethune–Cookman (10–1)	Lehigh (10–3)	14.
15.	James Madison	Eastern Washington (0–1)	UMass (2–0)	Northern Iowa (1–1)	New Hampshire (2–2)	Texas State (3–1)	New Hampshire (3–3)	Richmond (3–3)	James Madison (4–3)	UMass (5–3)	New Hampshire (5–4)	Villanova (6–4)	Liberty (8–3)	Bethune–Cookman (10–2)	15.
16.	Eastern Illinois	South Carolina State (0–1)	Eastern Washington (1–1)	Montana State (2–1)	Georgia Southern (3–1)	Cal Poly (3–2)	Southern Illinois (3–3)	Montana State (5–2)	Bethune–Cookman (7–0)	Montana (6–3)	Northern Iowa (6–3)	Penn (8–1)	Northern Iowa (7–4)	Penn (9–1)	16.
17.	Jacksonville State	Delaware (1–0)	South Carolina State (1–1)	McNeese State (1–1)	Eastern Washington (2–2)	North Dakota State (3–2)	Wofford (4–1)	South Carolina State (4–2)	South Carolina State (5–2)	Northern Iowa (5–3)	Montana (6–3)	North Dakota State (7–3)	Montana (7–4)	South Carolina State (9–3)	17.
18.	Weber State	Liberty (1–0)	Cal Poly (2–0)	New Hampshire (1–2)	Texas State (3–1)	Northern Iowa (2–2)	Georgia Southern (3–2)	Western Illinois (5–2)	UMass (4–3)	Cal Poly (6–3)	Cal Poly (7–3)	Liberty (7–3)	Lehigh (9–2)	Northern Iowa (7–5)	18.
19.	Delaware	Weber State (0–1)	McNeese State (1–1)	North Dakota State (2–1)	Illinois State (3–1)	Elon (2–3)	Richmond (2–3)	Bethune–Cookman (6–0)	Northern Iowa (4–3)	Penn (6–1)	Penn (7–1)	UMass (6–4)	Jacksonville (10–1)	Liberty (8–3)	19.
20.	Liberty	UMass (1–0)	Weber State (1–1)	South Dakota (2–1)	Youngstown State (3–1)	Western Illinois (4–1)	Southeast Missouri State (5–1)	Northern Arizona (4–2)	Cal Poly (5–3)	North Dakota State (5–3)	North Dakota State (6–3)	Richmond (6–4)	Cal Poly (7–4)	Western Illinois (8–5)	20.
21.	Prairie View A&M	North Dakota State (1–0)	South Dakota State (0–1)	Liberty (2–1)	Elon (1–3)	Southern Illinois (2–3)	Liberty (4–2)	Cal Poly (4–3)	Penn (5–1)	Western Illinois (6–3)	Western Illinois (6–3)	Jacksonville (10–1)	North Dakota State (7–4)	Montana (7–4)	21.
22.	Colgate	Eastern Illinois (0–1)	Montana State (1–1)	Cal Poly (2–1)	Northern Iowa (1–2)	Central Arkansas (3–1)	Texas State (3–2)	Northern Iowa (3–3)	North Dakota State (5–3)	Richmond (4–4)	Grambling State (8–1)	Lehigh (8–2)	Georgia Southern (7–4)	Jacksonville (10–1)	22.
23.	Northern Arizona	Montana State (1–0)	North Dakota State (1–1)	Texas State (2–1)	Furman (2–1)	New Hampshire (2–3)	Western Illinois (4–2)	Penn (4–1)	Chattanooga (5–2)	James Madison (4–4)	Richmond (5–4)	Cal Poly (7–4)	Grambling State (8–2)	Cal Poly (7–4)	23.
24.	Montana State	Northern Arizona (1–0)	South Dakota (1–1)	Georgia Southern (2–1)	Southern Illinois (1–3)	Northern Arizona (3–1)	Northern Iowa (2–3)	North Dakota State (4–3)	Western Illinois (5–3)	Grambling State (7–1)	Jacksonville (9–1)	Grambling State (8–2)	Western Illinois (7–4)	Grambling State (9–2)	24.
25.	Cal Poly т	Colgate (1–0)	Furman (1–0)	Illinois State (2–1)	Central Arkansas (3–1)	Wofford (3–1)	Penn (3–1)	Furman (4–2)	Grambling State (6–1)	Jacksonville (8–1)	Robert Morris (8–1)	Dayton (10–1)	Dayton (10–1)	Dayton (10–1)	25.
26.	Holy Cross т														26.
	Preseason	Week 1 Sept 7	Week 2 Sept 14	Week 3 Sept 21	Week 4 Sept 28	Week 5 Oct 5	Week 6 Oct 12	Week 7 Oct 19	Week 8 Oct 26	Week 9 Nov 2	Week 10 Nov 9	Week 11 Nov 16	Week 12 Nov 23	Week 13 Postseason	
		Dropped: 21 Prairie View A&M; 25 Cal Poly; 26 Holy Cross	Dropped: 22 Eastern Illinois; 24 Northern Arizona; 25 Colgate	Dropped: 20 Weber State; 21 South Dakota State; 25 Furman	Dropped: 17 McNeese State; 20 South Dakota; 21 Liberty	Dropped: 19 Illinois State; 20 Youngstown State; 23 Furman	Dropped: 19 Elon; 22 Central Arkansas; 24 Northern Arizona	Dropped: 16 Southern Illinois; 18 Georgia Southern; 22 Texas State	Dropped: 20 Northern Arizona; 25 Furman	Dropped: 23 Chattanooga	Dropped: 23 James Madison	Dropped: 21 Western Illinois; 25 Robert Morris	Dropped: 19 UMass; 20 Richmond	None	
