= Walt Hameline =

American football coach (born 1951)

Current position
- Title: Vice president for intercollegiate athletics
- Team: Wagner
- Conference: NEC

Biographical details
- Born: August 16, 1951 (age 75)

Playing career
- 1972–1975: Brockport
- Position: Linebacker

Coaching career (HC unless noted)
- 1977: Brown (assistant)
- 1978–1980: Wagner (OL)
- 1981–2014: Wagner

Administrative career (AD unless noted)
- 1982–2022: Wagner
- 2022–present: Wagner (VP)

Head coaching record
- Overall: 224–139–2
- Bowls: 5–2
- Tournaments: 4–2 (NCAA D-III playoffs); 1–1 (NCAA D-I playoffs)

Accomplishments and honors

Championships
- 1 NCAA Division III (1987); 1 LFC (1992); 2 NEC (2012, 2014)

Awards
- AFCA NCAA Division III Coach of the Year (1987); NEC Coach of the Year (2012)

Walt Hameline (born August 16, 1951) is an American college athletics administrator and former college football coach. He is the athletic director at Wagner College in Staten Island, New York. Hameline was the head football coach from at Wagner from 1981 to 2014, compiling a record of 224–139–2 and guiding them to the NCAA Division III Football Championship in 1987. Wagner College is currently an NCAA Division I Football Championship Subdivision (FCS) program that is a member of the Northeast Conference.

Wagner football teams under Hameline's guidance finished with winning records 23 times in his career. In November 2010, he reached the 200-win mark as Wagner defeated Monmouth, 31–20.

Hameline lives with his wife in Colts Neck Township, New Jersey.

== Head coaching record ==
Year	Team	Overall	Conference	Standing	Bowl/playoffs
Wagner Seahawks (NCAA Division III independent) (1981–1991)
1981	Wagner	9–1			
1982	Wagner	8–1–1			L NCAA Division III Quarterfinal
1983	Wagner	8–2–1			W ECAC Metro NY-NJ
1984	Wagner	6–4			
1985	Wagner	9–2			W ECAC South
1986	Wagner	9–2			W ECAC South
1987	Wagner	13–1			W NCAA Division III Championship
1988	Wagner	8–2			L NCAA Division III First Round
1989	Wagner	6–3			
1990	Wagner	5–5			
1991	Wagner	5–5			
Wagner Seahawks (Liberty Football Conference) (1992)
1992	Wagner	9–2	5–0	1st	W ECAC Southeast Bowl
Wagner Seahawks (NCAA Division I-AA independent) (1993–1995)
1993	Wagner	9–2			W ECAC-IFC Division I-AA Bowl
1994	Wagner	6–5			L ECAC-IFC Division I-AA Bowl
1995	Wagner	8–2			L ECAC-IFC Division I-AA Bowl
Wagner Seahawks (Northeast Conference) (1996–2014)
1996	Wagner	5–5	2–2	T–3rd	
1997	Wagner	6–4	2–2	3rd	
1998	Wagner	7–3	3–2	T–3rd	
1999	Wagner	5–5	5–2	3rd	
2000	Wagner	6–5	6–2	3rd	
2001	Wagner	3–6	3–5	T–5th	
2002	Wagner	7–4	4–3	4th	
2003	Wagner	6–5	3–4	T–5th	
2004	Wagner	6–5	3–4	T–4th	
2005	Wagner	6–5	3–4	T–5th	
2006	Wagner	4–7	0–7	8th	
2007	Wagner	7–4	3–3	T–3rd	
2008	Wagner	3–8	1–6	7th	
2009	Wagner	6–5	5–3	T–3rd	
2010	Wagner	5–6	3–5	T–6th	
2011	Wagner	4–7	4–4	T–4th	
2012	Wagner	9–4	7–1	T–1st	L NCAA Division I Second Round
2013	Wagner	3–8	2–4	T–6th	
2014	Wagner	7–4	5–1	T–1st	
Wagner:		224–139–2	69–62		
Total:		224–139–2			
National championship Conference title Conference division title or championship game berth

== See also ==
- List of college football career coaching wins leaders
- List of college football career coaching losses leaders
