= 2010 Penn Quakers football team =

American college football season

2010 Penn Quakers football

Ivy League champion
- Conference: Ivy League

Ranking
- Sports Network: No. 18
- Record: 9–1 (7–0 Ivy)
- Head coach: Al Bagnoli (19th season)
- Offensive coordinator: Jon McLaughlin (2nd season)
- Defensive coordinator: Ray Priore (13th season)
- Home stadium: Franklin Field

2010 Ivy League football standings
	Conf.			Overall
Team	W		L	W		L
No. 18 Penn $	7	–	0	9	–	1
Harvard	5	–	2	7	–	3
Yale	5	–	2	7	–	3
Brown	5	–	2	6	–	4
Dartmouth	3	–	4	6	–	4
Columbia	2	–	5	4	–	6
Cornell	1	–	6	2	–	8
Princeton	0	–	7	1	–	9
$ – Conference champion; Rankings from The Sports Network poll

The 2010 Penn Quakers football team represented the University of Pennsylvania in the 2010 NCAA Division I FCS football season. The Quakers were led by 19th-year head coach Al Bagnoli and played their home games at Franklin Field in Philadelphia. They finished the season 9–1 overall and 7–0 in Ivy League play, winning the conference title.

== Schedule ==
Date	Opponent	Site	Result	Attendance	Source
September 18	Lafayette*	Franklin Field; Philadelphia, PA	W 19–14	11,299	
September 25	Villanova*	Villanova Stadium; Villanova, PA	L 10–22	8,117	
October 2	Dartmouth	Memorial Field; Hanover, NH	W 35–28	10,407	
October 9	at Bucknell*	Christy Mathewson–Memorial Stadium; Lewisburg, PA	W 31–10	2,213	
October 16	Columbia	Franklin Field; Philadelphia, PA	W 27–13	10,523	
October 23	at Yale	Yale Bowl; New Haven, CT	W 27–20	22,293	
October 30	Brown	Franklin Field; Philadelphia, PA	W 24–7	14,854	
November 6	Princeton	Powers Field at Princeton Stadium; Princeton, NJ (rivalry)	W 52–10	8,241	
November 13	Harvard	Franklin Field; Philadelphia, PA (rivalry)	W 34–14	12,546	
November 20	at Cornell	Schoellkopf Field; Ithaca, NY (rivalry)	W 31–7	3,333	
*Non-conference game
