= 2010 Wagner Seahawks football team =

American college football season

2010 Wagner Seahawks football
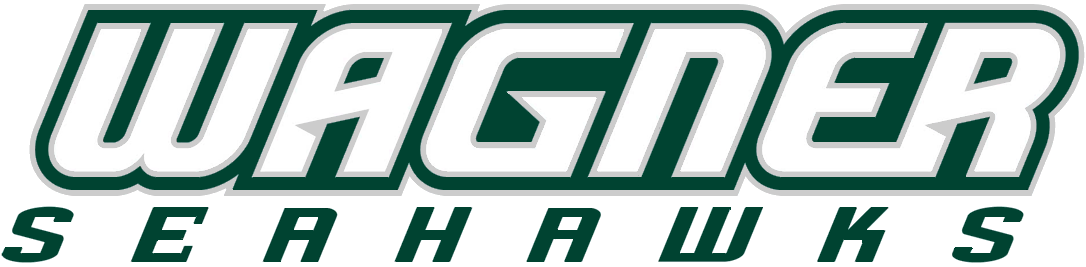
- Conference: Northeast Conference
- Record: 5–6 (3–5 NEC)
- Head coach: Walt Hameline (30th season)
- Home stadium: Wagner College Stadium

2010 Northeast Conference football standings
	Conf.			Overall
Team	W		L	W		L
Robert Morris +^	7	–	1	8	–	3
Central Connecticut State +	7	–	1	8	–	3
Duquesne	5	–	3	7	–	4
Bryant	4	–	4	7	–	4
Albany	4	–	4	6	–	5
Wagner	3	–	5	5	–	6
Monmouth	3	–	5	3	–	8
Sacred Heart	2	–	6	4	–	7
Saint Francis (PA)	1	–	7	1	–	10
+ – Conference co-champions; ^ – FCS playoff participant

The 2010 Wagner Seahawks football team represented Wagner College in the 2010 NCAA Division I FCS football season as a member of the Northeast Conference (NEC). The Seahawks were led by 30th-year head coach Walt Hameline and played their home games at Wagner College Stadium. Wagner finished the season 5–6 overall and 3–5 in NEC play to place fourth.

== Schedule ==
Date	Time	Opponent	Site	Result	Attendance
September 11	7:00 p.m.	at Assumption*	Multi-Sport Stadium; Worcester, MA	L 9–24	1,532
September 18	1:00 p.m.	Cornell*	Wagner College Stadium; Staten Island, NY	W 41–7	2,237
September 25	Noon	Robert Morris	Wagner College Stadium; Staten Island, NY	L 9–31	2,410
October 2	1:00 p.m.	Bryant	Wagner College Stadium; Staten Island, NY	W 29–21	1,717
October 9	1:00 p.m.	at Georgetown*	Multi-Sport Field; Washington, DC	W 22–16 ^{2OT}	1,582
October 16	2:00 p.m.	at Saint Francis	DeGol Field; Loretto, PA	W 22–14	1,411
October 23	1:00 p.m.	Duquesne	Wagner College Stadium; Staten Island, NY	L 20–21	2,832
October 30	Noon	at Central Connecticut State	Arute Field; New Britain, CT	L 20–38	2,684
November 6	1:00 p.m.	Monmouth	Wagner College Stadium; Staten Island, NY	W 31–20	1,138
November 13	1:00 p.m.	at Albany	University Field; Albany, NY	L 14–24	1,634
November 20	1:00 p.m.	at Sacred Heart	Campus Field; Fairfield, CT	L 22–38	1,567
*Non-conference game; All times are in Eastern time
