= 2010 VMI Keydets football team =

American college football season

2010 VMI Keydets football
- Conference: Big South Conference
- Record: 3–8 (2–4 Big South)
- Head coach: Sparky Woods (3rd season)
- Offensive coordinator: Matt Campbell (1st season)
- Offensive scheme: Pro-style
- Defensive coordinator: A. J. Christoff (3rd season)
- Base defense: 4–3
- Home stadium: Alumni Memorial Field

2010 Big South Conference football standings
	Conf.			Overall
Team	W		L	W		L
No. 21 Liberty +	5	–	1	8	–	3
Stony Brook +	5	–	1	6	–	5
Coastal Carolina +^	5	–	1	6	–	6
Gardner–Webb	2	–	4	4	–	7
VMI	2	–	4	3	–	8
Charleston Southern	1	–	5	3	–	8
Presbyterian	1	–	5	2	–	9
$ – Conference champion; ^ – FCS playoff participant; Rankings from The Sports Network poll

The 2010 VMI Keydets football team represented the Virginia Military Institute during the 2010 NCAA Division I FCS football season. It was VMI's 120th football season, which dates back to 1891. In his 3rd year at VMI, the Keydets were led by head coach Sparky Woods, who became the VMI's 30th all-time football coach in 2008. VMI plays its home games at Alumni Memorial Field, as they have since 1962.

After defeating Division-II Lock Haven 48–6, VMI was beat by William & Mary (45–0) and Virginia (48–6), and the following week defeated conference foe Presbyterian College 24–13 in the Big South Conference opener. They were defeated heavily by Stony Brook and Liberty in the next two weeks. The Keydets next defeated Charleston Southern 34–16, but ended the year on a 4-game losing streak, falling to Army, Coastal Carolina, Old Dominion, and Gardner-Webb. They finished the year 3–8 overall and 2–4 in the Big South. The program has not had a winning season since 1981.

== Schedule ==
Date	Time	Opponent	Site	TV	Result	Attendance
September 4	1:30 p.m.	Lock Haven*	Alumni Memorial Field; Lexington, VA	BSN	W 48–6	6,865
September 11	7:00 p.m.	at No. 11 William & Mary*	Zable Stadium; Williamsburg, VA (rivalry)		L 45–0	11,475
September 25	1:30 p.m.	at Virginia*	Scott Stadium; Charlottesville, VA	ESPN3	L 48–6	43,592
October 2	1:30 p.m.	Presbyterian^{†}	Alumni Memorial Field; Lexington, VA	BSN	W 24–13	5,719
October 9	3:30 p.m.	at Stony Brook	Kenneth P. LaValle Stadium; Stony Brook, NY	BSN	L 27–9	7,432
October 16	1:30 p.m.	Liberty	Alumni Memorial Field; Lexington, VA	MASN	L 41–7	7,157
October 23	11:30 a.m.	at Charleston Southern	Buccaneer Field; North Charleston, SC	SPS	W 34–16	3,476
October 30	12:00 p.m.	at Army*	Michie Stadium; West Point, NY	CBSCS	L 29–7	32,410
November 6	1:30 p.m.	Coastal Carolina	Alumni Memorial Field; Lexington, VA	ESPN3	L 31–3	5,123
November 13	3:3 p.m.	at Old Dominion	Foreman Field; Norfolk, VA	TCN	L 45–28	19,782
November 20	11:30 a.m.	Gardner–Webb	Ernest W. Spangler Stadium; Boiling Springs, NC	SPS	L 10–7	3,950
*Non-conference game; ^{†}Homecoming; Rankings from The Sports Network Poll released prior to the game; All times are in Eastern time

== Game summaries ==
=== Lock Haven ===
Quarter	1	2	3	4	Total
Lock Haven	0	6	0	0	6
VMI	6	14	21	7	48

at Alumni Memorial Field (Lexington, VA)

- Game time: 1:30 PM
- Game attendance: 6,865
- Referee: Tracy Jones

=== William and Mary ===
William and Mary built a 31–0 halftime lead capped off with a fake kneel down Hail Mary touchdown pass to close the half, much like in the USC-UCLA game in 1986. William and Mary put in the backups and did not attempt a single pass in the second half as they coasted to their 45–0 win.

Quarter	1	2	3	4	Total
VMI	0	0	0	0	0
William and Mary	10	21	7	7	45

at Zable Stadium (Williamsburg, VA)

- Game time: 7:00 PM
- Game attendance: 11,475
- Referee: Bill Broadhurst

=== Virginia ===
Quarter	1	2	3	4	Total
VMI	7	0	0	0	7
Virginia	14	17	10	7	48

at Scott Stadium (Charlottesville, VA)

- Game time: 1:30 PM
- Game attendance: 43,592
- Referee: W. Davenport

=== Presbyterian ===
Quarter	1	2	3	4	Total
Presbyterian	7	3	0	3	13
VMI	10	7	0	7	24

at Alumni Memorial Field (Lexington, VA)

- Game time: 1:30 PM
- Game attendance: 5,719
- Referee: Jeff Heaser

=== Stony Brook ===
Quarter	1	2	3	4	Total
VMI	3	0	0	6	9
Stony Brook	0	10	10	7	27

at Kenneth P. LaValle Stadium (Stony Brook, NY)

- Game time: 3:30 PM
- Game attendance: 7,432
- Referee: Todd LaPenta

=== Liberty ===
Quarter	1	2	3	4	Total
Liberty	14	17	7	3	41
VMI	0	0	0	7	7

at Alumni Memorial Field (Lexington, VA)

- Game time: 1:30 PM
- Game attendance: 7,157
- Referee: J. Magallanes

=== Charleston Southern ===
Quarter	1	2	3	4	Total
VMI	7	10	0	17	34
Charleston Southern	13	0	3	0	16

at Buccaneer Field (Charleston, SC)

- Game time: 11:30 AM
- Game attendance: 3,476
- Referee: Ron Cherry
- TV: SportSouth

=== Army ===
Quarter	1	2	3	4	Total
VMI	0	0	7	0	7
Army	7	12	0	10	29

at Michie Stadium (West Point, NY

- Game time: Noon
- Game attendance: 32,410
- Referee: Tom McCreesh
- TV: CBS College Sports

=== Coastal Carolina ===
Quarter	1	2	3	4	Total
Coastal Carolina	7	10	7	7	31
VMI	3	0	0	0	3

at Alumni Memorial Field (Lexington, VA)

- Game time: 1:30 PM
- Game attendance: 5,123
- Referee: Tom Zimorski
- TV: ESPN3

=== Old Dominion ===
Quarter	1	2	3	4	Total
VMI	14	0	7	7	28
Old Dominion	7	17	14	7	45

at S.B. Ballard Stadium (Norfolk, VA)

- Game time: 3:30 PM
- Game attendance: 19,782
- Referee: David Epperley
- TV: TCN

=== Gardner-Webb ===
Quarter	1	2	3	4	Total
VMI	0	0	7	0	7
Gardner-Webb	0	3	0	7	10

at Spangler Stadium (Boiling Springs, NC)

- Game time: 11:30 AM
- Game attendance: 3,950
- Referee: Tracy Jones
- TV: SportSouth

== Team leaders ==
=== Rushing ===
Name	GP	Attempts	Net Yards	Avg.	TD	Avg/Game
Chaz Jones	9	133	502	3.8	6	55.8
Gabe Itoka	11	105	401	3.8	0	36.5
Julian Bowers	5	29	63	2.2	2	12.6

=== Passing ===
Name	GP	Comp	Attempts	Int	TD	Yards	Avg/game
Cameron Jones	10	84	172	9	6	831	83.1
Eric Kordenbrock	9	67	134	7	3	723	80.3
Adam Morgan	9	35	76	4	3	370	41.1

=== Receiving ===
Name	GP	Thrown to	Yards	Avg.	TD	Avg/Game
T.J. Talley	11	35	407	11.6	3	37.0
Mario Scott	11	30	375	12.5	3	34.1
Chaz Jones	9	24	134	5.6	1	14.9

=== Punt returning ===
Name	Attempts	Yards	Avg.	TD	Long
Michael Rainey-Wiles	18	221	12.3	1	52
Mario Scott	7	46	6.6	0	13
Mike Smith	1	3	3.0	0	0

=== Interceptions ===
Name	Int	Yards	Avg.	TD
Greg Walker	2	58	29.0	1
Trae Watkins	2	6	3.0	0
A.J. Gross	1	0	0	0

=== Kick returning ===
Name	Attempts	Yards	Avg.	TD	Long
Mario Scott	28	554	19.8	0	45
Michael Rainey-Wiles	18	387	21.5	0	35
T.J. Talley	7	152	21.7	0	38
