= 2010 Fordham Rams football team =

American college football season

2010 Fordham Rams football
- Conference: Patriot League
- Record: 5–6 (3–3 Patriot)
- Head coach: Tom Masella (5th season)
- Offensive coordinator: Bryan Volk (2nd season)
- Defensive coordinator: Matt Dawson (1st season)
- Home stadium: Coffey Field

2010 Patriot League football standings
| | Conf. | | | Overall |
| Team | W | | L | W | | L |
|---|---|---|---|---|---|---|
| No. 14 Lehigh $^ | 5 | – | 0 | 10 | – | 3 |
| Colgate | 3 | – | 2 | 7 | – | 4 |
| Holy Cross | 3 | – | 2 | 6 | – | 5 |
| Georgetown | 2 | – | 3 | 4 | – | 7 |
| Lafayette | 1 | – | 4 | 2 | – | 9 |
| Bucknell | 1 | – | 4 | 1 | – | 10 |
| Fordham | 0 | – | 0 | 5 | – | 6 |
$ – Conference champion; ^ – FCS playoff participant; Rankings from The Sports Network poll

The 2010 Fordham Rams football team represented Fordham University in the 2010 NCAA Division I FCS football season. The Rams were led by fifth year head coach Tom Masella and played their home games at Coffey Field. They are a member of the Patriot League.

Fordham welcomed its first class of scholarship players since the school flirted with elevating to the Division I-AA level in the late 1970s. The Rams were made ineligible for the Patriot League championship because the league's bylaws prohibited the use of scholarship players.

They finished the season 5–6, with a 3–3 record against Patriot League opponents. Because their games did not count in the league standings, the Patriot League record book credits them with a 0–0 record and places them last in the standings table.

== Schedule ==
| Date | Time | Opponent | Site | Result | Attendance | Source |
|---|---|---|---|---|---|---|
| September 4 | 3:00 pm | at Bryant* | Bulldog Stadium; Smithfield, RI | L 30–44 | 5,113 | |
| September 11 | 6:04 pm | Rhode Island* | Coffey Field; Bronx, NY | W 27–25 | 2,952 | |
| September 18 | 12:30 pm | at Columbia* | Robert K. Kraft Field at Lawrence A. Wien Stadium; New York, NY (Liberty Cup) | W 16–9 | 4,454 | |
| September 25 | 1:04 pm | Assumption*^{†} | Coffey Field; Bronx, NY | L 24–30 | 5,135 | |
| October 2 | 1:00 pm | at Holy Cross | Fitton Field; Worcester, MA (Ram–Crusader Cup) | L 31–36 | 10,891 | |
| October 9 | 12:37 pm | at Lehigh | Goodman Stadium; Bethlehem, PA | L 17–21 | 5,176 | |
| October 16 | 12:01 pm | at Yale* | Yale Bowl; New Haven, CT | L 6–7 | 6,687 | |
| October 23 | 1:10 pm | Lafayette | Coffey Field; Bronx, NY | W 14–10 | 4,787 | |
| October 30 | 1:05 pm | Georgetown | Coffey Field; Bronx, NY | W 24–19 | 2,821 | |
| November 6 | 1:02 pm | at Bucknell | Christy Mathewson-Memorial Stadium; Lewisburg, PA | W 33–21 | 1,935 | |
| November 20 | 1:05 pm | Colgate | Coffey Field; Bronx, NY | L 12–47 | 3,166 | |
*Non-conference game; ^{†}Homecoming; All times are in Eastern time
