= 2010 Presbyterian Blue Hose football team =

American college football season

2010 Presbyterian Blue Hose football
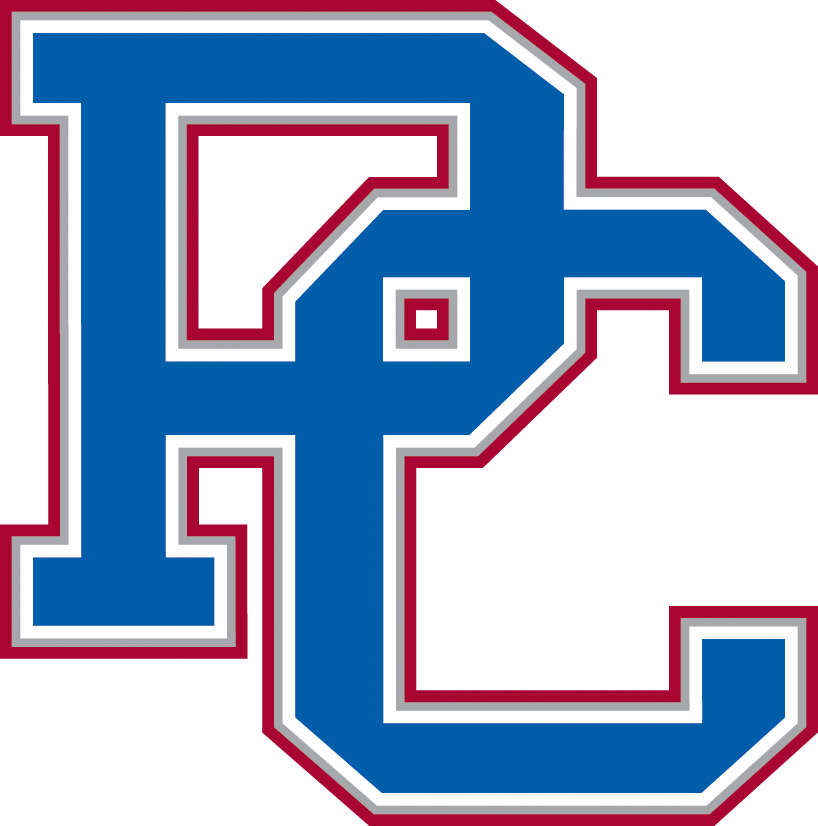
- Conference: Big South Conference
- Record: 0–9, 2 wins vacated (0–5 Big South, 1 win vacated)
- Head coach: Harold Nichols (2nd season)
- Home stadium: Bailey Memorial Stadium

2010 Big South Conference football standings
	Conf.			Overall
Team	W		L	W		L
No. 21 Liberty +	5	–	1	8	–	3
Stony Brook +	5	–	1	6	–	5
Coastal Carolina +^	5	–	1	6	–	6
Gardner–Webb	2	–	4	4	–	7
VMI	2	–	4	3	–	8
Charleston Southern	1	–	5	3	–	8
Presbyterian	1	–	5	2	–	9
$ – Conference champion; ^ – FCS playoff participant; Rankings from The Sports Network poll

The 2010 Presbyterian Blue Hose football team represented Presbyterian College as a member of the Big South Conference during the 2010 NCAA Division I FCS football season Led by second-year head coach Harold Nichols, the Blue Hose finished the season with an overall record of 2–9 and a mark of 1–5 in conference play, tying for sixth place in the Big South. Presbyterian was later vacated both wins from the season because the team has used an ineligible player. The Blue Hose played home games at Bailey Memorial Stadium in Clinton, South Carolina.

== Schedule ==
Date	Time	Opponent	Site	TV	Result	Attendance
September 2	6:30 p.m.	at Wake Forest*	BB&T Field; Winston-Salem, NC	ESPN3	L 13–53	28,205
September 11	3:30 p.m.	at Clemson*	Memorial Stadium; Clemson, SC	ESPN3	L 21–58	70,500
September 18	7:40 p.m.	at The Citadel*	Johnson Hagood Stadium; Charleston, SC		L 14–26	12,792
September 25	Noon	North Greenville*	Bailey Memorial Stadium; Clinton, SC	BSN	L 17–34	3,093
October 2	1:30 p.m.	at VMI	Alumni Memorial Field; Lexington, VA	BSN	L 13–24	5,719
October 16	2:00 p.m.	Coastal Carolina^{†}	Bailey Memorial Stadium; Clinton, SC	BSN	L 7–35	4,753
October 23	1:30 p.m.	at Gardner–Webb	Spangler Stadium; Boiling Springs, NC	BSN	W 26–24 (vacated)	6,125
October 30	1:30 p.m.	Liberty	Bailey Memorial Stadium; Clinton, SC	BSN	L 24–34	3,140
November 6	1:00 p.m.	Stony Brook	Bailey Memorial Stadium; Clinton, SC	SportSouth	L 7–37	1,667
November 13	1:30 p.m.	at Charleston Southern	Buccaneer Field; Charleston, SC		L 39–42	3,429
November 20	1:00 p.m.	Davidson*	Bailey Memorial Stadium; Clinton, SC	BSN	W 42–6 (vacated)	
*Non-conference game; ^{†}Homecoming; All times are in Eastern time
