= 2010 Brown Bears football team =

American college football season

2010 Brown Bears football
- Conference: Ivy League
- Record: 6–4 (5–2 Ivy)
- Head coach: Phil Estes (13th season)
- Offensive coordinator: Frank Sheehan (5th season)
- Offensive scheme: Pro-style
- Defensive coordinator: Michael Kelleher (10th season)
- Base defense: 4–3
- Captains: Patrick Conroy; Kyle Newhall-Caballero; Andrew Serrano
- Home stadium: Brown Stadium

2010 Ivy League football standings
	Conf.			Overall
Team	W		L	W		L
No. 18 Penn $	7	–	0	9	–	1
Harvard	5	–	2	7	–	3
Yale	5	–	2	7	–	3
Brown	5	–	2	6	–	4
Dartmouth	3	–	4	6	–	4
Columbia	2	–	5	4	–	6
Cornell	1	–	6	2	–	8
Princeton	0	–	7	1	–	9
$ – Conference champion; Rankings from The Sports Network poll

The 2010 Brown Bears football team was an American football team that represented Brown University during the 2010 NCAA Division I FCS football season. Brown tied for second in the Ivy League.

In their 14th season under head coach Phil Estes, the Bears compiled a 6–4 record and outscored opponents 247 to 210. Brown averaged 7,970 fans per game. Patrick Conroy, Kyle Newhall-Caballero and Andrew Serrano were the team captains.

The Bears' 5–2 conference record tied them with Harvard and Yale for second place in the Ivy League. Brown outscored Ivy opponents 177 to 136.

Brown played its home games at Brown Stadium in Providence, Rhode Island.

== Schedule ==
Date	Opponent	Site	Result	Attendance	Source
September 18	Stony Brook*	Brown Stadium; Providence, RI	W 33–30 ^{OT}	3,988	
September 25	Harvard	Brown Stadium; Providence, RI	W 29–14	17,360	
October 2	at Rhode Island*	Meade Stadium; Kingston, RI (rivalry)	L 24–27 ^{OT}	7,622	
October 9	at Holy Cross*	Fitton Field; Worcester, MA	L 13–17	4,973	
October 16	at Princeton	Powers Field at Princeton Stadium; Princeton, NJ	W 17–13	6,079	
October 23	Cornell	Brown Stadium; Providence, RI	W 27–14	7,160	
October 30	at No. 21 Penn	Franklin Field; Philadelphia, PA	L 7–24	14,854	
November 6	Yale	Brown Stadium; Providence, RI	L 24–27	6,222	
November 13	at Dartmouth	Memorial Field; Hanover, NH	W 35–28	3,814	
November 20	Columbia	Brown Stadium; Providence, RI	W 38–16	5,122	
*Non-conference game; Rankings from The Sports Network Poll released prior to the game
