= 2010 Yale Bulldogs football team =

American college football season

2010 Yale Bulldogs football
- Conference: Ivy League
- Record: 7–3 (5–2 Ivy)
- Head coach: Tom Williams (2nd season)
- Offensive coordinator: Brian Stark (2nd season)
- Co-offensive coordinator: Kefense Hynson (2nd season)
- Defensive coordinator: Ikaika Malloe (2nd season)
- Home stadium: Yale Bowl

2010 Ivy League football standings
	Conf.			Overall
Team	W		L	W		L
No. 18 Penn $	7	–	0	9	–	1
Harvard	5	–	2	7	–	3
Yale	5	–	2	7	–	3
Brown	5	–	2	6	–	4
Dartmouth	3	–	4	6	–	4
Columbia	2	–	5	4	–	6
Cornell	1	–	6	2	–	8
Princeton	0	–	7	1	–	9
$ – Conference champion; Rankings from The Sports Network poll

The 2010 Yale Bulldogs football team represented Yale University in the 2010 NCAA Division I FCS football season. The Bulldogs were led by second-year head coach Tom Williams and played their home games at the Yale Bowl in New Haven, Connecticut. They completed the season at 7–3 overall, 5–2 in Ivy League play to finish in a tie for second place.

== Schedule ==
Date	Time	Opponent	Site	TV	Result	Attendance	Source
September 18	12:00 p.m.	Georgetown*	Yale Bowl; New Haven, CT		W 40–35	9,358	
September 25	12:30 p.m.	at Cornell	Schoellkopf Field; Ithaca, NY		W 21–7	16,026	
October 2	12:00 p.m.	Albany*	Yale Bowl; New Haven, CT		L 20–23	9,862	
October 9	1:30 p.m.	at Dartmouth	Memorial Field; Hanover, NH		W 23–20	7,156	
October 16	12:00 p.m.	Fordham*	Yale Bowl; New Haven, CT	YES	W 7–6	6,687	
October 23	12:00 p.m.	Penn	Yale Bowl; New Haven, CT	YES	L 20–27	22,293	
October 30	12:00 p.m.	Columbia	Yale Bowl; New Haven, CT	YES	W 31–28	11,912	
November 6	12:30 p.m.	at Brown	Brown Stadium; Providence, RI		W 27–24	6,222	
November 13	12:00 p.m.	Princeton	Yale Bowl; New Haven, CT (rivalry)		W 14–13	27,441	
November 20	12:00 p.m.	at Harvard	Harvard Stadium; Boston, MA (rivalry)	Versus	L 21–28	31,398	
*Non-conference game; All times are in Eastern time

== NFL draft ==
The following Bulldog was selected in the National Football League draft following the season.

Round	Pick	Player	Position	NFL team
7	223	Shane Bannon	RB	Kansas City Chiefs
