= 2010 Victory Bowl =

| Campbellsville Tigers | North Greenville Crusaders |
| (7–4) | (8–3) |
| 16 | 42 |
| Head coach: Perry Thomas | Head coach: Jamey Chadwell |
| | 1 | 2 | 3 | 4 | Total |
|---|---|---|---|---|---|
| Campbellsville | 0 | 0 | 3 | 13 | 16 |
| North Greenville | 7 | 7 | 21 | 7 | 42 |
- Date: November 20, 2010
- Season: 2010
- Stadium: Younts Stadium
- Location: Tigerville, South Carolina
- MVP: Offensive: Idris Anderson (North Greenville) Defensive : Damien Wright (North Greenville)
- Attendance: 4,150

The 2010 Victory Bowl was a college football post-season bowl game. The game was played on November 20, 2010, between NCAA Division II North Greenville University and NAIA Campbellsville University at Younts Stadium in Tigerville, South Carolina.

Campbellsville's offense achieved 460 yards in 100 plays compared to North Greenville's 362 yards. Campbellsville dominated the air with 333 passing yards but only reached the end zone twice. The final score was North Greenville 42, Campbellsville 16.

== Scoring Summary ==
Scoring summary

| Quarter | Time | Drive | | | Team | Scoring information | Score | |
| Quarter | Time | Plays | Yards | TOP | Team | Scoring information | Campbellsville Tigers | North Greenville Crusaders |
|---|---|---|---|---|---|---|---|---|
| 1 | | 1 | 46 | 0:09 | North Greenville Crusaders | Fred Martino Jr. 46-yard touchdown reception from Isiah Johnson, Stephen Arneson kick Good | 0 | 7 |
| 2 | 7:21 | 12 | 80 | 6:19 | North Greenville Crusaders | Idris Anderson 1-yard touchdown run, Stephen Arneson kick Good | 0 | 14 |
| 3 | 11:50 | 6 | 60 | 4:04 | North Greenville Crusaders | Teryan Rucker 15-yard touchdown run, Stephen Arneson kick Good | 0 | 21 |
| 3 | 9:08 | 11 | 45 | 2:41 | Campbellsville Tigers | 30-yard field goal by David Hon | 3 | 21 |
| 3 | 3:09 | 3 | 69 | 1:39 | North Greenville Crusaders | Willy Korn 12-yard touchdown run, Stephen Arneson kick Good | 3 | 28 |
| 3 | 0:00 | 5 | 73 | 3:01 | North Greenville Crusaders | Idris Anderson 45-yard touchdown run, Stephen Arneson kick Good | 3 | 35 |
| 4 | 7:57 | 7 | 64 | 1:33 | Campbellsville Tigers | Dexter McAfee 7-yard touchdown reception from Robert Hill, 2-point Robert Hill Pass Failed | 9 | 35 |
| 4 | 7:52 | - | - | - | North Greenville Crusaders | Jam Robinson 39 Yard Kickoff Return Touchdown, Trey Walpole Kick Good | 9 | 42 |
| 4 | 1:48 | 4 | 45 | 0:52 | Campbellsville Tigers | Harold Small 23-yard touchdown reception from Will Warf, David Hon kick Good | 16 | 42 |
| "TOP" = time of possession. For other American football terms, see Glossary of American football. | | | | | | | Campbellsville Tigers | North Greenville Crusaders |
