= 2010 Charleston Southern Buccaneers football team =

American college football season

2010 Charleston Southern Buccaneers football
- Conference: Big South Conference
- Record: 3–8 (1–5 Big South)
- Head coach: Jay Mills (8th season)
- Defensive coordinator: Thielen Smith (3rd season)
- Home stadium: Buccaneer Field

2010 Big South Conference football standings
	Conf.			Overall
Team	W		L	W		L
No. 21 Liberty +	5	–	1	8	–	3
Stony Brook +	5	–	1	6	–	5
Coastal Carolina +^	5	–	1	6	–	6
Gardner–Webb	2	–	4	4	–	7
VMI	2	–	4	3	–	8
Charleston Southern	1	–	5	3	–	8
Presbyterian	1	–	5	2	–	9
$ – Conference champion; ^ – FCS playoff participant; Rankings from The Sports Network poll

The 2010 Charleston Southern Buccaneers football team represented Charleston Southern University as a member of the Big South Conference during the 2010 NCAA Division I FCS football season. Led by eighth-year head coach Jay Mills, the Buccaneers compiled an overall record of 3–8 with a mark of 1–5 in conference play, and tied for last in the Big South.

== Schedule ==
Date	Time	Opponent	Site	TV	Result	Attendance	Source
September 4	1:30 pm	North Greenville*	Buccaneer Field; Charleston, SC		W 41–31	3,421	
September 11	1:30 pm	Wofford*	Buccaneer Field; Charleston, SC		L 23–34	3,297	
September 18	1:30 pm	Mars Hill*	Buccaneer Field; Charleston, SC		W 28–14	3,021	
September 25	11:30 pm	at Hawaii*	Aloha Stadium; Halawa, HI	Oceanic PPV	L 7–66	30,300	
October 9	3:30 pm	at No. 24 Liberty	Lynchburg City Stadium; Lynchburg, VA	WTLU	L 20–44	18,587	
October 16	12:30 pm	Gardner–Webb	Buccaneer Field; Charleston, SC	ESPN3	L 25–35	4,000	
October 23	11:30 am	VMI^{†}	Buccaneer Field; Charleston, SC	SPS	L 16–34	3,476	
October 30	3:00 pm	at Stony Brook	Kenneth P. LaValle Stadium; Stony Brook, NY	Big South Net	L 21–41	4,007	
November 6	12:30 pm	at Kentucky*	Commonwealth Stadium; Lexington, KY	BBSN	L 21–49	61,884	
November 13	1:30 pm	Presbyterian	Buccaneer Field; Charleston, SC		W 42–39	3,429	
November 20	1:00 pm	at Coastal Carolina	Brooks Stadium; Conway, SC		L 3–70	7,503	
*Non-conference game; ^{†}Homecoming; Rankings from The Sports Network Poll released prior to the game; All times are in Eastern time
