= 2010 Gardner–Webb Runnin' Bulldogs football team =

American college football season

2010 Gardner–Webb Runnin' Bulldogs football
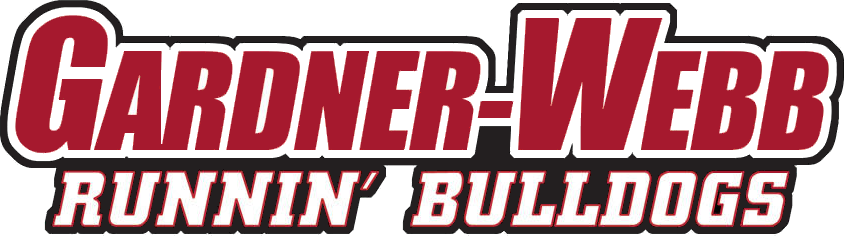
- Conference: Big South Conference
- Record: 4–7 (2–4 Big South)
- Head coach: Steve Patton (14th season)
- Defensive coordinator: John Windham (4th season)
- Home stadium: Ernest W. Spangler Stadium

2010 Big South Conference football standings
	Conf.			Overall
Team	W		L	W		L
No. 21 Liberty +	5	–	1	8	–	3
Stony Brook +	5	–	1	6	–	5
Coastal Carolina +^	5	–	1	6	–	6
Gardner–Webb	2	–	4	4	–	7
VMI	2	–	4	3	–	8
Charleston Southern	1	–	5	3	–	8
Presbyterian	1	–	5	2	–	9
$ – Conference champion; ^ – FCS playoff participant; Rankings from The Sports Network poll

The 2010 Gardner–Webb Runnin' Bulldogs football team represented Gardner–Webb University as a member of the Big South Conference during the 2010 NCAA Division I FCS football season. Led by Steve Patton in his 14th-year and final season as head coach, the Runnin' Bulldogs compiled an overall record of 4–7 with a mark of 2–4 in conference play, tying for fourth place in the Big South. Gardner–Webb played home games at Ernest W. Spangler Stadium in Boiling Springs, North Carolina.

== Schedule ==
Date	Time	Opponent	Site	TV	Result	Attendance	Source
September 4	6:00 pm	Brevard*	Ernest W. Spangler Stadium; Boiling Springs, NC		W 28–14	4,755	
September 11	12:00 pm	at Akron*	InfoCision Stadium; Akron, OH		W 38–37 ^{OT}	10,046	
September 18	6:00 pm	Western Carolina*	Ernest W. Spangler Stadium; Boiling Springs, NC		L 14–28	5,780	
September 25	7:00 pm	at Sam Houston State*	Bowers Stadium; Huntsville, TX		L 14–30	8,030	
October 2	6:00 pm	at Old Dominion*	Foreman Field; Norfolk, VA		L 7–14	19,782	
October 16	12:30 pm	at Charleston Southern	Buccaneer Field; North Charleston, SC	ESPN3	W 35–25	4,000	
October 23	1:30 pm	Presbyterian	Ernest W. Spangler Stadium; Boiling Springs, NC	BSN	L 24–26	6,125	
October 30	1:30 pm	Coastal Carolina	Ernest W. Spangler Stadium; Boiling Springs, NC		L 27–30 ^{OT}	3,750	
November 6	3:30 pm	at No. 12 Liberty	Williams Stadium; Lynchburg, VA	ESPN3	L 14–40	16,441	
November 13	1:00 pm	at Stony Brook	Kenneth P. LaValle Stadium; Stony Brook, NY	Big South Net	L 3–55	3,502	
November 20	11:30 am	VMI	Ernest W. Spangler Stadium; Boiling Springs, NC	SPS	W 10–7	3,950	
*Non-conference game; Rankings from The Sports Network Poll released prior to the game; All times are in Eastern time
