= 2010 Colgate Raiders football team =

American college football season

2010 Colgate Raiders football
- Conference: Patriot League
- Record: 7–4 (3–2 Patriot)
- Head coach: Dick Biddle (15th season)
- Captain: Greg Sullivan
- Home stadium: Andy Kerr Stadium

2010 Patriot League football standings
	Conf.			Overall
Team	W		L	W		L
No. 14 Lehigh $^	5	–	0	10	–	3
Colgate	3	–	2	7	–	4
Holy Cross	3	–	2	6	–	5
Georgetown	2	–	3	4	–	7
Lafayette	1	–	4	2	–	9
Bucknell	1	–	4	1	–	10
Fordham	0	–	0	5	–	6
$ – Conference champion; ^ – FCS playoff participant; Rankings from The Sports Network poll

The 2010 Colgate Raiders football team was an American football team that represented Colgate University during the 2010 NCAA Division I FCS football season. Colgate tied for second in the Patriot League.

In its 15th season under head coach Dick Biddle, the team compiled a 7–4 record. Greg Sullivan was the team captain.

The Raiders outscored opponents 314 to 240. Their 3–2 conference record tied with Holy Cross for second-best in the Patriot League standings. Colgate's season-ending win over Fordham did not count in its league record, as Fordham had been disqualified from the championship after admitting scholarship players.

Colgate was ranked No. 22 in the preseason national top 25, but a close opening-week win over unranked Monmouth dropped them to No. 25, and the subsequent loss to Furman saw them eliminated from the rankings altogether. The Raiders remained unranked for the rest of the year.

The team played its home games at Andy Kerr Stadium in Hamilton, New York.

== Schedule ==
Date	Opponent	Site	Result	Attendance	Source
September 4	Monmouth*	Andy Kerr Stadium; Hamilton, NY	W 30–29	7,260	
September 11	at Furman*	Paladin Stadium; Greenville, SC	L 15–45	10,284	
September 25	at Syracuse*	Carrier Dome; Syracuse, NY (rivalry)	L 7–42	38,068	
October 2	Georgetown^{†}	Andy Kerr Stadium; Hamilton, NY	W 34–3		
October 9	at Princeton*	Powers Field at Princeton Stadium; Princeton, NJ	W 44–10	6,650	
October 16	at Cornell*	Schoellkopf Field; Ithaca, NY (rivalry)	W 44–3	6,123	
October 23	Holy Cross	Andy Kerr Stadium; Hamilton, NY	L 24–31	6,213	
October 30	at Lehigh	Goodman Stadium; Bethlehem, PA	L 14–44	6,784	
November 6	Lafayette	Andy Kerr Stadium; Hamilton, NY	W 24–14	4,873	
November 13	at Bucknell	Christy Mathewson–Memorial Stadium; Lewisburg, PA	W 31–7		
November 20	at Fordham	Coffey Field; Bronx, NY	W 47–12		
*Non-conference game; ^{†}Homecoming
