= 2010 Albany Great Danes football team =

American college football season

2010 Albany Great Danes football
- Conference: Northeast Conference
- Record: 6–5 (4–4 NEC)
- Head coach: Bob Ford (41st season)
- Offensive coordinator: Ryan McCarthy (3rd season)
- Defensive coordinator: Mike Simpson (24th season)
- Home stadium: University Field

2010 Northeast Conference football standings
	Conf.			Overall
Team	W		L	W		L
Robert Morris +^	7	–	1	8	–	3
Central Connecticut State +	7	–	1	8	–	3
Duquesne	5	–	3	7	–	4
Bryant	4	–	4	7	–	4
Albany	4	–	4	6	–	5
Wagner	3	–	5	5	–	6
Monmouth	3	–	5	3	–	8
Sacred Heart	2	–	6	4	–	7
Saint Francis (PA)	1	–	7	1	–	10
+ – Conference co-champions; ^ – FCS playoff participant

The 2010 Albany Great Danes football team represented the University at Albany, SUNY as a member of the Northeast Conference (NEC) during the 2010 NCAA Division I FCS football season. Led by 41-year head coach Bob Ford, the Great Danes compiled an overall record of 6–5 with a mark of 4–4 in conference play, tying for fourth place in the NEC. The team played home games at University Field in Albany New York.

== Schedule ==
Date	Time	Opponent	Site	Result	Attendance	Source
September 2	7:00 pm	at Maine*	Alfond Stadium; Orono, ME	W 3–0	7,610	
September 11	7:00 pm	at No. 10 Stephen F. Austin*	Homer Bryce Stadium; Nacogdoches, TX	L 14–59	9,483	
September 25	12:00 pm	at Duquesne	Arthur J. Rooney Athletic Field; Pittsburgh, PA	L 17–28	1,287	
October 2	12:00 pm	at Yale*	Yale Bowl; New Haven, CT	W 23–20	9,862	
October 9	1:00 pm	Saint Francis (PA)^{†}	University Field; Albany, NY	W 48–0	6,624	
October 16	12:00 pm	at Robert Morris	Joe Walton Stadium; Moon Township, PA	L 0–38	3,078	
October 22	7:00 pm	Central Connecticut State	University Field; Albany, NY	L 27–30 ^{OT}	2,058	
October 30	1:00 pm	at Bryant	Bulldog Stadium; Smithfield, RI	L 7–24	3,756	
November 6	1:00 pm	at Sacred Heart	Campus Field; Fairfield, CT	W 35–23	1,296	
November 13	1:00 pm	Wagner	University Field; Albany, NY	W 24–14	1,634	
November 20	1:00 pm	Monmouth	University Field; Albany, NY	W 28–19	1,780	
*Non-conference game; ^{†}Homecoming; Rankings from The Sports Network Poll released prior to the game; All times are in Eastern time
