= 2010 Lafayette Leopards football team =

American college football season

2010 Lafayette Leopards football
- Conference: Patriot League
- Record: 2–9 (1–4 Patriot)
- Head coach: Frank Tavani (11th season)
- Offensive coordinator: Mickey Fein (2nd season)
- Offensive scheme: Multiple
- Defensive coordinator: John Loose (11th season)
- Base defense: 4–3
- Home stadium: Fisher Stadium

2010 Patriot League football standings
	Conf.			Overall
Team	W		L	W		L
No. 14 Lehigh $^	5	–	0	10	–	3
Colgate	3	–	2	7	–	4
Holy Cross	3	–	2	6	–	5
Georgetown	2	–	3	4	–	7
Lafayette	1	–	4	2	–	9
Bucknell	1	–	4	1	–	10
Fordham	0	–	0	5	–	6
$ – Conference champion; ^ – FCS playoff participant; Rankings from The Sports Network poll

The 2010 Lafayette Leopards football team represented Lafayette College in the 2010 NCAA Division I FCS football season. The team was led by Frank Tavani, in his 11th season as head coach. The Leopards played their home games at Fisher Stadium in Easton, Pennsylvania.

After being ranked in the Sports Network and Coaches Top 25 poll in each of the past six seasons, the Leopards finished an uncharacteristic 2–9 overall and 1–4 in the Patriot League. The Leopards lost to Georgetown in their opening game for the first time since 2003 and lost their third consecutive game against arch-rival Lehigh University in the 146th meeting of The Rivalry.

== Schedule ==
Date	Time	Opponent	Site	TV	Result	Attendance	Source
September 11	6:00 pm	Georgetown	Fisher Stadium; Easton, PA	LSN	L 24–28	7,635	
September 18	6:00 pm	at Penn*	Franklin Field; Philadelphia, PA	LSN	L 14–19	11,299	
September 25	6:00 pm	at Princeton*	Powers Field at Princeton Stadium; Princeton, NJ	LSN	L 33–36 ^{OT}	9,327	
October 2	12:00 pm	Harvard*	Fisher Stadium; Easton, PA	LSN	L 10–35	6,665	
October 9	12:00 pm	at Columbia*	Robert K. Kraft Field at Lawrence A. Wien Stadium; New York, NY	LSN	L 28–42	2,998	
October 16	1:00 pm	Stony Brook*^{†}	Fisher Stadium; Easton, PA	LSN	W 28–21	6,036	
October 23	1:00 pm	at Fordham	Coffey Field; Bronx, NY	LSN	L 10–14	4,787	
October 30	1:00 pm	at Bucknell	Christy Mathewson–Memorial Stadium; Lewisburg, PA	LSN	W 33–22	3,275	
November 6	1:00 pm	at Colgate	Andy Kerr Stadium; Hamilton, NY	LSN	L 14–24	4,873	
November 13	12:00 pm	Holy Cross	Fisher Stadium; Easton, PA	LSN	L 27–37	4,846	
November 20	12:00 pm	No. 22 Lehigh	Fisher Stadium; Easton, PA (The Rivalry)	LSN	L 13–20	13,982	
*Non-conference game; ^{†}Homecoming; Rankings from The Sports Network Poll released prior to the game; All times are in Eastern time
