= 2010 Harvard Crimson football team =

American college football season

2010 Harvard Crimson football
- Conference: Ivy League
- Record: 7–3 (5–2 Ivy)
- Head coach: Tim Murphy (17th season)
- Offensive coordinator: Joel Lamb (5th season)
- Offensive scheme: Spread
- Defensive coordinator: Scott Larkee (2nd season)
- Base defense: 4–3
- Home stadium: Harvard Stadium

2010 Ivy League football standings
	Conf.			Overall
Team	W		L	W		L
No. 18 Penn $	7	–	0	9	–	1
Harvard	5	–	2	7	–	3
Yale	5	–	2	7	–	3
Brown	5	–	2	6	–	4
Dartmouth	3	–	4	6	–	4
Columbia	2	–	5	4	–	6
Cornell	1	–	6	2	–	8
Princeton	0	–	7	1	–	9
$ – Conference champion; Rankings from The Sports Network poll

The 2010 Harvard Crimson football team was an American football team that represented Harvard University in the 2010 NCAA Division I FCS football season. They were led by 17th-year head coach Tim Murphy and played their home games at Harvard Stadium. They finished the season with seven wins and three losses (7–3, 5–2 in Ivy League play).

== Schedule ==
Date	Opponent	Site	TV	Result	Attendance	Source
September 18	Holy Cross*	Harvard Stadium; Boston, MA		W 34–6	21,704	
September 25	at Brown	Brown Stadium; Providence, RI		L 14–29	17,360	
October 2	at Lafayette*	Fisher Stadium; Easton, PA		W 35–10	6,665	
October 9	Cornell	Harvard Stadium; Boston, MA		W 31–17	11,434	
October 16	Lehigh*	Harvard Stadium; Boston, MA		L 19–21	12,252	
October 23	at Princeton	Powers Field at Princeton Stadium; Princeton, NJ (rivalry)		W 45–28	9,697	
October 30	at Dartmouth	Memorial Stadium; Hanover, NH (rivalry)		W 30–14	9,142	
November 6	Columbia	Harvard Stadium; Boston, MA		W 23–7	7,801	
November 13	at Penn	Franklin Field; Philadelphia, PA (rivalry)		L 14–34	12,546	
November 20	Yale	Harvard Stadium; Boston, MA (The Game)	Versus	W 28–21	31,398	
*Non-conference game
