= 2010 Lehigh Mountain Hawks football team =

American college football season

2010 Lehigh Mountain Hawks football

Patriot League champion

FCS Playoffs Second Round, L 20–42 vs. Delaware
- Conference: Patriot League

Ranking
- Sports Network: No. 14
- FCS Coaches: No. 14
- Record: 10–3 (5–0 Patriot)
- Head coach: Andy Coen (5th season)
- Offensive coordinator: Dave Cecchini (1st season)
- Defensive coordinator: Dave Kotulski (5th season)
- Home stadium: Goodman Stadium

2010 Patriot League football standings
	Conf.			Overall
Team	W		L	W		L
No. 14 Lehigh $^	5	–	0	10	–	3
Colgate	3	–	2	7	–	4
Holy Cross	3	–	2	6	–	5
Georgetown	2	–	3	4	–	7
Lafayette	1	–	4	2	–	9
Bucknell	1	–	4	1	–	10
Fordham	0	–	0	5	–	6
$ – Conference champion; ^ – FCS playoff participant; Rankings from The Sports Network poll

The 2010 Lehigh Mountain Hawks football team represented Lehigh University in the 2010 NCAA Division I FCS football season. The team was led by fifth-year head coach Andy Coen and played its home games at Goodman Stadium. They finished the regular season with a 9–2 record overall and a 5–0 record in Patriot League play, making them conference champions. The team qualified for the playoffs, in which they were eliminated in the second round by Delaware.

== Schedule ==
Date	Opponent	Rank	Site	Result	Attendance	Source
September 4	at Drake*		Drake Stadium; Des Moines, IA	W 28–14	3,628	
September 11	No. 2 Villanova*		Goodman Stadium; Bethlehem, PA	L 28–14	8,168	
September 18	Princeton*		Goodman Stadium; Bethlehem, PA	W 35–22	6,344	
September 25	at No. 16 New Hampshire*		Cowell Stadium; Durham, NH	L 10–31	8,144	
October 9	Fordham*		Goodman Stadium; Bethlehem, PA	W 21–17	5,176	
October 16	at Harvard*		Harvard Stadium; Boston, MA	W 21–19	12,252	
October 23	Bucknell		Goodman Stadium; Bethlehem, PA	W 32–10	7,571	
October 30	Colgate		Goodman Stadium; Bethlehem, PA	W 44–14	6,784	
November 6	at Holy Cross		Fitton Field; Worcester, MA	W 34–17	5,892	
November 13	at Georgetown		Multi-Sport Field; Washington, DC	W 24–7	2,819	
November 20	at Lafayette	No. 22	Fisher Stadium; Easton, PA (The Rivalry)	W 20–13	13,982	
November 27	at No. 16 Northern Iowa*	No. 19	UNI-Dome; Cedar Falls, IA (FCS First Round)	W 14–7	5,990	
December 4	at No. 2 Delaware*	No. 19	Delaware Stadium; Newark, DE (FCS Second Round)	L 21–17	13,649	
*Non-conference game; Rankings from The Sports Network Poll released prior to the game
