= 2010 Bucknell Bison football team =

American college football season

2010 Bucknell Bison football
- Conference: Patriot League
- Record: 1–10 (1–4 Patriot)
- Head coach: Joe Susan (1st season)
- Offensive coordinator: Bryan Bossard (1st season)
- Defensive coordinator: Clayton Carlin (1st season)
- Captains: Josh Eden; Travis Nissley; Jason Vollmar; Marlon Woods
- Home stadium: Christy Mathewson–Memorial Stadium

2010 Patriot League football standings
	Conf.			Overall
Team	W		L	W		L
No. 14 Lehigh $^	5	–	0	10	–	3
Colgate	3	–	2	7	–	4
Holy Cross	3	–	2	6	–	5
Georgetown	2	–	3	4	–	7
Lafayette	1	–	4	2	–	9
Bucknell	1	–	4	1	–	10
Fordham	0	–	0	5	–	6
$ – Conference champion; ^ – FCS playoff participant; Rankings from The Sports Network poll

The 2010 Bucknell Bison football team was an American football team that represented Bucknell University during the 2010 NCAA Division I FCS football season. Bucknell tied for last among Patriot League competitors.

In its first season under head coach Joe Susan, the Bison compiled a 1–10 record. Josh Eden, Travis Nissley, Jason Vollmar and Marlon Woods were the team captains.

The team was outscored 310 to 151. Its 1–4 conference record tied with Lafayette for fourth place among the six teams eligible for the Patriot League championship.

Fordham was excluded from the championship; its games did not count in the Patriot League standings, and are shown on the standings tables below the actual last-place teams, Bucknell and Lafayette.

Bucknell played its home games at Christy Mathewson–Memorial Stadium on the university campus in Lewisburg, Pennsylvania.

== Schedule ==
Date	Opponent	Site	Result	Attendance	Source
September 4	at Duquesne*	Rooney Field; Pittsburgh, PA	L 13–17	2,240	
September 11	at Marist*	Tenney Stadium at Leonidoff Field; Poughkeepsie, NY	L 3–14		
September 18	Dartmouth*	Christy Mathewson–Memorial Stadium; Lewisburg, PA	L 20–43		
October 2	Cornell^*	Christy Mathewson–Memorial Stadium; Lewisburg, PA	L 12–21	7,826	
October 9	Penn*	Christy Mathewson–Memorial Stadium; Lewisburg, PA	L 10–31	2,213	
October 16	at Georgetown	Multi-Purpose Field; Washington, DC	W 24–21	2,821	
October 23	at Lehigh	Goodman Stadium; Bethlehem, PA	L 10–32	7,571	
October 30	Lafayette^{†}	Christy Mathewson–Memorial Stadium; Lewisburg, PA	L 22–33	3,275	
November 6	Fordham	Christy Mathewson–Memorial Stadium; Lewisburg, PA	L 21–33		
November 13	Colgate	Christy Mathewson–Memorial Stadium; Lewisburg, PA	L 7–31		
November 20	at Holy Cross	Fitton Field; Worcester, MA	L 9–34	4,297	
*Non-conference game; ^{†}Homecoming; ^ Parents Weekend
