= 2010 Princeton Tigers football team =

American college football season

2010 Princeton Tigers football
- Conference: Ivy League
- Record: 1–9 (0–7 Ivy)
- Head coach: Bob Surace (1st season)
- Offensive coordinator: James Perry (1st season)
- Offensive scheme: Spread option
- Defensive coordinator: Jared Backus (2nd season)
- Base defense: 4–3
- Captains: Steven Cody; Jordan Culbreath; Matt Zimmerman
- Home stadium: Powers Field at Princeton Stadium

2010 Ivy League football standings
| | Conf. | | | Overall |
| Team | W | | L | W | | L |
|---|---|---|---|---|---|---|
| No. 18 Penn $ | 7 | – | 0 | 9 | – | 1 |
| Harvard | 5 | – | 2 | 7 | – | 3 |
| Yale | 5 | – | 2 | 7 | – | 3 |
| Brown | 5 | – | 2 | 6 | – | 4 |
| Dartmouth | 3 | – | 4 | 6 | – | 4 |
| Columbia | 2 | – | 5 | 4 | – | 6 |
| Cornell | 1 | – | 6 | 2 | – | 8 |
| Princeton | 0 | – | 7 | 1 | – | 9 |
$ – Conference champion; Rankings from The Sports Network poll

The 2010 Princeton Tigers football team was an American football team that represented Princeton University during the 2010 NCAA Division I FCS football season. The Tigers finished last in the Ivy League. Princeton averaged 7,724 fans per game.

In their first year under head coach Bob Surace, the Tigers compiled a 1–9 record, and were outscored 334 to 165. Steven Cody, Jordan Culbreath and Matt Zimmerman were the team captains.

Princeton's winless (0–7) conference record was the worst in the Ivy League standings. The Tigers were outscored 222 to 97 by Ivy opponents.

The Tigers played their home games at Powers Field at Princeton Stadium on the university campus in Princeton, New Jersey.

== Schedule ==
| Date | Opponent | Site | Result | Attendance | Source |
|---|---|---|---|---|---|
| September 18 | at Lehigh* | Goodman Stadium; Bethlehem, PA | L 22–35 | 6,344 | |
| September 25 | Lafayette* | Powers Field at Princeton Stadium; Princeton, NJ | W 36–33 ^{2OT} | 9,327 | |
| October 2 | at Columbia | Robert K. Kraft Field at Lawrence A. Wien Stadium; New York, NY | L 14–42 | 4,836 | |
| October 9 | Colgate* | Powers Field at Princeton Stadium; Princeton, NJ | L 10–44 | 6,650 | |
| October 16 | Brown | Powers Field at Princeton Stadium; Princeton, NJ | L 13–17 | 6,079 | |
| October 23 | Harvard | Powers Field at Princeton Stadium; Princeton, NJ (rivalry) | L 28–45 | 9,697 | |
| October 30 | at Cornell | Schoellkopf Field; Ithaca, NY | L 19–21 | 5,119 | |
| November 6 | No. 18 Penn | Powers Field at Princeton Stadium; Princeton, NJ (rivalry) | L 10–52 | 8,241 | |
| November 13 | at Yale | Yale Bowl; New Haven, CT (rivalry) | L 13–14 | 27,441 | |
| November 20 | Dartmouth | Powers Field at Princeton Stadium; Princeton, NJ | L 0–31 | 6,355 | |
*Non-conference game; Rankings from The Sports Network Poll released prior to the game
