= 2010 Georgetown Hoyas football team =

American college football season

2010 Georgetown Hoyas football
- Conference: Patriot League
- Record: 4–7 (2–3 Patriot)
- Head coach: Kevin Kelly (5th season)
- Offensive coordinator: Dave Patenaude (1st season)
- Defensive coordinator: Rob Sgarlata (5th season)
- Home stadium: Multi-Sport Field

2010 Patriot League football standings
	Conf.			Overall
Team	W		L	W		L
No. 14 Lehigh $^	5	–	0	10	–	3
Colgate	3	–	2	7	–	4
Holy Cross	3	–	2	6	–	5
Georgetown	2	–	3	4	–	7
Lafayette	1	–	4	2	–	9
Bucknell	1	–	4	1	–	10
Fordham	0	–	0	5	–	6
$ – Conference champion; ^ – FCS playoff participant; Rankings from The Sports Network poll

The 2010 Georgetown Hoyas football team represented Georgetown University as a member of the Patriot League during the 2010 NCAA Division I FCS football season. Led by fifth-year head coach Kevin Kelly, the Hoyas compiled an overall record of 4–7 with a mark of 2–3 in conference play, placing fourth in the Patriot League. Georgetown played home games at Multi-Sport Field in Washington, D.C.

To open the season, Georgetown broke a 12-game losing streak by beating the Davidson on the road.

== Schedule ==
Date	Time	Opponent	Site	TV	Result	Attendance	Source
September 4	6:00 pm	at Davidson*	Richardson Stadium; Davidson, NC		W 20–10	4,733	
September 11	6:00 pm	at Lafayette	Fisher Stadium; Easton, PA	CSN	W 28–24	7,635	
September 18	12:00 pm	at Yale*	Yale Bowl; New Haven, CT		L 35–40	9,358	
September 25	1:00 pm	Holy Cross	Multi-Sport Field; Washington, DC		W 17–7	3,211	
October 2	1:00 pm	at Colgate	Andy Kerr Stadium; Hamilton, NY		L 3–34	6,687	
October 9	1:00 pm	Wagner*	Multi-Sport Field; Washington, DC		L 16–22 ^{2OT}	1,582	
October 16	1:00 pm	Bucknell	Multi-Sport Field; Washington, DC		L 21–24	2,821	
October 23	1:00 pm	at Sacred Heart*	Campus Field; Fairfield, CT		L 20–33	3,189	
October 30	1:00 pm	at Fordham	Coffey Field; Bronx, NY		L 19–24	2,821	
November 13	1:00 pm	Lehigh	Multi-Sport Field; Washington, DC		L 7–24	2,819	
November 20	1:00 pm	Marist*	Multi-Sport Field; Washington, DC		W 14–7	2,013	
*Non-conference game; All times are in Eastern time
