= 2010 Cornell Big Red football team =

American college football season

2010 Cornell Big Red football
- Conference: Ivy League
- Record: 2–8 (1–6 Ivy)
- Head coach: Kent Austin (1st season)
- Offensive coordinator: Jeff Fela (1st season)
- Defensive coordinator: Ron McCrone (1st season)
- Captain: Game captains
- Home stadium: Schoellkopf Field

2010 Ivy League football standings
	Conf.			Overall
Team	W		L	W		L
No. 18 Penn $	7	–	0	9	–	1
Harvard	5	–	2	7	–	3
Yale	5	–	2	7	–	3
Brown	5	–	2	6	–	4
Dartmouth	3	–	4	6	–	4
Columbia	2	–	5	4	–	6
Cornell	1	–	6	2	–	8
Princeton	0	–	7	1	–	9
$ – Conference champion; Rankings from The Sports Network poll

The 2010 Cornell Big Red football team was an American football team that represented Cornell University in the 2010 NCAA Division I FCS football season. They were led by first-year head coach Kent Austin and played their home games at Schoellkopf Field. Cornell finished the season 2–8 overall and 1–6 in Ivy League play to place seventh. Cornel averaged 6,877 fans per gam.

== Schedule ==
Date	Time	Opponent	Site	Result	Attendance	Source
September 18	1:00 p.m.	at Wagner*	Wagner College Stadium; Staten Island, NY	L 7–41	2,237	
September 25	12:30 p.m.	Yale^{†}	Schoellkopf Field; Ithaca, NY	L 7–21	16,026	
October 2	3:30 p.m.	at Bucknell*	Christy Mathewson–Memorial Stadium; Lewisburg, PA	W 21–12	7,826	
October 9	12:00 p.m.	at Harvard	Harvard Stadium; Boston, MA	L 17–31	11,434	
October 16	12:30 p.m.	Colgate*	Schoellkopf Field; Ithaca, NY (rivalry)	L 3–44	6,123	
October 23	12:30 p.m.	at Brown	Brown Stadium; Providence, RI	L 14–27	7,160	
October 30	12:30 p.m.	Princeton	Schoellkopf Field; Ithaca, NY	W 21–19	5,119	
November 6	12:30 p.m.	Dartmouth	Schoellkopf Field; Ithaca, NY (rivalry)	L 10–28	3,787	
November 13	12:30 p.m.	at Columbia	Robert K. Kraft Field at Lawrence A. Wien Stadium; New York, NY (rivalry)	L 17–20	5,318	
November 20	12:30 p.m.	No. 16 Penn	Schoellkopf Field; Ithaca, NY (rivalry)	L 7–31	3,333	
*Non-conference game; ^{†}Homecoming; Rankings from The Sports Network Poll released prior to the game; All times are in Eastern time

== Game summaries ==
=== at Wagner ===
	1	2	3	4	Total
Big Red	0	0	0	7	7
Seahawks	7	13	21	0	41

=== vs Yale ===
	1	2	3	4	Total
Bulldogs	7	0	14	0	21
Big Red	7	0	0	0	7

=== at Bucknell ===
	1	2	3	4	Total
Big Red	7	7	7	0	21
Bison	0	3	9	0	12

=== at Harvard ===
	1	2	3	4	Total
Big Red	0	0	3	14	17
Crimson	7	0	3	21	31

=== vs Colgate ===
	1	2	3	4	Total
Raiders	3	28	7	6	44
Big Red	0	0	3	0	3

=== at Brown ===
	1	2	3	4	Total
Big Red	7	0	0	7	14
Bears	10	10	0	7	27

=== vs Princeton ===
	1	2	3	4	Total
Tigers	0	6	0	13	19
Big Red	7	0	14	0	21

=== vs Dartmouth ===
	1	2	3	4	Total
Big Green	7	0	7	14	28
Big Red	0	10	0	0	10

=== at Columbia ===
	1	2	3	4	Total
Big Red	7	3	7	0	17
Lions	0	3	0	17	20

=== vs No. 16 Penn ===
	1	2	3	4	Total
No. 16 Quakers	10	14	7	0	31
Big Red	0	0	0	7	7
