= 2010 Liberty Flames football team =

American college football season

2010 Liberty Flames football
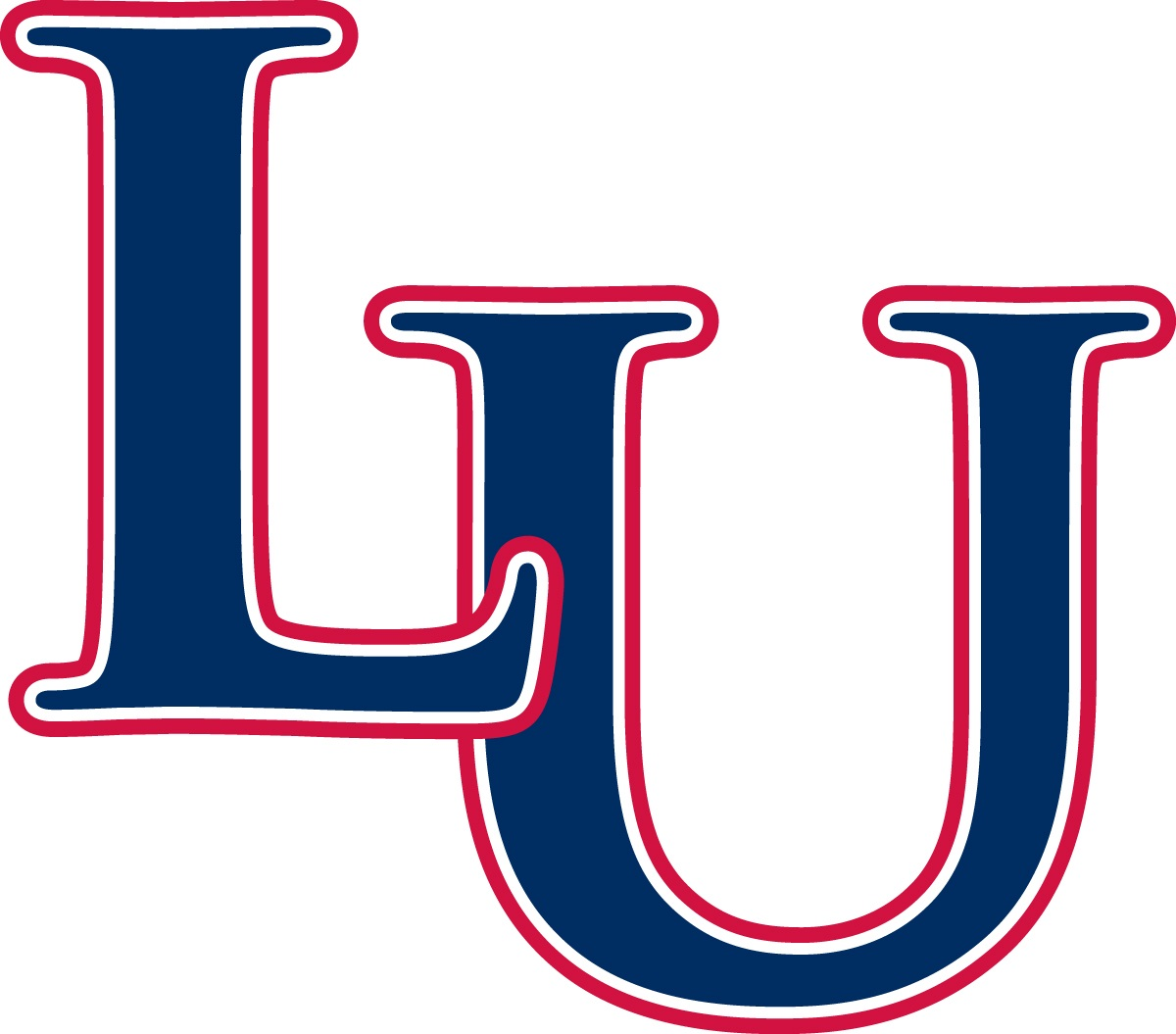

Big South co-champion
- Conference: Big South Conference

Ranking
- Sports Network: No. 18
- Record: 8–3 (5–1 Big South)
- Head coach: Danny Rocco (5th season)
- Offensive coordinator: Brandon Streeter (2nd as OC, 5th overall season)
- Defensive coordinator: Tom Clark (5th season)
- Home stadium: Williams Stadium Lynchburg City Stadium

2010 Big South Conference football standings
	Conf.			Overall
Team	W		L	W		L
No. 21 Liberty +	5	–	1	8	–	3
Stony Brook +	5	–	1	6	–	5
Coastal Carolina +^	5	–	1	6	–	6
Gardner–Webb	2	–	4	4	–	7
VMI	2	–	4	3	–	8
Charleston Southern	1	–	5	3	–	8
Presbyterian	1	–	5	2	–	9
$ – Conference champion; ^ – FCS playoff participant; Rankings from The Sports Network poll

The 2010 Liberty Flames football team represented Liberty University in the 2010 NCAA Division I FCS football season. The Flames were led by fifth-year head coach Danny Rocco and played their home games at Williams Stadium and Lynchburg City Stadium. They were a member of the Big South Conference. They finished the season 8–3, 5–1 in Big South play to finish in a three-way tie for first.

== Schedule ==
Date	Time	Opponent	Rank	Site	TV	Result	Attendance
September 4	12:00 pm	Saint Francis (PA)*	No. 20	Lynchburg City Stadium; Lynchburg, VA	MASN	W 52–7	8,286
September 11	7:00 pm	at Ball State*	No. 18	Scheumann Stadium; Muncie, IN		W 27–23	9,110
September 18	12:00 pm	at Robert Morris*	No. 14	Joe Walton Stadium; Moon Township, PA	WTLU	L 23–30	2,893
September 25	6:00 pm	at No. 3 James Madison*	No. 21	Bridgeforth Stadium; Harrisonburg, VA	WTLU	L 3–10	16,385
October 2	7:00 pm	Savannah State*	No. 25	Williams Stadium; Lynchburg, VA	WTLU	W 52–14	19,314
October 9	3:30 pm	Charleston Southern^{†}	No. 24	Williams Stadium; Lynchburg, VA	WTLU	W 44–20	18,587
October 16	1:30 pm	at VMI	No. 19	Alumni Memorial Field; Lexington, VA	ESPN3	W 41–7	7,157
October 30	1:30 pm	at Presbyterian	No. 12	Bailey Memorial Stadium; Clinton, SC	WTLU	W 34–24	3,140
November 6	3:30 pm	Gardner–Webb	No. 12	Williams Stadium; Lynchburg, VA	ESPN3	W 40–14	16,441
November 13	1:00 pm	at Coastal Carolina	No. 11	Brooks Stadium; Conway, SC (rivalry)	ESPN3	L 31–45	7,764
November 20	3:30 pm	Stony Brook	No. 18	Williams Stadium; Lynchburg, VA	MASN	W 54–28	10,521
*Non-conference game; ^{†}Homecoming; Rankings from The Sports Network Poll released prior to the game; All times are in Eastern time
