= 2010 Central Connecticut State Blue Devils football team =

American college football season

2010 Central Connecticut State Blue Devils football

NEC co-champion
- Conference: Northeast Conference
- Record: 8–3 (7–1 NEC)
- Head coach: Jeff McInerney (5th season)
- Offensive coordinator: Tim Stowers (1st season)
- Co-offensive coordinator: Adam Lechtenberg (1st season)
- Home stadium: Arute Field

2010 Northeast Conference football standings
	Conf.			Overall
Team	W		L	W		L
Robert Morris +^	7	–	1	8	–	3
Central Connecticut State +	7	–	1	8	–	3
Duquesne	5	–	3	7	–	4
Bryant	4	–	4	7	–	4
Albany	4	–	4	6	–	5
Wagner	3	–	5	5	–	6
Monmouth	3	–	5	3	–	8
Sacred Heart	2	–	6	4	–	7
Saint Francis (PA)	1	–	7	1	–	10
+ – Conference co-champions; ^ – FCS playoff participant

The 2010 Central Connecticut State Blue Devils football team represented Central Connecticut State University as a member of the Northeast Conference (NEC) during the 2010 NCAA Division I FCS football season. Led by fifth-year head coach Jeff McInerney, the Blue Devils compiled an overall record of 8–3 with a mark of 7–1 in conference play, winning the NEC along with Robert Morris. The Blue Devils played home games at Arute Field in New Britain, Connecticut.

== Schedule ==
Date	Time	Opponent	Site	TV	Result	Attendance
September 4	12:00 pm	No. 10 New Hampshire*	Cowell Stadium; Durham, NH	UNHTV	L 3–33	7,419
September 11	12:00 pm	Bentley*	Arute Field; New Britain, CT		W 45–14	3,268
September 18	6:00 pm	at Youngstown State*	Stambaugh Stadium; Youngstown, OH		L 24–63	16,386
September 25	12:00 pm	Bryant	Arute Field; New Britain, CT		W 41–24	3,219
October 2	1:00 pm	at Sacred Heart	Campus Field; Fairfield, CT		W 24–14	2,886
October 9	12:00 pm	Duquesne	Arute Field; New Britain, CT		W 31–29	3,957
October 22	7:00 pm	at Albany	University Field; Albany, NY		W 30–27 ^{OT}	2,058
October 30	12:00 pm	Wagner	Arute Field; New Britain, CT		W 38–20	2,684
November 6	12:00 pm	at Robert Morris	Joe Walton Stadium; Moon Township, PA		L 24–42	2,789
November 13	12:00 pm	at Monmouth	Kessler Field; West Long Branch, NJ		W 49–48 ^{2OT}	1,277
November 20	12:00 pm	Saint Francis (PA)	Arute Field; New Britain, CT		W 23–13	2,756
*Non-conference game; Rankings from The Sports Network Poll released prior to the game; All times are in Eastern time
