= 2010 Columbia Lions football team =

American college football season

2010 Columbia Lions football
- Conference: Ivy League
- Record: 4–6 (2–5 Ivy)
- Head coach: Norries Wilson (5th season)
- Offensive coordinator: Vinny Marino (5th season)
- Captains: Alex Gross; Andrew Kennedy; Matt Moretto; Mike Stephens
- Home stadium: Robert K. Kraft Field at Lawrence A. Wien Stadium

2010 Ivy League football standings
	Conf.			Overall
Team	W		L	W		L
No. 18 Penn $	7	–	0	9	–	1
Harvard	5	–	2	7	–	3
Yale	5	–	2	7	–	3
Brown	5	–	2	6	–	4
Dartmouth	3	–	4	6	–	4
Columbia	2	–	5	4	–	6
Cornell	1	–	6	2	–	8
Princeton	0	–	7	1	–	9
$ – Conference champion; Rankings from The Sports Network poll

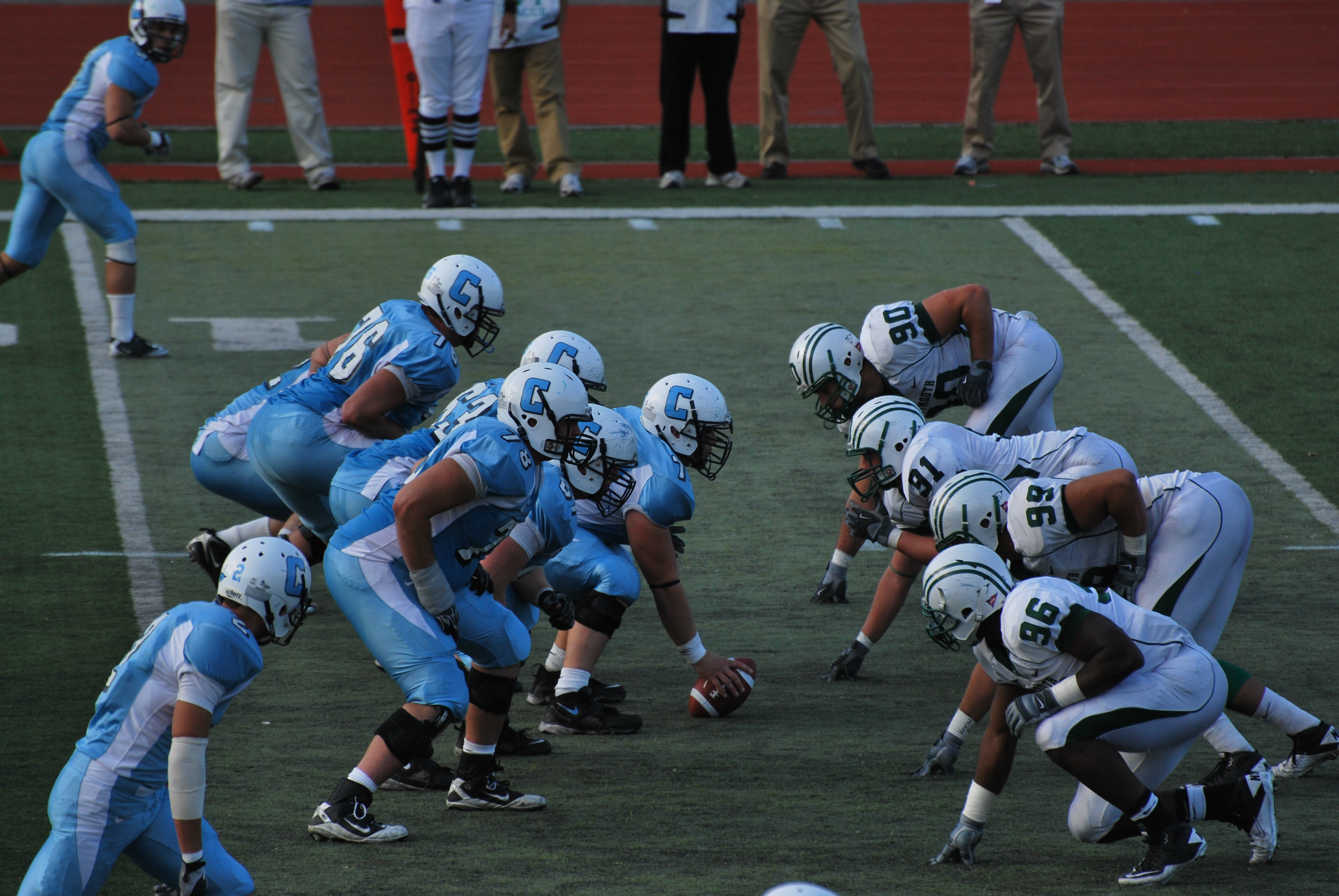
Dartmouth Big Green at Columbia, 23 October 2010

The 2010 Columbia Lions football team was an American football team that represented Columbia University during the 2010 NCAA Division I FCS football season. Columbia finished sixth in the Ivy League. Columbia averaged 5,192 fans per game.

In their fifth season under head coach Norries Wilson, the Lions compiled a 4–6 record and were outscored 228 to 222. Alex Gross, Andrew Kennedy, Matt Moretto and Mike Stephens were the team captains.

The Lions' 2–5 conference record placed sixth in the Ivy League standings. Columbia was outscored 174 to 147 by Ivy opponents.

Columbia played its homes games at Robert K. Kraft Field at Lawrence A. Wien Stadium in Upper Manhattan, in New York City.

== Schedule ==
Date	Opponent	Site	Result	Attendance	Source
September 10	Fordham*	Robert K. Kraft Field at Lawrence A. Wien Stadium; New York, NY (Liberty Cup)	L 9–16	4,454	
September 25	Towson*	Robert K. Kraft Field at Lawrence A. Wien Stadium; New York, NY	W 24–10	2,643	
October 2	Princeton	Robert K. Kraft Field at Lawrence A. Wien Stadium; New York, NY	W 42–14	4,836	
October 9	Lafayette*	Robert K. Kraft Field at Lawrence A. Wien Stadium; New York, NY	W 42–28	2,998	
October 16	at No. 25 Penn	Franklin Field; Philadelphia, PA	L 13–27	10,523	
October 23	Dartmouth^{†}	Robert K. Kraft Field at Lawrence A. Wien Stadium; New York, NY	L 21–24	10,904	
October 30	at Yale	Yale Bowl; New Haven, CT	L 28–31	11,912	
November 6	at Harvard	Harvard Stadium; Boston, MA	L 7–23	7,801	
November 13	Cornell	Robert K. Kraft Field at Lawrence A. Wien Stadium; New York, NY (rivalry)	W 20–17	5,318	
November 20	at Brown	Brown Stadium; Providence, RI	L 16–38		
*Non-conference game; ^{†}Homecoming; Rankings from The Sports Network Poll released prior to the game
