= 2010 Holy Cross Crusaders football team =

American college football season

2010 Holy Cross Crusaders football
- Conference: Patriot League
- Record: 6–5 (3–2 Patriot)
- Head coach: Tom Gilmore (7th season)
- Offensive coordinator: Andy McKenzie (3rd season)
- Defensive coordinator: Richard Rodgers Sr. (5th season)
- Captains: Anthony DiMichele; Sean Lamkin; Freddie Santana
- Home stadium: Fitton Field

2010 Patriot League football standings
	Conf.			Overall
Team	W		L	W		L
No. 14 Lehigh $^	5	–	0	10	–	3
Colgate	3	–	2	7	–	4
Holy Cross	3	–	2	6	–	5
Georgetown	2	–	3	4	–	7
Lafayette	1	–	4	2	–	9
Bucknell	1	–	4	1	–	10
Fordham	0	–	0	5	–	6
$ – Conference champion; ^ – FCS playoff participant; Rankings from The Sports Network poll

The 2010 Holy Cross Crusaders football team was an American football team that represented the College of the Holy Cross during the 2010 NCAA Division I FCS football season. Holy Cross tied for second in the Patriot League.

In their seventh year under head coach Tom Gilmore, the Crusaders compiled a 6–5 record. Anthony DiMichele, Sean Lamkin and Freddie Santana were the team captains.

Despite their winning record, the Crusaders were outscored 254 to 249. Their 3–2 conference record tied with Colgate for second-best in the Patriot League standings. Holy Cross' homecoming win over Fordham did not count in its league record, as Fordham had been disqualified from the championship after admitting scholarship players.

Holy Cross was ranked No. 25 in the preseason national top 25, but dropped out of the rankings after their opening week, and remained unranked for the rest of the year.

Holy Cross played its home games at Fitton Field on the college campus in Worcester, Massachusetts.

== Schedule ==
Date	Opponent	Site	Result	Attendance	Source
September 4	Howard*	Fitton Field; Worcester, MA	W 38–7	6,982	
September 11	at UMass*	McGuirk Stadium; Hadley, MA	L 7–31	16,352	
September 18	at Harvard*	Harvard Stadium; Boston, MA	L 6–34	21,704	
September 25	at Georgetown	Multi-Sport Field; Washington, DC	L 7–17	3,211	
October 2	Fordham^{†}	Fitton Field; Worcester, MA (rivalry)	W 36–31	10,891	
October 9	Brown*	Fitton Field; Worcester, MA	W 17–13	4,973	
October 16	at Dartmouth*	Memorial Field; Hanover, NH	L 19–27	3,318	
October 23	at Colgate	Andy Kerr Stadium; Hamilton, NY	W 31–24	6,213	
November 6	Lehigh	Fitton Field; Worcester, MA	L 17 34	5,892	
November 15	at Lafayette	Fisher Stadium; Easton, PA	W 37–27	4,846	
November 20	Bucknell	Fitton Field; Worcester, MA	W 34–9	4,297	
*Non-conference game; ^{†}Homecoming; ^ Family Weekend
