= 2010 Sacred Heart Pioneers football team =

American college football season

2010 Sacred Heart Pioneers football
- Conference: Northeast Conference
- Record: 4–7 (2–6 NEC)
- Head coach: Paul Gorham (7th season)
- Home stadium: Campus Field

2010 Northeast Conference football standings
	Conf.			Overall
Team	W		L	W		L
Robert Morris +^	7	–	1	8	–	3
Central Connecticut State +	7	–	1	8	–	3
Duquesne	5	–	3	7	–	4
Bryant	4	–	4	7	–	4
Albany	4	–	4	6	–	5
Wagner	3	–	5	5	–	6
Monmouth	3	–	5	3	–	8
Sacred Heart	2	–	6	4	–	7
Saint Francis (PA)	1	–	7	1	–	10
+ – Conference co-champions; ^ – FCS playoff participant

The 2010 Sacred Heart Pioneers football team represented Sacred Heart University as a member of the Northeast Conference (NEC) during the 2010 NCAA Division I FCS football season. Led by seventh-year head coach Paul Gorham, the Pioneers compiled an overall record of 4–7 with a mark of 2–6 in conference play, placing eighth in the NEC. Sacred Heart played home games at Campus Field in Fairfield, Connecticut.

== Schedule ==
Date	Time	Opponent	Site	TV	Result	Attendance	Source
September 3	7:00 p.m.	at Marist*	Tenney Stadium at Leonidoff Field; Poughkeepsie, NY		W 28–25	2,867	
September 11	12:00 p.m.	Robert Morris	Campus Field; Fairfield, CT		L 31–35	2,076	
September 18	12:00 p.m.	at Saint Francis (PA)	DeGol Field; Loretto, PA	FCS	L 0–41	1,608	
September 25	1:30 p.m.	at Dartmouth*	Memorial Field; Hanover, NH		L 19–21	6,427	
October 2	1:00 p.m.	Central Connecticut State^{†}	Campus Field; Fairfield, CT		L 14–24	2,886	
October 9	1:00 p.m.	at Bryant	Bulldog Stadium; Smithfield, RI		L 24–25	3,303	
October 16	12:00 p.m.	at Duquesne	Arthur J. Rooney Athletic Field; Pittsburgh, PA		L 17–37	1,290	
October 23	1:00 p.m.	Georgetown*	Campus Field; Fairfield, CT		W 33–20	3,189	
October 30	1:00 p.m.	at Monmouth	Kessler Field; West Long Branch, NJ		W 26–25	3,354	
November 6	1:00 p.m.	Albany	Campus Field; Fairfield, CT		L 23–35	1,296	
November 20	1:00 p.m.	Wagner	Campus Field; Fairfield, CT		W 38–22	1,567	
*Non-conference game; ^{†}Homecoming; All times are in Eastern time
