= 2010 Robert Morris Colonials football team =

American college football season

2010 Robert Morris Colonials football

NEC co-champion

NCAA Division I First Round, L 24–42 vs. North Dakota State
- Conference: Northeast Conference
- Record: 8–3 (7–1 NEC)
- Head coach: Joe Walton (17th season)
- Defensive coordinator: Scott Farison (3rd season)
- Co-defensive coordinator: Scott Benzel (2nd season)
- Home stadium: Joe Walton Stadium

2010 Northeast Conference football standings
	Conf.			Overall
Team	W		L	W		L
Robert Morris +^	7	–	1	8	–	3
Central Connecticut State +	7	–	1	8	–	3
Duquesne	5	–	3	7	–	4
Bryant	4	–	4	7	–	4
Albany	4	–	4	6	–	5
Wagner	3	–	5	5	–	6
Monmouth	3	–	5	3	–	8
Sacred Heart	2	–	6	4	–	7
Saint Francis (PA)	1	–	7	1	–	10
+ – Conference co-champions; ^ – FCS playoff participant

The 2010 Robert Morris Colonials football team represented Robert Morris University in the 2010 NCAA Division I FCS football season. The Colonials were led by 17th-year head coach Joe Walton and played their home games at Joe Walton Stadium. They are a member of the Northeast Conference.

== Schedule ==
Date	Time	Opponent	Rank	Site	TV	Result	Attendance	Source
September 4	1:00 p.m.	at Dayton*		Welcome Stadium; Dayton, OH		L 14–28	3,377	
September 11	12:00 p.m.	at Sacred Heart		Campus Field; Fairfield, CT		W 35–31	2,076	
September 18	12:00 p.m.	No. 14 Liberty*		Joe Walton Stadium; Moon Township, PA		W 30–23	2,893	
September 25	12:00 p.m.	at Wagner		Wagner College Stadium; Staten Island, NY		W 30–9	2,410	
October 2	1:00 p.m.	at Saint Francis		DeGol Field; Loretto, PA		W 35–14	2,338	
October 9	12:00 p.m.	Monmouth		Joe Walton Stadium; Moon Township, PA		W 17–16	2,104	
October 16	12:00 p.m.	Albany^{†}		Joe Walton Stadium; Moon Township, PA		W 38–0	3,078	
October 30	12:00 p.m.	Duquesne		Joe Walton Stadium; Moon Township, PA	FCS	W 38–0	2,873	
November 6	12:00 p.m.	Central Connecticut State		Joe Walton Stadium; Moon Township, PA		W 42–24	2,789	
November 13	12:00 p.m.	at Bryant	No. 25	Bulldog Stadium; Smithfield, RI		L 24–42	2,207	
November 27	7:00 p.m.	at No. 21 North Dakota State*		Fargodome; Fargo, ND (NCAA Division I First Round)		L 24–42	12,202	
*Non-conference game; ^{†}Homecoming; Rankings from The Sports Network Poll released prior to the game; All times are in Eastern time
