= 2010 Coastal Carolina Chanticleers football team =

American college football season

2010 Coastal Carolina Chanticleers football

Big South co-champion

NCAA Division I First Round, L 10–17 vs. Western Illinois
- Conference: Big South Conference
- Record: 6–6 (5–1 Big South)
- Head coach: David Bennett (8th season)
- Offensive coordinator: Kevin Brown (2nd season)
- Offensive scheme: Multiple
- Defensive coordinator: Curtis Walker (8th season)
- Base defense: 4–3
- Home stadium: Brooks Stadium

2010 Big South Conference football standings
	Conf.			Overall
Team	W		L	W		L
No. 21 Liberty +	5	–	1	8	–	3
Stony Brook +	5	–	1	6	–	5
Coastal Carolina +^	5	–	1	6	–	6
Gardner–Webb	2	–	4	4	–	7
VMI	2	–	4	3	–	8
Charleston Southern	1	–	5	3	–	8
Presbyterian	1	–	5	2	–	9
$ – Conference champion; ^ – FCS playoff participant; Rankings from The Sports Network poll

The 2010 Coastal Carolina Chanticleers football team represented Coastal Carolina University as a member of the Big South Conference during the 2010 NCAA Division I FCS football season. Led by eighth-year head coach David Bennett, the Chanticleers compiled an overall record of 6–6 with a mark of 5–1 in conference play, sharing the Big South title with Liberty and Stony Brook. Coastal Carolina received the Big South's automatic bid to the NCAA Division I Football Championship playoffs, where the Chanticleers lost in the first round to Western Illinois. The team played home games at Brooks Stadium in Conway, South Carolina.

Coastal Carolina played a five-overtime game against Towson on September 11, the longest in program history.

== Schedule ==
Date	Time	Opponent	Site	TV	Result	Attendance	Source
September 4	3:30 pm	at No. 25 (FBS) West Virginia*	Milan Puskar Stadium; Morgantown, WV	ESPN Plus	L 31–0	57,862	
September 11	7:00 pm	at Towson*	Johnny Unitas Stadium; Towson, MD		L 45–47 ^{5OT}	8,990	
September 18	6:00 pm	Georgia Southern*	Brooks Stadium; Conway, SC		L 26–43	8,857	
September 25	6:00 pm	Delaware State*	Brooks Stadium; Conway, SC		W 34–14	9,218	
October 2	1:00 pm	at No. 11 Richmond*	E. Claiborne Robins Stadium; Richmond, VA		L 19–41	8,464	
October 16	2:00 pm	at Presbyterian	Bailey Memorial Stadium; Clinton, SC		W 35–7	4,753	
October 23	7:30 pm	Stony Brook^{†}	Brooks Stadium; Conway, SC	MASN	L 28–38	8,671	
October 30	1:30 pm	at Gardner–Webb	Spangler Stadium; Boiling Springs, NC		W 30–27 ^{OT}	3,750	
November 6	1:30 pm	at VMI	Alumni Memorial Field; Lexington, VA	ESPN3	W 31–3	5,123	
November 13	1:00 pm	No. 11 Liberty	Brooks Stadium; Conway, SC (rivalry)	ESPN3	W 45–31	7,764	
November 20	1:00 pm	Charleston Southern	Brooks Stadium; Conway, SC		W 70–3	7,503	
November 27	1:00 pm	No. 21 Western Illinois*	Brooks Stadium; Conway, SC (NCAA Division I First Round)		L 10–17	4,556	
*Non-conference game; ^{†}Homecoming; Rankings from The Sports Network Poll released prior to the game; All times are in Eastern time
