= 2010 North Greenville Crusaders football team =

American college football season

2010 North Greenville Crusaders football

Victory Bowl, W 42–16 vs. Campbellsville
- Conference: Independent
- Record: 8–3
- Head coach: Jamey Chadwell (2nd season)
- Defensive coordinator: Chad Staggs (2nd season)
- Home stadium: Younts Stadium

2010 NCAA Division II Super Region 2 independents football records
	Conf.			Overall
Team	W		L	W		L
North Greenville		–		8	–	3
UNC Pembroke		–		5	–	5
Lambuth #		–		4	–	6
# – Provisional Division II member; Rankings from AFCA Poll

The 2010 North Greenville Crusaders football team represented North Greenville University as an independent during the 2010 NCAA Division II football season. Led by second-year head coach Jamey Chadwell, the team compiled a record of 8–3. North Greenville was invited to the Victory Bowl, where they beat Campbellsville. The Crusaders offense scored 408 points while the defense allowed 195 points.

== Schedule ==
Date	Time	Opponent	Site	TV	Result	Attendance
August 28		at Mars Hill	Meares Stadium; Mars Hill, NC		L 30–36	3,211
September 4	1:30 pm	at Charleston Southern	Buccaneer Field; Charleston, SC		L 31–41	3,421
September 11		at Edward Waters	Earl S Kitchings Stadium; Jacksonville, FL		W 44-14	450
September 18		Lenoir–Rhyne	Younts Stadium; Tigerville, SC		L 19–20	5,134
September 25	12:00 pm	at Presbyterian	Bailey Memorial Stadium; Clinton, SC	BSN	W 34–17	3,093
October 2		Ohio State–Newark	Younts Stadium; Tigerville, SC		W 63–0	3,375
October 7		Wright State	Younts Stadium; Tigerville, SC		W 62–0	3,276
October 16		at LaGrange	Callaway Stadium; LaGrange, GA		W 55–27	1,100
October 23		Edward Waters^{†}	Younts Stadium; Tigerville, SC		W 42–0	4,210
October 30		at Notre Dame (OH)	Korb Field; South Euclid, OH		W 21–14	663
November 6		at UNC Pembroke	Grace P. Johnson Stadium; Pembroke, NC		W 27–10	1,508
November 20		Campbellsville	Younts Stadium; Tigerville, SC (Victory Bowl)		W 42–16	4,150
^{†}Homecoming; All times are in Eastern time
