= 2010 Saint Francis Red Flash football team =

American college football season

2010 Saint Francis Red Flash football
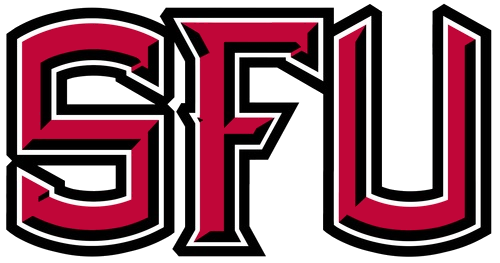
- Conference: Northeast Conference
- Record: 1–10 (1–7 NEC)
- Head coach: Chris Villarrial (1st season)
- Offensive coordinator: Ralph DelSardo (1st season)
- Defensive coordinator: Ralph Clark (1st season)
- Home stadium: DeGol Field

2010 Northeast Conference football standings
	Conf.			Overall
Team	W		L	W		L
Robert Morris +^	7	–	1	8	–	3
Central Connecticut State +	7	–	1	8	–	3
Duquesne	5	–	3	7	–	4
Bryant	4	–	4	7	–	4
Albany	4	–	4	6	–	5
Wagner	3	–	5	5	–	6
Monmouth	3	–	5	3	–	8
Sacred Heart	2	–	6	4	–	7
Saint Francis (PA)	1	–	7	1	–	10
+ – Conference co-champions; ^ – FCS playoff participant

The 2010 Saint Francis Red Flash football team represented Saint Francis University as a member of the Northeast Conference (NEC) during the 2010 NCAA Division I FCS football season. The Red Flash were led by Chris Villarrial in his first year as the program’s 27th head coach and played their home games at DeGol Field. They finished the season 1–10 overall and 1–7 in NEC play to place last.

== Schedule ==
Date	Time	Opponent	Site	TV	Result	Attendance	Source
September 4	12:00 p.m.	at No. 20 Liberty*	Lynchburg City Stadium; Lynchburg, VA	MASN	L 7–52	8,286	
September 11	1:00 p.m.	at Morehead State*	Jayne Stadium; Morehead, KY		L 21–31	5,150	
September 17	12:00 p.m.	Sacred Heart	DeGol Field; Loretto, PA	FCS	W 41–0	1,608	
October 2	1:00 p.m.	Robert Morris	DeGol Field; Loretto, PA		L 14–35	2,338	
October 9	1:00 p.m.	Albany	University Field; Albany, NY		L 20–41	6,624	
October 16	2:00 p.m.	Wagner	DeGol Field; Loretto, PA		L 14–22	1,411	
October 23	1:00 p.m.	at Monmouth	Kessler Field; West Long Branch, NJ		L 7–19	2,209	
October 30	9:05 p.m.	at No. 20 Cal Poly*	Alex G. Spanos Stadium; San Luis Obispo, CA		L 33–41	7,132	
November 6	1:00 p.m.	Bryant^{†}	DeGol Field; Loretto, PA		L 10–48	1,526	
November 13	1:00 p.m.	Duquesne	Arthur J. Rooney Athletic Field; Pittsburgh, PA		L 17–41	1,535	
November 20	12:00 p.m.	at Central Connecticut State	Arute Field; New Britain, CT		L 13–23	2,756	
*Non-conference game; ^{†}Homecoming; Rankings from The Sports Network Poll released prior to the game; All times are in Eastern time
