= 2010 Dartmouth Big Green football team =

American college football season

2010 Dartmouth Big Green football
- Conference: Ivy League
- Record: 6–4 (3–4 Ivy)
- Head coach: Buddy Teevens (11th season)
- Offensive coordinator: Keith Clark (1st season)
- Offensive scheme: Multiple
- Defensive coordinator: Don Dobes (1st season)
- Base defense: 4–3
- Home stadium: Memorial Field

2010 Ivy League football standings
| | Conf. | | | Overall |
| Team | W | | L | W | | L |
|---|---|---|---|---|---|---|
| No. 18 Penn $ | 7 | – | 0 | 9 | – | 1 |
| Harvard | 5 | – | 2 | 7 | – | 3 |
| Yale | 5 | – | 2 | 7 | – | 3 |
| Brown | 5 | – | 2 | 6 | – | 4 |
| Dartmouth | 3 | – | 4 | 6 | – | 4 |
| Columbia | 2 | – | 5 | 4 | – | 6 |
| Cornell | 1 | – | 6 | 2 | – | 8 |
| Princeton | 0 | – | 7 | 1 | – | 9 |
$ – Conference champion; Rankings from The Sports Network poll

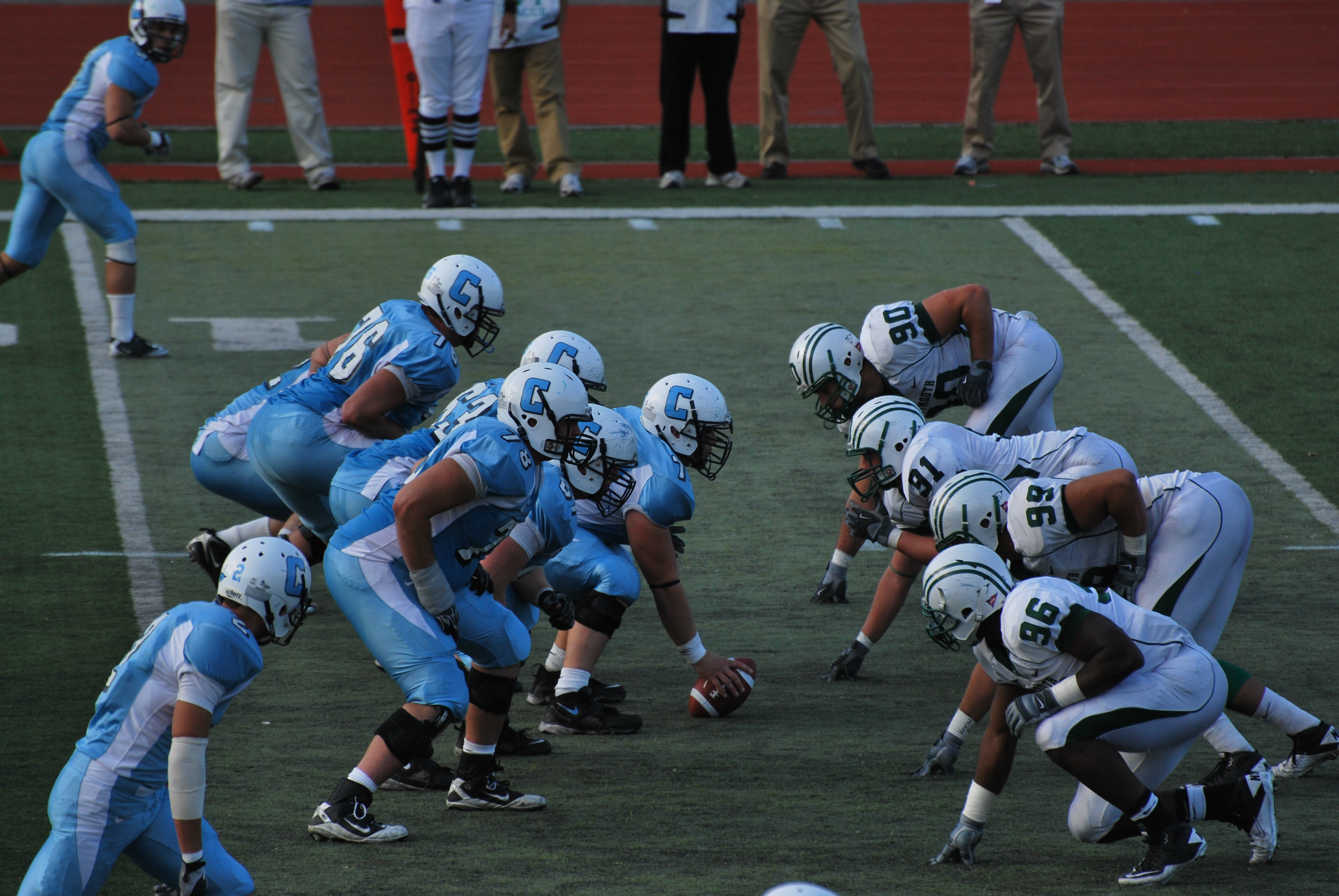
Big Green at Columbia, 23 October 2010

The 2010 Dartmouth Big Green football team represented Dartmouth College in the 2010 NCAA Division I FCS football season. The Big Green were led by head coach Buddy Teevens in his sixth straight year and 11th overall and played their home games at Memorial Field. They are a member of the Ivy League. They finished the season 6–4 overall and 3–4 in Ivy League play, placing fifth. Dartmouth averaged 5,971 fans per game.

== Schedule ==
| Date | Time | Opponent | Site | Result | Attendance | Source |
|---|---|---|---|---|---|---|
| September 18 | 1:00 p.m. | at Bucknell* | Christy Mathewson–Memorial Stadium; Lewisburg, PA | W 43–20 | 6,017 | |
| September 25 | 1:30 p.m. | Sacred Heart* | Memorial Field; Hanover, NH | W 21–19 | 6,427 | |
| October 2 | 3:30 p.m. | at Penn | Franklin Field; Philadelphia, PA | L 28–35 ^{OT} | 10,407 | |
| October 9 | 1:30 p.m. | Yale | Memorial Field; Hanover, NH | L 20–23 | 7,156 | |
| October 16 | 1:30 p.m. | Holy Cross* | Memorial Field; Hanover, NH | W 27–19 | 3,318 | |
| October 23 | 1:30 p.m. | at Columbia | Robert K. Kraft Field at Lawrence A. Wien Stadium; Manhattan, NY | W 24–21 | 10,904 | |
| October 30 | 1:30 p.m. | Harvard^{†} | Memorial Field; Hanover, NH | L 14–30 | 9,142 | |
| November 6 | 12:30 p.m. | at Cornell | Schoellkopf Field; Ithaca, NY | W 28–10 | 3,787 | |
| November 13 | 12:00 p.m. | Brown | Memorial Field; Hanover, NH | L 28–35 | 3,814 | |
| November 20 | 1:00 p.m. | at Princeton | Powers Field at Princeton Stadium; Princeton, NJ | W 31–0 | 6,355 | |
*Non-conference game; ^{†}Homecoming; All times are in Eastern time
