= 2010 Bryant Bulldogs football team =

American college football season

2010 Bryant Bulldogs football
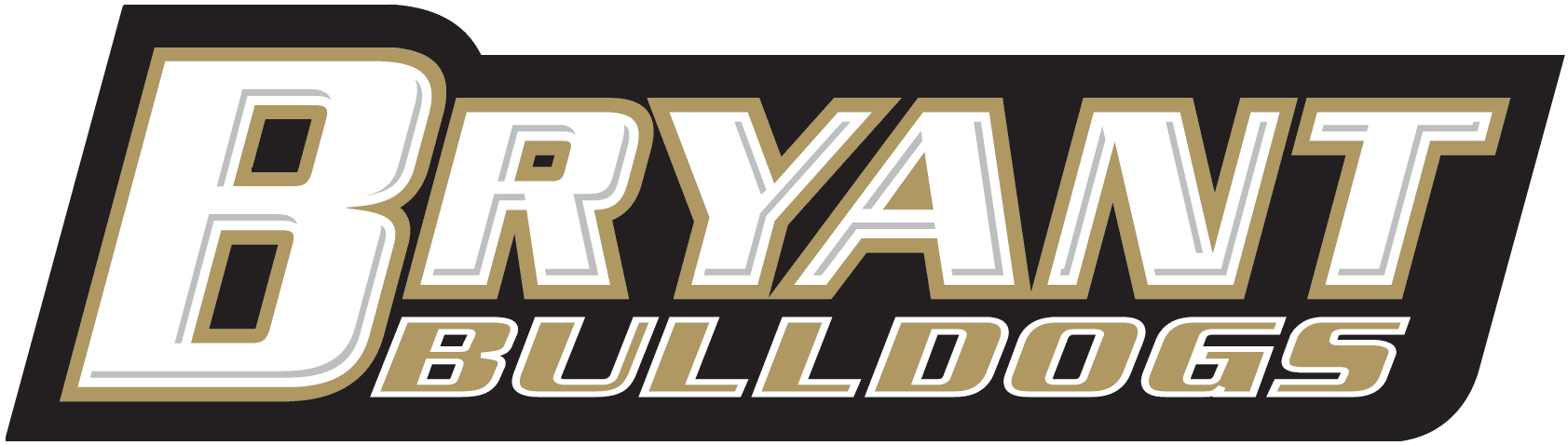
- Conference: Northeast Conference
- Record: 7–4 (4–4 NEC)
- Head coach: Marty Fine (7th season)
- Defensive coordinator: Greg Gigantino (4th season)
- Co-defensive coordinator: Chad Walker (1st season)
- Home stadium: Bulldog Stadium

2010 Northeast Conference football standings
	Conf.			Overall
Team	W		L	W		L
Robert Morris +^	7	–	1	8	–	3
Central Connecticut State +	7	–	1	8	–	3
Duquesne	5	–	3	7	–	4
Bryant	4	–	4	7	–	4
Albany	4	–	4	6	–	5
Wagner	3	–	5	5	–	6
Monmouth	3	–	5	3	–	8
Sacred Heart	2	–	6	4	–	7
Saint Francis (PA)	1	–	7	1	–	10
+ – Conference co-champions; ^ – FCS playoff participant

The 2010 Bryant Bulldogs football team represented Bryant University as a member of the Northeast Conference (NEC) during the 2010 NCAA Division I FCS football season. Led by seventh-year head coach Marty Fine, the Bulldogs compiled an overall record of 7–4 with a mark of 4–4 in conference play, tying for fourth place in the NEC. Bryant played home games at Bulldog Stadium in Smithfield, Rhode Island.

== Schedule ==
Date	Time	Opponent	Site	Result	Attendance
September 4	3:00 p.m.	Fordham*	Bulldog Stadium; Smithfield, RI	W 44–30	5,113
September 11	1:00 p.m.	Saint Anselm*	Bulldog Stadium; Smithfield, RI	W 44–21	1,867
September 18	1:00 p.m.	Merrimack*	Bulldog Stadium; Smithfield, RI	W 46–29	1,356
September 25	12:00 p.m.	Central Connecticut State	Arute Field; New Britain, CT	L 24–41	3,219
October 2	1:00 p.m.	at Wagner	Wagner College Stadium; Staten Island, NY	L 21–29	1,717
October 9	1:00 p.m.	Sacred Heart	Bulldog Stadium; Smithfield, RI	W 25–24	3,303
October 16	1:00 p.m.	at Monmouth	Kessler Field; West Long Branch, NJ	L 12–21	1,507
October 30	1:00 p.m.	Albany	Bulldog Stadium; Smithfield, RI	W 24–7	3,756
November 6	1:00 p.m.	at Saint Francis (PA)	DeGol Field; Loretto, PA	W 48–10	1,526
November 13	12:00 p.m.	No. 25 Robert Morris	Bulldog Stadium; Smithfield, RI	W 27–21	2,207
November 20	12:00 p.m.	Duquesne	Bulldog Stadium; Smithfield, RI	L 29–37	2,500
*Non-conference game; Rankings from Coaches' Poll released prior to the game; All times are in Eastern time
