= 2010 Duquesne Dukes football team =

American college football season

2010 Duquesne Dukes football
- Conference: Northeast Conference
- Record: 7–4 (5–3 NEC)
- Head coach: Jerry Schmitt (6th season)
- Offensive coordinator: Gary Dunn (2nd season)
- Defensive coordinator: Dave Opfar (1st season)
- Home stadium: Arthur J. Rooney Field

2010 Northeast Conference football standings
	Conf.			Overall
Team	W		L	W		L
Robert Morris +^	7	–	1	8	–	3
Central Connecticut State +	7	–	1	8	–	3
Duquesne	5	–	3	7	–	4
Bryant	4	–	4	7	–	4
Albany	4	–	4	6	–	5
Wagner	3	–	5	5	–	6
Monmouth	3	–	5	3	–	8
Sacred Heart	2	–	6	4	–	7
Saint Francis (PA)	1	–	7	1	–	10
+ – Conference co-champions; ^ – FCS playoff participant

The 2010 Duquesne Dukes football team represented Duquesne University as a member of the Northeast Conference (NEC) during the 2010 NCAA Division I FCS football season. The Dukes were led by sixth-year head coach Jerry Schmitt and played their home games at Arthur J. Rooney Athletic Field. They finished the season 7–4 overall and 5–3 in conference play, placing third in the NEC.

== Schedule ==
Date	Time	Opponent	Site	TV	Result	Attendance	Source
September 4	6:00 pm	Bucknell*	Arthur J. Rooney Athletic Field; Pittsburgh, PA		W 17–13	2,240	
September 11	12:00 pm	Dayton*	Arthur J. Rooney Athletic Field; Pittsburgh, PA		W 35–31	1,823	
September 18	6:00 pm	at No. 11 Delaware*	Delaware Stadium; Newark, DE		L 6–30	18,922	
September 25	12:00 pm	Albany	Arthur J. Rooney Athletic Field; Pittsburgh, PA		W 28–17	1,287	
October 2	1:00 pm	Monmouth	Arthur J. Rooney Athletic Field; Pittsburgh, PA		L 17–44	1,831	
October 9	12:00 pm	at Central Connecticut State	Arute Field; New Britain, CT		L 29–31	3,957	
October 16	12:00 pm	Sacred Heart	Arthur J. Rooney Athletic Field; Pittsburgh, PA		W 37–17	1,290	
October 23	1:00 pm	at Wagner	Wagner College Stadium; Staten Island, NY		W 21–20	2,832	
October 30	12:00 pm	at Robert Morris	Joe Walton Stadium; Moon Township, PA	FCS	L 11–34	2,873	
November 13	1:00 pm	Saint Francis (PA)	Arthur J. Rooney Athletic Field; Pittsburgh, PA		W 41–17	1,535	
November 20	12:00 pm	at Bryant	Bulldog Stadium; Smithfield, RI		W 37–29	2,500	
*Non-conference game; Rankings from The Sports Network Poll released prior to the game; All times are in Eastern time
