= 2010 Lenoir–Rhyne Bears football team =

American college football season

2010 Lenoir–Rhyne Bears football
- Conference: South Atlantic Conference
- Record: 7–4 (4–3 SAC)
- Head coach: Fred Goldsmith (4th season)
- Offensive coordinator: Brent Thompson (1st season)
- Defensive coordinator: Mike Houston (4th season)
- Home stadium: Moretz Stadium

2010 South Atlantic Conference football standings
	Conf.			Overall
Team	W		L	W		L
No. 20 Wingate $^	6	–	1	9	–	3
Carson–Newman	5	–	2	7	–	4
Lenoir–Rhyne	4	–	3	7	–	4
Catawba	4	–	3	6	–	4
Mars Hill	3	–	4	5	–	6
Newberry	3	–	4	4	–	6
Tusculum	2	–	5	6	–	5
Brevard	1	–	6	4	–	7
$ – Conference champion; ^ – NCAA Division II playoff participant; Rankings from AFCA poll

The 2010 Lenoir–Rhyne Bears football team represented Lenoir–Rhyne University in the 2010 NCAA Division II football season. The Bears offense scored 358 points while the defense allowed 223 points.

== Schedule ==
Date	Opponent	Site	Result	Attendance
August 28	Chowan*	Moretz Stadium; Hickory, NC	W 59–10	6,389
September 4	Concord*	Moretz Stadium; Hickory, NC	L 17–20	6,298
September 11	Davidson*	Moretz Stadium; Hickory, NC	W 41–13	7,081
September 18	at North Greenville*	Younts Stadium; Tigerville, SC	W 20–19	5,134
October 2	at Newberry	Setzler Field; Newberry, SC	L 36–40	3,012
October 9	Mars Hill^{†}	Moretz Stadium; Hickory, NC	L 20–24	7,247
October 16	at Brevard	Brevard, NC	W 24–8	1,421
October 23	Tusculum	Moretz Stadium; Hickory, NC	W 34–31	2,396
October 30	at Wingate	Irwin Belk Stadium; Wingate, NC	L 24–27	3,913
November 6	at Carson–Newman	Burke-Tarr Stadium; Jefferson City, TN	W 52–14	3,864
November 13	Catawba	Moretz Stadium; Hickory, NC	W 31–17	6,646
*Non-conference game; ^{†}Homecoming
