= 2010 Stony Brook Seawolves football team =

American college football season

2010 Stony Brook Seawolves football

Big South co-champion
- Conference: Big South Conference
- Record: 6–5 (5–1 Big South)
- Head coach: Chuck Priore (5th season)
- Offensive coordinator: Jeff Behrman (5th season)
- Defensive coordinator: Jim Gush (2nd season)
- Home stadium: Kenneth P. LaValle Stadium

2010 Big South Conference football standings
| | Conf. | | | Overall |
| Team | W | | L | W | | L |
|---|---|---|---|---|---|---|
| No. 21 Liberty + | 5 | – | 1 | 8 | – | 3 |
| Stony Brook + | 5 | – | 1 | 6 | – | 5 |
| Coastal Carolina +^ | 5 | – | 1 | 6 | – | 6 |
| Gardner–Webb | 2 | – | 4 | 4 | – | 7 |
| VMI | 2 | – | 4 | 3 | – | 8 |
| Charleston Southern | 1 | – | 5 | 3 | – | 8 |
| Presbyterian | 1 | – | 5 | 2 | – | 9 |
$ – Conference champion; ^ – FCS playoff participant; Rankings from The Sports Network poll

The 2010 Stony Brook Seawolves football team represented Stony Brook University as a member of the Big South Conference during the 2010 NCAA Division I FCS football season. The team was led by fifth-year head coach Chuck Priore and played it home games at Kenneth P. LaValle Stadium at Stony Brook, New York. The Seawolves compiled an overall record of 6–5 with a mark of 5–1 in conference place, sharing the Big South title with Liberty and Coastal Carolina. It was Stony Brook's second consecutive Big South title. Due to the three-way tie atop the conference standings, the Big South's automatic bid to the NCAA Division I Football Championship playoffs was given to Coastal Carolina, not Stony Brook, who allowed more points against the Big South opponents.

== Schedule ==
| Date | Time | Opponent | Site | TV | Result | Attendance |
|---|---|---|---|---|---|---|
| September 4 | 7:00 pm | at South Florida* | Raymond James Stadium; Tampa, FL | SNY/Big South Net | L 14–59 | 40,201 |
| September 11 | 6:00 pm | American International* | Kenneth P. LaValle Stadium; Stony Brook, NY | Big South Net | W 31–14 | 4,291 |
| September 18 | 12:30 pm | at Brown* | Brown Stadium; Providence, RI | Big South Net | L 33–30 ^{2OT} | 3,988 |
| September 25 | 6:00 pm | No.11 UMass* | Kenneth P. LaValle Stadium; Stony Brook, NY | Big South Net | L 21–26 | 5,309 |
| October 9 | 6:00 pm | VMI^{†} | Kenneth P. LaValle Stadium; Stony Brook, NY | Big South Net | W 27–9 | 7,432 |
| October 16 | 1:00 pm | at Lafayette* | Fisher Stadium; Easton, PA | MASN/Big South Net | L 21–28 | 6,036 |
| October 23 | 7:30 pm | at Coastal Carolina | Brooks Stadium; Conway, SC | MASN/Big South Net | W 38–28 | 8,671 |
| October 30 | 3:00 pm | Charleston Southern | Kenneth P. LaValle Stadium; Stony Brook, NY | Big South Net | W 41–21 | 4,007 |
| November 6 | 1:00 pm | at Presbyterian | Bailey Memorial Stadium; Clinton, SC | SportSouth/Big South Net | W 37–7 | 1,667 |
| November 13 | 1:00 pm | Gardner–Webb | Kenneth P. LaValle Stadium; Stony Brook, NY | Big South Net | W 55–3 | 3,502 |
| November 20 | 3:30 pm | at No. 21 Liberty | Williams Stadium; Lynchburg, VA | MASN/Big South Net | L 28–54 | 10,521 |
*Non-conference game; ^{†}Homecoming; All times are in Eastern time

== Before the season ==
=== Recruitment ===
In the off-season Hofstra University, Stony Brook's Long Island rivals, announced that it would cut its football team for future season after 2009 leaving the Seawolves as the sole college football team in the long island area. As NCAA rules state, when a college team is cut, football athletes that transfer to another school don't need to meet residency requirements to start play. This led to five incoming transfer from Hofstra to begin play at Stony Brook including Miguel Mayonet, and Brock Jackolski for the 2010 season.

== Roster ==
2010 Stony Brook Seawolves Roster
| **Quarterbacks**: 17 Ryan Andersen, Fr; 10 Michael Coulter, Jr; 15 Kyle Essington, So; 13 Nick Moody, Fr; 16 Victor Spinelli, RS Fr; **Tailbacks**: 23 Edwin Gowins, Jr; 30 Brock Jackolski, Jr; 32 Davon Lawrence, Fr; 5 Miguel Maysonet, So; 28 Vincent Polo, RS Fr; **Fullbacks**: 38 Gary Beddoe, RS Fr; 40 Aswand Cruikshank, So; 83 Shane Scorzelli, Fr; **Wide receivers**: 8 Matt Brevi, Jr; 7 Myles Campbell, RS Fr; 89 Kevin Famulari, So; 25 Jordan Gush, So; 12 Cameron Hall, Jr; 82 Michael Lepore, Sr; 80 Bryant McAdoo, Fr; 81 Chris McMillan, RS Fr; 18 Major Mobley, RS Fr; 6 Donald Porter, Sr; 87 Christian Ricard, Fr; **Tight ends**: 84 Brett Arce, So; 11 Chris Fenelon, So; 85 Tanner Nehls, Fr; 88 David Shukri, So | **Offensive linemen**: 76 Matt Acey, Fr; 69 Michael Bamiro, RS Fr; 65 Brian Crew, Sr; 70 Mario Dattilo, Jr; 63 Joe Faiella, Jr; 75 Paul Fenaroli, Sr; 78 Alex Gecewicz, Fr; 67 Scott Hernandez, RS Fr; 74 Eric Mauler, So; 52 Armand Poole, Sr; 71 Cody Precht, Fr; 77 Ian Soiomon, RS Fr; 79 Phillip Vounazos, Jr; **Defensive linemen**: 98 Janna Chukumerije, RS Fr; 92 Jonathan Coats, Jr; 97 Frank Conti, Sr; 96 Ryan Haber, Jr; 66 Kevin Hauter, Fr; 90 Roosevelt Kirk, Jr; 93 Joseph Kirkpatrick, Sr; 51 Michael Marino, Jr; 94 Elias Martinez, RS Fr; 99 Andrew Nelson, Jr; 95 Alex Probasco, RS Fr; 91 John Zorbas, So | **Linebackers**: 56 Casey Callahan, RS Fr; 44 Jawara Dudley, Fr; 46 Matt Faiella, RS Fr; 33 Reginald Fracklin, RS Fr; 3 Julian Glenn, Sr; 57 Nick Iorio, Fr; 48 Grant Nakwaasah, Fr; 58 Nick Netta, So; 55 Adam Nowak, RS Fr; 35 Craig Richardson, So; 34 Stephen Schwicke, Sr; 49 Andres Trujillo, Fr; 45 Kenny Tuiloma, So; **Defensive backs**: 39 Davonte Anderson, Fr; 22 Sheldon Armstrong, So; 19 Sean Burgwardt, Jr; 31 Peace Edafe, RS Fr; 1 Al-Majid Hutchins, Jr; 36 Taj Johnson, RS Fr; 43 Mike Mancini, Fr; 41 Cedrick Moore, Jr; 24 Dominick Reyes, So; 26 Corey Stringer, Jr; 47 Marlon Tudor, Jr; 42 A.J. Valentine, RS Fr; 20 Rich Vitale, So; 21 Arin West, Sr; 4 Jevahn Cruz, Fr; 29 Devante Wheeler, Fr; **Kickers**: 53 Luke Allen **K**, Fr; 27 Drew Evangelista **K**, So; 59 Reza Zoroufie **K**, RS Fr; 50 Josh Gibson **K/P**, Jr; 54 Wesley Skiffington **K/P**, So | **Coaching staff**: Chuck Priore, Head Coach; Jeff Behrman, Offensive Coordinator/Quarterbacks; Rob Neviaser, Defensive Coordinator; Carlton Goff, Wide Receivers; Mark Murray, Offensive Line; Tony Thompson, Defensive Line; Jon Woods, Offensive Line; Patrick Hatch, Defensive Line Assistant; Tyler Santucci, Linebackers; Michael Derice, Director of Football Operations; Classes Key: Fr – Freshman; first year player. So – Sophomore; second year player. Jr – Junior; third year player. Sr – Senior; fourth year player. **Bold** – Team captain. Italics – Left team during the season. RS – Previously used a redshirt. – Redshirt during 2010 season. – Injured for entire or majority of season and is eligible for a medical redshirt. Roster |
