= 2010 Monmouth Hawks football team =

American college football season

2010 Monmouth Hawks football
- Conference: Northeast Conference
- Record: 3–8 (3–5 NEC)
- Head coach: Kevin Callahan (18th season)
- Offensive coordinator: Scott Van Zile (3rd season)
- Offensive scheme: Multiple
- Defensive coordinator: Andy Bobik (17th season)
- Base defense: 4–3
- Home stadium: Kessler Field

2010 Northeast Conference football standings
	Conf.			Overall
Team	W		L	W		L
Robert Morris +^	7	–	1	8	–	3
Central Connecticut State +	7	–	1	8	–	3
Duquesne	5	–	3	7	–	4
Bryant	4	–	4	7	–	4
Albany	4	–	4	6	–	5
Wagner	3	–	5	5	–	6
Monmouth	3	–	5	3	–	8
Sacred Heart	2	–	6	4	–	7
Saint Francis (PA)	1	–	7	1	–	10
+ – Conference co-champions; ^ – FCS playoff participant

The 2010 Monmouth Hawks football team represented Monmouth University in the 2010 NCAA Division I FCS football season as a member of the Northeast Conference (NEC). The Hawks were led by 18th-year head coach Kevin Callahan and played their home games at Kessler Field. They finished the season 3–8 overall and 3–5 in NEC play to tie for fourth place.

== Schedule ==
Date	Time	Opponent	Site	Result	Attendance
September 4	6:00 p.m.	at No. 22 Colgate*	Andy Kerr Stadium; Hamilton, NY	L 29–30	7,260
September 11	1:00 p.m.	Maine*	Kessler Field; West Long Branch, NJ	L 23–31	3,830
September 25	1:00 p.m.	Old Dominion*	Kessler Field; West Long Branch, NJ	L 21–35	1,580
October 2	1:00 p.m.	at Duquesne	Rooney Field; Pittsburgh, PA	W 44–17	1,831
October 9	12:00 p.m.	at Robert Morris	Joe Walton Stadium; Moon Township, PA	L 16–17	2,104
October 16	12:00 p.m.	Bryant	Kessler Field; West Long Branch, NJ	W 21–12	1,507
October 23	1:00 p.m.	Saint Francis (PA)	Kessler Field; West Long Branch, NJ	W 19–7	2,209
October 30	1:00 p.m.	Sacred Heart	Kessler Field; West Long Branch, NJ	L 25–26	3,354
November 6	1:00 p.m.	at Wagner	Wagner College Stadium; Staten Island, NY	L 20–31	1,138
November 13	12:00 p.m.	Central Connecticut State	Kessler Field; West Long Branch, NJ	L 48–49 ^{2OT}	1,277
November 20	1:00 p.m.	at Albany	University Field; Albany, NY	L 19–28	1,780
*Non-conference game; Rankings from The Sports Network Poll released prior to the game; All times are in Eastern time
