= 2010 Murray State Racers football team =

American college football season

2010 Murray State Racers football
- Conference: Ohio Valley Conference
- Record: 6–5 (5–3 OVC)
- Head coach: Chris Hatcher (1st season)
- Offensive coordinator: Buster Faulkner (1st season)
- Offensive scheme: Air raid
- Defensive coordinator: Ashley Anders (1st season)
- Base defense: 4–3
- Home stadium: Roy Stewart Stadium

2010 Ohio Valley Conference football standings
	Conf.			Overall
Team	W		L	W		L
No. 13 Southeast Missouri State $^	7	–	1	9	–	3
No. 12 Jacksonville State ^	6	–	2	9	–	3
Eastern Kentucky	5	–	2	6	–	5
Murray State	5	–	3	6	–	5
UT Martin	5	–	3	6	–	5
Tennessee Tech	4	–	4	5	–	6
Eastern Illinois	2	–	6	2	–	9
Austin Peay	1	–	7	2	–	9
Tennessee State	0	–	7	3	–	8
$ – Conference champion; ^ – FCS playoff participant; Rankings from The Sports Network poll

The 2010 Murray State Racers football team represented Murray State University in the 2010 NCAA Division I FCS football season. The Racers were led by first year head coach Chris Hatcher and played their home games at Roy Stewart Stadium. They are a member of the Ohio Valley Conference. They finished the season 6–5, 5–3 in OVC play to finish in fourth place. Average home attendance for the 2010 season was 5,989.

== Schedule ==
Date	Time	Opponent	Site	TV	Result	Attendance	Source
September 2	7:00 pm	at Kent State*	Dix Stadium; Kent, OH		L 10–41	16,535	
September 11	6:07 pm	Southeast Missouri State	Roy Stewart Stadium; Murray, KY	Wazoo Sports Network	L 17–30	7,014	
September 18	6:00 pm	at Central Arkansas*	Estes Stadium; Conway, AR	Racer TV Network	L 20–21	12,088	
September 25	6:07 pm	UT Martin	Roy Stewart Stadium; Murray, KY	Wazoo Sports Network/ESPN GamePlan	W 52–16	8,107	
October 2	6:00 pm	at No. 4 Jacksonville State	JSU Stadium; Jacksonville, AL		L 34–40	14,812	
October 9	3:00 pm	Missouri State*^{†}	Roy Stewart Stadium; Murray, KY	Racer TV Network	W 72–59	7,806	
October 23	1:30 pm	at Eastern Illinois	O'Brien Stadium; Charleston, IL		W 38–28	6,111	
October 30	2:00 pm	at Eastern Kentucky	Roy Kidd Stadium; Richmond, KY	Wazoo Sports Network/ESPN3	L 21–28	11,600	
November 6	1:00 pm	Tennessee Tech	Roy Stewart Stadium; Murray, KY		W 44–13	4,114	
November 13	1:00 pm	at Austin Peay	Governors Stadium; Clarksville, TN		W 61–35	3,103	
November 20	1:00 pm	Tennessee State	Roy Stewart Stadium; Murray, KY		W 28–23	2,904	
*Non-conference game; ^{†}Homecoming; Rankings from The Sports Network Poll released prior to the game; All times are in Central time
