= 2010 Eastern Kentucky Colonels football team =

American college football season

2010 Eastern Kentucky Colonels football
- Conference: Ohio Valley Conference
- Record: 6–5 (5–2 OVC)
- Head coach: Dean Hood (3rd season)
- Offensive coordinator: Mike Springston (3rd season)
- Home stadium: Roy Kidd Stadium (Capacity: 20,000)

2010 Ohio Valley Conference football standings
	Conf.			Overall
Team	W		L	W		L
No. 13 Southeast Missouri State $^	7	–	1	9	–	3
No. 12 Jacksonville State ^	6	–	2	9	–	3
Eastern Kentucky	5	–	2	6	–	5
Murray State	5	–	3	6	–	5
UT Martin	5	–	3	6	–	5
Tennessee Tech	4	–	4	5	–	6
Eastern Illinois	2	–	6	2	–	9
Austin Peay	1	–	7	2	–	9
Tennessee State	0	–	7	3	–	8
$ – Conference champion; ^ – FCS playoff participant; Rankings from The Sports Network poll

The 2010 Eastern Kentucky Colonels football team represented Eastern Kentucky University in the 2010 NCAA Division I FCS football season. The team was led by Dean Hood, who was in his third season as head coach. The season was the Colonels' 101st. Eastern Kentucky played their home games at Roy Kidd Stadium in Richmond, Kentucky.

== Schedule ==
Date	Time	Opponent	Site	TV	Result	Attendance	Source
September 2	7:00 pm	at Missouri State*	Robert W. Plaster Sports Complex; Springfield, MO		L 9–31	7,391	
September 11	3:30 pm	at Louisville*	Papa John's Cardinal Stadium; Louisville, KY	WHAS	L 13–23	51,427	
September 18	6:00 pm	at Chattanooga*	Finley Stadium; Chattanooga, TN		L 24–42	10,543	
October 2	7:00 pm	Kentucky State*	Roy Kidd Stadium; Richmond, KY		W 58–7	7,400	
October 9	7:00 pm	Eastern Illinois	Roy Kidd Stadium; Richmond, KY	WSN	W 35–7	5,100	
October 16	3:00 pm	at UT Martin	Graham Stadium; Martin, TN		L 7–10	5,330	
October 23	2:00 pm	at Southeast Missouri State	Houck Stadium; Cape Girardeau, MO		L 21–40	6,022	
October 30	3:00 pm	Murray State^{†}	Roy Kidd Stadium; Richmond, KY	WSN	W 28–21	11,600	
November 6	7:00 pm	No. 2 Jacksonville State	Roy Kidd Stadium; Richmond, KY	WSN	W 49–37	3,300	
November 13	2:30 pm	at Tennessee Tech	Tucker Stadium; Cookeville, TN		W 42–29	10,216	
November 20	1:00 pm	Austin Peay	Roy Kidd Stadium; Richmond, KY		W 17–3	3,700	
*Non-conference game; ^{†}Homecoming; Rankings from The Sports Network Poll released prior to the game; All times are in Eastern time

== Coaching staff ==
Name	Position	Alma mater	Year
Dean Hood	Head coach	Ohio Wesleyan, 1986	3rd
Mike Springston	Offensive coordinator/QBs coach	West Virginia Tech, 1981	3rd
Dane Damron	Special teams coordinator/tight ends coach	Georgetown College, 1994	2nd
Garry Fisher	Linebackers coach	Bowling Green, 2002	2nd
Tony Hatmaker	Defensive backs coach	Union College (KY), 1993	3rd
Ben Hodges	Wide receivers coach	Central College, 2006	5th
Carson Jeffers	Offensive line coach	Concord College, 1997	3rd
Jake Johnson	Defensive line coach	Eastern Kentucky, 2002	7th
John Revere	Running backs coach	Eastern Kentucky, 1976	14th
