= 2010 Austin Peay Governors football team =

American college football season

2010 Austin Peay Governors football
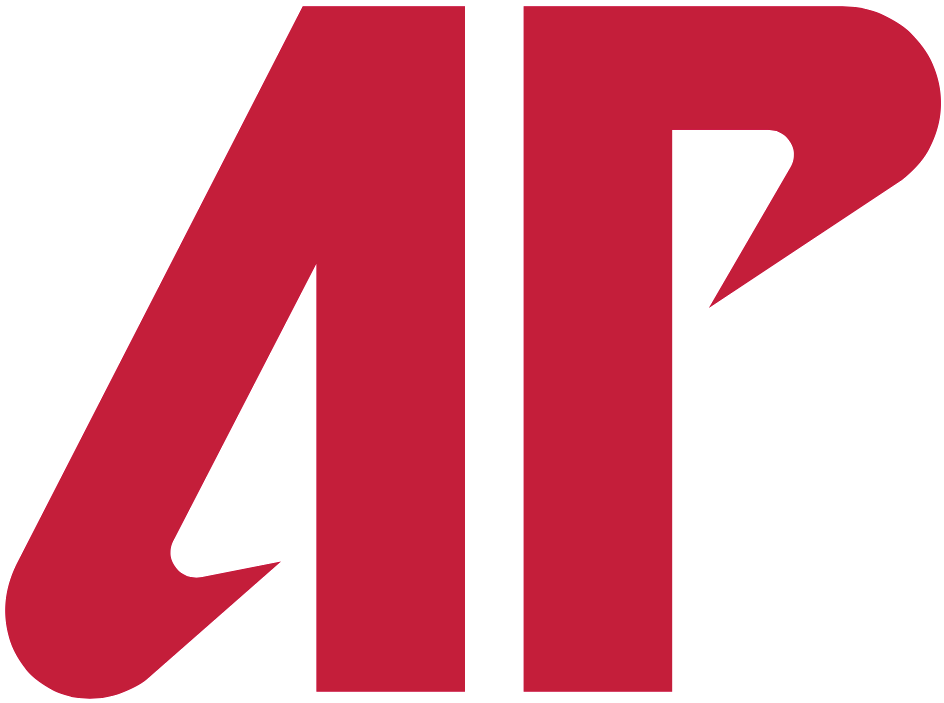
- Conference: Ohio Valley Conference
- Record: 2–9 (1–7 OVC)
- Head coach: Rick Christophel (4th season)
- Defensive coordinator: Granville Eastman (6th season)
- Home stadium: Governors Stadium

2010 Ohio Valley Conference football standings
	Conf.			Overall
Team	W		L	W		L
No. 13 Southeast Missouri State $^	7	–	1	9	–	3
No. 12 Jacksonville State ^	6	–	2	9	–	3
Eastern Kentucky	5	–	2	6	–	5
Murray State	5	–	3	6	–	5
UT Martin	5	–	3	6	–	5
Tennessee Tech	4	–	4	5	–	6
Eastern Illinois	2	–	6	2	–	9
Austin Peay	1	–	7	2	–	9
Tennessee State	0	–	7	3	–	8
$ – Conference champion; ^ – FCS playoff participant; Rankings from The Sports Network poll

The 2010 Austin Peay Governors football team represented Austin Peay State University as a member of the Ohio Valley Conference (OVC) during the 2010 NCAA Division I FCS football season. The Governors were led by fourth-year head coach Rick Christophel and played their home games at Governors Stadium. They finished the season with an overall record of 2–9 and a mark of 1–7 in conference play, placing eighth in the OVC.

== Schedule ==
Date	Time	Opponent	Site	TV	Result	Attendance
September 2	6:00 pm	Cumberland*	Governors Stadium; Clarksville, TN		W 38–6	4,710
September 11	6:00 pm	at Middle Tennessee*	Floyd Stadium; Murfreesboro, TN		L 33–56	16,806
September 18	6:00 pm	at Tennessee State	LP Field; Nashville, TN (Sgt. York Trophy)	Wazoo	W 26–23	8,502
October 25	11:00 pm	at No. 10 (FBS) Wisconsin	Camp Randall; Madison, WI	Big Ten Network	L 3–70	77,224
October 9	4:00 pm	Tennessee Tech^{†}	Governors Stadium; Clarksville, TN (Sgt. York Trophy)		L 21–34	7,218
October 16	6:00 pm	No. 18 Southeast Missouri State	Governors Stadium; Clarksville, TN	WQWQ	L 24–41	2,917
October 23	3:00 pm	at No. 3 Jacksonville State	Burgess-Snow Field; Jacksonville, AL	WJXS	L 3–56	19,707
October 30	1:30 pm	at Eastern Illinois	O'Brien Stadium; Charleston, IL	WEIU	L 10–28	4,385
November 6	1:00 pm	UT Martin	Governors Stadium; Clarksville, TN (Sgt. York Trophy)		L 12–28	4,307
November 13	1:00 pm	Murray State	Governors Stadium; Clarksville, TN		L 35–61	3,103
November 20	1:00 pm	at Eastern Kentucky	Roy Kidd Stadium; Richmond, KY		L 3–17	3,700
*Non-conference game; ^{†}Homecoming; Rankings from The Sports Network Poll released prior to the game; All times are in Central time

== Coaching staff ==
Name	Position	Alma mater	Year
Rick Christophel	Head coach	Austin Peay, 1975	4th
Steve Haywood	Assistant head coach/offensive line	Austin Peay, 1996	2nd as Assistant HC/9th as coach
Granville Eastman	Defensive coordinator/linebackers coach	Saint Mary’s, 1992	8th total/6th as defensive coordinator/2nd as linebackers coach
Marcus Gildersleeve	Receivers coach/recruiting coordinator	Virginia Tech, 1999	5th
Josh Roberts	Running backs coach	Lambuth, 2006	5th
Dainon Sidney	Defensive backs coach	UAB, 1997	2nd
Ryan Taylor	Defensive line coach	Austin Peay, 2004	3rd total/2nd as linebackers coach
