= 2010 Eastern Illinois Panthers football team =

American college football season

2010 Eastern Illinois Panthers football
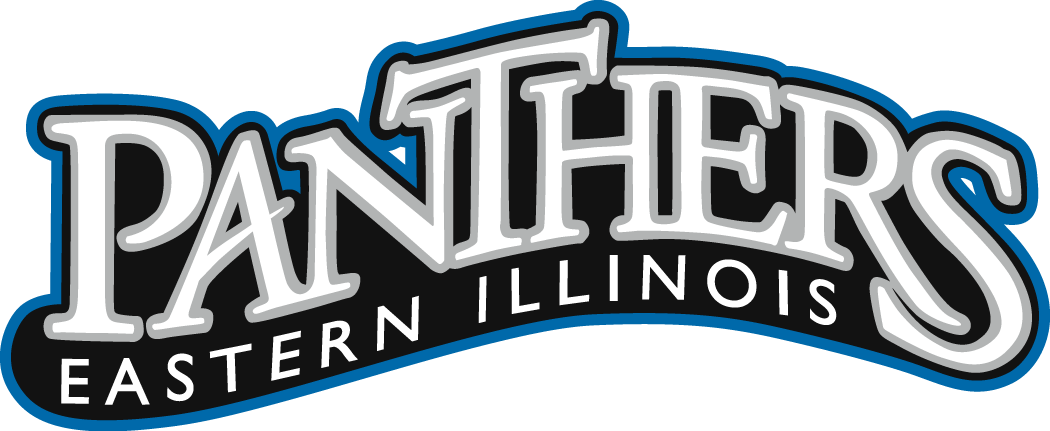
- Conference: Ohio Valley Conference
- Record: 2–9 (2–6 OVC)
- Head coach: Bob Spoo (23rd season)
- Offensive coordinator: Roy Wittke (16th season)
- Defensive coordinator: Roc Bellantoni (9th season)
- Home stadium: O'Brien Field

2010 Ohio Valley Conference football standings
	Conf.			Overall
Team	W		L	W		L
No. 13 Southeast Missouri State $^	7	–	1	9	–	3
No. 12 Jacksonville State ^	6	–	2	9	–	3
Eastern Kentucky	5	–	2	6	–	5
Murray State	5	–	3	6	–	5
UT Martin	5	–	3	6	–	5
Tennessee Tech	4	–	4	5	–	6
Eastern Illinois	2	–	6	2	–	9
Austin Peay	1	–	7	2	–	9
Tennessee State	0	–	7	3	–	8
$ – Conference champion; ^ – FCS playoff participant; Rankings from The Sports Network poll

The 2010 Eastern Illinois Panthers football team represented Eastern Illinois University as a member of the Ohio Valley Conference (OVC) during the 2010 NCAA Division I FCS football season. Led by 23rd-year head coach Bob Spoo, the Panthers compiled an overall record of 2–9 with a mark of 2–6 in conference play, placing seventh in the OVC. Eastern Illinois played home games at O'Brien Field in Charleston, Illinois.

== Schedule ==
Date	Time	Opponent	Site	TV	Result	Attendance
September 4	11:00 am	at No. 9 Iowa*	Kinnick Stadium; Iowa City, IA	BTN	L 7–37	70,585
September 11	1:30 pm	Central Arkansas*	O'Brien Field; Charleston, IL	WEIU	L 7–37	5,529
September 18	6:00 pm	at UT Martin	Graham Stadium; Martin, TN		L 10–20	4,791
September 25	1:30 pm	No. 4 Jacksonville State	O’Brien Field; Charleston, IL	WEIU	L 23–28	4,311
October 2	1:30 pm	Southeast Missouri State	O’Brien Field; Charleston, IL	Wazoo	L 13–28	8,007
October 9	6:00 pm	at Eastern Kentucky	Roy Kidd Stadium; Richmond, KY	Wazoo	L 7–35	5,100
October 16	7:00 pm	at Tennessee Tech	Tucker Stadium; Cookeville, TN	WCTE	L 20–34	4,420
October 23	1:30 pm	Murray State^{†}	O'Brien Field; Charleston, IL	WEIU	L 28–38	6,111
October 30	1:30 pm	Austin Peay	O’Brien Field; Charleston, IL	WEIU	W 28–10	4,485
November 6	5:00 pm	at Tennessee State	LP Field; Nashville, TN		W 31–28 ^{OT}	21,596
November 13	1:00 pm	at Illinois State*	Hancock Stadium; Normal, IL (rivalry)		L 23–27	4,566
*Non-conference game; ^{†}Homecoming; Rankings from The Sports Network Poll released prior to the game; All times are in Central time
