= 2010 Tennessee State Tigers football team =

American college football season

2010 Tennessee State Tigers football
- Conference: Ohio Valley Conference
- Record: 3–8 (0–7 OVC)
- Head coach: Rod Reed (1st season)
- Offensive coordinator: Mike Jones (1st season)
- Home stadium: LP Field

2010 Ohio Valley Conference football standings
	Conf.			Overall
Team	W		L	W		L
No. 13 Southeast Missouri State $^	7	–	1	9	–	3
No. 12 Jacksonville State ^	6	–	2	9	–	3
Eastern Kentucky	5	–	2	6	–	5
Murray State	5	–	3	6	–	5
UT Martin	5	–	3	6	–	5
Tennessee Tech	4	–	4	5	–	6
Eastern Illinois	2	–	6	2	–	9
Austin Peay	1	–	7	2	–	9
Tennessee State	0	–	7	3	–	8
$ – Conference champion; ^ – FCS playoff participant; Rankings from The Sports Network poll

The 2010 Tennessee State Tigers football team represented Tennessee State University as a member of the a member of the Ohio Valley Conference (OVC) in the 2010 NCAA Division I FCS football season. The Tigers were led by first-year head coach Rod Reed and played their home games at LP Field. They finished the season 3–8 overall and 0–7 in OVC play to finish in last place.

== Schedule ==
Date	Time	Opponent	Site	TV	Result	Attendance	Source
September 4	6:00 pm	Alabama A&M*	LP Field; Nashville, TN (John Merritt Classic)		W 27–14	22,607	
September 11	6:00 pm	vs. Jackson State*	Liberty Bowl Memorial Stadium; Memphis, TN (Southern Heritage Classic)		L 26–33	44,688	
September 18	6:00 pm	Austin Peay	LP Field; Nashville, TN (Sgt. York Trophy)	Wazoo	L 23–26	8,502	
September 25	2:45 pm	vs. Florida A&M*	Georgia Dome; Atlanta, GA (Atlanta Football Classic)	NBCSN	W 29–18	54,202	
October 2	4:00 pm	vs. North Carolina A&T*	Lucas Oil Stadium; Indianapolis, IN (Circle City Classic)		W 37–7	35,217	
October 9	6:00 pm	at No. 25 Southeast Missouri State	Houck Stadium; Cape Girardeau, MO	KFVS	L 17–19	10,316	
October 16	3:00 pm	at No. 3 Jacksonville State	Burgess–Snow Field at JSU Stadium; Jacksonville, AL	WJXS	L 0–24	15,218	
October 23	6:00 pm	Tennessee Tech	LP Field; Nashville, TN (Sgt. York Trophy)		L 10–21	6,739	
November 6	5:00 pm	Eastern Illinois	LP Field; Nashville, TN		L 28–31 ^{OT}	21,596	
November 13	6:00 pm	at UT Martin	Graham Stadium; Martin, TN (Sgt. York Trophy)		L 0–37	3,141	
November 20	1:00 pm	at Murray State	Roy Stewart Stadium; Murray, KY		L 23–28	2,904	
*Non-conference game; Rankings from The Sports Network Poll released prior to the game; All times are in Central time
