= 2010 Appalachian State Mountaineers football team =

American college football season

2010 Appalachian State Mountaineers football

SoCon co-champion

NCAA Division I Quarterfinal, L 24–42 vs. Villanova
- Conference: Southern Conference

Ranking
- Sports Network: No. 4
- FCS Coaches: No. 4
- Record: 10–3 (7–1 Southern)
- Head coach: Jerry Moore (22nd season)
- Offensive coordinator: Collaborative
- Offensive scheme: Multiple spread
- Defensive coordinator: Dale Jones (1st season)
- Base defense: 3–4
- Home stadium: Kidd Brewer Stadium

2010 Southern Conference football standings
| | Conf. | | | Overall |
| Team | W | | L | W | | L |
|---|---|---|---|---|---|---|
| No. 4 Appalachian State +^ | 7 | – | 1 | 10 | – | 3 |
| No. 6 Wofford +^ | 7 | – | 1 | 10 | – | 3 |
| No. 5 Georgia Southern ^ | 5 | – | 3 | 10 | – | 5 |
| Chattanooga | 5 | – | 3 | 6 | – | 5 |
| Elon | 5 | – | 3 | 6 | – | 5 |
| Furman | 3 | – | 5 | 5 | – | 6 |
| Samford | 2 | – | 6 | 4 | – | 7 |
| The Citadel | 1 | – | 7 | 3 | – | 8 |
| Western Carolina | 1 | – | 7 | 2 | – | 9 |
+ – Conference co-champions; ^ – FCS playoff participant; Rankings from The Sports Network poll

The 2010 Appalachian State Mountaineers football team represented Appalachian State University in the 2010 NCAA Division I FCS football season. The team was led by head coach Jerry Moore in his 22nd season and played their home games at Kidd Brewer Stadium. They were members of the Southern Conference.

== Schedule ==
| Date | Time | Opponent | Rank | Site | TV | Result | Attendance |
|---|---|---|---|---|---|---|---|
| September 4 | 3:00 p.m. | at Chattanooga | No. 3 | Finley Stadium; Chattanooga, TN | SportSouth | W 42–41 | 15,235 |
| September 11 | 3:30 p.m. | Jacksonville* | No. 3 | Kidd Brewer Stadium; Boone, NC | | W 45–14 | 28,708 |
| September 18 | 3:30 p.m. | North Carolina Central* | No. 2 | Kidd Brewer Stadium; Boone, NC | | W 44–16 | 29,218 |
| September 25 | 3:00 p.m. | at Samford | No. 2 | Seibert Stadium; Homewood, AL | | W 35–17 | 9,428 |
| October 9 | 3:00 p.m. | No. 19 Elon^{†} | No. 1 | Kidd Brewer Stadium; Boone, NC | SportSouth | W 34–31 | 31,531 |
| October 16 | 6:00 p.m. | The Citadel | No. 1 | Kidd Brewer Stadium; Boone, NC | | W 39–10 | 29,519 |
| October 23 | 3:00 p.m. | at Western Carolina | No. 1 | E. J. Whitmire Stadium; Cullowhee, NC (Battle for the Old Mountain Jug) | SportSouth | W 37–14 | 14,004 |
| October 30 | 3:30 p.m. | Furman | No. 1 | Kidd Brewer Stadium; Boone, NC (Black Saturday) | | W 37–26 | 29,093 |
| November 6 | 2:00 p.m. | at Georgia Southern | No. 1 | Paulson Stadium; Statesboro, GA (rivalry) | | L 14–21 ^{OT} | 20,073 |
| November 13 | 3:00 p.m. | No. 4 Wofford | No. 3 | Kidd Brewer Stadium; Boone, NC | SportSouth | W 43–13 | 28,622 |
| November 20 | 12:30 p.m. | at Florida* | No. 2 | Ben Hill Griffin Stadium; Gainesville, FL | ESPN3 | L 10–48 | 90,119 |
| December 4 | 12:00 p.m. | No. 21 Western Illinois* | No. 2 | Kidd Brewer Stadium; Boone, NC (NCAA Division I Second Round) | MASN | W 42–14 | 13,322 |
| December 11 | 12:00 p.m. | No. 10 Villanova* | No. 2 | Kidd Brewer Stadium; Boone, NC (NCAA Division I Quarterfinal) | ESPN | L 24–42 | 15,706 |
*Non-conference game; ^{†}Homecoming; Rankings from The Sports Network Poll released prior to the game; All times are in Eastern time

== Game summaries ==
=== Chattanooga ===
| | 1 | 2 | 3 | 4 | Total |
|---|---|---|---|---|---|
| Appalachian State | 7 | 0 | 7 | 28 | 42 |
| Chattanooga | 16 | 12 | 0 | 13 | 41 |

=== Jacksonville ===
| | 1 | 2 | 3 | 4 | Total |
|---|---|---|---|---|---|
| Jacksonville | 0 | 7 | 7 | 0 | 14 |
| Appalachian State | 10 | 7 | 14 | 14 | 45 |

=== North Carolina Central ===
| | 1 | 2 | 3 | 4 | Total |
|---|---|---|---|---|---|
| North Carolina Central | 0 | 7 | 6 | 3 | 16 |
| Appalachian State | 17 | 10 | 14 | 3 | 44 |

=== Samford ===
| | 1 | 2 | 3 | 4 | Total |
|---|---|---|---|---|---|
| Appalachian State | 7 | 21 | 7 | 0 | 35 |
| Samford | 0 | 10 | 0 | 7 | 17 |

=== Elon ===
| | 1 | 2 | 3 | 4 | Total |
|---|---|---|---|---|---|
| Elon | 7 | 10 | 7 | 7 | 31 |
| Appalachian State | 7 | 13 | 7 | 7 | 34 |

=== The Citadel ===
| | 1 | 2 | 3 | 4 | Total |
|---|---|---|---|---|---|
| The Citadel | 7 | 0 | 3 | 0 | 10 |
| Appalachian State | 13 | 16 | 10 | 0 | 39 |

=== Western Carolina ===
| | 1 | 2 | 3 | 4 | Total |
|---|---|---|---|---|---|
| Appalachian State | 20 | 7 | 7 | 3 | 37 |
| Western Carolina | 0 | 7 | 7 | 0 | 14 |

=== Furman ===
| | 1 | 2 | 3 | 4 | Total |
|---|---|---|---|---|---|
| Furman | 0 | 6 | 14 | 6 | 26 |
| Appalachian State | 7 | 7 | 14 | 9 | 37 |

=== Georgia Southern ===
| | 1 | 2 | 3 | 4 | OT | Total |
|---|---|---|---|---|---|---|
| Appalachian State | 14 | 0 | 0 | 0 | 0 | 14 |
| Georgia Southern | 0 | 7 | 7 | 0 | 7 | 21 |

=== Wofford ===
| | 1 | 2 | 3 | 4 | Total |
|---|---|---|---|---|---|
| Wofford | 0 | 0 | 7 | 6 | 13 |
| Appalachian State | 7 | 17 | 14 | 5 | 43 |

=== Florida ===
| | 1 | 2 | 3 | 4 | Total |
|---|---|---|---|---|---|
| Appalachian State | 0 | 0 | 3 | 7 | 10 |
| Florida | 21 | 7 | 14 | 6 | 48 |

=== Western Illinois ===
| | 1 | 2 | 3 | 4 | Total |
|---|---|---|---|---|---|
| Western Illinois | 7 | 0 | 7 | 0 | 14 |
| Appalachian State | 7 | 21 | 7 | 7 | 42 |

=== Villanova ===
| | 1 | 2 | 3 | 4 | Total |
|---|---|---|---|---|---|
| Villanova | 14 | 14 | 0 | 14 | 42 |
| Appalachian State | 10 | 0 | 7 | 7 | 24 |

== Rankings ==
Ranking movements Legend: ██ Increase in ranking ██ Decrease in ranking
| | Week | | | | | | | | | | | | | |
| Poll | Pre | 1 | 2 | 3 | 4 | 5 | 6 | 7 | 8 | 9 | 10 | 11 | 12 | Final |
|---|---|---|---|---|---|---|---|---|---|---|---|---|---|---|
| The Sports Network | 3 | 3 | 2 | 2 | 2 | 1 | 1 | 1 | 1 | 1 | 3 | 2 | 2 | 4 |
| FCS Coaches | 3 | 3 | 1 | 1 | 1 | 1 | 1 | 1 | 1 | 1 | 3 | 2 | 3 | 4 |
