= Dennis Wagner (American football) =

American football player and coach (born 1958)

Biographical details
- Born: March 9, 1958 (age 68); Waverly, Iowa, U.S.

Playing career

Football
- 1976: Drake
- 1977: Ellsworth
- 1978–1979: Utah
- Positions: Center, guard

Coaching career (HC unless noted)

Football
- 1980: Luther (OL)
- 1981–1982: UNLV (TE/OT)
- 1983: William Penn (OL)
- 1984: UNLV (DL/AS&C)
- 1985–1988: St. Cloud State (OC/S&C)
- 1989–1996: Wayne State (NE)
- 1997–2003: Fresno State (AHC/OL)
- 2004–2007: Nebraska (OL)
- 2008–2011: Western Carolina
- 2012–2016: Liberty (assoc. HC / OL)
- 2017–2020: Briar Cliff

Track and field
- 1983: William Penn

Head coaching record
- Overall: 63–95–1 (football)

Dennis Wagner (born March 9, 1958) is an American football coach. He was the head football coach at Briar Cliff University from 2017 to 2020. Wagner served as the head football at Wayne State College in Wayne, Nebraska from 1989 to 1996 and at Western Carolina University from 2008 to 2011. He took over as the twelfth head coach of the Western Carolina Catamounts football program on December 31, 2007 and resigned on November 13, 2011.

== Playing career ==
Wagner begin his collegiate playing days in 1976 at Drake University, then transferred to Ellsworth Community College in Iowa Falls, Iowa, where he became a JUCO All-American and team captain. Wagner completed his playing career at the University of Utah, and was selected team captain his senior season. He earned All-Western Athletic Conference (WAC) honors and an honorable-mention All-America honor as an offensive guard.

== Head coaching record ==
=== Football ===
| Year | Team | Overall | Conference | Standing | Bowl/playoffs |
|---|---|---|---|---|---|
Wayne State Wildcats (Central States Intercollegiate Conference) (1989)
| 1989 | Wayne State | 4–7 | 0–3 | 4th | |
Wayne State Wildcats (NCAA Division II independent) (1990–1996)
| 1990 | Wayne State | 7–4 | | | |
| 1991 | Wayne State | 3–7 | | | |
| 1992 | Wayne State | 5–4–1 | | | |
| 1993 | Wayne State | 9–1 | | | |
| 1994 | Wayne State | 7–3 | | | |
| 1995 | Wayne State | 6–4 | | | |
| 1996 | Wayne State | 3–7 | | | |
| Wayne State: | | 44–37–1 | 0–3 | | |
Western Carolina Catamounts (Southern Conference) (2008–2011)
| 2008 | Western Carolina | 3–9 | 1–7 | 8th | |
| 2009 | Western Carolina | 2–9 | 1–7 | 9th | |
| 2010 | Western Carolina | 2–9 | 1–7 | T–8th | |
| 2011 | Western Carolina | 1–9 | 0–8 | 9th | |
| Western Carolina: | | 8–36 | 3–29 | | |
Briar Cliff Chargers (Great Plains Athletic Conference) (2017–2020)
| 2017 | Briar Cliff | 0–11 | 0–8 | 9th | |
| 2018 | Briar Cliff | 6–5 | 4–5 | 6th | |
| 2019 | Briar Cliff | 5–6 | 4–5 | T–5th | |
| 2020–21 | Briar Cliff | 1–8 | 1–8 | 10th | |
| Briar Cliff: | | 12–30 | 9–26 | | |
| Total: | | 64–103–1 | | | |
