= 2010 Western Illinois Leathernecks football team =

American college football season

2010 Western Illinois Leathernecks football

NCAA Division I Second Round, L 14–42 at Appalachian State
- Conference: Missouri Valley Football Conference

Ranking
- Sports Network: No. 17
- FCS Coaches: No. 20
- Record: 8–5 (5–3 MVFC)
- Head coach: Mark Hendrickson (3rd season)
- Offensive coordinator: Doug Ruse (1st season)
- Defensive coordinator: Thomas Casey (6th season)
- Home stadium: Hanson Field

2010 Missouri Valley Football Conference standings
	Conf.			Overall
Team	W		L	W		L
No. 19 Northern Iowa $^	6	–	2	7	–	5
No. 17 Western Illinois ^	5	–	3	8	–	5
No. 9 North Dakota State ^	4	–	4	9	–	5
Indiana State	4	–	4	6	–	5
Illinois State	4	–	4	6	–	5
South Dakota State	4	–	4	5	–	6
Missouri State	4	–	4	5	–	6
Southern Illinois	4	–	4	5	–	6
Youngstown State	1	–	7	3	–	8
$ – Conference champion; ^ – FCS playoff participant; Rankings from The Sports Network poll

The 2010 Western Illinois Leathernecks football team represented Western Illinois University as a member of the Missouri Valley Football Conference (MFVC) during the 2010 NCAA Division I FCS football season. Led by third-year head coach Mark Hendrickson, the Leathernecks compiled an overall record of 8–5 overall with mark of 5–3 in conference play, placing second in the MVFC. Western Illinois received an at-large bid to the NCAA Division I Football Championship playoffs, where the Leathernecks defeated Coastal Carolina in the first round before losing to Appalachian State in the second round. The team played home games at Hanson Field in Macomb, Illinois.

== Schedule ==
Date	Opponent	Rank	Site	Result	Attendance	Source
September 2	Valparaiso*		Hanson Field; Macomb, IL	W 45–0		
September 11	at Purdue*		Ross–Ade Stadium; West Lafayette, IN	L 21–31	47,301	
September 18	Sam Houston State*		Hanson Field; Macomb, IL	W 56–14	10,965	
September 25	Indiana State^{†}		Hanson Field; Macomb, IL	W 40–7	16,368	
October 2	at No. 13 North Dakota State		Fargodome; Fargo, ND	W 28–16	18,701	
October 9	at South Dakota State	No. 20	Coughlin–Alumni Stadium; Brookings, SD	L 29–33	11,353	
October 16	Youngstown State		Hanson Field; Macomb, IL	W 40–38	13,404	
October 23	at Missouri State	No. 21	Plaster Sports Complex; Springfield, MO	L 28–31		
October 30	Illinois State		Hanson Field; Macomb, IL	W 65–38		
November 13	at Southern Illinois	No. 23	Saluki Stadium; Carbondale, IL	L 10–20	6,245	
November 20	Northern Iowa		Hanson Field; Macomb, IL	W 30–14	8,217	
November 27	at Coastal Carolina	No. 21	Brooks Stadium; Conway, SC (NCAA Division I First Round)	W 17–10	4,556	
December 4	at No. 2 Appalachian State	No. 21	Kidd Brewer Stadium; Boone, NC (NCAA Division I Second Round)	L 14–42	13,322	
*Non-conference game; ^{†}Homecoming; Rankings from The Sports Network Poll released prior to the game
