= 2010 Jacksonville State Gamecocks football team =

American college football season

2010 Jacksonville State Gamecocks football

NCAA DivisionSecond Round, L 14–17 vs. Wofford
- Conference: Ohio Valley Conference

Ranking
- Sports Network: No. 12
- Record: 9–3 (6–2 OVC)
- Head coach: Jack Crowe (11th season)
- Offensive coordinator: Ronnie Letson (7th season)
- Defensive coordinator: Greg Stewart (11th season)
- Home stadium: Burgess–Snow Field at JSU Stadium

2010 Ohio Valley Conference football standings
	Conf.			Overall
Team	W		L	W		L
No. 13 Southeast Missouri State $^	7	–	1	9	–	3
No. 12 Jacksonville State ^	6	–	2	9	–	3
Eastern Kentucky	5	–	2	6	–	5
Murray State	5	–	3	6	–	5
UT Martin	5	–	3	6	–	5
Tennessee Tech	4	–	4	5	–	6
Eastern Illinois	2	–	6	2	–	9
Austin Peay	1	–	7	2	–	9
Tennessee State	0	–	7	3	–	8
$ – Conference champion; ^ – FCS playoff participant; Rankings from The Sports Network poll

The 2010 Jacksonville State Gamecocks football team represented Jacksonville State University as a member of the Ohio Valley Conference (OVC) during the 2010 NCAA Division I FCS football season. Led by 11th-year head coach Jack Crowe, the Gamecocks compiled an overall record of 9–3 with a mark of 6–2 in conference play, placing second in the OVC. Jacksonville played home games at Burgess–Snow Field at JSU Stadium in Jacksonville, Alabama.

In the season opener at Ole Miss, Jacksonville State stunned its NCAA Division I Football Bowl Subdivision (FBS) opponent with a double-overtime upset, 49–48. In the second overtime period, the Gamecocks matched Ole Miss with a touchdown and Crowe ordered his team to attempt a two-point conversion to end the game. Quarterback Coty Blanchard connected with running back Calvin Middleton on a shovel pass in the end zone for the win. Crowe, who had been fired as Arkansas head coach after losing to Division I-AA The Citadel in 1992, said, "If you stay in this long enough, it goes both ways."

Jacksonville State entered the regular season finale against underdogs Tennessee Tech ranked fourth in the nation, with a share of the OVC championship on the line. The Gamecocks mounted a 21-play, 94-yard scoring drive that left 11:33 remaining to play and gave them a 24–7 lead. Tennessee Tech, however, successfully mounted four rapid-fire touchdown drives to win, 35–24, and denied Jacksonville State a share of the conference title and an automatic berth to the NCAA Division I Football Championship playoffs. The Gamecocks did receive an at-large berth to the playoff, and after a first-round bye, lost in the second round of to Wofford, 17–14.

== Schedule ==
Date	Time	Opponent	Rank	Site	TV	Result	Attendance
September 4	2:30 p.m.	at Ole Miss*	No. 17	Vaught–Hemingway Stadium; Oxford, MS	CSS	W 49–48 ^{2OT}	55,768
September 11	6:00 p.m.	Chattanooga*	No. 6	Burgess–Snow Field at JSU Stadium; Jacksonville, AL	WJXS	W 21–17	22,186
September 18	12:00 p.m.	at Georgia State*	No. 4	Georgia Dome; Atlanta, GA	CSS	W 34–27	16,128
September 25	1:30 p.m.	at Eastern Illinois	No. 4	O'Brien Stadium; Charleston, IL		W 28–23	4,311
October 2	6:00 p.m.	at Murray State	No. 4	Burgess–Snow Field at JSU Stadium; Jacksonville, AL	WJXS	W 40–34	14,812
October 9	1:00 p.m.	at UT Martin	No. 3	Graham Stadium; Martin, TN	WJXS	W 30–20	3,913
October 16	3:00 p.m.	Tennessee State	No. 3	Burgess–Snow Field at JSU Stadium; Jacksonville, AL	WJXS	W 24–0	15,218
October 23	3:00 p.m.	Austin Peay	No. 3	Burgess–Snow Field at JSU Stadium; Jacksonville, AL	WJXS	W 56–3	19,707
November 6	6:00 p.m.	at Eastern Kentucky	No. 2	Roy Kidd Stadium; Richmond, KY	WJXS	L 37–49	3,300
November 13	3:00 p.m.	No. 8 Southeast Missouri State	No. 6	Burgess–Snow Field at JSU Stadium; Jacksonville, AL	WJXS	W 29–27	20,237
November 20	4:00 p.m.	at Tennessee Tech	No. 4	Tucker Stadium; Cookeville, TN	ESPN3	L 24–35	4,576
December 4	11:00 a.m.	No. 7 Wofford*	No. 8	Burgess–Snow Field at JSU Stadium; Jacksonville, AL (NCAA Division I Second Round)	ESPN3	L 14–17	11,817
*Non-conference game; Rankings from The Sports Network Poll released prior to the game; All times are in Central time
