= 2010 UT Martin Skyhawks football team =

American college football season

2010 UT Martin Skyhawks football
- Conference: Ohio Valley Conference
- Record: 6–5 (5–3 OVC)
- Head coach: Jason Simpson (5th season)
- Offensive coordinator: Mac Bryan (1st season)
- Defensive coordinator: Chris Boone (5th season)
- Home stadium: Graham Stadium

2010 Ohio Valley Conference football standings
	Conf.			Overall
Team	W		L	W		L
No. 13 Southeast Missouri State $^	7	–	1	9	–	3
No. 12 Jacksonville State ^	6	–	2	9	–	3
Eastern Kentucky	5	–	2	6	–	5
Murray State	5	–	3	6	–	5
UT Martin	5	–	3	6	–	5
Tennessee Tech	4	–	4	5	–	6
Eastern Illinois	2	–	6	2	–	9
Austin Peay	1	–	7	2	–	9
Tennessee State	0	–	7	3	–	8
$ – Conference champion; ^ – FCS playoff participant; Rankings from The Sports Network poll

The 2010 UT Martin Skyhawks football team represented the University of Tennessee at Martin as a member of the Ohio Valley Conference (OVC) during the 2010 NCAA Division I FCS football season. Led by fifth-year head coach Jason Simpson, the Skyhawks compiled an overall record of 6–5 with a mark of 5–3 in conference play, tying for fourth place in the OVC. UT Martin played home games at Graham Stadium in Martin, Tennessee.

== Schedule ==
Date	Time	Opponent	Site	TV	Result	Attendance
September 4	5:00 p.m.	at Tennessee*	Neyland Stadium; Knoxville, TN	PPV	L 0–50	99,123
September 11	6:00 p.m.	at Southeastern Louisiana*	Strawberry Stadium; Hammond, LA		L 10–24	5,320
September 18	6:00 p.m.	Eastern Illinois	Graham Stadium; Martin, TN		W 20–10	4,791
September 25	6:00 p.m.	at Murray State	Roy Stewart Stadium; Murray, KY		L 16–52	8,107
September 30	7:00 p.m.	at Tennessee Tech	Tucker Stadium; Cookeville, TN (Sgt. York Trophy)		W 27–24	7,869
October 9	1:00 p.m.	No. 3 Jacksonville State	Graham Stadium; Martin, TN		L 20–30	3,913
October 16	2:00 p.m.	Eastern Kentucky	Graham Stadium; Martin, TN		W 10–7	5,330
October 21	6:00 p.m.	Lambuth*	Graham Stadium; Martin, TN		W 52–21	4,328
October 30	1:00 p.m.	at No. 11 Southeast Missouri	Houck Stadium; Cape Girardeau, MO		L 17–24	11,126
November 6	1:00 p.m.	at Austin Peay	Governors Stadium; Clarksville, TN (Sgt. York Trophy)		W 28–12	4,307
November 13	6:00 p.m.	Tennessee State	Graham Stadium; Martin, TN (Sgt. York Trophy)		W 37–0	3,141
*Non-conference game; Rankings from The Sports Network Poll released prior to the game; All times are in Central time
