= 2010 Illinois State Redbirds football team =

American college football season

2010 Illinois State Redbirds football
- Conference: Missouri Valley Football Conference
- Record: 6–5 (4–4 MVFC)
- Head coach: Brock Spack (2nd season)
- Offensive coordinator: Luke Huard (1st season)
- Defensive coordinator: Phil Elmassian (2nd season)
- MVPs: Marvon Sanders; Eric Brunner
- Captains: Dane Zumbahlen; Kelvyn Hemphill
- Home stadium: Hancock Stadium

2010 Missouri Valley Football Conference standings
	Conf.			Overall
Team	W		L	W		L
No. 19 Northern Iowa $^	6	–	2	7	–	5
No. 17 Western Illinois ^	5	–	3	8	–	5
No. 9 North Dakota State ^	4	–	4	9	–	5
Indiana State	4	–	4	6	–	5
Illinois State	4	–	4	6	–	5
South Dakota State	4	–	4	5	–	6
Missouri State	4	–	4	5	–	6
Southern Illinois	4	–	4	5	–	6
Youngstown State	1	–	7	3	–	8
$ – Conference champion; ^ – FCS playoff participant; Rankings from The Sports Network poll

The 2010 Illinois State Redbirds football team represented Illinois State University as a member of the Missouri Valley Football Conference (MVFC) during the 2010 NCAA Division I FCS football season. Led by second-year head coach Brock Spack, the Redbirds compiled an overall record of 6–5 with a mark of 4–4 in conference play, placing in a six-way tie for third in the MVFC. Illinois State played home games at Hancock Stadium in Normal, Illinois.

== Schedule ==
Date	Time	Opponent	Rank	Site	Result	Attendance	Source
September 2	6:30 p.m.	Central Missouri*		Hancock Stadium; Normal, IL	W 55–54		
September 11	11:00 a.m.	at Northwestern*		Ryan Field; Evanston, IL	L 3–37	25,471	
September 18	6:00 p.m.	at No. 20 South Dakota State		Dana J. Dykhouse Stadium; Brookings, SD	W 24–14	12,425	
September 25	6:00 p.m.	Missouri State	No. 23	Hancock Stadium; Normal, IL	W 44–41 ^{2OT}	5,417	
October 2	1:00 p.m.	No. 23 Southern Illinois		Hancock Stadium; Normal, IL	L 17–38	7,514	
October 9	2:05 p.m.	at Indiana State		Memorial Stadium; Terre Haute, IN	L 24–59	8,294	
October 16	2:00 p.m.	No. 15 North Dakota State^{†}		Hancock Stadium; Normal, IL	W 34–24	10,131	
October 23	4:05 p.m.	at No. 19 Northern Iowa		UNI-Dome; Cedar Falls, IA	L 14–42	15,730	
October 30	2:00 p.m.	at Western Illinois		Hanson Field; Macomb, IL	L 38–65		
November 6	1:00 p.m.	Youngstown State		Hancock Stadium; Normal, IL	W 41–39	10,076	
November 13	1:00 p.m.	Eastern Illinois*		O'Brien Stadium; Charleston, IL (Mid-America Classic)	W 27–23	4,566	
*Non-conference game; ^{†}Homecoming; Rankings from The Sports Network Poll released prior to the game; All times are in Central time
