= 2010 Chattanooga Mocs football team =

American college football season

2010 Chattanooga Mocs football
- Conference: Southern Conference
- Record: 6–5 (5–3 SoCon)
- Head coach: Russ Huesman (2nd season)
- Co-offensive coordinators: Carmen Felus (5th season); Marcus Satterfield (2nd season)
- Defensive coordinator: Adam Fuller (2nd season)
- Home stadium: Finley Stadium

2010 Southern Conference football standings
	Conf.			Overall
Team	W		L	W		L
No. 4 Appalachian State +^	7	–	1	10	–	3
No. 6 Wofford +^	7	–	1	10	–	3
No. 5 Georgia Southern ^	5	–	3	10	–	5
Chattanooga	5	–	3	6	–	5
Elon	5	–	3	6	–	5
Furman	3	–	5	5	–	6
Samford	2	–	6	4	–	7
The Citadel	1	–	7	3	–	8
Western Carolina	1	–	7	2	–	9
+ – Conference co-champions; ^ – FCS playoff participant; Rankings from The Sports Network Poll

The 2010 Chattanooga Mocs football team represented the University of Tennessee at Chattanooga as a member of the Southern Conference (SoCon) in the 2010 NCAA Division I FCS football season. The Mocs were led by second-year head coach Russ Huesman and played their home games at Finley Stadium. They finished the season 6–5 overall and 5–3 in SoCon play to tie for third place.

== Schedule ==
Date	Time	Opponent	Rank	Site	TV	Result	Attendance
September 4	3:00 pm	No. 3 Appalachian State		Finley Stadium; Chattanooga, TN		L 41–42	15,235
September 11	8:25 pm	at Jacksonville State*		JSU Stadium; Jacksonville, AL		L 17–21	22,186
September 18	6:00 pm	Eastern Kentucky*		Finley Stadium; Chattanooga, TN		W 42–24	10,543
September 25	6:00 pm	at Western Carolina		E. J. Whitmire Stadium; Cullowhee, NC		W 27–21	10,187
October 9	2:00 pm	at The Citadel		Johnson Hagood Stadium; Charleston, SC		W 28–10	13,044
October 16	6:00 pm	No. 21 Georgia Southern^{†}		Finley Stadium; Chattanooga, TN	ESPN3	W 35–27	17,414
October 23	2:00 pm	at No. 25 Furman	No. 24	Paladin Stadium; Greenville, SC		W 36–28	10,394
October 30	2:00 pm	Elon	No. 20	Finley Stadium; Chattanooga, TN	ESPN3	L 35–49	11,095
November 6	1:00 pm	at No. 3 (FBS) Auburn*		Jordan–Hare Stadium; Auburn, AL		L 24–62	87,451
November 13	2:00 pm	Samford		Finley Stadium; Chattanooga, TN		W 48–14	9,207
November 20	3:00 pm	at No. 9 Wofford		Gibbs Stadium; Spartanburg, SC		L 14–28	7,355
*Non-conference game; ^{†}Homecoming; Rankings from The Sports Network Poll released prior to the game; All times are in Eastern time
