= 2010 Georgia Southern Eagles football team =

American college football season

2010 Georgia Southern Eagles football

FCS Playoffs Semifinals, L 7–35 at Delaware
- Conference: Southern Conference

Ranking
- Sports Network: No. 5
- FCS Coaches: No. 6
- Record: 10–5 (5–3 SoCon)
- Head coach: Jeff Monken (1st season)
- Offensive coordinator: Brent Davis (1st season)
- Offensive scheme: Triple option
- Defensive coordinator: Brent Pry (1st season)
- Base defense: 4–3
- Home stadium: Paulson Stadium

2010 Southern Conference football standings
	Conf.			Overall
Team	W		L	W		L
No. 4 Appalachian State +^	7	–	1	10	–	3
No. 6 Wofford +^	7	–	1	10	–	3
No. 5 Georgia Southern ^	5	–	3	10	–	5
Chattanooga	5	–	3	6	–	5
Elon	5	–	3	6	–	5
Furman	3	–	5	5	–	6
Samford	2	–	6	4	–	7
The Citadel	1	–	7	3	–	8
Western Carolina	1	–	7	2	–	9
+ – Conference co-champions; ^ – FCS playoff participant; Rankings from The Sports Network Poll

The 2010 Georgia Southern Eagles team represented Georgia Southern University in the 2010 NCAA Division I FCS football season. The Eagles were led by first-year head coach Jeff Monken and played their home games at Paulson Stadium. They are a member of the Southern Conference. They finished the season 10–5, 5–3 in Southern Conference play.

== Schedule ==
Date	Time	Opponent	Rank	Site	TV	Result	Attendance	Source
September 3	6:00 pm	Savannah State*		Paulson Stadium; Statesboro, GA		W 48–3	20,430	
September 11	3:30 pm	at Navy*		Navy–Marine Corps Memorial Stadium; Annapolis, MD	CBSCS	L 7–13	33,391	
September 18	6:00 pm	at Coastal Carolina*		Brooks Stadium; Conway, SC		W 43–26	8,857	
September 25	6:00 pm	No. 10 Elon	No. 24	Paulson Stadium; Statesboro, GA	CSS	W 38–21	18,302	
October 9	6:00 pm	No. 25 Wofford	No. 13	Paulson Stadium; Statesboro, GA	EV	L 31–33	21,403	
October 8	6:00 pm	at Chattanooga	No. 18	Finley Stadium; Chattanooga, TN	EV	L 27–35	17,414	
October 23	1:00 pm	at The Citadel		Johnson Hagood Stadium; Charleston, SC	EV	W 20–0	10,385	
October 30	2:00 pm	Samford		Paulson Stadium; Statesboro, GA	EV	L 13–20	15,341	
November 6	2:00 pm	No. 1 Appalachian State^{†}		Paulson Stadium; Statesboro, GA (rivalry)		W 21–14 ^{OT}	20,073	
November 13	3:00 pm	at Western Carolina		Bob Waters Field at E. J. Whitmire Stadium; Cullowhee, NC		W 28–6	6,244	
November 20	2:00 pm	at Furman		Paladin Stadium; Greenville, SC		W 32–28	11,781	
November 27	2:00 pm	No. 11 South Carolina State*	No. 22	Paulson Stadium; Statesboro, GA (NCAA Division I First Round)	NCAA-AA	W 41–16	11,577	
December 4	1:30 pm	at No. 4 William & Mary*	No. 22	Zable Stadium; Williamsburg, VA (NCAA Division I Second Round)	NCAA-AA	W 31–15	8,243	
December 11	2:00 pm	at No. 6 Wofford*	No. 22	Gibbs Stadium; Spartanburg, SC (NCAA Division I Quarterfinal)	ESPN3	W 23–20	11,823	
December 18	12:00 pm	at No. 5 Delaware*	No. 22	Delaware Stadium; Newark, DE (NCAA Division I Semifinal)	ESPNU	L 10–27	10,317	
*Non-conference game; ^{†}Homecoming; Rankings from The Sports Network Poll released prior to the game; All times are in Eastern time
