= 2010 South Dakota State Jackrabbits football team =

American college football season

2010 South Dakota State Jackrabbits football
- Conference: Missouri Valley Football Conference
- Record: 5–6 (4–4 MVFC)
- Head coach: John Stiegelmeier (14th season)
- Offensive coordinator: Eric Eidsness (5th season)
- Co-defensive coordinators: Clint Brown (2nd season); Jay Bubak (2nd season)
- Home stadium: Coughlin–Alumni Stadium

2010 Missouri Valley Football Conference standings
	Conf.			Overall
Team	W		L	W		L
No. 19 Northern Iowa $^	6	–	2	7	–	5
No. 17 Western Illinois ^	5	–	3	8	–	5
No. 9 North Dakota State ^	4	–	4	9	–	5
Indiana State	4	–	4	6	–	5
Illinois State	4	–	4	6	–	5
South Dakota State	4	–	4	5	–	6
Missouri State	4	–	4	5	–	6
Southern Illinois	4	–	4	5	–	6
Youngstown State	1	–	7	3	–	8
$ – Conference champion; ^ – FCS playoff participant; Rankings from The Sports Network poll

The 2010 South Dakota State Jackrabbits football team represented South Dakota State University as a member of the Missouri Valley Football Conference (MVFC) during the 2010 NCAA Division I FCS football season. Led by 14th-year head coach John Stiegelmeier, the Jackrabbits compiled an overall record of 5–6 with a mark of 4–4 in conference play, placing in a six-way tie for third in the MVFC. South Dakota State played their home games at Coughlin–Alumni Stadium in Brookings, South Dakota.

== Schedule ==
Date	Time	Opponent	Rank	Site	TV	Result	Attendance	Source
September 11	12:00 pm	at No. 16 Delaware*	No. 9	Delaware Stadium; Newark, DE		L 3–26	19,854	
September 18	6:00 pm	Illinois State	No. 20	Dana J. Dykhouse Stadium; Brookings, SD		L 14–24	12,425	
September 25	6:00 pm	at No. 6 (FBS) Nebraska*		Memorial Stadium; Lincoln, Nebraska	FSN PPV	L 3–17	85,573	
October 2	4:05 pm	at No. 17 Northern Iowa		UNI-Dome; Cedar Falls, IA	Mediacom, CFU Ch. 15	L 14–24	14,686	
October 9	4:05 pm	No. 20 Western Illinois		Coughlin–Alumni Stadium; Brookings, SD		W 33–29	11,353	
October 16	2:00 pm	at No. 17 Southern Illinois		Saluki Stadium; Carbondale, IL		W 31–10	11,136	
October 23	2:05 pm	Youngstown State		Coughlin–Alumni Stadium; Brookings, SD		W 30–20	14,697	
October 30	2:05 pm	at Indiana State		Memorial Stadium; Terre Haute, IN		L 30–41	5,347	
November 6	1:00 pm	Missouri State		Coughlin–Alumni Stadium; Brookings, SD		W 31–10	7,724	
November 13	3:10 pm	No. 24 North Dakota State		Fargodome; Fargo, ND (Dakota Marker)		L 24–31	17,037	
November 20	1:00 pm	North Dakota*		Coughlin–Alumni Stadium; Brookings, SD		W 21–0	3,918	
*Non-conference game; Rankings from The Sports Network Poll released prior to the game; All times are in Central time
