= 2010 Southern Illinois Salukis football team =

American college football season

2010 Southern Illinois Salukis football
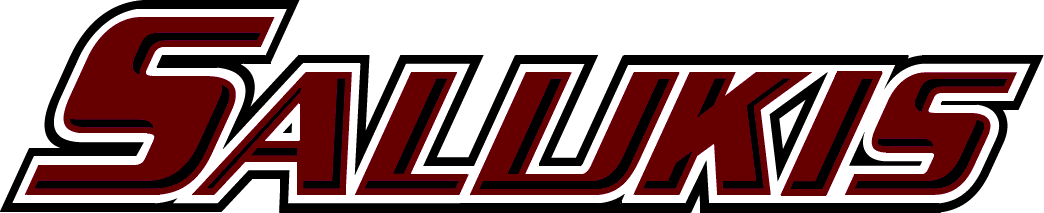
- Conference: Missouri Valley Football Conference
- Record: 5–6 (4–4 MVFC)
- Head coach: Dale Lennon (3rd season)
- Offensive coordinator: Kalen DeBoer (1st season)
- Defensive coordinator: Bubba Schweigert (3rd season)
- Home stadium: Saluki Stadium

2010 Missouri Valley Football Conference standings
	Conf.			Overall
Team	W		L	W		L
No. 19 Northern Iowa $^	6	–	2	7	–	5
No. 17 Western Illinois ^	5	–	3	8	–	5
No. 9 North Dakota State ^	4	–	4	9	–	5
Indiana State	4	–	4	6	–	5
Illinois State	4	–	4	6	–	5
South Dakota State	4	–	4	5	–	6
Missouri State	4	–	4	5	–	6
Southern Illinois	4	–	4	5	–	6
Youngstown State	1	–	7	3	–	8
$ – Conference champion; ^ – FCS playoff participant; Rankings from The Sports Network poll

The 2010 Southern Illinois Salukis football team represented Southern Illinois University Carbondale as a member of the Missouri Valley Football Conference (MVFC) during the 2010 NCAA Division I FCS football season. Led by third-year head coach Dale Lennon, the Salukis compiled an overall record of 5–6 with a mark of 4–4 in conference play, placing in a six-way tie for third in the MVFC. Southern Illinois played home games at the newly-opened Saluki Stadium in Carbondale, Illinois.

== Schedule ==
Date	Time	Opponent	Rank	Site	TV	Result	Attendance	Source
September 2	7:00 pm	Quincy*	No. 5	Saluki Stadium; Carbondale, IL		W 70–7	15,276	
September 11	6:30 pm	at Illinois*	No. 4	Memorial Stadium; Champaign, IL	BTN	L 3–35	52,217	
September 18	6:00 pm	Southeast Missouri State*	No. 5	Saluki Stadium; Carbondale, IL		L 21–24	13,078	
September 25	3:00 pm	at Youngstown State	No. 13	Stambaugh Stadium; Youngstown, OH		L 28–31	17,660	
October 2	1:00 pm	at No. 23 Illinois State	No. 24	Hancock Stadium; Normal, IL		W 38–17	7,514	
October 9	2:00 pm	No. 15 Northern Iowa^{†}	No. 23	Saluki Stadium; Carbondale, IL	FCS	W 45–38 ^{OT}	13,356	
October 16	2:00 pm	South Dakota State	No. 17	Saluki Stadium; Carbondale, IL (Family Weekend)		L 10–31	11,136	
October 30	2:00 pm	at Missouri State		Plaster Sports Complex; Springfield, MO	MC22	L 41–51	9,287	
November 6	3:00 pm	at No. 25 North Dakota State		Fargodome; Fargo, ND	ESPN3	L 6–20	12,834	
November 13	1:00 pm	No. 23 Western Illinois		Saluki Stadium; Carbondale, IL		W 20–10	6,245	
November 20	1:00 pm	Indiana State		Saluki Stadium; Carbondale, IL		W 49–21	6,247	
*Non-conference game; ^{†}Homecoming; Rankings from The Sports Network Poll released prior to the game; All times are in Central time

== NFL draft ==
The following Saluki was selected in the 2011 NFL draft following the season.

Round	Pick	Player	Position	NFL team
7	207	Korey Lindsey	Defensive back	Cincinnati Bengals
