= 2010 North Dakota State Bison football team =

American college football season

2010 North Dakota State Bison football
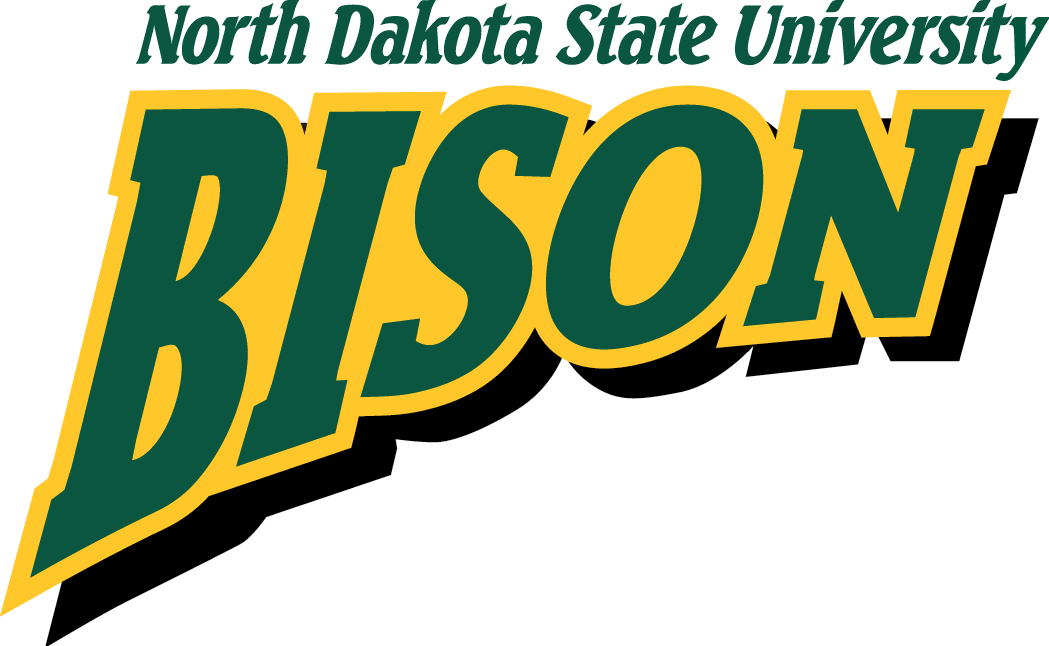

NCAA Division I Quarterfinal, L 31–38 vs. Eastern Washington
- Conference: Missouri Valley Football Conference

Ranking
- Sports Network: No. 9
- FCS Coaches: No. 9
- Record: 9–5 (4–4 MVFC)
- Head coach: Craig Bohl (8th season)
- Offensive coordinator: Brent Vigen (2nd season)
- Offensive scheme: Pro-style
- Defensive coordinator: Scottie Hazelton (1st season)
- Base defense: 3–4
- Home stadium: Fargodome

2010 Missouri Valley Football Conference standings
	Conf.			Overall
Team	W		L	W		L
No. 19 Northern Iowa $^	6	–	2	7	–	5
No. 17 Western Illinois ^	5	–	3	8	–	5
No. 9 North Dakota State ^	4	–	4	9	–	5
Indiana State	4	–	4	6	–	5
Illinois State	4	–	4	6	–	5
South Dakota State	4	–	4	5	–	6
Missouri State	4	–	4	5	–	6
Southern Illinois	4	–	4	5	–	6
Youngstown State	1	–	7	3	–	8
$ – Conference champion; ^ – FCS playoff participant; Rankings from The Sports Network poll

The 2010 North Dakota State Bison football team represented North Dakota State University in the 2010 NCAA Division I FCS football season. The Bison were led by eighth-year head coach Craig Bohl and played their home games at the Fargodome. They were a member of the Missouri Valley Football Conference. They finished the season 9–5 overall and 4–4 in MVFC play to finish tied for third place. They received an at-large qualifier bid into the FCS playoffs, their first FCS playoff bid in school history since moving to Division I in 2004 and being eligible for the playoffs in 2008.

The Bison were not expected to make the playoffs but managed enough votes to get in. NDSU punched above their seeding when then beat Robert Morris, 43–17, in the First Round and knocked off #4 Montana State in the Second Round, 42–17. In the Quarterfinals, the Bison lost on a last second fumble against #5 seeded Eastern Washington, 38–31, in overtime during a snowy game in Spokane, Washington. The Bison were driving down the field and were on the 5-yard line when quarterback Brock Jensen ran and appeared to be down at the 1-yard line; the play was called a fumble and recovered by Eastern Washington.

== Schedule ==
Date	Time	Opponent	Rank	Site	TV	Result	Attendance	Source
September 4	6:10 pm	at Kansas*		Memorial Stadium; Lawrence, KS	FCS	W 6–3	48,417	
September 11	6:30 pm	at No. 14 Northern Iowa	No. 21	UNI-Dome; Cedar Falls, IA		L 9–16	14,422	
September 18	6:00 pm	Morgan State*	No. 23	Fargodome; Fargo, ND		W 35–9	17,340	
September 25	6:10 pm	No. 21 South Dakota	No. 18	Fargodome; Fargo, ND		W 38–16	18,248	
October 2	1:00 pm	Western Illinois^{†}	No. 13	Fargodome; Fargo, ND		L 16–28	18,701	
October 9	4:10 pm	at Youngstown State	No. 18	Stambaugh Stadium; Youngstown, OH		W 34–29	15,068	
October 16	2:00 pm	at Illinois State	No. 15	Hancock Stadium; Normal, IL		L 24–34	10,131	
October 23	3:10 pm	Indiana State		Fargodome; Fargo, ND (Harvest Bowl)		W 27–15	15,245	
November 6	3:10 pm	Southern Illinois	No. 25	Fargodome; Fargo, ND		W 20–6	12,834	
November 13	3:10 pm	South Dakota State	No. 24	Fargodome; Fargo, ND (Dakota Marker)		W 31–24	17,037	
November 20	1:00 pm	at Missouri State	No. 17	Plaster Sports Complex; Springfield, MO		L 0–3	4,837	
November 27	6:05 pm	Robert Morris*	No. 25	Fargodome; Fargo, ND (NCAA Division I First Round)		W 43–17	12,202	
December 4	12:05 pm	at No. 6 Montana State*	No. 25	Bobcat Stadium; Bozeman, MT (NCAA Division I Second Round)		W 42–17	14,277	
December 11	12:35 pm	at No. 1 Eastern Washington*	No. 25	Roos Field; Cheney, WA (NCAA Division I Quarterfinal)		L 31–38 ^{OT}	4,060	
*Non-conference game; ^{†}Homecoming; Rankings from The Sports Network Poll released prior to the game; All times are in Central time

== Rankings ==
Ranking movements Legend: ██ Increase in ranking ██ Decrease in ranking — = Not ranked RV = Received votes
	Week													
Poll	Pre	1	2	3	4	5	6	7	8	9	10	11	12	Final
STATS	—	21	23	18	13	18	15	RV	RV	25	24	17	25	9
FCS Coaches	—	21	23	19	13	17	14	24	22	20	20	17	21	9

== Game summaries ==
=== At Kansas ===
	1	2	3	4	Total
Bison	0	3	3	0	6
Jayhawks	3	0	0	0	3

Statistics	NDSU	KU
First downs	10	14
Total yards	168	293
Rushing yards	73	96
Passing yards	95	197
Turnovers	1	3
Time of possession	31:05	28:55

Team	Category	Player	Statistics
North Dakota State	Passing	Jose Mohler	12/22, 95 yards, INT
North Dakota State	Rushing	D. J. McNorton	15 rushes, 58 yards
North Dakota State	Receiving	Titus Mack	4 receptions, 46 yards
Kansas	Passing	Kale Pick	13/22, 138 yards, INT
Kansas	Rushing	Daymond Patterson	3 rushes, 63 yards
Kansas	Receiving	Daymond Patterson	4 receptions, 66 yards

=== At No. 14 Northern Iowa ===
	1	2	3	4	Total
No. 21 Bison	3	0	0	6	9
No. 14 Panthers	6	3	7	0	16

Statistics	NDSU	UNI
First downs	16	16
Total yards	207	434
Rushing yards	-40	262
Passing yards	247	172
Turnovers	3	3
Time of possession	32:20	27:40

Team	Category	Player	Statistics
North Dakota State	Passing	Jose Mohler	20/35, 247 yards, 2 INT
North Dakota State	Rushing	Mike Sigers	4 rushes, 5 yards
North Dakota State	Receiving	Titus Mack	2 receptions, 74 yards
Northern Iowa	Passing	Tirrell Rennie	10/20, 172 yards, INT
Northern Iowa	Rushing	Carlos Anderson	11 rushes, 158 yards, TD
Northern Iowa	Receiving	Terrell Sinkfield	3 receptions, 85 yards

=== Morgan State ===
	1	2	3	4	Total
Bears	0	9	0	0	9
No. 23 Bison	7	7	0	21	35

Statistics	MORG	NDSU
First downs	11	16
Total yards	207	251
Rushing yards	81	128
Passing yards	126	123
Turnovers	2	1
Time of possession	37:00	23:00

Team	Category	Player	Statistics
Morgan State	Passing	Donovan Dickerson	12/24, 126 yards, 2 INT
Morgan State	Rushing	Jourdan Brooks	19 rushes, 65 yards
Morgan State	Receiving	Chuka Okakpu	5 receptions, 73 yards
North Dakota State	Passing	Brock Jensen	8/17, 117 yards, 3 TD
North Dakota State	Rushing	D. J. McNorton	14 rushes, 58 yards, TD
North Dakota State	Receiving	Landon Smith	2 receptions, 40 yards

=== No. 21 South Dakota ===
	1	2	3	4	Total
No. 21 Coyotes	7	6	0	3	16
No. 18 Bison	7	0	21	10	38

Statistics	SDAK	NDSU
First downs	19	21
Total yards	322	530
Rushing yards	165	348
Passing yards	157	182
Turnovers	2	1
Time of possession	31:17	28:43

Team	Category	Player	Statistics
South Dakota	Passing	Dante Warren	19/33, 157 yards, 2 INT
South Dakota	Rushing	Dante Warren	19 rushes, 83 yards, 2 TD
South Dakota	Receiving	Will Powell	4 receptions, 49 yards
North Dakota State	Passing	Brock Jensen	9/19, 182 yards, TD
North Dakota State	Rushing	D. J. McNorton	20 rushes, 250 yards, 3 TD
North Dakota State	Receiving	Warren Holloway	3 receptions, 109 yards, TD

=== Western Illinois ===
	1	2	3	4	Total
Leathernecks	7	14	7	0	28
No. 13 Bison	3	3	10	0	16

Statistics	WIU	NDSU
First downs		
Total yards		
Rushing yards		
Passing yards		
Turnovers		
Time of possession		

Team	Category	Player	Statistics
Western Illinois	Passing		
Western Illinois	Rushing		
Western Illinois	Receiving		
North Dakota State	Passing		
North Dakota State	Rushing		
North Dakota State	Receiving		

=== At Youngstown State ===
	1	2	3	4	Total
No. 18 Bison	0	21	7	6	34
Penguins	10	10	0	9	29

Statistics	NDSU	YSU
First downs		
Total yards		
Rushing yards		
Passing yards		
Turnovers		
Time of possession		

Team	Category	Player	Statistics
North Dakota State	Passing		
North Dakota State	Rushing		
North Dakota State	Receiving		
Youngstown State	Passing		
Youngstown State	Rushing		
Youngstown State	Receiving		

=== At Illinois State ===
	1	2	3	4	Total
No. 15 Bison	10	7	0	7	24
Redbirds	7	3	14	10	34

Statistics	NDSU	ILST
First downs		
Total yards		
Rushing yards		
Passing yards		
Turnovers		
Time of possession		

Team	Category	Player	Statistics
North Dakota State	Passing		
North Dakota State	Rushing		
North Dakota State	Receiving		
Illinois State	Passing		
Illinois State	Rushing		
Illinois State	Receiving		

=== Indiana State ===
	1	2	3	4	Total
Sycamores	3	9	0	3	15
Bison	0	7	14	6	27

Statistics	INST	NDSU
First downs		
Total yards		
Rushing yards		
Passing yards		
Turnovers		
Time of possession		

Team	Category	Player	Statistics
Indiana State	Passing		
Indiana State	Rushing		
Indiana State	Receiving		
North Dakota State	Passing		
North Dakota State	Rushing		
North Dakota State	Receiving		

=== Southern Illinois ===
	1	2	3	4	Total
Salukis	0	3	3	0	6
No. 25 Bison	10	0	3	7	20

Statistics	SIU	NDSU
First downs		
Total yards		
Rushing yards		
Passing yards		
Turnovers		
Time of possession		

Team	Category	Player	Statistics
Southern Illinois	Passing		
Southern Illinois	Rushing		
Southern Illinois	Receiving		
North Dakota State	Passing		
North Dakota State	Rushing		
North Dakota State	Receiving		

=== South Dakota State ===
	1	2	3	4	Total
Jackrabbits	0	7	7	10	24
No. 24 Bison	7	7	7	10	31

Statistics	SDSU	NDSU
First downs		
Total yards		
Rushing yards		
Passing yards		
Turnovers		
Time of possession		

Team	Category	Player	Statistics
South Dakota State	Passing		
South Dakota State	Rushing		
South Dakota State	Receiving		
North Dakota State	Passing		
North Dakota State	Rushing		
North Dakota State	Receiving		

=== At Missouri State ===
	1	2	3	4	Total
No. 17 Bison	0	0	0	0	0
Bears	0	0	3	0	3

Statistics	NDSU	MOST
First downs		
Total yards		
Rushing yards		
Passing yards		
Turnovers		
Time of possession		

Team	Category	Player	Statistics
North Dakota State	Passing		
North Dakota State	Rushing		
North Dakota State	Receiving		
Missouri State	Passing		
Missouri State	Rushing		
Missouri State	Receiving		

=== Robert Morris (NCAA Division I First Round) ===
	1	2	3	4	Total
Colonials	7	0	7	3	17
No. 25 Bison	3	3	14	23	43

Statistics	RMU	NDSU
First downs		
Total yards		
Rushing yards		
Passing yards		
Turnovers		
Time of possession		

Team	Category	Player	Statistics
Robert Morris	Passing		
Robert Morris	Rushing		
Robert Morris	Receiving		
North Dakota State	Passing		
North Dakota State	Rushing		
North Dakota State	Receiving		

=== At No. 6 Montana State (NCAA Division I Second Round) ===
	1	2	3	4	Total
No. 25 Bison	0	7	7	28	42
No. 6 Bobcats	0	7	3	7	17

Statistics	NDSU	MTST
First downs		
Total yards		
Rushing yards		
Passing yards		
Turnovers		
Time of possession		

Team	Category	Player	Statistics
North Dakota State	Passing		
North Dakota State	Rushing		
North Dakota State	Receiving		
Montana State	Passing		
Montana State	Rushing		
Montana State	Receiving		

=== At No. 1 Eastern Washington (NCAA Division I Quarterfinal) ===
	1	2	3	4	OT	Total
No. 25 Bison	0	10	14	7	0	31
No. 1 Eagles	14	3	7	7	7	38

Statistics	NDSU	EWU
First downs		
Total yards		
Rushing yards		
Passing yards		
Turnovers		
Time of possession		

Team	Category	Player	Statistics
North Dakota State	Passing		
North Dakota State	Rushing		
North Dakota State	Receiving		
Eastern Washington	Passing		
Eastern Washington	Rushing		
Eastern Washington	Receiving		
