= 2010 Elon Phoenix football team =

American college football season

2010 Elon Phoenix football
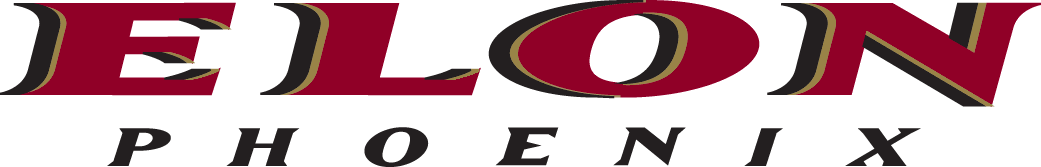
- Conference: Southern Conference
- Record: 6–5 (5–3 SoCon)
- Head coach: Pete Lembo (5th season)
- Offensive coordinator: Rich Skrosky (2nd as OC, 5th overall season)
- Defensive coordinator: Jay Bateman (5th season)
- Home stadium: Rhodes Stadium

2010 Southern Conference football standings
	Conf.			Overall
Team	W		L	W		L
No. 4 Appalachian State +^	7	–	1	10	–	3
No. 6 Wofford +^	7	–	1	10	–	3
No. 5 Georgia Southern ^	5	–	3	10	–	5
Chattanooga	5	–	3	6	–	5
Elon	5	–	3	6	–	5
Furman	3	–	5	5	–	6
Samford	2	–	6	4	–	7
The Citadel	1	–	7	3	–	8
Western Carolina	1	–	7	2	–	9
+ – Conference co-champions; ^ – FCS playoff participant; Rankings from The Sports Network Poll

The 2010 Elon Phoenix football team represented Elon University in the 2010 NCAA Division I FCS football season. The Phoenix were led by fifth-year head coach Pete Lembo and played their home games at Rhodes Stadium. They played as member of the Southern Conference. They finished the season 6–5, 5–3 in SoCon play to finish in a tie for third place.

== Schedule ==
Date	Time	Opponent	Rank	Site	TV	Result	Attendance	Source
September 4	7:00 p.m.	at Duke*	No. 7	Wallace Wade Stadium; Durham, NC	ESPN3.com	L 27–41	33,941	
September 11	7:00 p.m.	Shaw*	No. 8	Rhodes Stadium; Elon, NC		W 55–26	8,123	
September 18	1:00 p.m.	at No. 9 Richmond*	No. 7	Robins Stadium; Richmond, VA		L 21–27 ^{OT}	8,700	
September 25	6:00 p.m.	at No. 24 Georgia Southern	No. 10	Paulson Stadium; Statesboro, GA	SportSouth	L 21–38	18,302	
October 2	1:30 p.m.	Samford	No. 21	Rhodes Stadium; Elon, NC		W 24–19	10,476	
October 9	3:00 p.m.	at No. 1 Appalachian State	No. 19	Kidd Brewer Stadium; Boone, NC	SportSouth	L 31–34	31,531	
October 23	1:30 p.m.	No. 9 Wofford^{†}		Rhodes Stadium; Elon, NC		L 21–28	9,752	
October 30	2:00 p.m.	at No. 20 Chattanooga		Finley Stadium; Chattanooga, TN		W 49–35	11,095	
November 6	2:00 p.m.	at The Citadel		Johnson Hagood Stadium; Charleston, SC		W 27–16	13,225	
November 13	1:30 p.m.	Furman		Rhodes Stadium; Elon, NC		W 30–25	6,174	
November 20	3:00 p.m.	Western Carolina		Rhodes Stadium; Elon, NC		W 45–14	6,354	
*Non-conference game; ^{†}Homecoming; Rankings from the Sports Network Poll released prior to the game; All times are in Eastern time
