= 2010 Northern Iowa Panthers football team =

American college football season

2010 Northern Iowa Panthers football

MVFC champion

NCAA Division I First Round, L 7–14 vs. Lehigh
- Conference: Missouri Valley Football Conference

Ranking
- Sports Network: No. 18
- FCS Coaches: No. 19
- Record: 7–5 (6–2 MVFC)
- Head coach: Mark Farley (10th season)
- Co-offensive coordinators: Bill Salmon (10th season); Mario Verduzco (5th season)
- Defensive coordinator: Chris Klieman (3rd season)
- Home stadium: UNI-Dome

2010 Missouri Valley Football Conference standings
	Conf.			Overall
Team	W		L	W		L
No. 19 Northern Iowa $^	6	–	2	7	–	5
No. 17 Western Illinois ^	5	–	3	8	–	5
No. 9 North Dakota State ^	4	–	4	9	–	5
Indiana State	4	–	4	6	–	5
Illinois State	4	–	4	6	–	5
South Dakota State	4	–	4	5	–	6
Missouri State	4	–	4	5	–	6
Southern Illinois	4	–	4	5	–	6
Youngstown State	1	–	7	3	–	8
$ – Conference champion; ^ – FCS playoff participant; Rankings from The Sports Network poll

The 2010 Northern Iowa Panthers football team represented the University of Northern Iowa as a member of the Missouri Valley Football Conference (MVFC) during the 2010 NCAA Division I FCS football season. Led by tenth-year head coach Mark Farley, the Panthers compiled an overall record of 7–5 with a mark of 6–2 in conference play, winning the MVFC title. Northern Iowa advanced to the NCAA Division I Football Championship playoffs, where the Panthers lost in the first round to Lehigh. The team played home games at the UNI-Dome in Cedar Falls, Iowa.

== Schedule ==
Date	Time	Opponent	Rank	Site	TV	Result	Attendance	Source
September 11	6:30 pm	North Dakota State	No. 14	UNI-Dome; Cedar Falls, IA	KWWL, KCWI	W 16–9	14,422	
September 18	4:05 pm	No. 10 Stephen F. Austin*	No. 13	UNI-Dome; Cedar Falls, IA		L 20–22	12,260	
September 25	6:00 pm	at Iowa State*	No. 15	Jack Trice Stadium; Ames, IA	Mediacom	L 0–27	48,874	
October 2	4:05 pm	South Dakota State	No. 17	UNI-Dome; Cedar Falls, IA	Mediacom, CFU Ch. 15	W 24–14	14,686	
October 9	2:00 pm	at Southern Illinois	No. 15	Saluki Stadium; Carbondale, IL	MVFC-TV	L 38–45 ^{OT}	13,356	
October 16	4:05 pm	at South Dakota*	No. 22	DakotaDome; Vermillion, SD		W 19–14	9,169	
October 23	4:05 pm	Illinois State^{†}	No. 19	UNI-Dome; Cedar Falls, IA	KWWL/KCWI	W 42–14	15,730	
October 30	1:00 pm	at Youngstown State	No. 19	Stambaugh Stadium; Youngstown, OH		W 34–30	13,039	
November 6	3:05 pm	at Indiana State	No. 17	Memorial Stadium; Terre Haute, IN		W 30–20	6,038	
November 13	6:00 pm	Missouri State	No. 16	UNI-Dome; Cedar Falls, IA	Mediacom, CFU Ch. 15	W 38–14	14,892	
November 20	1:00 pm	at Western Illinois	No. 13	Hanson Field; Macomb, IL		L 14–30	8,217	
November 27	12:00 pm	Lehigh*	No. 16	UNI-Dome; Cedar Falls, IA (NCAA Division I First Round)		L 7–14	5,990	
*Non-conference game; ^{†}Homecoming; Rankings from The Sports Network Poll released prior to the game; All times are in Central time

== Rankings ==
Ranking movements Legend: ██ Increase in ranking ██ Decrease in ranking
	Week													
Poll	Pre	1	2	3	4	5	6	7	8	9	10	11	12	Final
The Sports Network	14	14	13	15	17	15	22	19	19	17	16	13	16	19
FCS Coaches	13	13	10	15	22	18	24	22	19	17	16	12	16	18

== Preseason ==
Northern Iowa was picked to finish fourth in the Missouri Valley Football Conference preseason poll. Running back Carols Anderson and tight end Schuylar Oordt were each named to the preseason all-conference team. Tight end Ryan Mahaffey and place kicker Billy Hallgren were each honorable mentions.

== Personnel ==
=== Coaching staff ===
Name	Position	Year at Northern Iowa	Alma mater (year)
Mark Farley	Head coach	10th	Northern Iowa (1987)
Rick Nelson	Recruiting coordinator Offensive Line	11th	Northern Iowa (1984)
Bill Salmon	Associate head coach Offensive coordinator Receivers	10th	Northern Iowa (1980)
Mario Verduzco	Co-offensive coordinator Quarterbacks	10th	San José State (1988)
Dedric Ward	Wide receivers	1st	University of Northern Iowa (1997)
Chris Klieman	Defensive coordinator Secondary	5th	Northern Iowa (1990)
Dan Clark	Tight ends	1st	Simpson (1995)
Jeremiah Johnson	Recruiting coordinator/Asst. Defensive Coach	4th	Kansas (2000)
Jovan Dewitt	Linebackers	2nd	Northern Michigan (1999)
Eric Sanders	Asst. Wide Receivers	1st	Northern Iowa (2008)
Matt Entz	Defensive line	1st	Wartburg (1995)
