= 2010 Youngstown State Penguins football team =

American college football season

2010 Youngstown State Penguins football
- Conference: Missouri Valley Football Conference
- Record: 3–8 (1–7 MVFC)
- Head coach: Eric Wolford (1st season)
- Offensive coordinator: Shane Montgomery (1st season)
- Defensive coordinator: Rick Kravitz (1st season)
- Home stadium: Stambaugh Stadium

2010 Missouri Valley Football Conference standings
	Conf.			Overall
Team	W		L	W		L
No. 19 Northern Iowa $^	6	–	2	7	–	5
No. 17 Western Illinois ^	5	–	3	8	–	5
No. 9 North Dakota State ^	4	–	4	9	–	5
Indiana State	4	–	4	6	–	5
Illinois State	4	–	4	6	–	5
South Dakota State	4	–	4	5	–	6
Missouri State	4	–	4	5	–	6
Southern Illinois	4	–	4	5	–	6
Youngstown State	1	–	7	3	–	8
$ – Conference champion; ^ – FCS playoff participant; Rankings from The Sports Network poll

The 2010 Youngstown State Penguins football team represented Youngstown State University as a member of the Missouri Valley Football Conference (MVFC) during the 2010 NCAA Division I FCS football season. Led by first-year head coach Eric Wolford, the Penguins compiled an overall record of 3–8 with a mark of 1–7 in conference play, placing last out of nine teams in the MVFC. Youngstown State played their home games at Stambaugh Stadium in Youngstown, Ohio.

== Schedule ==
Date	Time	Opponent	Rank	Site	TV	Result	Attendance	Source
September 4	12:00 pm	at No. 19 Penn State*		Beaver Stadium; University Park, PA	BTN	L 14–44	101,213	
September 11	6:00 pm	Butler*		Stambaugh Stadium; Youngstown, OH		W 31–7	18,025	
September 18	6:00 pm	Central Connecticut State*		Stambaugh Stadium; Youngstown, OH		W 63–24	16,386	
September 25	4:00 pm	No. 13 Southern Illinois		Stambaugh Stadium; Youngstown, OH		W 31–28	17,660	
October 2	2:00 pm	at Missouri State	No. 22	Plaster Sports Complex; Springfield, MO		L 25–35	13,489	
October 9	4:07 pm	No. 18 North Dakota State		Stambaugh Stadium; Youngstown, OH		L 29–34	15,068	
October 16	7:10 pm	at Western Illinois		Hanson Field; Macomb, IL		L 38–40	13,404	
October 23	3:05 pm	at South Dakota State		Coughlin–Alumni Stadium; Brookings, SD		L 20–30	14,697	
October 30	1:00 pm	No. 19 Northern Iowa^{†}		Stambaugh Stadium; Youngstown, OH		L 30–34	13,039	
November 6	2:05 pm	at Illinois State		Hancock Stadium; Normal, IL		L 39–41	10,076	
November 13	1:00 pm	Indiana State		Stambaugh Stadium; Youngstown, OH		L 24–30	10,483	
*Non-conference game; ^{†}Homecoming; Rankings from The Sports Network Poll released prior to the game; All times are in Eastern time
