= 2010 The Citadel Bulldogs football team =

American college football season

2010 The Citadel Bulldogs football
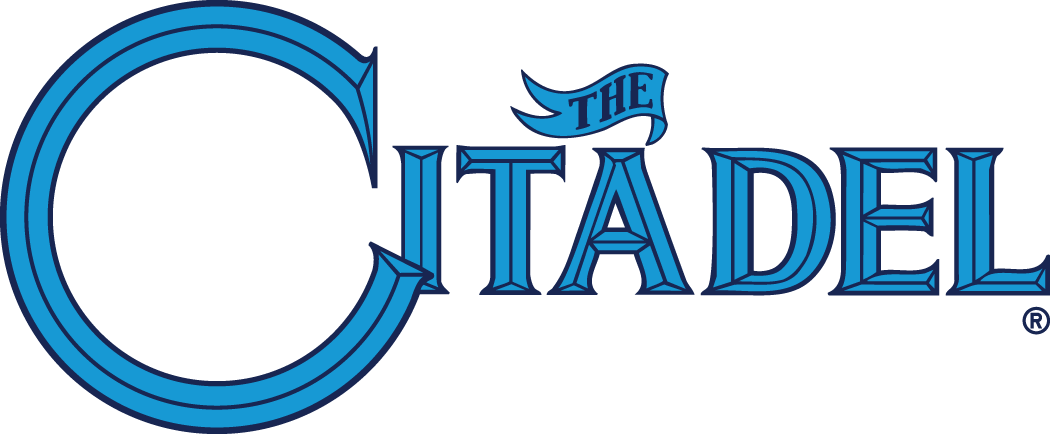
- Conference: Southern Conference
- Record: 3–8 (1–7 SoCon)
- Head coach: Kevin Higgins (6th season)
- Offensive coordinator: Bob Bodine
- Defensive coordinator: Josh Conklin (1st season)
- Home stadium: Johnson Hagood Stadium

2010 Southern Conference football standings
	Conf.			Overall
Team	W		L	W		L
No. 4 Appalachian State +^	7	–	1	10	–	3
No. 6 Wofford +^	7	–	1	10	–	3
No. 5 Georgia Southern ^	5	–	3	10	–	5
Chattanooga	5	–	3	6	–	5
Elon	5	–	3	6	–	5
Furman	3	–	5	5	–	6
Samford	2	–	6	4	–	7
The Citadel	1	–	7	3	–	8
Western Carolina	1	–	7	2	–	9
+ – Conference co-champions; ^ – FCS playoff participant; Rankings from The Sports Network Poll

The 2010 The Citadel Bulldogs football team represented The Citadel, The Military College of South Carolina in the 2010 NCAA Division I FCS football season. The Bulldogs were led by sixth year head coach Kevin Higgins and played their home games at Johnson Hagood Stadium. They played as members of the Southern Conference, as they have since 1936.

== Schedule ==
Date	Time	Opponent	Site	TV	Result	Attendance
September 4	1:00 pm	Chowan*	Johnson Hagood Stadium; Charleston, SC	BI	W 56–14	9,016
September 11	7:00 pm	at No. 23 (FBS) Arizona*	Arizona Stadium; Tucson, AZ		L 6–52	54,814
September 18	7:00 pm	Presbyterian*	Johnson Hagood Stadium; Charleston, SC	BI	W 26–14	12,792
September 25	2:00 pm	at No. 23 Furman	Paladin Stadium; Greenville, SC (rivalry)		L 14–31	12,791
October 2	1:00 pm	Western Carolina	Johnson Hagood Stadium; Charleston, SC	BI	L 13–24	10,207
October 9	2:00 pm	Chattanooga	Johnson Hagood Stadium; Charleston, SC	BI	L 10–28	13,044
October 22	6:00 pm	at No. 1 Appalachian State	Kidd Brewer Stadium; Boone, NC		L 10–39	29,519
October 23	1:00 pm	Georgia Southern	Johnson Hagood Stadium; Charleston, SC	BI	L 0–20	10,385
October 30	1:30 pm	at No. 9 Wofford	Gibbs Stadium; Spartanburg, SC (rivalry)	SSN	L 0–35	10,466
November 6	2:00 pm	Elon^{†}	Johnson Hagood Stadium; Charleston, SC	BI	L 16–27	13,225
November 20	2:00 pm	at Samford	Seibert Stadium; Homewood, AL		W 13–12	6,945
*Non-conference game; ^{†}Homecoming; Rankings from The Sports Network Poll released prior to the game; All times are in Eastern time

== NFL Draft selections ==
Year	Round	Pick	Overall	Name	Team	Position
2010	3	24	88	Andre Roberts	Arizona Cardinals	WR
