= 2010 Western Carolina Catamounts football team =

American college football season

2010 Western Carolina Catamounts football
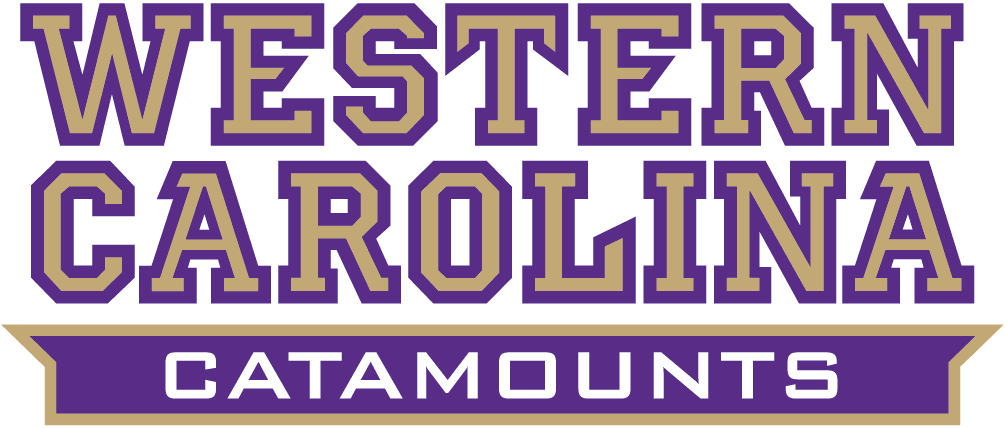
- Conference: Southern Conference
- Record: 2–9 (1–7 SoCon)
- Head coach: Dennis Wagner (3rd season)
- Offensive coordinator: Keith Heckendorf (3rd season)
- Defensive coordinator: Matt Pawlowski (3rd season)
- Home stadium: Bob Waters Field at E. J. Whitmire Stadium

2010 Southern Conference football standings
	Conf.			Overall
Team	W		L	W		L
No. 4 Appalachian State +^	7	–	1	10	–	3
No. 6 Wofford +^	7	–	1	10	–	3
No. 5 Georgia Southern ^	5	–	3	10	–	5
Chattanooga	5	–	3	6	–	5
Elon	5	–	3	6	–	5
Furman	3	–	5	5	–	6
Samford	2	–	6	4	–	7
The Citadel	1	–	7	3	–	8
Western Carolina	1	–	7	2	–	9
+ – Conference co-champions; ^ – FCS playoff participant; Rankings from The Sports Network poll

The 2010 Western Carolina Catamounts team represented Western Carolina University as a member of the Southern Conference (SoCon) during the 2010 NCAA Division I FCS football season. Led by third-year head coach Dennis Wagner, the Catamounts compiled an overall record of 2–9 with a mark of 1–7 in conference play, tying for eighth place in the SoCon. Western Carolina played home games at Bob Waters Field at E. J. Whitmire Stadium in Cullowhee, North Carolina.

== Schedule ==
Date	Time	Opponent	Site	TV	Result	Attendance
September 4	6:00 pm	at NC State*	Carter–Finley Stadium; Raleigh, NC	ESPN3	L 7–48	56,417
September 11	6:00 pm	Tusculum*	Bob Waters Field at E. J. Whitmire Stadium; Cullowhee, NC		L 30–54	4,471
September 18	6:00 pm	at Gardner–Webb*	Ernest W. Spangler Stadium; Boiling Springs, NC		W 28–14	5,780
September 25	6:00 pm	Chattanooga	Bob Waters Field at E. J. Whitmire Stadium; Cullowhee, NC		L 21–27	10,187
October 2	1:00 pm	at The Citadel	Johnson Hagood Stadium; Charleston, SC		W 24–13	10,207
October 9	3:00 pm	Samford^{†}	Bob Waters Field at E. J. Whitmire Stadium; Cullowhee, NC		L 7–38	7,444
October 16	1:30 pm	at No. 14 Wofford	Gibbs Stadium; Spartanburg, SC		L 14–45	8,248
October 23	3:00 pm	No. 1 Appalachian State	Bob Waters Field at E. J. Whitmire Stadium; Cullowhee, NC (Battle for the Old Mountain Jug)		L 14–37	14,004
November 6	12:30 pm	at Furman	Paladin Stadium; Greenville, SC		L 17–31	9,027
November 13	3:00 pm	Georgia Southern	Bob Waters Field at E. J. Whitmire Stadium; Cullowhee, NC		L 6–28	6,244
November 20	6:00 pm	at Elon	Rhodes Stadium; Elon, NC		L 14–45	6,354
*Non-conference game; ^{†}Homecoming; Rankings from The Sports Network Poll released prior to the game; All times are in Eastern time
