= Dean Hood =

American football player and coach (born 1963)

Current position
- Title: Safeties coach
- Team: Marshall
- Conference: Sun Belt

Biographical details
- Born: November 15, 1963 (age 62); Ashtabula, Ohio, U.S.

Playing career
- 1983–1985: Ohio Wesleyan
- Position: Defensive back

Coaching career (HC unless noted)
- 1986–1987: Fairmont State (DB)
- 1989: Colgate (DB)
- 1990–1993: Glenville State (DC)
- 1994–1998: Eastern Kentucky (DC/ST)
- 1999–2000: Ohio (DB)
- 2001–2007: Wake Forest (DC)
- 2008–2015: Eastern Kentucky
- 2016–2017: Charlotte (AHC/TE)
- 2017: Kentucky (ST/OLB)
- 2018–2019: Kentucky (ST/DB)
- 2020–2023: Murray State
- 2026–present: Marshall (S)

Administrative career (AD unless noted)
- 2024–2025: Kentucky (DPD)

Head coaching record
- Overall: 70–63
- Tournaments: 0–3 (NCAA D-I playoffs)

Accomplishments and honors

Championships
- 2 OVC (2008, 2011)

Awards
- 2× OVC Coach of the Year (2008, 2020); AFCA Region Coach of the Year (2011)

Dean Scott Hood (born November 15, 1963) is an American college football coach who currently works as the safeties coach at Marshall. He was the head football coach at Murray State University from 2020 to 2023 and at Eastern Kentucky University from 2008 to 2015. His inaugural 2008 season ended successfully as he led the Colonels to the 2008 Ohio Valley Conference football title.

== Coaching career ==
Hood was the defensive coordinator at Wake Forest University from 2001 to 2007, winning the ACC Championship in 2006 by beating Georgia Tech in the ACC Championship Game. In that 2006 season, Hood's defense was ranked second in the conference in scoring defense (14.7/game) and led the league in interceptions with 22. Wake Forest went on to accept their first, and only, BCS Bowl bid to play Louisville in the Orange Bowl.

He also had a five-year stint at Eastern Kentucky from 1994 to 1998 season as an assistant coach under Roy Kidd.

=== Eastern Kentucky ===
Coach Hood took over as head coach for the Eastern Kentucky Colonels in 2008, winning the Ohio Valley Conference and making an appearance in the FCS playoffs in his first season. For his efforts in his inaugural season, Coach Hood was named Ohio Valley Conference Coach of the Year in 2008. Three seasons later in 2011, Hood's Colonels again won the Ohio Valley Conference and made Hood's second appearance in the FCS playoffs.

Since taking over the helm in 2008, Eastern Kentucky has won more conference games than any other team in the Ohio Valley Conference. Hood was relieved of his coaching duties at Eastern on November 23, 2015.

=== Charlotte ===
Hood was announced as assistant head coach and tight ends coach for the Charlotte 49ers under head coach Brad Lambert on December 18, 2015. Lambert had worked with Hood at Wake Forest and had been his replacement as defensive coordinator for the Demon Deacons.

=== Kentucky ===
On February 15, 2017, Hood left Charlotte to be the special teams coordinator at Kentucky.

=== Murray State ===
On December 13, 2019, Hood was hired to be the head coach at Murray State. On January 1, 2024, Hood announced his retirement from Murray State and coaching.

=== Marshall ===
On December 27, 2025, it was reported that Hood was hired to coach safeties at Marshall under head coach, Tony Gibson.

== Head coaching record ==
Year	Team	Overall	Conference	Standing	Bowl/playoffs	TSN/STATS^{#}
Eastern Kentucky Colonels (Ohio Valley Conference) (2008–2015)
2008	Eastern Kentucky	8–4	7–1	1st	L NCAA Division I First Round	19
2009	Eastern Kentucky	5–6	5–3	T–2nd		
2010	Eastern Kentucky	6–5	5–2	T–2nd		
2011	Eastern Kentucky	7–5	6–2	T–1st	L NCAA Division I First Round	
2012	Eastern Kentucky	8–3	6–2	T–2nd		19
2013	Eastern Kentucky	6–6	4–4	T–5th		
2014	Eastern Kentucky	9–4	6–2	2nd	L NCAA Division I First Round	18
2015	Eastern Kentucky	6–5	5–3	4th		
Eastern Kentucky:		55–38	44–19			
Murray State Racers (Ohio Valley Conference) (2020–2022)
2020–21	Murray State	5–2	5–2	2nd		
2021	Murray State	6–5	3–3	T–4th		
2022	Murray State	2–9	1–4	T–6th		
Murray State Racers (Missouri Valley Football Conference) (2023)
2023	Murray State	2–9	1–7	T–10th		
Murray State:		15–25	10–16			
Total:		70–63				
National championship Conference title Conference division title or championship game berth
