= 2010 Southeast Missouri State Redhawks football team =

American college football season

2010 Southeast Missouri State Redhawks football
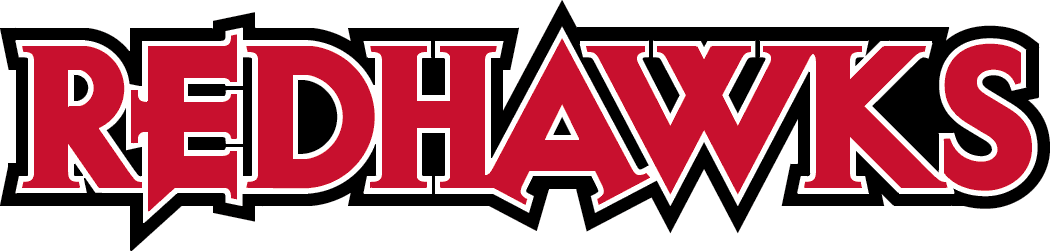

OVC champion

NCAA Division I Second Round, L 17–37 vs. Eastern Washington
- Conference: Ohio Valley Conference

Ranking
- Sports Network: No. 13
- FCS Coaches: No. 13
- Record: 9–3 (7–1 OVC)
- Head coach: Tony Samuel (5th season)
- Offensive coordinator: Vincent White (5th season)
- Offensive scheme: Multiple
- Defensive coordinator: Tim McGuire (5th season)
- Base defense: 4–3
- Home stadium: Houck Stadium

2010 Ohio Valley Conference football standings
	Conf.			Overall
Team	W		L	W		L
No. 13 Southeast Missouri State $^	7	–	1	9	–	3
No. 12 Jacksonville State ^	6	–	2	9	–	3
Eastern Kentucky	5	–	2	6	–	5
Murray State	5	–	3	6	–	5
UT Martin	5	–	3	6	–	5
Tennessee Tech	4	–	4	5	–	6
Eastern Illinois	2	–	6	2	–	9
Austin Peay	1	–	7	2	–	9
Tennessee State	0	–	7	3	–	8
$ – Conference champion; ^ – FCS playoff participant; Rankings from The Sports Network poll

The 2010 Southeast Missouri State Redhawks football team represented Southeast Missouri State University as a member of the Ohio Valley Conference (OVC) during the 2010 NCAA Division I FCS football season. Led by fifth-year head coach Tony Samuel, the Redhawks compiled an overall record of 9–3 with a mark of 7–1 in conference play, winning the OVC title. Southeast Missouri State received an automatic bid to the NCAA Division I Football Championship playoffs, where the Redhawks lost in second round to the eventual national champion, Eastern Washington. The team played home games at Houck Stadium in Cape Girardeau, Missouri.

2006 was the first and only winning season in Samuel's tenure as Southeast Missouri State's head coach. It was also the Redhawks's first winning season since 2002 and first-ever FCS playoff appearance.

== Schedule ==
Date	Time	Opponent	Rank	Site	TV	Result	Attendance
September 2	6:00 p.m.	at Ball State*		Scheumann Stadium; Muncie, IN		L 10–27	10,753
September 11	6:00 p.m.	at Murray State		Roy Stewart Stadium; Murray, KY	WQWQ	W 30–17	7,014
September 18	6:00 p.m.	at No. 5 Southern Illinois*		Saluki Stadium; Carbondale, IL		W 24–21	13,078
September 25	6:00 p.m.	Tennessee Tech		Houck Stadium; Cape Girardeau, MO (Family Weekend)	KFVS	W 23–21	8,732
October 2	1:30 p.m.	at Eastern Illinois		O'Brien Field; Charleston, IL	ESPN3	W 28–13	8,007
October 9	6:00 p.m.	Tennessee State	No. 25	Houck Stadium; Cape Girardeau, MO	KFVS	W 19–17	10,316
October 16	6:00 p.m.	at Austin Peay	No. 18	Governors Stadium; Clarksville, TN	WQWQ	W 41–24	2,917
October 23	1:00 p.m.	Eastern Kentucky	No. 13	Houck Stadium; Cape Girardeau, MO	KFVS	W 40–21	6,022
October 30	1:00 p.m.	UT Martin^{†}	No. 11	Houck Stadium; Cape Girardeau, MO	KFVS	W 24–17	11,126
November 6	1:00 p.m.	Southwest Baptist*	No. 9	Houck Stadium; Cape Girardeau, MO	KFVS	W 40–14	5,513
November 13	3:05 p.m.	at No. 6 Jacksonville State	No. 7	Burgess–Snow Field at JSU Stadium; Jacksonville, AL	ESPN3	L 27–29	20,237
December 4	3:05 p.m.	at No. 1 Eastern Washington*	No. 9	Roos Field; Cheney, WA (NCAA Division I Second Round)	WQWQ	L 17–37	3,665
*Non-conference game; ^{†}Homecoming; Rankings from The Sports Network Poll released prior to the game; All times are in Central time

== Personnel ==
=== Coaching staff ===
Name	Position	Seasons at Southeast Missouri State	Alma mater
Tony Samuel	Head coach	5	Nebraska (1981)
Brian Boerboom	Offensive line	5	Nebraska (1992)
Doug Brady	Graduate assistant, quarterbacks	3	Menlo (2006)
Lorenzo Brinkley	Wide receivers	5	Nebraska (1993)
Troy Dumas	Linebackers	5	Nebraska (1995)
Justin Kramer	Tight ends, offensive tackles, recruiting coordinator	5	Southern Illinois (2005)
Tim McGuire	Defensive coordinator	5	Nebraska (1975)
Chris Norris	Running backs, special teams	5	Nebraska–Omaha (1999)
Adam Schwent	Defensive line	2	Southeast Missouri State (2008)
Vincent White	Assistant head coach, offensive coordinator	5	Stanford (1984)
Kenny Wilhite	Cornerbacks	5	Nebraska (1992)
Jeff Lee	Strength and Conditioning	3	Western Illinois University (2003)
