= 2010 Wofford Terriers football team =

American college football season

2010 Wofford Terriers football

SoCon co-champion

NCAA Division I Quarterfinal, L 20–23 vs. Georgia Southern
- Conference: Southern Conference

Ranking
- Sports Network: No. 6
- Record: 10–3 (7–1 SoCon)
- Head coach: Mike Ayers (23rd season)
- Home stadium: Gibbs Stadium

2010 Southern Conference football standings
	Conf.			Overall
Team	W		L	W		L
No. 4 Appalachian State +^	7	–	1	10	–	3
No. 6 Wofford +^	7	–	1	10	–	3
No. 5 Georgia Southern ^	5	–	3	10	–	5
Chattanooga	5	–	3	6	–	5
Elon	5	–	3	6	–	5
Furman	3	–	5	5	–	6
Samford	2	–	6	4	–	7
The Citadel	1	–	7	3	–	8
Western Carolina	1	–	7	2	–	9
+ – Conference co-champions; ^ – FCS playoff participant; Rankings from The Sports Network Poll

The 2010 Wofford Terriers football team represented Wofford College during the 2010 NCAA Division I FCS football season. The team was led by 23rd-year head coach Mike Ayers and played its home games at Gibbs Stadium. It finished the regular season with a 9–2 record overall and a 7–1 record in the Southern Conference, making it conference co-champion alongside Appalachian State. The team qualified for the playoffs, in which they were eliminated in the quarterfinals by Georgia Southern.

== Schedule ==
Date	Time	Opponent	Rank	Site	TV	Result	Attendance	Source
September 4	7:00 pm	at Ohio*		Peden Stadium; Athens, OH		L 10–33	22,955	
September 11	1:30 pm	at Charleston Southern*		Buccaneer Field; Charleston, SC		W 34–23	3,297	
September 18	7:00 pm	Union*		Gibbs Stadium; Spartanburg, SC		W 48–10	7,053	
October 2	1:30 pm	No. 18 Furman		Gibbs Stadium; Spartanburg, SC (rivalry)		W 38–17	9,290	
October 9	6:00 pm	at No. 13 Georgia Southern	No. 25	Paulson Stadium; Statesboro, GA		W 33–31	21,403	
October 16	1:30 pm	Western Carolina	No. 14	Gibbs Stadium; Spartanburg, SC		W 45–14	8,248	
October 23	1:30 pm	at Elon	No. 9	Rhodes Stadium; Elon, NC		W 28–21	9,752	
October 30	1:30 pm	The Citadel	No. 9	Gibbs Stadium; Spartanburg, SC (rivalry)	SSN	W 35–0	10,466	
November 6	3:00 pm	at Samford	No. 7	Seibert Stadium; Birmingham, AL		W 10–3	7,563	
November 13	3:00 pm	at No. 3 Appalachian State	No. 4	Kidd Brewer Stadium; Boone, NC	SportSouth	L 13–43	28,622	
November 20	3:00 pm	Chattanooga	No. 9	Gibbs Stadium; Spartanburg, SC		W 45–14	7,355	
December 4	12:00 pm	at No. 8 Jacksonville State*	No. 7	Burgess-Snow Field; Jacksonville, AL (FCS Playoffs Second Round)	ESPN3	W 38–17	11,817	
December 11	2:00 pm	No. 22 Georgia Southern	No. 6	Gibbs Stadium; Spartanburg, SC (FCS Playoffs Quarterfinals)	ESPN3	L 20–23	11,823	
*Non-conference game; Rankings from The Sports Network Poll released prior to the game; All times are in Eastern time
