= 2010 Tennessee Tech Golden Eagles football team =

American college football season

2010 Tennessee Tech Golden Eagles football
- Conference: Ohio Valley Conference
- Record: 5–6 (4–4 OVC)
- Head coach: Watson Brown (4th season)
- Offensive scheme: Multiple
- Defensive coordinator: Billy Taylor (3rd season)
- Base defense: Multiple 3–4
- Home stadium: Tucker Stadium

2010 Ohio Valley Conference football standings
	Conf.			Overall
Team	W		L	W		L
No. 13 Southeast Missouri State $^	7	–	1	9	–	3
No. 12 Jacksonville State ^	6	–	2	9	–	3
Eastern Kentucky	5	–	2	6	–	5
Murray State	5	–	3	6	–	5
UT Martin	5	–	3	6	–	5
Tennessee Tech	4	–	4	5	–	6
Eastern Illinois	2	–	6	2	–	9
Austin Peay	1	–	7	2	–	9
Tennessee State	0	–	7	3	–	8
$ – Conference champion; ^ – FCS playoff participant; Rankings from The Sports Network poll

The 2010 Tennessee Tech Golden Eagles football team represented Tennessee Technological University as a member of Ohio Valley Conference (OVC) during the 2010 NCAA Division I FCS football season. Led by fourth-year head coach Watson Brown, the Golden Eagles compiled an overall record of 5–6 overall with a mark of 4–4 in conference play, placing in sixth in the OVC. The team played home games at Tucker Stadium in Cookeville, Tennessee.

== Schedule ==
Date	Time	Opponent	Site	TV	Result	Attendance
September 4	6:00 pm	at No. 17 (FBS) Arkansas*	Donald W. Reynolds Razorback Stadium; Fayetteville, AR		L 3–44	69,596
September 11	6:00 pm	at No. 4 (FBS) TCU*	Amon G. Carter Stadium; Fort Worth, TX		L 7–62	37,117
September 16	7:00 pm	Lane*	Tucker Stadium; Cookeville, TN		W 43–0	8,522
September 25	6:00 pm	at Southeast Missouri State	Houck Stadium; Cape Girardeau, MO	KFVS	L 21–23	8,732
September 30	7:00 pm	UT Martin	Tucker Stadium; Cookeville, TN (Sgt. York Trophy)		L 24–27	7,869
October 9	4:00 pm	at Austin Peay	Governors Stadium; Clarksville, TN (Sgt. York Trophy)		W 34–21	7,218
October 16	7:00 pm	Eastern Illinois	Tucker Stadium; Cookeville, TN	WCTE	W 34–20	4,420
October 23	6:00 pm	at Tennessee State	LP Field; Nashville, TN (Sgt. York Trophy)		W 21–10	6,739
November 6	1:00 pm	at Murray State	Roy Stewart Stadium; Murray, KY		L 13–44	4,114
November 13	1:30 pm	Eastern Kentucky^{†}	Tucker Stadium; Cookeville, TN		L 29–42	10,216
November 20	4:00 pm	No. 4 Jacksonville State	Tucker Stadium; Cookeville, TN	ESPN3	W 35–24	4,576
*Non-conference game; ^{†}Homecoming; Rankings from The Sports Network Poll released prior to the game; All times are in Central time
