= 2010 Missouri State Bears football team =

American college football season

2010 Missouri State Bears football
- Conference: Missouri Valley Football Conference
- Record: 5–6 (4–4 MVFC)
- Head coach: Terry Allen (5th season)
- Offensive coordinator: Rob Christophel (5th season)
- Defensive coordinator: D. J. Vokolek (5th season)
- Captains: David Arkin; Cody Kirby; Waylon Richardet; Skylar Smith; Antione Wilkinson
- Home stadium: Plaster Sports Complex

2010 Missouri Valley Football Conference standings
	Conf.			Overall
Team	W		L	W		L
No. 19 Northern Iowa $^	6	–	2	7	–	5
No. 17 Western Illinois ^	5	–	3	8	–	5
No. 9 North Dakota State ^	4	–	4	9	–	5
Indiana State	4	–	4	6	–	5
Illinois State	4	–	4	6	–	5
South Dakota State	4	–	4	5	–	6
Missouri State	4	–	4	5	–	6
Southern Illinois	4	–	4	5	–	6
Youngstown State	1	–	7	3	–	8
$ – Conference champion; ^ – FCS playoff participant; Rankings from The Sports Network poll

The 2010 Missouri State Bears football team represented Missouri State University as a member of the Missouri Valley Football Conference (MVFC) during the 2010 NCAA Division I FCS football season. Led by fifth-year head coach Terry Allen, the Bears compiled an overall record of 5–6, with a mark of 4–4 in conference play, and finished tied for third in the MVFC.

== Schedule ==
Date	Opponent	Site	Result	Attendance	Source
September 3	Eastern Kentucky*	Plaster Sports Complex; Springfield, MO	W 31–9	7,391	
September 11	at Kansas State*	Bill Snyder Family Football Stadium; Manhattan, KS	L 24–48	48,672	
September 25	at No. 23 Illinois State	Hancock Stadium; Normal, IL	L 41–44 ^{2OT}	5,417	
October 2	No. 22 Youngstown State	Plaster Sports Complex; Springfield, MO	W 35–25	13,489	
October 9	at Murray State*	Roy Stewart Stadium; Murray, KY	L 59–72	7,806	
October 16	at Indiana State	Memorial Stadium; Terre Haute, IN	L 35–38 ^{OT}	12,764	
October 23	No. 21 Western Illinois	Plaster Sports Complex; Springfield, MO	W 31–28		
October 30	Southern Illinois	Plaster Sports Complex; Springfield, MO	W 51–41	9,287	
November 6	at South Dakota State	Coughlin–Alumni Stadium; Brookings, SD	L 10–31	7,724	
November 13	at No. 16 Northern Iowa	UNI-Dome; Cedar Falls, IA	L 14–38	14,892	
November 20	No. 17 North Dakota State	Plaster Sports Complex; Springfield, MO	W 3–0	4,837	
*Non-conference game; Rankings from The Sports Network Poll released prior to the game
