= 2010 Indiana State Sycamores football team =

American college football season

2010 Indiana State Sycamores football
- Conference: Missouri Valley Football Conference
- Record: 6–5 (4–4 MVFC)
- Head coach: Trent Miles (3rd season)
- Offensive coordinator: Steve Englehart (1st season)
- Co-defensive coordinator: Shannon Jackson (3rd season)
- Home stadium: Memorial Stadium

2010 Missouri Valley Football Conference standings
	Conf.			Overall
Team	W		L	W		L
No. 19 Northern Iowa $^	6	–	2	7	–	5
No. 17 Western Illinois ^	5	–	3	8	–	5
No. 9 North Dakota State ^	4	–	4	9	–	5
Indiana State	4	–	4	6	–	5
Illinois State	4	–	4	6	–	5
South Dakota State	4	–	4	5	–	6
Missouri State	4	–	4	5	–	6
Southern Illinois	4	–	4	5	–	6
Youngstown State	1	–	7	3	–	8
$ – Conference champion; ^ – FCS playoff participant; Rankings from The Sports Network poll

The 2010 Indiana State Sycamores football team represented Indiana State University as a member of the Missouri Valley Football Conference (MVFC) during the 2010 NCAA Division I FCS football season. Led by third-year head coach Trent Miles, the Sycamores compiled an overall record of 6–5 with a mark of 4–4 in conference play, tying for third place in the MVFC. Indiana State played home games at Memorial Stadium in Terre Haute, Indiana.

== Schedule ==
Date	Time	Opponent	Site	TV	Result	Attendance	Source
September 4	6:00 pm	Saint Joseph's (IN)*	Memorial Stadium; Terre Haute, IN		W 57–7	12,764	
September 11	12:00 pm	at Cincinnati*	Nippert Stadium; Cincinnati, OH	FSN Ohio	L 7–40	30,807	
September 25	4:00 pm	at Western Illinois	Hanson Field; Macomb, IL		L 7–40	16,368	
October 2	5:05 pm	Quincy*	Memorial Stadium; Terre Haute, IN		W 56–22	12,764	
October 9	3:05 pm	Illinois State^{†}	Memorial Stadium; Terre Haute, IN		W 59–24	8,294	
October 16	3:00 pm	Missouri State	Memorial Stadium; Terre Haute, IN		W 38–35 ^{OT}	12,764	
October 23	4:10 pm	at North Dakota State	Fargodome; Fargo, ND (Harvest Bowl)		L 15–27	15,245	
October 30	3:05 pm	South Dakota State	Memorial Stadium; Terre Haute, IN		W 41–30	5,347	
November 6	4:05 pm	No. 17 Northern Iowa	Memorial Stadium; Terre Haute, IN		L 20–30	6,038	
November 13	1:00 pm	at Youngstown State	Stambaugh Stadium; Youngstown, OH		W 30–24	10,483	
November 20	2:00 pm	at Southern Illinois	Saluki Stadium; Carbondale, IL		L 21–49	6,247	
*Non-conference game; ^{†}Homecoming; Rankings from The Sports Network Poll released prior to the game; All times are in Eastern time
