= 2010 Samford Bulldogs football team =

American college football season

2010 Samford Bulldogs football
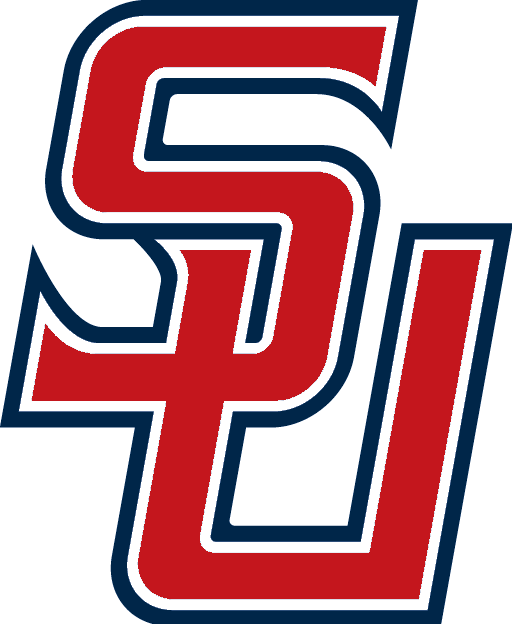
- Conference: Southern Conference
- Record: 4–7 (2–6 SoCon)
- Head coach: Pat Sullivan (4th season)
- Offensive coordinator: Steve Brickey (4th season)
- Defensive coordinator: Bill D'Ottavio (4th season)
- Home stadium: Seibert Stadium

2010 Southern Conference football standings
| | Conf. | | | Overall |
| Team | W | | L | W | | L |
|---|---|---|---|---|---|---|
| No. 4 Appalachian State +^ | 7 | – | 1 | 10 | – | 3 |
| No. 6 Wofford +^ | 7 | – | 1 | 10 | – | 3 |
| No. 5 Georgia Southern ^ | 5 | – | 3 | 10 | – | 5 |
| Chattanooga | 5 | – | 3 | 6 | – | 5 |
| Elon | 5 | – | 3 | 6 | – | 5 |
| Furman | 3 | – | 5 | 5 | – | 6 |
| Samford | 2 | – | 6 | 4 | – | 7 |
| The Citadel | 1 | – | 7 | 3 | – | 8 |
| Western Carolina | 1 | – | 7 | 2 | – | 9 |
+ – Conference co-champions; ^ – FCS playoff participant; Rankings from The Sports Network Poll

The 2010 Samford Bulldogs team represented Samford University in the 2010 NCAA Division I FCS football season. The Bulldogs were led by fourth-year head coach Pat Sullivan and played their home games at Seibert Stadium. They are a member of the Southern Conference. They finished the season 4–7, 2–6 in SoCon play to finish in seventh place.

== Schedule ==
| Date | Time | Opponent | Site | TV | Result | Attendance | Source |
|---|---|---|---|---|---|---|---|
| September 4 | 11:00 am | at No. 20 (FBS) Florida State* | Doak Campbell Stadium; Tallahassee, FL | ESPNU | L 6–59 | 68,438 | |
| September 11 | 5:00 pm | at Northwestern State* | Harry Turpin Stadium; Natchitoches, LA | | W 19–7 | 9,097 | |
| September 16 | 7:00 pm | Newberry* | Seibert Stadium; Homewood, AL | | W 38–35 | 5,451 | |
| September 25 | 2:00 pm | No. 2 Appalachian State | Seibert Stadium; Homewood, AL | | L 17–35 | 9,428 | |
| October 2 | 12:30 pm | at No. 21 Elon | Rhodes Stadium; Elon, NC | | L 19–24 | 10,476 | |
| October 9 | 2:00 pm | at Western Carolina | Bob Waters Field at E. J. Whitmire Stadium; Cullowhee, NC | | W 38–7 | 7,444 | |
| October 16 | 1:00 pm | Furman | Seibert Stadium; Homewood, AL | | L 10–17 | 7,218 | |
| October 30 | 1:00 pm | at Georgia Southern | Paulson Stadium; Statesboro, GA | | W 20–13 | 15,341 | |
| November 6 | 2:00 pm | No. 7 Wofford^{†} | Seibert Stadium; Homewood, AL | | L 3–10 | 7,563 | |
| November 13 | 1:00 pm | at Chattanooga | Finley Stadium; Chattanooga, TN | | L 14–48 | 9,207 | |
| November 20 | 1:00 pm | The Citadel | Seibert Stadium; Homewood, AL | | L 12–13 | 6,945 | |
*Non-conference game; ^{†}Homecoming; Rankings from The Sports Network Poll released prior to the game; All times are in Central time
