= 2010 Furman Paladins football team =

American college football season

2010 Furman Paladins football
- Conference: Southern Conference
- Record: 5–6 (3–5 SoCon)
- Head coach: Bobby Lamb (9th season)
- Defensive coordinator: Jeff Farrington (1st season)
- Captains: Adam Mims; Mike Brown; Kadarron Anderson; Ryan Steed
- Home stadium: Paladin Stadium

2010 Southern Conference football standings
	Conf.			Overall
Team	W		L	W		L
No. 4 Appalachian State +^	7	–	1	10	–	3
No. 6 Wofford +^	7	–	1	10	–	3
No. 5 Georgia Southern ^	5	–	3	10	–	5
Chattanooga	5	–	3	6	–	5
Elon	5	–	3	6	–	5
Furman	3	–	5	5	–	6
Samford	2	–	6	4	–	7
The Citadel	1	–	7	3	–	8
Western Carolina	1	–	7	2	–	9
+ – Conference co-champions; ^ – FCS playoff participant; Rankings from The Sports Network Poll

The 2010 Furman Paladins football team was an American football team that represented Furman University as a member of the Southern Conference (SoCon) during the 2010 NCAA Division I FCS football season. In their ninth year under head coach Bobby Lamb, the Paladins compiled an overall record of 5–6 with a conference mark of 3–5, finishing sixth in the SoCon.

== Schedule ==
Date	Opponent	Rank	Site	Result	Attendance	Source
September 11	No. 25 Colgate*		Paladin Stadium; Greenville, SC	W 45–15	10,284	
September 18	at No. 13 (FBS) South Carolina*	No. 24	Williams–Brice Stadium; Columbia, SC	L 19–38	73,681	
September 25	The Citadel	No. 23	Paladin Stadium; Greenville, SC (rivalry)	W 31–14	12,791	
October 2	at Wofford	No. 18	Gibbs Stadium; Spartanburg, SC (rivalry)	L 17–38	9,290	
October 9	Howard*		Paladin Stadium; Greenville, SC	W 56–15	9,239	
October 16	at Samford		Seibert Stadium; Homewood, AL	W 27–10	7,218	
October 23	No. 24 Chattanooga	No. 25	Paladin Stadium; Greenville, SC	L 28–36	10,394	
October 30	at No. 1 Appalachian State		Kidd Brewer Stadium; Boone, NC	L 26–37	29,093	
November 6	Western Carolina		Paladin Stadium; Greenville, SC	W 31–17	9,027	
November 13	at Elon		Rhodes Stadium; Elon, NC	L 25–30	6,174	
November 20	Georgia Southern		Paladin Stadium; Greenville, SC	L 28–32	11,781	
*Non-conference game; Rankings from The Sports Network Poll released prior to the game
