= Wazoo Sports Network =

- Broadcast area: Louisville & Lexington, Kentucky, Kentuckiana and Southern Indiana
- Headquarters: London, Kentucky

Programming
- Picture format: 480i SD

Ownership
- Owner: Wazoo Sports, Inc.

History
- Launched: 2009
- Closed: December 31, 2011

Links
- Website: http://www.wazoosports.com

Wazoo Sports Network was a regional sports network which specialized in airing local high school, college, and minor league sports mainly in the Kentuckiana and Bluegrass regions of Kentucky and southern Indiana, The network, which started out as online-only in December 2007, became a digital subchannel network in November 2009, but ended service at the end of 2011 due to Wazoo's parent company filing for bankruptcy.

On September 28, 2009, Wazoo Sports announced a partnership with Louisville ABC affiliate WHAS-TV to air the network on digital subchannel 11.3 starting on November 1; that November, an identical deal was reached with Lexington NBC affiliate WLEX-TV, which ran Wazoo Sports on subchannel 18.2. On August 1, 2010, the network added a third affiliate in Evansville, Indiana (near Henderson, Kentucky), as ABC affiliate WEHT added the network over subchannel 25.2 (replacing the Retro Television Network), though WEHT also incorporated some locally produced programming (primarily focused on the Indiana portion of the market), and thus branded the service as the News 25 Sports Channel (though Wazoo Sports branding was retained on programming provided by the network).

Wazoo Sports Network lost its three digital subchannel affiliations in December 2011. WEHT ended their affiliation (and subchannel 25.2 altogether) the evening of December 1, 2011 after that station's sale to Nexstar Broadcasting Group; Nexstar, by corporate edict, rarely maintained any subchannels at the time. WHAS-TV announced its disaffiliation from Wazoo Sports on December 18; the station's general manager later elaborated that the network "seems to have run its course for us." By December 27, WLEX-TV had also left Wazoo Sports and temporarily began carrying a local weather channel on 18.2 before joining Me-TV on December 31; the station felt that the network had not met WLEX's expectations. Wazoo Sports filed for Chapter 11 bankruptcy two days later. The network's website remained up until its domain registration expired, remaining in the same state it was in December 2011, along with their social media channels.

Variously Wazoo also offered other Kentucky High School Athletic Association-sanctioned high school sports broadcasts pertaining to local teams and state tourneys over a network of affiliates spread throughout Kentucky via syndication, and offered almost all of their high school programming via video on demand through the network's website.

Besides high school sports, programming of interest produced, aired in archive form, or part of a network Wazoo Sports was associated with included the following sports and teams;

- Minor league baseball
  - Lexington Legends
  - Louisville Bats
- College sports
  - Austin Peay State University
  - Eastern Kentucky University
  - University of Kentucky
  - University of Louisville
  - Morehead State University
  - Murray State University
  - Western Kentucky University
