= 2010 North Carolina Central Eagles football team =

American college football season

2010 North Carolina Central Eagles football
- Conference: Mid-Eastern Athletic Conference
- Record: 3–8 (0–0 MEAC)
- Head coach: Mose Rison (4th season; first 6 games); Darryl Bullock (interim, rest of the season)
- Home stadium: O'Kelly–Riddick Stadium

2010 Mid-Eastern Athletic Conference football standings
	Conf.			Overall
Team	W		L	W		L
No. 15 Bethune–Cookman +^	7	–	1	10	–	2
No. 16 South Carolina State +^	7	–	1	9	–	3
Florida A&M +	7	–	1	8	–	3
Hampton	5	–	3	6	–	5
Norfolk State	4	–	4	6	–	5
Morgan State	3	–	5	4	–	7
Delaware State	2	–	6	3	–	8
North Carolina A&T	1	–	7	1	–	10
Howard	0	–	8	1	–	10
North Carolina Central *	0	–	0	3	–	8
Savannah State *	0	–	0	1	–	10
+ – Conference co-champions; ^ – FCS playoff participant; * Not eligible for conference championship; Rankings from The Sports Network poll

The 2010 North Carolina Central Eagles football team represented North Carolina Central University as a member of the Mid-Eastern Athletic Conference (MEAC) during the 2010 NCAA Division I FCS football season. They were led by fourth-year head coach Mose Rison for the first six games before he was replaced by Darryl Bullock. This season was North Carolina Central's first year in the FCS and was also their first season in the Mid-Eastern Athletic Conference since 1979.
