= 2010 Savannah State Tigers football team =

American college football season

2010 Savannah State Tigers football
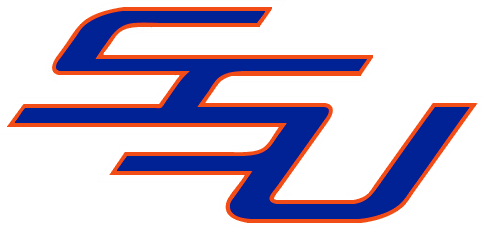
- Conference: MEAC
- Record: 1–10 ( MEAC)
- Head coach: Julius Dixon (interim) (1st season)
- Offensive coordinator: Alan Hall (1st season)
- Offensive scheme: Multiple
- Defensive coordinator: Julius Dixon (3rd season)
- Base defense: Base 4–3
- Home stadium: Ted Wright Stadium

2010 Mid-Eastern Athletic Conference football standings
	Conf.			Overall
Team	W		L	W		L
No. 15 Bethune–Cookman +^	7	–	1	10	–	2
No. 16 South Carolina State +^	7	–	1	9	–	3
Florida A&M +	7	–	1	8	–	3
Hampton	5	–	3	6	–	5
Norfolk State	4	–	4	6	–	5
Morgan State	3	–	5	4	–	7
Delaware State	2	–	6	3	–	8
North Carolina A&T	1	–	7	1	–	10
Howard	0	–	8	1	–	10
North Carolina Central *	0	–	0	3	–	8
Savannah State *	0	–	0	1	–	10
+ – Conference co-champions; ^ – FCS playoff participant; * Not eligible for conference championship; Rankings from The Sports Network poll

The 2010 Savannah State Tigers football team represented Savannah State University in American football. The Tigers were members of the NCAA Division I Football Championship Subdivision as a first year member of the Mid-Eastern Athletic Conference (MEAC).

The Tigers entered the 2010 season seeking its first winning season since joining Division I-AA in 2000. The Tigers ended the season with a 1–10 record. The Tigers last winning season was in 1998 as a member of the NCAA Division II.

== Season notes ==
=== Preseason notes ===
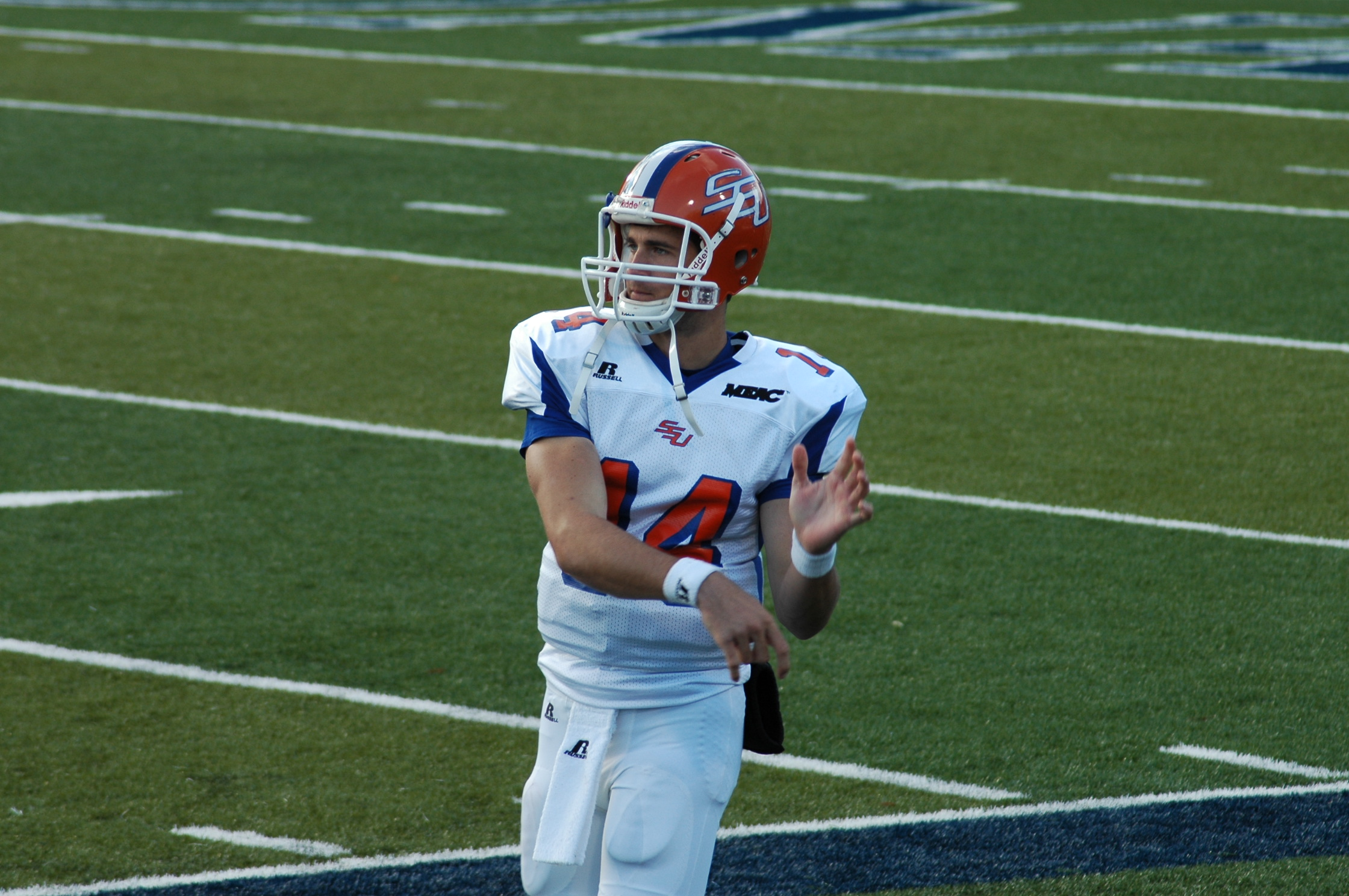
Sophomore quarterback A.J. Defillips warms up during the Savannah State vs. Old Dominion game. (Taken on November 6, 2010).

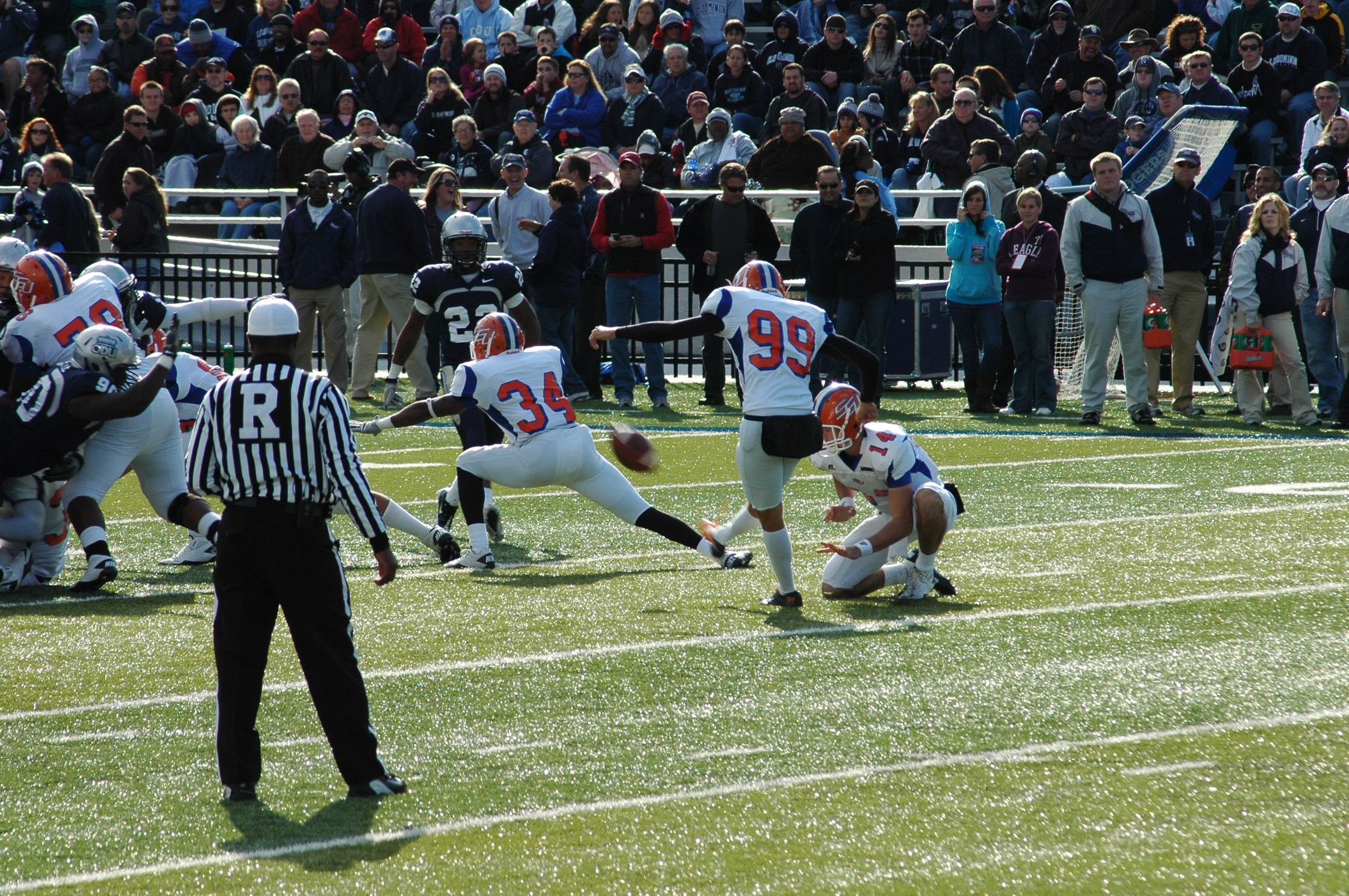
Kicker Derek Williams of Savannah State attempts a field goal against the Monarchs of Old Dominion University. (Taken on November 6, 2010).

- Head coach Robert "Robby" Wells announced the release of defensive line coach Allen Edwards. Edwards had coached SSU's defensive line since 2008.
- Robert "Robby" Wells resigns as head coach of the football team citing personal reasons. Defensive coordinator and defensive backs coach Julius Dixon is announced as interim head football coach.
- Thirteen players signed letters of intent to attend Savannah State University on February 3, 2010.

Name	Position	School	City, State
Sheldon Barnes	Running back	Bradwell Institute	Hinesville, Georgia
Bryce Bell	Offensive lineman	Martin Luther King High School	Lithonia, Georgia
Josh Coleman	Wide receiver	Brunswick High School	Brunswick, Georgia
Dylan Cook	Wide receiver	Hiram High School	Hiram, Georgia
Trent Demeritte	Wide receiver/defensive back	Winder-Barrow High School	Winder, Georgia
Darvean Herron	Linebacker	Bradwell Institute	Hinesville, Georgia
Dimitri Holmes	Wide receiver	Clarke Central High School	Athens, Georgia
Brian Lackey	Wide receiver	East Paulding High School	Dallas, Georgia
Patrick McCrary	Tight end	Madison County High School	Danielsville, Georgia
Malcolm Poindexter	Defensive back /Running back	Northgate High School	Newnan, Georgia
Anthony Prophet	Quarterback	Johnson High School	Gainesville, Georgia
Broderick Sellers	Linebacker	South Paulding High School	Douglasville, Georgia
Quan Trammell	Defensive back/Wide receiver	Stephens County High School	Toccoa, Georgia

- SSU sports information director Opio Mashariki confirmed on February 10, 2010 that assistant coach Jose Gonzalez resigned as linebackers coach on January 3, 2010.
- Spring practice was held between March 8 and April 12, 2010. During the first practice session 13 ineligible players and 20 players who quit the team or were dismissed did not participate.
- SSU announced on April 5 that it is moving its spring game to Sunday, April 11 at 2 p.m. at T.A. Wright Stadium. The game was originally scheduled to occur on April 10 at T.A. Wright Stadium.
- The Orange team defeated the Blue team, 18–6, in the annual Orange-Blue football scrimmage at T. A. Wright Stadium on April 11. Kicker Derek Williams kicked four field goals in the game for the Orange team. Vince Cochran returned a A.J. DeFillippis pass 49 yards for a touchdown for the Blue team. DeFillippis threw a 12-yard touchdown pass to Alakan Thomas but the extra point attempt was no good.
- Savannah State announced that camp would begin on August 5 with the first practice on August 7.
- Interim head coach Julius Dixon announced the hiring of Carl Funderburk, Corey McCloud and Dwayne Curry as assistant coaches.
- The Tigers 2009 wide receiver coach, Hans Batichon, left the coaching staff, after only one season.
- The team's second and final scrimmage of the preseason was held on August 25, 2010, at the SSU practice field. Junior quarterback A.J. DeFilippis threw two touchdown passes and ran for a touchdown to lead the Blue (offense) to a 34–0 victory over the Orange (defense).
- Justin Babb, Demetrius Edwards, LaDarien Redfield and Derek Williams were named to the Phil Steele Magazine 2010 Preseason All-Independent Football Team.
- Channing Welch, Demetrius Edwards, Justin Babb, and LaDarien Redfield were announced as team captains for the 2010 season.

== Schedule ==
Date	Time	Opponent	Site	Result	Attendance	Source
September 4	6:00 p.m.	at Georgia Southern*	Paulson Stadium; Statesboro, GA	L 3–48	20,430	
September 11	4:00 p.m.	at Fort Valley State*	Henderson Stadium; Macon, GA (Music City Classic)	L 10–41	4,182	
September 18	4:00 p.m.	at Bethune–Cookman*	Municipal Stadium; Daytona Beach, FL	L 7–42	2,510	
September 25	2:00 p.m.	at Albany State*	Waycross Memorial Stadium; Waycross, GA (Rumble in the Swamp)	L 14–28	9,273	
October 2	7:00 p.m.	at No. 25 Liberty*	Williams Stadium; Lynchburg, VA	L 14–52	19,314	
October 9	1:00 p.m.	at Georgia State*	Georgia Dome; Atlanta, GA	L 21–55	14,908	
October 16	3:00 p.m.	at Florida A&M*	Bragg Memorial Stadium; Tallahassee, FL	L 0–31	8,834	
October 23	1:00 p.m.	at Alabama State*	Cramton Bowl; Montgomery, AL	L 0–24	5,237	
November 6	2:00 p.m.	at Old Dominion*	Foreman Field; Norfolk, VA	L 9–57	19,782	
November 13	2:00 p.m.	North Carolina Central*	Memorial Stadium; Savannah, GA	W 28–21	3,518	
November 20	2:00 p.m.	Norfolk State*^{†}	Memorial Stadium; Savannah, GA	L 6–42	4,967	
*Non-conference game; ^{†}Homecoming; Rankings from The Sports Network Poll released prior to the game; All times are in Eastern time

== Coaches and support staff ==
Name	Type	College	Graduating year
	Head coach		
John W. Montgomery, II	Asst. head coach Offensive line coach	Oklahoma State	1976
Alan Hall	Offensive coordinator/quarterbacks coach		
Julius Dixon	Defensive coordinator Defensive backs coach	Furman	1990
	Running backs coach		
Carl Funderburk	Offensive line coach	Elon	1989
Barry Casterlin	Defensive line coach	South Carolina	2001
Corey G. McCloud	Assistant defensive line coach	Nicholls State	1997
	Wide receivers coach		
Eddie Johnson	Linebackers Coach / recruiting coordinator	Georgetown College	1993
Dwayne Curry	Assistant linebackers coach	Mississippi State	1997
Ken Tessier	Head Athletic Trainer	Endicott College	2002
Renee Mickey	Graduate Assistant / Athletic Trainer	UNC-Pembroke	2009

== Roster ==
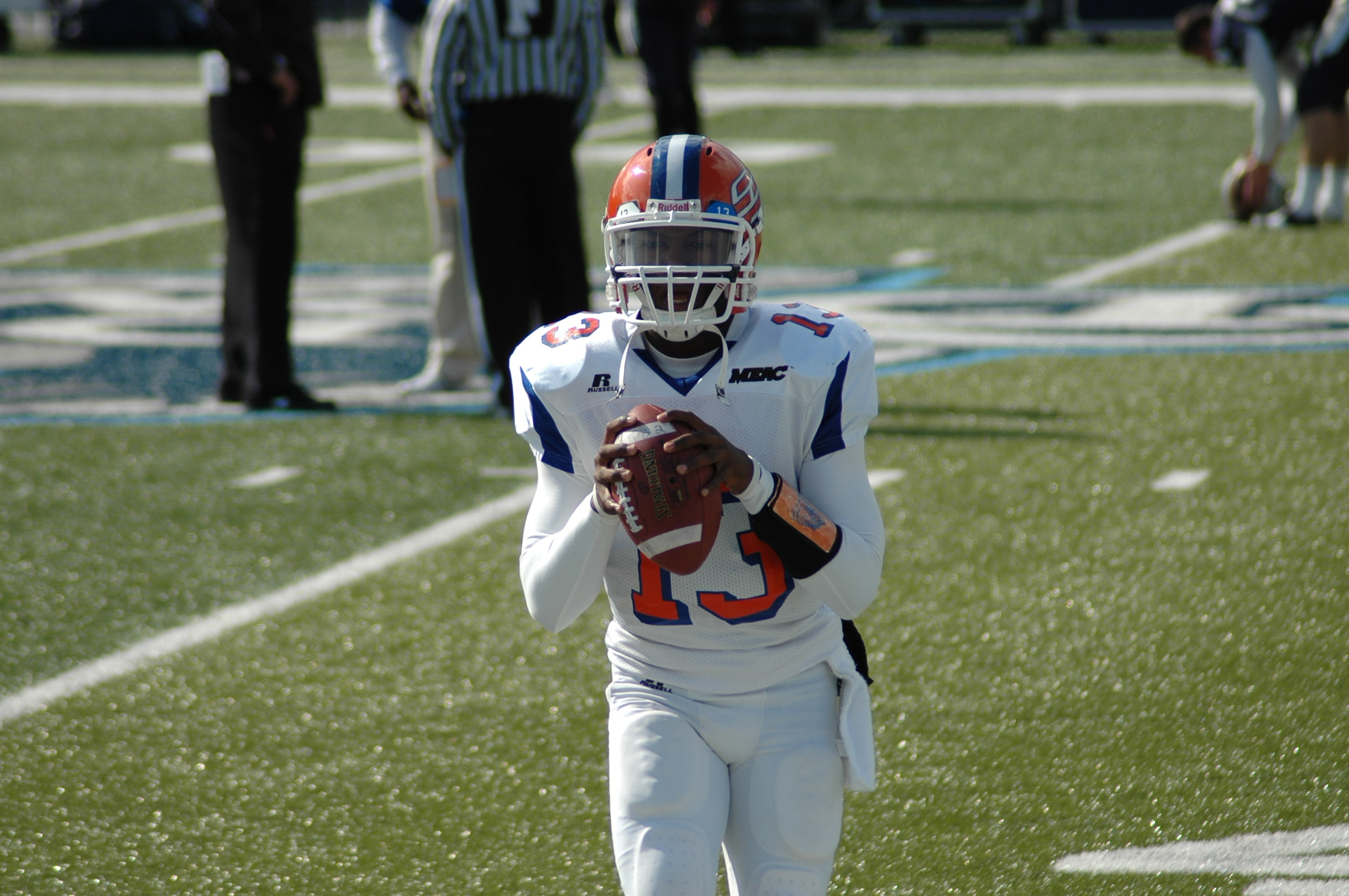
Freshman quarterback Antonio Bostic during warm up drills. (Taken November 6, 2010)

2010 Savannah State Tigers by position
Quarterbacks: 13 Antonio Bostic – Freshman; 14 Alfred Defilippis – Junior; 16 Avery Cheeks – Freshman; 17 Jake Durham – Freshman; 19 Anthony Prophet – Freshman; Running backs: 20 Justin Babb – Senior; 21 Sheldon Barnes – Freshman; 34 Daniel Heslop – Sophomore; 36 John Williams – Freshman; 40 Thomas Beaurem – Sophomore; 47 Brandon Best – Junior; 48 Malachi Youngblood – Junior; Wide receivers: 8 Simon Heyward – Freshman; 9 JaQuan Trammel – Freshman; 24 Antonio Proctor – Freshman; 26 Josh Coleman – Freshman; 43 Carnell Weston – Freshman; 80 Eric Washington Freshman; 81 Dylan Cook – Freshman; 82 Stefon Taylor – Senior; 83 Nathan Robinson – Junior; 84 Alakan Thomas – Junior; 85 Bryan Lackey – Freshman; 88 Trent Demeritte – Freshman; Tight ends: 5 Patrick McCrary – Freshman; 42 Lucas "Chris" Grile – Junior; 89 Chryston Floyd – Freshman; 91 Terrence Williams – Sophomore	Kickers / punters: 99 Derek Williams – Sophomore; Offensive line: 52 Terrence Williams – Sophomore; 59 Bryce Bell – Freshman; 62 Jared Brunson – Junior; 68 Thelmore Jackson – Sophomore; 70 Demetrius Edwards – Junior; 71 Lenworth McKenzie – Sophomore; 72 Darryl Harris – Freshman; 73 Cedric Brown – Freshman; 74 Jonathan Clowers – Freshman; 75 Warren Mason – Sophomore; 76 Dan Johnson – Senior; 77 Joseph Caldwell-Jones – Freshman; 78 Terrick Ransom – Sophomore; 79 David Larmond – Freshman; Defensive line: 46 Reginald Givens – Junior; 50 LaDarien Redfield – Junior; 55 Xavier Lewis – Sophomore; 57 Denzell Carter – Freshman; 67 Stephan Myers – Sophomore; 86 James Briscoe – Sophomore; 90 Chris McMullen – Sophomore; 93 Alex Wierzibicki – Freshman; 94 Channing Welch – Senior; 95 Eric Baker – Sophomore; 96 Timothy Wright – Sophomore; 97 Tametric Hunt – Junior	Linebackers: 12 Leland Russell – Sophomore; 31 Rashaud Ferrell – Linebacker; 32 Taylor Thompson – Freshman; 35 Sadrak JeanBaptiste – Sophomore; 41 Broderic Sellers – Freshman; 44 Darvean Herron – Freshman (redshirt); 45 J. Vince Cochran – Senior; 49 Michael Kuku – Junior; 52 Edwin Stevenson – Sophomore; 53 Nate Clay – Junior; 54 Dustin Russell – Sophomore; Defensive backs: 3 Cedric Chambers – Freshman; 7 Darren Hunter – Senior; 8 Patrick Thomas – Sophomore; 10 Justin Cooper – Sophomore; 11 Antonio Martin – Sophomore; 15 Deshawn Printup – Freshman; 18 Calvert Smith – Sophomore; 22 Richie Rucker – Junior; 23 Anthony Welch – Freshman; 25 Oscar Sims – Freshman; 27 Mathew Smith – Junior; 28 Jevonte Miller- Freshman; 29 Malcome Poindexter – Freshman; 30 Chris Asbury – Junior; 33 Khevin Sullivan – Sophomore; 37 Kyle Ashford – Freshman; 38 Lee Green – Sophomore

== Game summaries ==
=== Georgia Southern ===
Quarter	1	2	3	4	Total
Savannah State	0	0	3	0	3
Georgia Southern	10	17	7	14	48

at Paulson Stadium (Statesboro, Georgia)

- Game time: 6 p.m.
- Game weather: Sunny
- Game attendance: 20,430
- Referee: Steve Marlowe
- TV: None

The Tigers were held to 172 total yards of offense by the Eagles defenses en route to a 48–3 loss. Justin Babb led the Tigers offense with 70 yards rushing and three catches for 34 yards. Brian Lackey caught three passes for 37 total yards. Quarterback A.J. DeFilippis finished the game with 7 completions on 19 passes for 71 yards, but was rushed for −18 yards on the ground and was sacked three times by the Eagles. Redshirt freshman quarterback Antonio Bostick finished 1-of-4 passing for nine yards. The Tigers' defense was led by J. Vince Cochran with 13 tackles and Darren Hunter who added 12 tackles. On special teams, junior kicker Derek Williams hit a 31-yard field goal in the third quarter, but his 43-yard attempt with 3:19 to play in the game struck the right upright. He punted eight times for 267 yards (a 33.4-yard average), with 52 yards as his longest punt in the game. He averaged 64.5-yards with his two kickoffs (129 yards).

The Eagles scored on their first five possessions of the game and ended with 540 yards on offense.

=== Fort Valley State ===
Music City Classic

Quarter	1	2	3	4	Total
Fort Valley State	0	13	14	14	41
Savannah State	10	0	0	0	10

at Henderson Stadium, Macon, Georgia

- Game time: 4 p.m.
- Game attendance: 4,182

The Tigers took a 10–0 lead in the first quarter, but Fort Valley State scored 41 unanswered to beat Savannah State 41–10 in the Music City Classic. A crowd of 4,182 at Macon's Henderson Stadium watched as a 21-yard interception return for a touchdown by Cedric Chambers (4:18 into the game) and a 43-yard Derek Williams field goal gave the Tigers an early lead. However, the Tigers' offense continued to struggle only gaining 131 yards (60 yards rushing and 71 yards passing) with 3 interceptions and 2 lost fumbles on the day. The Tigers defense gave up 345 yards (143 yards rushing and 202 yards passing)

Domin Patterson returned two interceptions for touchdowns of 48 and 44 yards for the Wildcats.

=== Bethune-Cookman ===
Quarter	1	2	3	4	Total
Savannah State	7	0	0	0	7
Bethune-Cookman	7	14	7	14	42

at Municipal Stadium, Daytona Beach, Florida

- Game time: 4:05 p.m.
- Game weather: Partly Cloudy
- Game attendance: 2,510
- Referee: Darrell Davis

Bethune-Cookman quarterback Matt Johnson threw two touchdowns and ran for three touchdowns as the Wildcats beat Savannah State 42–7. The win was the 11th straight victory over the Tigers for Bethune Cookman and dropped the Tigers to 0–3 on the season. The Tigers only score came after a 17 play, 75-yard drive in 17 plays when running back Justin Babb scored on a 1-yard touchdown run late in the first quarter. Babb finished the game with 125 yards on 16 carries.

The Tigers offense could only generate four first downs and 100 total yards in the second half of the game. SSU quarterback AJ DeFilippis threw for 59 yards, but had two interceptions for SSU. Quarterback Antonio Bostic threw for 16 yards completing 4 of 4 passes and ran for 19 yards.

=== Albany State ===
Rumble in the Swamp

Quarter	1	2	3	4	Total
Savannah State	0	0	7	7	14
Albany State	7	14	7	0	28

at Waycross Memorial Stadium, Waycross, Georgia

- Game time: 2 p.m.
- Game weather: Sunny
- Game attendance: 9,273

The Rams of Albany State University defeated the Tigers, 28–14, in the inaugural Rumble in the Swamp Classic at Memorial Stadium in Waycross, Georgia. A crowd of 9,273 fans watched as the 16th ranked Rams. Freshman receiver Simon Heyward caught 10 passes in the game for 104 yards. Chris Asbury and J. Vince Cochran each had 11 tackles to lead the defense.

=== Liberty ===
Quarter	1	2	3	4	Total
Savannah State	7	0	7	0	14
Liberty	21	14	3	14	52

at Williams Stadium, Lynchburg, Virginia

- Game time: 7 p.m.
- Game weather: Mostly clear
- Game attendance: 19,314
- Referee: Tom McCreesh

The 25th ranked Flames of Liberty University defeated the Tigers 52–14 before a crowd of 19,314 at Williams Stadium in Lynchburg, Virginia. Antonio Bostic passed for 187 yards and 1 touchdown (a 32-yard pass to Brian Lackey). The Tigers only other score was a 22 yards return of a blocked punt by Rashaud Ferrell. Sheldon Barnes ran for 76 and Lackey caught 5 passes for 104 yards to lead the Tigers offense. Darren Hunter led the SSU defense with 11 tackles in the game.

=== Georgia State ===
Quarter	1	2	3	4	Total
Savannah State	0	7	7	7	21
Georgia State	14	20	7	14	55

at Georgia Dome, Atlanta, Georgia

- Game time: 1 p.m.
- Game weather: None (Domed Stadium)
- Game attendance: 14,908
- Referee: Bill Broadhurst

A Georgia Dome crowd of 14,908 fans watched as the Georgia State Panthers defeated the Tigers 55–21. SSU's Sheldon Barnes ran for 78 yards and quarterback Antonio Bostic passed for 95 yards. Simon Heyward was the leading receiver for the Tigers with six catches for 31 yards. Vince Coleman led the Tigers defense with eight tackles.

=== Florida A&M ===
Quarter	1	2	3	4	Total
Savannah State	0	0	0	0	0
Florida A&M	0	10	14	7	31

at Bragg Memorial Stadium, Tallahassee, Florida

- Game time: 3 p.m.
- Game weather: Sunny
- Game attendance: 8,834
- Referee: Clement Hall

Sheldon Barnes ran for 109 yards, but the Tigers were unable to score in a 31–0 loss to the Rattlers of FAMU. The Tigers defense held FAMU scoreless in the first quarter and the Rattlers held a 10–0 at lead at halftime, but the Tiger defense gave up three touchdowns in the second half. Starting quarterback Antonio Bostick threw for only 36 yards with Brian Lackey and Simon Heyward each catching three passes for 18 yards each. The loss kept the Tigers winless (0–7) and was the first shutout of the season.

=== Alabama State ===
Quarter	1	2	3	4	Total
Savannah State	0	0	0	0	0
Alabama State	0	7	7	10	24

at Cramton Bowl, Montgomery, Alabama

- Game time: 1 p.m.
- Game weather: Sunny
- Game attendance: 5,237
- Referee: Anthony Johnson

The Tigers suffered their eighth loss of the season and second straight shutout in a 24–0 loss to Alabama State. The Tigers trailed at halftime, 7–0, but gave up a touchdown in the third quarter and 10 points in the fourth quarter including a 59-yard interception touchdown return. Redshirt freshman quarterback Antonio Bostick passed for 92 yards and freshman wide receiver Simon Heyward caught 8 passes for 63 yards. Sheldon Barnes rushed for 80 yards. On defense, CJ Smith made a career-high 11 tackles in the game.

=== Old Dominion ===
Quarter	1	2	3	4	Total
Savannah State	0	9	0	0	9
Old Dominion	21	29	7	0	57

at Foreman Field, Norfolk, Virginia

- Game time: 2 p.m.
- Game weather: Cloudy
- Game attendance: 19,782
- Referee: Flemon Williams

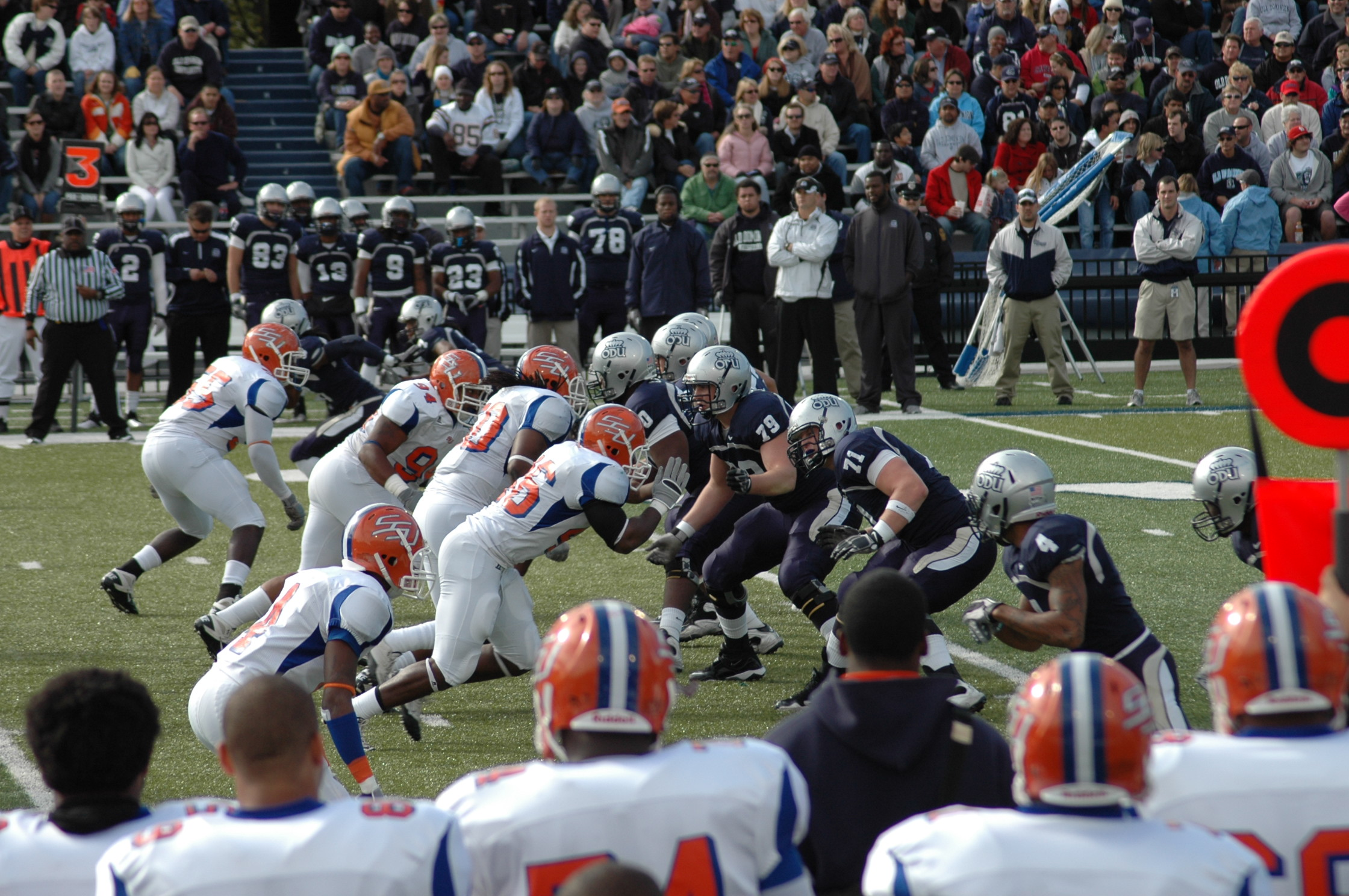
The Tigers on defense against the Monarchs during the first quarter. (November 6, 2010)

The Monarchs of Old Dominion University scored early and often en route to a 57–9 win over the Tigers in Norfolk, Virginia. The Monarchs scored 21 points in the first quarter and lead 50–9 at halftime. Quarterback Antonio Bostick scored on a one-yard touchdown run with 39 seconds left in the first half for the Tigers only touchdown of the game. Bostick threw for 127 total yards in the game, but was sacked four times by the Monarch's defense and threw one interception that was returned for a touchdown. Darren Hunter led the Tigers' defense with nine tackles.

=== North Carolina Central ===
Quarter	1	2	3	4	Total
NC Central	7	7	7	0	21
Savannah State	7	21	0	0	28

at Memorial Stadium, Savannah, Georgia

- Game time: 2 p.m.
- Game weather: Partly Cloudy
- Game attendance: 3,518
- Referee: Clement Hall

The Tigers ended their losing streak at 11 games by defeating the Eagles of North Carolina Central at Memorial Stadium. A crowd of 3,518 for the team's first victory this season. Running back Sheldon Barnes rushed for a career-high 120 yards. Redshirt freshman quarterback Antonio Bostick passed for 78 yards and one touchdown while sophomore quarterback AJ DeFilippis threw for 43 yards and one touchdown. On defense for the Tigers, Michael Kuku had 10 tackles and recovered a fumble.

=== Norfolk State ===
Quarter	1	2	3	4	Total
Norfolk State	14	7	7	14	42
Savannah State	0	0	3	3	6

at Memorial Stadium, Savannah, Georgia

- Game time: 2 p.m.
- Game weather: Partly Cloudy
- Game attendance: 4,967
- Referee: Preston Harding

The Tigers ended the 2010 season at home with a loss to the Spartans of Norfolk State University. The 4,967 fans at Memorial Stadium saw the Spartans rolled up 579 yards of offense, including 233 yards and three touchdowns by De Angelo Branche, during the game. SSU's only point in the game were scored on two field goals of 47 and 35 yards by kicker Derek Williams. Quarterback Antonio Bostick threw for 54 yards and Antonio Proctor rushed for 68 yards to lead the Tigers offense. Broderick Sellars led the Tigers defense with 16 tackles.

== Statistics ==
Current as of November 27, 2010 – All Games

=== Team ===
	Team	Opp
Scoring	112	441
Points per game	10.2	40.1
First downs	141	242
Rushing	75	135
Passing	52	96
Penalty	14	11
Total offense	2,484	4,991
Avg per play	3.8	6.8
Avg per game	225.8	453.7
Fumbles-Lost	21–9	17–10
Penalties-Yards	74–563	107.908
Avg per game	51.2	82.5

	Team	Opp
Punts-Yards	78–2,774	35–1,317
Avg per punt	35.6	37.6
Time of possession/Game	29.24	30:36
3rd down conversions	45 of 158 (28%)	58 of 129 (45%)
4th down conversions	4 of 13 (31%)	8 of 18 (44%)
Touchdowns scored	14	59
Field goals-Attempts	5–10	9–16
PAT-Attempts	13–14 (93%)	58–58 (100%)
Attendance	8,485	94,376
Games / Avg per Game	2 / 4,242	7 / 13,482

==== Scores by quarter ====
	1	2	3	4	Total
Savannah State	31	37	27	17	112
Opponents	101	152	87	101	441

== Media ==
Radio flagship: WHCJ
Broadcasters: Steve Richards (play-by-play), Curtis Foster (analyst)
