= 2010 Old Dominion Monarchs football team =

American college football season

2010 Old Dominion Monarchs football
- Conference: Independent
- Record: 8–3
- Head coach: Bobby Wilder (2nd season)
- Offensive coordinator: Brian Scott (2nd season)
- Offensive scheme: Hurry-up spread option
- Defensive coordinator: Andy Rondeau (2nd season)
- Base defense: 3–4
- Home stadium: Foreman Field at S. B. Ballard Stadium

2010 NCAA Division I FCS independents football standings
	Conf.			Overall
Team	W		L	W		L
Old Dominion		–		8	–	3
Georgia State		–		6	–	5
Lamar		–		5	–	6

The 2010 Old Dominion Monarchs football team represented Old Dominion University during the 2010 NCAA Division I FCS football season. The team compiled an 8–3 record, in their second season under head coach Bobby Wilder. The Monarchs competed as an independent. The team's home games were held at Foreman Field.

== Schedule ==
Date	Time	Opponent	Site	TV	Result	Attendance	Source
September 4	6:00 p.m.	Jacksonville	Foreman Field; Norfolk, VA		L 25–35	19,782	
September 11	1:00 p.m.	at Campbell	Barker–Lane Stadium; Buies Creek, NC		W 44–13	5,462	
September 18	7:00 p.m.	No. 12 William & Mary	Foreman Field; Norfolk, VA (rivalry)	CSN-MA	L 17–21	19,782	
September 25	1:00 p.m.	at Monmouth	Kessler Field; West Long Branch, NJ		W 35–21	1,580	
October 2	6:00 p.m.	Gardner–Webb	Foreman Field; Norfolk, VA		W 14–7	19,782	
October 9	3:00 p.m.	No. 16 Cal Poly	Foreman Field; Norfolk, VA		L 37–50	19,782	
October 23	3:30 p.m.	Georgia State^{†}	Foreman Field; Norfolk, VA	Cox, Comcast	W 34–20	19,782	
October 30	1:00 p.m.	at Hampton	Armstrong Stadium; Hampton, VA		W 28–14	8,605	
November 6	2:00 p.m.	Savannah State	Foreman Field; Norfolk, VA		W 57–9	19,782	
November 13	3:30 p.m.	VMI	Foreman Field; Norfolk, VA	Cox, Comcast	W 45–28	19,782	
November 20	2:00 p.m.	at North Carolina Central	O'Kelly–Riddick Stadium; Durham, NC		W 33–21	4,107	
^{†}Homecoming; Rankings from The Sports Network Poll released prior to the game; All times are in Eastern time
