= Henderson Stadium =

Henderson Stadium may refer to:

- Spitz Stadium or Henderson Stadium, a stadium in Lethbridge, Alberta, Canada
- Henderson Stadium (Macon, Georgia), a stadium in Macon, Georgia, U.S.
- Henderson Stadium (Alcorn State), a stadium in Lorman, Mississippi, U.S.
