= 2010 Georgia State Panthers football team =

American college football season

2010 Georgia State Panthers football
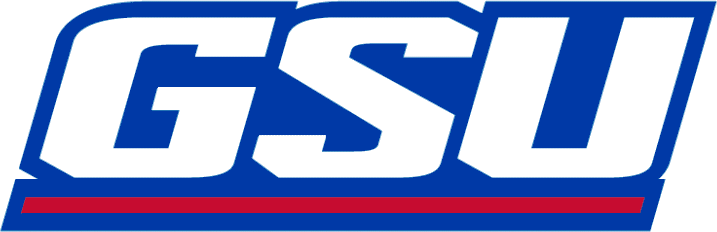
- Conference: Independent
- Record: 6–5
- Head coach: Bill Curry (1st season)
- Offensive coordinator: John Bond (1st season)
- Offensive scheme: Spread option
- Defensive coordinator: John Thompson (1st season)
- Base defense: 3–4
- Home stadium: Georgia Dome

2010 NCAA Division I FCS independents football standings
	Conf.			Overall
Team	W		L	W		L
Old Dominion		–		8	–	3
Georgia State		–		6	–	5
Lamar		–		5	–	6

The 2010 Georgia State Panthers football team represented Georgia State University during the 2010 NCAA Division I FCS football season. Georgia State played their first-ever season of football in 2010 and were classified as an independent school, meaning they had no athletic conference affiliation. Bill Curry guided the new program's team to a 6–5 record, while all of their home games were played in the Georgia Dome.

The team's first official practice took place on August 14, 2009, and the team played its first official public spring scrimmage at the Georgia Dome on April 10, 2010, before 3,192 fans. The Panthers played their first football game at home (the Georgia Dome) on September 2, 2010, against Shorter University (Mid-South Conference) (NAIA). In front of a crowd of 30,237 the Panthers won the game 41-7.

The Panthers football program gained national exposure when it played 10th ranked Alabama of the FBS on November 18. Over 100,000 people attended the game held in Bryant–Denny Stadium in Tuscaloosa, and it was broadcast live on the ESPNU television network. Georgia State lost the game 63–7.

== Schedule ==
Date	Time	Opponent	Site	TV	Result	Attendance
September 2	7:30 p.m.	Shorter	Georgia Dome; Atlanta, GA		W 41–7	30,237
September 11	1:00 p.m.	No. 7 (NAIA) Lambuth	Georgia Dome; Atlanta, GA		L 14–23	12,647
September 18	1:00 p.m.	No. 4 Jacksonville State	Georgia Dome; Atlanta, GA	CSS	L 27–34 ^{OT}	16,128
September 25	1:00 p.m.	at Campbell	Barker–Lane Stadium; Buies Creek, NC		W 24–21	3,021
October 2	1:00 p.m.	Morehead State^{†}	Georgia Dome; Atlanta, GA	CSS	W 37–10	15,264
October 9	1:00 p.m.	Savannah State	Georgia Dome; Atlanta, GA		W 55–21	14,908
October 16	1:00 p.m.	North Carolina Central	Georgia Dome; Atlanta, GA		W 20–17 ^{OT}	13,378
October 23	3:30 p.m.	at Old Dominion	Foreman Field; Norfolk, VA	Comcast	L 20–34	19,782
October 30	5:00 p.m.	at South Alabama	Ladd–Peebles Stadium; Mobile, AL		L 34–39	23,446
November 6	1:00 p.m.	Lamar	Georgia Dome; Atlanta, GA		W 23–17	14,689
November 18	7:30 p.m.	at No. 10 (FBS) Alabama	Bryant–Denny Stadium; Tuscaloosa, AL	ESPNU	L 7–63	101,821
^{†}Homecoming; Rankings from The Sports Network Poll released prior to the game; All times are in Eastern time

== Personnel ==
2010 Georgia State Panthers football team roster
Players
Coaches
Offense

Pos.	#	Name	Class
WR	1	Nate Anthony	Fr
QB	2	Star Jackson	So
RB	3	Rosevelt Watson	So
QB	4	Kelton Hill	Fr
WR	6	Darren McCray	Fr
RB	7	Parris Lee	Fr
WR	8	Jordan Giles	Fr
QB	11	Drew Little	Fr
WR	12	Bo Schlechter	Fr
WR	15	Albert Wilson	Fr
WR	17	Danny Williams	Fr
WR	19	Sidney Haynes	Jr
RB	21	Travis Evans	Fr
RB	28	Malcolm Smith	So
RB	39	Rendell Wilder	Fr
RB	44	Sam Burkhalter	Fr
TE	48	Bailey Woods	Jr
C	50	Tim Wynn	Fr
OT	56	Ulrick John	Fr
G	60	Cade Yates	Fr
C	62	Ben Jacoby	Jr
OL	63	Jacob Couch	Fr
OT	64	Keivn Thompson	So
OL	65	Ronald Martin	Fr
G	66	Nick Nesmith	Fr
G	68	Michael Davis	Fr
G	69	Kam Cheathem	Fr
OT	70	Ramell Davis	Fr
G	71	Joseph Gilbert	Jr
G	72	Harrison Clottey	Fr
OL	73	Gabriel Hampton	Jr
OL	74	Jon Marshall Sauls	Fr
G	76	Ladeven Kirkland	Jr
OT	78	Clyde Yandell	Jr
OT	79	Grant King	Fr
WR	81	Brett Beidel	Fr
WR	82	Zach Jones	Fr
WR	83	Bo Carter	Fr
TE	84	Arthur Williams	Jr
WR	86	Isaiah Ervin	Jr
TE	88	Emmanuel Ogbuehi	So
TE	89	Drew Pearson	Fr
WR		Charles Borowsky	Sr
RB		Tyronne Brown	Fr
WR		Cedric Green	So
WR		Jabrill Hightower	So
WR		Joshua Jackson	So
WR		Franck Pierre-Louis	Sr

Defense

Pos.	#	Name	Class
CB	5	Demarius Matthews	Fr
CB	9	Brent McClendon	Fr
OLB	10	Robert Ferguson	Fr
ILB	13	Evan Bostic	Jr
CB	14	Jocquez Fears	Jr
CB	16	Justin Hughes	Fr
OLB	18	Blake Wyatt	Fr
S	20	Brandon Jones	Jr
CB	22	Isaiah Howard	Fr
OLB	23	Mark Hogan	Fr
S	24	Fred Barnes	Fr
ILB	25	Cole Moon	Fr
CB	26	Jamal Ransby	Fr
CB	27	Mark Collins	Fr
CB	29	Rodriguez Price	Fr
CB	30	Tay Watts	So
OLB	32	Allen McKay	Fr
OLB	33	Brad Chahoy	So
S	34	Hubert Davis	Sr
OLB	35	Jake Muasau	Jr
ILB	36	Kail Singleton	Fr
OLB	37	Akeen Felder	So
ILB	38	Louie Muasau	Jr
ILB	41	Olufemi Opanubi	Jr
OLB	42	Cliff Ibarrondo	So
DE	45	Austin Wiley	Fr
OLB	46	Jarrell Robinson	Fr
S	47	Michael Hall	Jr
ILB	51	Trey Ennis	Sr
ILB	52	Davis Knowles	Fr
DT	53	Christo Bilukidi	Jr
DT	57	Robert Truitt	Fr
OLB	58	Brandon Berry	So
DT	59	Travis Lee	Fr
NG	75	Terrance Woodard	Fr
OLB	77	C. J. Stephens	Fr
ILB	85	Blake James	Fr
DT	90	Khiry Karriem	Jr
NG	91	Eduardo Curry	Fr
NG	92	Dion Peary	Jr
DE	93	Alex Findura	Fr
DE	94	Kalen Jenkins	Jr
DL	95	Deron Rhodes	Fr
NG	98	Deron Jordan	So
DE	99	Demetreious Shorter	Fr
DB		Jaquies Jackson	So
DB		Jamaal May	Fr
DB		Wayne Parker	Fr
DL		Marcus Stetzer	Fr
DB		Mitchell Vinson	Jr

Special teams

Pos.	#	Name	Class
P	12	Bo Schlechter	Fr
P	40	Brandon Lupo	Sr
K	43	Max Garcia	So
LS	54	Scott McQueen	Fr
K	80	Joseph Schneider	Fr
P	96	Michael Donovan	Jr
K	97	Iain Vance	Sr

Head coach

- Bill Curry

Coordinators/assistant coaches

- John Bond
  Offensive coordinator/quarterbacks
- John Thompson
  Defensive coordinator
- George Pugh
  Wide receivers
- Jason French
  Outside linebackers
- Craig Harmon
  Tight ends
- Anthony Midget
  Special teams coordinator/defensive backs
- Todd Perry
  Running backs
- Mike Riddle
  Offensive line
- Chris Ward
  Defensive line
- Ryan Zimmerman
  Kickers/specialists

Legend

- (C) Team captain
- (S) Suspended
- (I) Ineligible
- Injured
- Redshirt

Roster
Last update: October 6, 2024

== Game summaries ==
=== Shorter ===
Shorter Hawks at Georgia State Panthers – Game summary

Quarter	1	2	3	4	Total
Hawks	0	0	0	7	7
Panthers	7	13	7	14	41

at Georgia Dome, Atlanta, Georgia

- Date: September 2
- Game time: 7:30 p.m. EDT
- Game weather: None (played indoors)
- Game attendance: 30,237
- Referee: Herbert Stayton
- Box score, Recap

Game information
First quarter
- GAST – Parris Lee 4-yard run (Iain Vance kick), 9:07. Panthers 7–0. Drive: 11 plays, 63 yards, 5:53.

Second quarter

- GAST – Iain Vance 22-yard field goal, 8:58. Panthers 10–0. Drive: 10 plays, 59 yards, 5:13.
- GAST – Emmanuel Ogbuehi 4-yard pass from Drew Little (Iain Vance kick), 5:48. Panthers 17–0. Drive: 5 plays, 30 yards, 2:23.
- GAST – Iain Vance 18-yard field goal, 0:16. Panthers 20–0. Drive: 7 plays, 29 yards, 3:37.

Third quarter

- GAST – Parris Lee 10-yard run (Iain Vance kick), 2:12. Panthers 27–0. Drive: 6 plays, 60 yards, 2:13.

Fourth quarter

- SHO – Ben Williams 1-yard run (David Guilford kick), 8:14. Panthers 27–7. Drive: 17 plays, 80 yards, 8:58.
- GAST – Jordan Giles 16-yard pass from Drew Little (Iain Vance kick), 5:35. Panthers 34–7. Drive: 6 plays, 47 yards, 2:29.
- GAST – Kelton Hill 24-yard run (Iain Vance kick), 0:08. Panthers 41–7. Drive: 4 plays, 54 yards, 1:55.

Statistics	SHO	GAST
First downs	14	20
Total yards	263	366
Rushing yards	206	212
Passing yards	57	154
Turnovers	1	0
Time of possession	32:29	27:31

Team	Category	Player	Statistics
Shorter	Passing	Ben Williams	5/11, 57 yards
Shorter	Rushing	Ben Williams	26 rushes, 94 yards, TD
Shorter	Receiving	Brandon Morten	1 reception, 20 yards
Georgia State	Passing	Drew Little	13/17, 135 yards, 2 TD
Georgia State	Rushing	Parris Lee	8 rushes, 64 yards, 2 TD
Georgia State	Receiving	Jordan Giles	3 receptions, 53 yards, TD

=== No. 7 (NAIA) Lambuth ===
No. 7 (NAIA) Lambuth Eagles at Georgia State Panthers – Game summary

Quarter	1	2	3	4	Total
No. 7 (NAIA) Eagles	6	3	0	14	23
Panthers	0	0	14	0	14

at Georgia Dome, Atlanta, Georgia

- Date: September 11
- Game time: 1:00 p.m. EDT
- Game weather: None (played indoors)
- Game attendance: 12,647
- Referee: Jack Winter
- Box score, Recap

Game information
First quarter
- LAM – Marquis Williams 23-yard run (kick failed), 9:39. Eagles 6–0. Drive: 10 plays, 70 yards, 5:21.

Second quarter

- LAM – Nate O'jibway 42-yard field goal, 2:20. Eagles 9–0. Drive: 13 plays, 55 yards, 5:48.

Third quarter

- GAST – Travis Evans 2-yard run (Iain Vance kick), 8:12. Eagles 9–7. Drive: 5 plays, 52 yards, 2:04.
- GAST – Danny Williams 39-yard pass from Rosevelt Watson (Iain Vance kick), 0:06. Panthers 14–9. Drive: 4 plays, 77 yards, 1:46.

Fourth quarter

- LAM – B. A. Davis 4-yard run (Nate O'jibway kick), 2:27. Eagles 16–14. Drive: 17 plays, 69 yards, 8:21.
- LAM – Darius Buckley 37-yard interception return (Nate O'jibway kick), 2:09. Eagles 23–14.

Statistics	LAM	GAST
First downs	21	5
Total yards	310	183
Rushing yards	184	91
Passing yards	126	92
Turnovers	2	4
Time of possession	42:02	17:58

Team	Category	Player	Statistics
Lambuth	Passing	David Ingram	19/25, 126 yards
Lambuth	Rushing	Marquis Williams	17 rushes, 149 yards, TD
Lambuth	Receiving	Rod Jefferson	8 receptions, 65 yards
Georgia State	Passing	Rosevelt Watson	1/1, 39 yards, TD
Georgia State	Rushing	Kelton Hill	5 rushes, 64 yards
Georgia State	Receiving	Danny Williams	2 receptions, 44 yards, TD

=== No. 4 Jacksonville State ===
No. 4 Jacksonville State Gamecocks at Georgia State Panthers – Game summary

Quarter	1	2	3	4	OT	Total
No. 4 Gamecocks	3	14	3	7	7	34
Panthers	7	3	3	14	0	27

at Georgia Dome, Atlanta, Georgia

- Date: September 18
- Game time: 1:00 p.m. EDT
- Game weather: None (played indoors)
- Game attendance: 16,128
- Referee: Mike Sechrist
- Box score, Recap

Game information
First quarter
- JVST – James Esco 20-yard field goal, 7:57. Gamecocks 3–0. Drive: 13 plays, 69 yards, 7:03.
- GAST – Darren McCray 41-yard run (Iain Vance kick), 6:23. Panthers 7–3. Drive: 3 plays, 56 yards, 1:26.

Second quarter

- JVST – Jamal Young 4-yard pass from Marques Ivory (James Esco kick), 14:54. Gamecocks 10–7. Drive: 11 plays, 82 yards, 6:23.
- GAST – Iain Vance 39-yard field goal, 10:38. Tied 10–10. Drive: 8 plays, 39 yards, 4:16.
- JVST – Coty Blanchard 4-yard run (James Esco kick), 0:50. Gamecocks 17–10. Drive: 7 plays, 49 yards, 1:13.

Third quarter

- GAST – Iain Vance 25-yard field goal, 8:34. Gamecocks 17–13. Drive: 14 plays, 77 yards, 5:51.
- JVST – James Esco 27-yard field goal, 0:12. Gamecocks 20–13. Drive: 7 plays, 21 yards, 3:21.

Fourth quarter

- GAST – Travis Evans 46-yard run (Iain Vance kick), 13:26. Tied 20–20. Drive: 5 plays, 69 yards, 1:40.
- JVST – Darius Barksdale 1-yard run (James Esco kick), 9:38. Gamecocks 27–20. Drive: 9 plays, 69 yards, 3:42.
- GAST – Drew Little 1-yard run (Iain Vance kick), 3:57. Tied 27–27. Drive: 13 plays, 75 yards, 5:29.

Overtime

- JVST – Marques Ivory 2-yard run (James Esco kick). Gamecocks 34–27. Drive: 4 plays, 25 yards.

Statistics	JVST	GAST
First downs	24	19
Total yards	450	339
Rushing yards	167	112
Passing yards	283	227
Turnovers	1	1
Time of possession	33:09	26:51

Team	Category	Player	Statistics
Jacksonville State	Passing	Marques Ivory	24/32, 283 yards, TD
Jacksonville State	Rushing	Jamal Young	9 rushes, 64 yards
Jacksonville State	Receiving	John Whiddon	6 receptions, 69 yards
Georgia State	Passing	Drew Little	25/38, 227 yards, INT
Georgia State	Rushing	Travis Evans	7 rushes, 54 yards, TD
Georgia State	Receiving	Danny Williams	7 receptions, 78 yards

=== At Campbell ===
Georgia State Panthers at Campbell Fighting Camels – Game summary

Quarter	1	2	3	4	Total
Panthers	14	0	0	10	24
Fighting Camels	7	7	0	7	21

at Barker–Lane Stadium, Buies Creek, North Carolina

- Date: September 25
- Game time: 1:00 p.m. EDT
- Game weather: Sunny, 96 °F (36 °C)
- Game attendance: 3,021
- Referee: Duane Heydt
- Box score, Recap

Game information
First quarter
- GAST – Darren McCray 96-yard kickoff return (Iain Vance kick), 14:46. Panthers 7–0.
- CAMP – Daniel Polk 1-yard run (Adam Willets kick), 9:47. Tied 7–7. Drive: 5 plays, 17 yards, 2:28.
- GAST – Sidney Haynes 5-yard pass from Drew Little (Iain Vance kick), 4:06. Panthers 14–7. Drive: 10 plays, 51 yards, 5:36.

Second quarter

- CAMP – Harrison Jordan 18-yard pass from Daniel Polk (Adam Willets kick), 1:31. Tied 14–14. Drive: 10 plays, 94 yards, 5:30.

Third quarter

- No scoring plays

Fourth quarter

- GAST – Danny Williams 8-yard pass from Drew Little (Iain Vance kick), 6:11. Panthers 21–14. Drive: 13 plays, 80 yards, 6:15.
- CAMP – Daniel Polk 7-yard run (Sam Eberwein kick), 3:14. Tied 21–21. Drive: 6 plays, 64 yards, 2:53.
- GAST – Iain Vance 30-yard field goal, 0:01. Panthers 24–21. Drive: 10 plays, 63 yards, 3:06.

Statistics	GAST	CAMP
First downs	14	21
Total yards	280	341
Rushing yards	117	257
Passing yards	163	84
Turnovers	3	1
Time of possession	22:33	37:27

Team	Category	Player	Statistics
Georgia State	Passing	Drew Little	16/23, 163 yards, 2 TD
Georgia State	Rushing	Travis Evans	11 rushes, 53 yards
Georgia State	Receiving	Albert Wilson	1 reception, 54 yards
Campbell	Passing	Daniel Polk	9/18, 84 yards, TD, INT
Campbell	Rushing	Rashaun Brown	19 rushes, 133 yards
Campbell	Receiving	Harrison Jordan	3 receptions, 40 yards, TD

=== Morehead State ===
Morehead State Eagles at Georgia State Panthers – Game summary

Quarter	1	2	3	4	Total
Eagles	3	0	0	7	10
Panthers	14	16	7	0	37

at Georgia Dome, Atlanta, Georgia

- Date: October 2
- Game time: 1:00 p.m. EDT
- Game weather: None (played indoors)
- Game attendance: 15,264
- Referee: Kelvin Hudson
- Box score, Recap

Game information
First quarter
- GAST – Jordan Giles 6-yard pass from Drew Little (Iain Vance kick), 9:33. Panthers 7–0. Drive: 8 plays, 56 yards, 3:55.
- GAST – Parris Lee 4-yard run (Iain Vance kick), 7:27. Panthers 14–0. Drive: 3 plays, 57 yards, 1:05.
- MORE – Rainer Duzan 27-yard field goal, 2:12. Panthers 14–3. Drive: 6 plays, 13 yards, 2:44.

Second quarter

- GAST – Iain Vance 49-yard field goal, 7:55. Panthers 17–3. Drive: 4 plays, 3 yards, 0:54.
- GAST – Arthur Williams 11-yard pass from Drew Little (kick failed), 3:29. Panthers 23–3. Drive: 2 plays, 31 yards, 0:35.
- GAST – Sidney Haynes 12-yard pass from Drew Little (Iain Vance kick), 0:17. Panthers 30–3. Drive: 9 plays, 73 yards, 2:11.

Third quarter

- GAST – Arthur Williams 2-yard pass from Drew Little (Iain Vance kick), 7:47. Panthers 37–3. Drive: 7 plays, 69 yards, 3:06.

Fourth quarter

- MORE – Jais Yoshimura 23-yard pass from Zach Lewis (Rainer Duzan kick), 11:20. Panthers 37–10. Drive: 9 plays, 80 yards, 3:40.

Statistics	MORE	GAST
First downs	14	22
Total yards	280	441
Rushing yards	50	152
Passing yards	230	289
Turnovers	4	3
Time of possession	27:31	32:25

Team	Category	Player	Statistics
Morehead State	Passing	Zach Lewis	27/44, 230 yards, TD, 2 INT
Morehead State	Rushing	Desmond Cox	12 rushes, 38 yards
Morehead State	Receiving	Ronn McDermott	9 receptions, 79 yards
Georgia State	Passing	Drew Little	21/29, 287 yards, 4 TD
Georgia State	Rushing	Travis Evans	8 rushes, 62 yards
Georgia State	Receiving	Danny Williams	8 receptions, 101 yards

=== Savannah State ===
Savannah State Tigers at Georgia State Panthers – Game summary

Quarter	1	2	3	4	Total
Tigers	0	7	7	7	21
Panthers	14	20	7	14	55

at Georgia Dome, Atlanta, Georgia

- Date: October 9
- Game time: 1:00 p.m. EDT
- Game weather: None (played indoors)
- Game attendance: 14,908
- Referee: Tony Marcella
- Box score, Recap

Game information
First quarter
- GAST – Parris Lee 4-yard run (Iain Vance kick), 8:25. Panthers 7–0. Drive: 5 plays, 19 yards, 2:23.
- GAST – Sam Burkhalter 9-yard pass from Drew Little (Iain Vance kick), 6:58. Panthers 14–0. Drive: 3 plays, 21 yards, 1:12.

Second quarter

- SAV – Sheldon Barnes 1-yard run (Derek Williams kick), 13:39. Panthers 14–7. Drive: 10 plays, 53 yards, 4:25.
- GAST – Iain Vance 46-yard field goal, 10:38. Panthers 17–7. Drive: 9 plays, 30 yards, 2:52.
- GAST – Danny Williams 7-yard pass from Drew Little (Iain Vance kick), 3:55. Panthers 24–7. Drive: 8 plays, 67 yards, 3:56.
- GAST – Iain Vance 27-yard field goal, 2:47. Panthers 27–7. Drive: 4 plays, -2 yards, 0:55.
- GAST – Albert Wilson 29-yard pass from Drew Little (Iain Vance kick), 0:20. Panthers 34–7. Drive: 5 plays, 77 yards, 0:48.

Third quarter

- GAST – Albert Wilson 28-yard pass from Drew Little (Iain Vance kick), 11:06. Panthers 41–7. Drive: 8 plays, 57 yards, 3:44.
- SAV – Brian Lackey 38-yard pass from Antonio Bostick (Derek Williams kick), 0:25. Panthers 41–14. Drive: 15 plays, 94 yards, 6:29.

Fourth quarter

- GAST – Sam Burkhalter 1-yard run (Iain Vance kick), 9:21. Panthers 48–14. Drive: 12 plays, 68 yards, 5:58.
- SAV – Sheldon Barnes 1-yard run (Derek Williams kick), 3:10. Panthers 48–21. Drive: 12 plays, 71 yards, 6:10.
- GAST – Kelton Hill 8-yard run (Iain Vance kick), 0:44. Panthers 55–21. Drive: 6 plays, 64 yards, 2:18.

Statistics	SAV	GAST
First downs	13	22
Total yards	263	433
Rushing yards	154	232
Passing yards	109	201
Turnovers	4	1
Time of possession	29:54	30:06

Team	Category	Player	Statistics
Savannah State	Passing	Antonio Bostick	12/18, 95 yards, TD, 2 INT
Savannah State	Rushing	Sheldon Barnes	25 rushes, 78 yards, 2 TD
Savannah State	Receiving	Brian Lackey	2 receptions, 52 yards, TD
Georgia State	Passing	Drew Little	16/25, 166 yards, 4 TD
Georgia State	Rushing	Kelton Hill	6 rushes, 95 yards, TD
Georgia State	Receiving	Albert Wilson	4 receptions, 72 yards, 2 TD

=== North Carolina Central ===
North Carolina Central Eagles at Georgia State Panthers – Game summary

Quarter	1	2	3	4	OT	Total
Eagles	0	7	0	10	0	17
Panthers	0	3	7	7	3	20

at Georgia Dome, Atlanta, Georgia

- Date: October 16
- Game time: 1:00 p.m. EDT
- Game weather: None (played indoors)
- Game attendance: 13,378
- Referee: Bill Broadhurst
- Box score, Recap

Game information
First quarter
- No scoring plays

Second quarter

- NCCU – Arthur Goforth 29-yard run (Frankie Cardelle kick), 7:46. Eagles 7–0. Drive: 5 plays, 59 yards, 2:24.
- GAST – Iain Vance 32-yard field goal, 3:34. Eagles 7–3. Drive: 11 plays, 58 yards, 4:05.

Third quarter

- GAST – Travis Evans 15-yard run (Iain Vance kick), 5:08. Panthers 10–7. Drive: 10 plays, 85 yards, 3:50.

Fourth quarter

- NCCU – Geovonie Irvine 47-yard pass from Keon Williams (Frankie Cardelle kick), 9:58. Eagles 14–10. Drive: 6 plays, 58 yards, 3:32.
- GAST – Danny Williams 24-yard pass from Drew Little (Iain Vance kick), 5:36. Panthers 17–14. Drive: 8 plays, 66 yards, 4:16.
- NCCU – Frankie Cardelle 44-yard field goal. Tied 17–17. Drive: 7 plays, 42 yards, 0:45.

Overtime

- GAST – Iain Vance 33-yard field goal. Panthers 20–17. Drive: 4 plays, 9 yards.

Statistics	NCCU	GAST
First downs	19	16
Total yards	329	317
Rushing yards	175	112
Passing yards	154	205
Turnovers	4	2
Time of possession	31:31	28:29

Team	Category	Player	Statistics
North Carolina Central	Passing	Keon Williams	11/22, 154 yards, TD, 2 INT
North Carolina Central	Rushing	Tim Shankle	13 rushes, 76 yards
North Carolina Central	Receiving	Geovonie Irvine	5 receptions, 92 yards, TD
Georgia State	Passing	Drew Little	16/29, 205 yards, TD
Georgia State	Rushing	Kelton Hill	9 rushes, 71 yards
Georgia State	Receiving	Danny Williams	5 receptions, 103 yards, TD

=== At Old Dominion ===
Georgia State Panthers at Old Dominion Monarchs – Game summary

Quarter	1	2	3	4	Total
Panthers	6	0	0	14	20
Monarchs	0	17	17	0	34

at Foreman Field, Norfolk, Virginia

- Date: October 23
- Game time: 3:30 p.m. EDT
- Game weather: Sunny, 70 °F (21 °C)
- Game attendance: 19,782
- Referee: Henry Wimberg
- Box score, Recap

Game information
First quarter
- GAST – Iain Vance 21-yard field goal, 9:28. Panthers 3–0. Drive: 9 plays, 43 yards, 4:04.
- GAST – Iain Vance 34-yard field goal, 2:32. Panthers 6–0. Drive: 10 plays, 63 yards, 4:26.

Second quarter

- ODU – Mario Crawford 6-yard run (Jarod Brown kick), 7:03. Monarchs 7–6. Drive: 10 plays, 80 yards, 3:27.
- ODU – Marquel Thomas 18-yard pass from Thomas DeMarco (Jarod Brown kick), 2:34. Monarchs 14–6. Drive: 11 plays, 54 yards, 3:19.
- ODU – Jarod Brown 44-yard field goal, 0:40. Monarchs 17–6. Drive: 8 plays, 27 yards, 1:06.

Third quarter

- ODU – Colby Goodwyn 23-yard run (Jarod Brown kick), 7:57. Monarchs 24–6. Drive: 8 plays, 71 yards, 3:18.
- ODU – Jarod Brown 29-yard field goal, 2:44. Monarchs 27–6. Drive: 5 plays, -3 yards, 0:45.
- ODU – Thomas DeMarco 1-yard run (Jarod Brown kick), 0:13. Monarchs 34–6. Drive: 5 plays, 29 yards, 1:33.

Fourth quarter

- GAST – Travis Evans 32-yard pass from Drew Little (Iain Vance kick), 11:16. Monarchs 34–13. Drive: 4 plays, 70 yards, 0:54.
- GAST – Drew Little 3-yard run (Iain Vance kick), 3:18. Monarchs 34–20. Drive: 9 plays, 80 yards, 3:55.

Statistics	GAST	ODU
First downs	21	23
Total yards	477	381
Rushing yards	58	229
Passing yards	419	152
Turnovers	4	0
Time of possession	30:03	29:57

Team	Category	Player	Statistics
Georgia State	Passing	Drew Little	32/53, 414 yards, TD
Georgia State	Rushing	Rosevelt Watson	7 rushes, 36 yards
Georgia State	Receiving	Danny Williams	11 receptions, 102 yards
Old Dominion	Passing	Thomas DeMarco	22/38, 152 yards, TD
Old Dominion	Rushing	Mario Crawford	18 rushes, 91 yards, TD
Old Dominion	Receiving	Monty Smalley	9 receptions, 61 yards

=== At South Alabama ===
Georgia State Panthers at South Alabama Jaguars – Game summary

Quarter	1	2	3	4	Total
Panthers	7	7	7	13	34
Jaguars	6	24	3	6	39

at Ladd–Peebles Stadium, Mobile, Alabama

- Date: October 30
- Game time: 5:00 p.m. EDT/4:00 p.m. CDT
- Game weather: Sunny and clear, 74 °F (23 °C)
- Game attendance: 23,446
- Referee: Allen Duhon
- Box score, Recap

Game information
First quarter
- GAST – Sidney Haynes 2-yard pass from Drew Little (Iain Vance kick), 9:31. Panthers 7–0. Drive: 10 plays, 60 yards, 5:29.
- USA – Kendall Houston 9-yard run (kick failed), 4:52. Panthers 7–6. Drive: 9 plays, 72 yards, 4:39.

Second quarter

- GAST – Drew Little 1-yard run (Iain Vance kick), 11:33. Panthers 14–6. Drive: 3 plays, 14 yards, 0:47.
- USA – Brynt Lavender 40-yard pass from C. J. Bennett (Lawson McGlon kick), 9:03. Panthers 14–13. Drive: 6 plays, 74 yards, 2:30.
- USA – Kevin Helms 9-yard pass from C. J. Bennett (Lawson McGlon kick), 6:57. Jaguars 20–14. Drive: 4 plays, 39 yards, 1:46.
- USA – Jereme Jones 3-yard pass from C. J. Bennett (Lawson McGlon kick), 0:41. Jaguars 27–14. Drive: 10 plays, 80 yards, 4:28.
- USA – Lawson McGlon 35-yard field goal, 0:03. Jaguars 30–14. Drive: 2 plays, 0 yards, 0:11.

Third quarter

- USA – Lawson McGlon 28-yard field goal, 3:52. Jaguars 33–14. Drive: 9 plays, 38 yards, 4:47.
- GAST – Danny Williams 47-yard pass from Drew Little (Iain Vance kick), 2:11. Jaguars 33–21. Drive: 3 plays, 41 yards, 1:41.

Fourth quarter

- USA – Lawson McGlon 18-yard field goal, 13:25. Jaguars 36–21. Drive: 8 plays, 37 yards, 3:46.
- GAST – Drew Little 1-yard run (kick blocked), 11:24. Jaguars 36–27. Drive: 4 plays, 64 yards, 2:01.
- USA – Lawson McGlon 31-yard field goal, 7:34. Jaguars 39–27. Drive: 8 plays, 42 yards, 3:50.
- GAST – Kelton Hill 5-yard run (Iain Vance kick), 3:57. Jaguars 39–34. Drive: 9 plays, 56 yards, 3:37.

Statistics	GAST	USA
First downs	15	24
Total yards	280	474
Rushing yards	46	293
Passing yards	234	181
Turnovers	2	1
Time of possession	23:59	36:01

Team	Category	Player	Statistics
Georgia State	Passing	Drew Little	20/34, 214 yards, 2 TD, 2 INT
Georgia State	Rushing	Kelton Hill	3 rushes, 25 yards, TD
Georgia State	Receiving	Danny Williams	5 receptions, 82 yards, TD
South Alabama	Passing	C. J. Bennett	12/24, 181 yards, 3 TD
South Alabama	Rushing	Kendall Houston	31 rushes, 175 yards, TD
South Alabama	Receiving	Brynt Lavender	4 receptions, 87 yards, TD

=== Lamar ===
Lamar Cardinals at Georgia State Panthers – Game summary

Quarter	1	2	3	4	Total
Cardinals	0	3	0	14	17
Panthers	10	0	3	10	23

at Georgia Dome, Atlanta, Georgia

- Date: November 6
- Game time: 1:00 p.m. EDT
- Game weather: None (played indoors)
- Game attendance: 14,689
- Referee: Will Gosselin
- Box score, Recap

Game information
First quarter
- GAST – Iain Vance 33-yard field goal, 11:59. Panthers 3–0. Drive: 5 plays, 46 yards, 2:54.
- GAST – Sidney Haynes 8-yard pass from Drew Little (Iain Vance kick), 10:10. Panthers 10–0. Drive: 3 plays, 6 yards, 0:46.

Second quarter

- LAM – Justin Stout 21-yard field goal, 5:14. Panthers 10–3. Drive: 11 plays, 76 yards, 4:51.

Third quarter

- GAST – Iain Vance 47-yard field goal, 5:57. Panthers 13–3. Drive: 8 plays, 33 yards, 4:19.

Fourth quarter

- LAM – J. J. Hayes 13-yard pass from Doug Prewitt (Justin Stout kick), 9:50. Panthers 13–10. Drive: 8 plays, 99 yards, 4:21.
- LAM – Ryan Clark 54-yard interception return (Justin Stout kick), 9:34. Cardinals 17–13.
- GAST – Arthur Williams 2-yard pass from Drew Little (Iain Vance kick), 4:52. Panthers 20–17. Drive: 10 plays, 71 yards, 4:35.
- GAST – Iain Vance 29-yard field goal, 1:39. Panthers 23–17. Drive: 5 plays, 19 yards, 2:16.

Statistics	LAM	GAST
First downs	18	16
Total yards	357	322
Rushing yards	84	133
Passing yards	273	189
Turnovers	1	1
Time of possession	28:45	31:15

Team	Category	Player	Statistics
Lamar	Passing	Doug Prewitt	19/36, 273 yards, TD, INT
Lamar	Rushing	Octavios Logan	7 rushes, 56 yards
Lamar	Receiving	J. J. Hayes	7 receptions, 138 yards, TD
Georgia State	Passing	Drew Little	22/35, 189 yards, 2 TD, INT
Georgia State	Rushing	Sidney Haynes	1 rush, 62 yards
Georgia State	Receiving	Arthur Williams	5 receptions, 66 yards, TD

=== At No. 10 (FBS) Alabama ===
Georgia State Panthers at No. 10 (FBS) Alabama Crimson Tide – Game summary

Quarter	1	2	3	4	Total
Panthers	0	7	0	0	7
No. 10 (FBS) Crimson Tide	14	28	14	7	63

at Bryant–Denny Stadium, Tuscaloosa, Alabama

- Date: November 18
- Game time: 7:30 p.m. EST/6:30 p.m. CST
- Game weather: Clear, 56 °F (13 °C)
- Game attendance: 101,821
- Referee: Marc Curles
- TV announcers (ESPNU): Chris Fowler, Kirk Herbstreit, Desmond Howard, and Erin Andrews
- Box score, Recap

Game information
First quarter
- ALA – Julio Jones 8-yard pass from Greg McElroy (Jeremy Shelley kick), 11:41. Crimson Tide 7–0. Drive: 8 plays, 67 yards, 3:19.
- ALA – Mark Ingram 1-yard run (Jeremy Shelley kick), 3:55. Crimson Tide 14–0. Drive: 11 plays, 71 yards, 5:09.

Second quarter

- ALA – C. J. Mosley 41-yard interception return (Jeremy Shelley kick), 14:09. Crimson Tide 21–0.
- ALA – Julio Jones 10-yard pass from Greg McElroy (Jeremy Shelley kick), 10:03. Crimson Tide 28–0. Drive: 4 plays, 72 yards, 1:46.
- ALA – Brandon Gibson 22-yard blocked punt return (Jeremy Shelley kick), 7:16. Crimson Tide 35–0.
- ALA – Eddie Lacy 3-yard run (Jeremy Shelley kick), 5:17. Crimson Tide 42–0. Drive: 4 plays, 35 yards, 1:51.
- GAST – Albert Wilson 97-yard kickoff return (Iain Vance kick), 5:02. Crimson Tide 42–7.

Third quarter

- ALA – Chris Underwood 7-yard pass from A. J. McCarron (Jeremy Shelley kick), 9:52. Crimson Tide 49–7. Drive: 7 plays, 34 yards, 4:02.
- ALA – Demetrius Goode 1-yard run (Cade Foster kick), 6:13. Crimson Tide 56–7. Drive: 4 plays, 19 yards, 1:56.

Fourth quarter

- ALA – Jalston Fowler 36-yard run (Cade Foster kick), 14:50. Crimson Tide 63–7. Drive: 3 plays, 50 yards, 1:11.

Statistics	GAST	ALA
First downs	7	24
Total yards	165	478
Rushing yards	91	262
Passing yards	74	216
Turnovers	5	0
Time of possession	30:42	29:18

Team	Category	Player	Statistics
Georgia State	Passing	Drew Little	4/11, 69 yards, 4 INT
Georgia State	Rushing	Kelton Hill	7 rushes, 30 yards
Georgia State	Receiving	Emmanuel Ogbuehi	1 reception, 55 yards
Alabama	Passing	Greg McElroy	12/13, 159 yards, 2 TD
Alabama	Rushing	Mark Ingram	12 rushes, 86 yards, TD
Alabama	Receiving	Julio Jones	7 receptions, 86 yards, 2 TD

This game was originally scheduled to be played on Saturday November 20, but in July 2010 was re-scheduled to the preceding Thursday in order to allow the Crimson Tide more time to prepare for the Auburn game.
