= 2010 Bethune–Cookman Wildcats football team =

American college football season

2010 Bethune–Cookman Wildcats football

MEAC co-champion

NCAA Division I Second Round, L 20–45 vs. New Hampshire
- Conference: Mid-Eastern Athletic Conference

Ranking
- Sports Network: No. 15
- FCS Coaches: No. 15
- Record: 10–2 (7–1 MEAC)
- Head coach: Brian Jenkins (1st season)
- Home stadium: Municipal Stadium

2010 Mid-Eastern Athletic Conference football standings
	Conf.			Overall
Team	W		L	W		L
No. 15 Bethune–Cookman +^	7	–	1	10	–	2
No. 16 South Carolina State +^	7	–	1	9	–	3
Florida A&M +	7	–	1	8	–	3
Hampton	5	–	3	6	–	5
Norfolk State	4	–	4	6	–	5
Morgan State	3	–	5	4	–	7
Delaware State	2	–	6	3	–	8
North Carolina A&T	1	–	7	1	–	10
Howard	0	–	8	1	–	10
North Carolina Central *	0	–	0	3	–	8
Savannah State *	0	–	0	1	–	10
+ – Conference co-champions; ^ – FCS playoff participant; * Not eligible for conference championship; Rankings from The Sports Network poll

The 2010 Bethune–Cookman Wildcats football team represented Bethune-Cookman University as a member of the Mid-Eastern Athletic Conference (MEAC) during the 2010 NCAA Division I FCS football season. The Wildcats were led by first-year head coach Brian Jenkins and played their home games at Municipal Stadium. They finished the season 10–2 overall and 7–1 in MEAC play, sharing the conference title with South Carolina State. Bethune–Cookman was invited to the NCAA Division I Football Championship playoffs, where they received a first-round bye before losing to New Hampshire in the second round.

== Schedule ==
Date	Time	Opponent	Rank	Site	TV	Result	Attendance	Source
September 4	4:00 pm	Edward Waters*		Municipal Stadium; Daytona Beach, FL		W 70–10	5,664	
September 18	4:00 pm	Savannah State		Municipal Stadium; Daytona Beach, FL		W 42–7	4,764	
September 25	4:00 pm	Norfolk State		Municipal Stadium; Daytona Beach, FL		W 21–7	5,371	
October 2	4:00 pm	at Morgan State		Hughes Stadium; Baltimore, MD		W 69–32	10,449	
October 9	4:00 pm	Delaware State^{†}		Municipal Stadium; Daytona Beach, FL		W 47–24	10,151	
October 16	1:30 pm	at No. 10 South Carolina State*	No. 23	Oliver C. Dawson Stadium; Orangeburg, SC		W 14–0	10,077	
October 23	2:00 pm	at North Carolina Central	No. 14	O'Kelly–Riddick Stadium; Durham, NC		W 23–10	12,716	
October 28	7:30 pm	North Carolina A&T	No. 12	Municipal Stadium; Daytona Beach, FL		W 67–17	8,112	
November 6	2:00 pm	at Hampton	No. 11	Armstrong Stadium; Hampton, VA	ESPNU	W 23–18	9,649	
November 13	1:00 pm	Howard	No. 10	Municipal Stadium; Daytona Beach, FL		W 35–20	5,431	
November 20	2:30 pm	vs. Florida A&M	No. 7	Florida Citrus Bowl; Orlando, FL (Florida Classic)	ESPNC	L 28–37	61,712	
December 4	1:00 pm	No. 11 New Hampshire*	No. 13	Municipal Stadium; Daytona Beach, FL (NCAA Division I Second Round)		L 20–45	5,738	
*Non-conference game; ^{†}Homecoming; Rankings from The Sports Network Poll released prior to the game; All times are in Eastern time
