= 2010 Hampton Pirates football team =

American college football season

2010 Hampton Pirates football
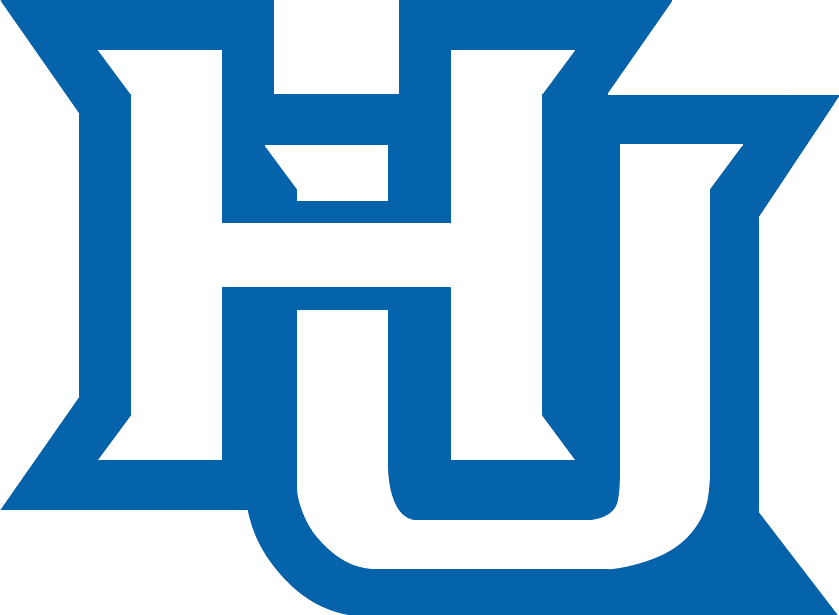
- Conference: Mid-Eastern Athletic Conference
- Record: 6–5 (5–3 MEAC)
- Head coach: Donovan Rose (2nd season)
- Offensive coordinator: Willie Snead III
- Defensive coordinator: Keith Goganious
- Home stadium: Armstrong Stadium

2010 Mid-Eastern Athletic Conference football standings
	Conf.			Overall
Team	W		L	W		L
No. 15 Bethune–Cookman +^	7	–	1	10	–	2
No. 16 South Carolina State +^	7	–	1	9	–	3
Florida A&M +	7	–	1	8	–	3
Hampton	5	–	3	6	–	5
Norfolk State	4	–	4	6	–	5
Morgan State	3	–	5	4	–	7
Delaware State	2	–	6	3	–	8
North Carolina A&T	1	–	7	1	–	10
Howard	0	–	8	1	–	10
North Carolina Central *	0	–	0	3	–	8
Savannah State *	0	–	0	1	–	10
+ – Conference co-champions; ^ – FCS playoff participant; * Not eligible for conference championship; Rankings from The Sports Network poll

The 2010 Hampton Pirates football team represented Hampton University as a member of the Mid-Eastern Athletic Conference (MEAC) During the 2010 NCAA Division I FCS football season. Led by second-year head coach Donovan Rose, the Pirates compiled an overall record of 6–5 with a mark of 5–3 in conference play, placing fourth in the MEAC. Hampton played home games at Armstrong Stadium in Hampton, Virginia.

== Schedule ==
Date	Time	Opponent	Site	TV	Result	Attendance	Source
September 2	7:00 pm	at Central Michigan*	Kelly/Shorts Stadium; Mount Pleasant, MI		L 0–33	17,311	
September 11	1:00 pm	at Howard	William H. Greene Stadium; Washington, DC (rivalry)		W 31–21	7,086	
September 18	6:00 pm	North Carolina A&T	Armstrong Stadium; Hampton, VA		W 35–21	9,439	
September 30	7:30 pm	at Delaware State	Alumni Stadium; Dover, DE	ESPNU	W 20–14	2,990	
October 9	4:00 pm	at North Carolina Central	O'Kelly–Riddick Stadium; Durham, NC		W 27–13	8,791	
October 16	1:00 pm	Norfolk State	Armstrong Stadium; Hampton, VA (rivalry)		W 7–6	11,916	
October 23	1:30 pm	at No. 18 South Carolina State	Oliver C. Dawson Stadium; Orangeburg, SC	ESPNU	L 7–10	22,010	
October 30	1:00 pm	Old Dominion*	Armstrong Stadium; Hampton, VA		L 14–28	8,605	
November 6	2:00 pm	No. 11 Bethune–Cookman	Armstrong Stadium; Hampton, VA	ESPNU	L 18–23	9,649	
November 13	3:00 pm	at Florida A&M	Bragg Memorial Stadium; Tallahassee, FL		L 12–17	10,306	
November 20	4:00 pm	at Morgan State	Hughes Stadium; Baltimore, MD		W 21–16	2,986	
*Non-conference game; Rankings from The Sports Network Poll released prior to the game; All times are in Eastern time
