= Mose Rison =

American football player and coach (1956–2022)

Biographical details
- Born: July 22, 1956; Flint, Michigan, U.S.
- Died: September 7, 2022 (aged 66); Sarasota, Florida, U.S.

Playing career

Football
- 1974–1977: Central Michigan
- Position: Running back

Coaching career (HC unless noted)

Football
- 1979–1980: Mount Morris HS (MI) (assistant)
- 1981–1987: Central Michigan (WR)
- 1988–1989: Navy (WR/ST)
- 1990–1994: Rutgers (WR/TE)
- 1995–2000: Stanford (WR)
- 2001–2002: New York Jets (WR)
- 2003: Arizona (WR)
- 2004: Livingstone (OC)
- 2005: Davidson (QB)
- 2006: North Carolina Central (OC)
- 2007–2010: North Carolina Central
- 2011–2016: Central Michigan (WR)

Basketball
- 1979–1980: Mount Morris HS (MI) (freshmen)

Head coaching record
- Overall: 16–22

Mose Lee Rison Jr. (July 22, 1956 – September 7, 2022) was an American football player and coach He was he served as the head football coach at North Carolina Central University in Durham, North Carolina, from 2007 to 2010, compiling a record of 16–22.

A native of Flint, Michigan, Rison played college football from 1974 to 1977 as a running back at Central Michigan University, rushing for 2,838 career yards. He died on September 7, 2022, at Sarasota Memorial Hospital in Sarasota, Florida.

== Head coaching record ==
Year	Team	Overall	Conference	Standing	Bowl/playoffs
North Carolina Central Eagles (NCAA Division II independent) (2007–2009)
2007	North Carolina Central	6–4			
2008	North Carolina Central	4–7			
2009	North Carolina Central	4–7			
North Carolina Central Eagles (Mid-Eastern Athletic Conference) (2010)
2010	North Carolina Central	2–4 (Note: Rison was fired after the first six games of the 2010 season. Darryl Bullock was appointed interim head coach for the remainder of the season. North Carolina Central finished the year with an overall record of 3–8. The Eagles were ineligible for the Mid-Eastern Athletic Conference championship, and their games did not figure in the conference standings.)	0–0		
North Carolina Central:		16–22			
Total:		16–22			
