= 2010 North Carolina A&T Aggies football team =

American college football season

2010 North Carolina A&T Aggies football
- Conference: Mid-Eastern Athletic Conference
- Record: 1–10 (1–7 MEAC)
- Head coach: Alonzo Lee (2nd season)
- Offensive coordinator: Chennis Berry (2nd season)
- Defensive coordinator: Dawson Odums (1st season)
- Home stadium: Aggie Stadium

2010 Mid-Eastern Athletic Conference football standings
	Conf.			Overall
Team	W		L	W		L
No. 15 Bethune–Cookman +^	7	–	1	10	–	2
No. 16 South Carolina State +^	7	–	1	9	–	3
Florida A&M +	7	–	1	8	–	3
Hampton	5	–	3	6	–	5
Norfolk State	4	–	4	6	–	5
Morgan State	3	–	5	4	–	7
Delaware State	2	–	6	3	–	8
North Carolina A&T	1	–	7	1	–	10
Howard	0	–	8	1	–	10
North Carolina Central *	0	–	0	3	–	8
Savannah State *	0	–	0	1	–	10
+ – Conference co-champions; ^ – FCS playoff participant; * Not eligible for conference championship; Rankings from The Sports Network poll

The 2010 North Carolina A&T Aggies football team represented North Carolina A&T State University as a member of Mid-Eastern Athletic Conference (MEAC) during the 2010 NCAA Division I FCS football season. Led by second-year head coach Alonzo Lee, the Aggies compiled an overall record of 1–10 with a mark of 1–7 in conference play, placing in eighth in the MEAC. North Carolina A&T played home games at Aggie Stadium in Greensboro, North Carolina.

== Schedule ==
Date	Time	Opponent	Site	TV	Result	Attendance	Source
September 4	6:00 pm	Winston-Salem State*	Aggie Stadium; Greensboro, NC (rivalry)		L 14–21	21,500	
September 11	4:00 pm	at Norfolk State	William "Dick" Price Stadium; Norfolk, VA		L 14–23	14,550	
September 18	6:00 pm	at Hampton	Armstrong Stadium; Hampton, VA		L 21–35	9,439	
September 25	6:00 pm	at North Carolina Central	O'Kelly–Riddick Stadium; Durham, NC (rivalry)		L 16–27	15,173	
October 2	4:00 pm	vs. Tennessee State*	Lucas Oil Stadium; Indianapolis, IN (Circle City Classic)		L 7–37	35,217	
October 9	1:30 pm	Morgan State^{†}	Aggie Stadium; Greensboro, NC		L 14–27	21,500	
October 16	1:00 pm	at Delaware State	Alumni Stadium; Dover, DE		L 26–31	4,131	
October 23	1:30 pm	Howard	Aggie Stadium; Greensboro, NC		W 52–32	6,351	
October 28	7:30 pm	at No. 12 Bethune–Cookman	Municipal Stadium; Daytona Beach, FL	ESPNU	L 17–67	8,112	
November 6	1:30 pm	Florida A&M	Aggie Stadium; Greensboro, NC		L 19–22 ^{OT}	7,242	
November 20	1:30 pm	No. 12 South Carolina State	Aggie Stadium; Greensboro, NC (rivalry)		L 3–48	10,348	
*Non-conference game; ^{†}Homecoming; Rankings from The Sports Network Poll released prior to the game; All times are in Eastern time
