= 2010 Florida A&M Rattlers football team =

American college football season

2010 Florida A&M Rattlers football
- Conference: Mid-Eastern Athletic Conference
- Record: 0–3, 8 wins vacated (0–1 MEAC, 8 wins vacated)
- Head coach: Joe Taylor (3rd season)
- Co-defensive coordinator: Earl Holmes (3rd season)
- Home stadium: Bragg Memorial Stadium

2010 Mid-Eastern Athletic Conference football standings
	Conf.			Overall
Team	W		L	W		L
No. 15 Bethune–Cookman +^	7	–	1	10	–	2
No. 16 South Carolina State +^	7	–	1	9	–	3
Florida A&M +	7	–	1	8	–	3
Hampton	5	–	3	6	–	5
Norfolk State	4	–	4	6	–	5
Morgan State	3	–	5	4	–	7
Delaware State	2	–	6	3	–	8
North Carolina A&T	1	–	7	1	–	10
Howard	0	–	8	1	–	10
North Carolina Central *	0	–	0	3	–	8
Savannah State *	0	–	0	1	–	10
+ – Conference co-champions; ^ – FCS playoff participant; * Not eligible for conference championship; Rankings from The Sports Network poll

The 2010 Florida A&M Rattlers football team represented Florida A&M University as a member of the Mid-Eastern Athletic Conference (MEAC) during the 2010 NCAA Division I FCS football season. The Rattlers were led by third-year head coach Joe Taylor and played their home games at Bragg Memorial Stadium. They finished the season 8–3 overall and 8–1 in conference play to share the MEAC title with Bethune–Cookman and South Carolina State. However, all of Florida A&M's wins from the 2010 season were later vacated by the NCAA for fielding ineligible students. This was the Rattlers last conference championship before leaving the MEAC in 2020.

== Schedule ==
Date	Time	Opponent	Site	TV	Result	Attendance	Source
September 2	7:30 p.m.	at No. 20 (FBS) Miami (FL)*	Sun Life Stadium; Miami Gardens, FL	ESPN3	L 0–45	53,674	
September 11	6:00 p.m.	at Delaware State	Alumni Stadium; Dover, DE		W 17–14 (vacated)	3,867	
September 18	1:00 p.m.	at Howard	William H. Greene Stadium; Washington, DC		W 50–7 (vacated)	5,286	
September 25	3:45 p.m.	vs. Tennessee State*	Georgia Dome; Atlanta, GA (Atlanta Football Classic)	NBCSN	L 18–29	54,202	
October 2	6:00 p.m.	No. 9 South Carolina State	Bragg Memorial Stadium; Tallahassee, FL		L 0–19	14,052	
October 16	3:00 p.m.	Savannah State	Bragg Memorial Stadium; Tallahassee, FL		W 31–0 (vacated)	8,834	
October 23	2:00 p.m.	at Norfolk State	William "Dick" Price Stadium; Norfolk, VA		W 17–13 (vacated)	21,118	
October 30	3:00 p.m.	Morgan State^{†}	Bragg Memorial Stadium; Tallahassee, FL		W 31–17 (vacated)	30,459	
November 6	1:30 p.m.	at North Carolina A&T	Aggie Stadium; Greensboro, NC		W 22–19 ^{OT} (vacated)	7,242	
November 13	3:00 p.m.	Hampton	Bragg Memorial Stadium; Tallahassee, FL		W 17–12 (vacated)	10,306	
November 20	2:30 p.m.	vs. No. 7 Bethune–Cookman	Florida Citrus Bowl; Orlando, FL (Florida Classic)	ESPNC	W 38–27 (vacated)	61,712	
*Non-conference game; ^{†}Homecoming; Rankings from The Sports Network Poll released prior to the game; All times are in Eastern time
