= 2010 Delaware State Hornets football team =

American college football season

2010 Delaware State Hornets football
- Conference: Mid-Eastern Athletic Conference
- Record: 3–8 (2–6 MEAC)
- Head coach: Al Lavan (7th season)
- Offensive coordinator: Doug Sams (4th season)
- Defensive coordinator: Rayford Petty (4th season)
- Home stadium: Alumni Stadium

2010 Mid-Eastern Athletic Conference football standings
	Conf.			Overall
Team	W		L	W		L
No. 15 Bethune–Cookman +^	7	–	1	10	–	2
No. 16 South Carolina State +^	7	–	1	9	–	3
Florida A&M +	7	–	1	8	–	3
Hampton	5	–	3	6	–	5
Norfolk State	4	–	4	6	–	5
Morgan State	3	–	5	4	–	7
Delaware State	2	–	6	3	–	8
North Carolina A&T	1	–	7	1	–	10
Howard	0	–	8	1	–	10
North Carolina Central *	0	–	0	3	–	8
Savannah State *	0	–	0	1	–	10
+ – Conference co-champions; ^ – FCS playoff participant; * Not eligible for conference championship; Rankings from The Sports Network poll

The 2010 Delaware State Hornets football team represented Delaware State University as a member of the Mid-Eastern Athletic Conference (MEAC) in the 2010 NCAA Division I FCS football season. The Hornets were led by seventh-year head coach Al Lavan and played their home games at Alumni Stadium. They finished the season 3–8 overall and 2–6 in conference play to place in seventh in the MEAC.

== Schedule ==
Date	Time	Opponent	Site	TV	Result	Attendance	Source
September 5	12:00 pm	vs. Southern*	Florida Citrus Bowl; Orlando, FL (MEAC/SWAC Challenge)		L 27–37	16,367	
September 11	6:00 pm	Florida A&M	Alumni Stadium; Dover, DE		L 17–14	3,867	
September 25	6:00 pm	at Coastal Carolina*	Brooks Stadium; Conway, SC		L 14–34	8,857	
September 30	7:35 pm	Hampton	Alumni Stadium; Dover, DE	ESPNU	L 14–20	2,990	
October 9	4:00 pm	at Bethune–Cookman	Municipal Stadium; Daytona Beach, FL		L 24–47	10,151	
October 16	1:00 pm	North Carolina A&T	Alumni Stadium; Dover, DE		W 31–26	4,131	
October 23	1:00 pm	at Morgan State	Hughes Stadium; Baltimore, MD		L 24–34	14,312	
October 30	1:00 pm	No. 17 South Carolina State	Alumni Stadium; Dover, DE		L 21–38	2,130	
November 6	1:00 pm	North Carolina Central	Alumni Stadium; Dover, DE		W 29–7	1,622	
November 13	1:00 pm	at Norfolk State	William "Dick" Price Stadium; Norfolk, VA		L 21–31	6,181	
November 20	1:00 pm	at Howard	William H. Greene Stadium; Washington, DC		W 53–43	3,054	
*Non-conference game; Rankings from The Sports Network Poll released prior to the game; All times are in Eastern time
