= 2010 Norfolk State Spartans football team =

American college football season

2010 Norfolk State Spartans football
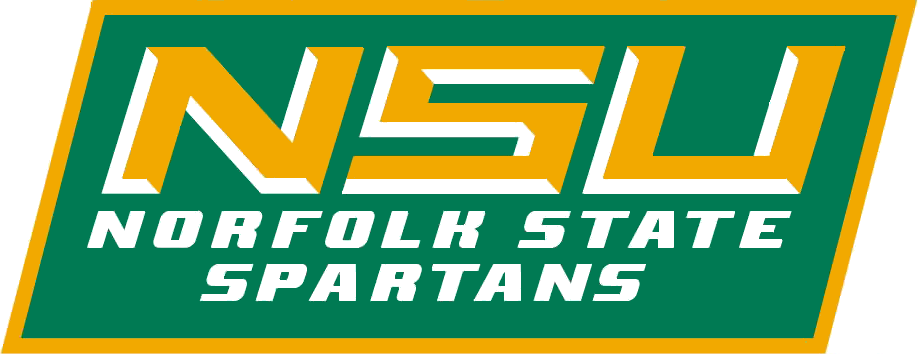
- Conference: Mid-Eastern Athletic Conference
- Record: 6–5 (4–4 MEAC)
- Head coach: Pete Adrian (6th season)
- Home stadium: William "Dick" Price Stadium

2010 Mid-Eastern Athletic Conference football standings
	Conf.			Overall
Team	W		L	W		L
No. 15 Bethune–Cookman +^	7	–	1	10	–	2
No. 16 South Carolina State +^	7	–	1	9	–	3
Florida A&M +	7	–	1	8	–	3
Hampton	5	–	3	6	–	5
Norfolk State	4	–	4	6	–	5
Morgan State	3	–	5	4	–	7
Delaware State	2	–	6	3	–	8
North Carolina A&T	1	–	7	1	–	10
Howard	0	–	8	1	–	10
North Carolina Central *	0	–	0	3	–	8
Savannah State *	0	–	0	1	–	10
+ – Conference co-champions; ^ – FCS playoff participant; * Not eligible for conference championship; Rankings from The Sports Network poll

The 2010 Norfolk State Spartans football team represented Norfolk State University in the 2010 NCAA Division I FCS football season. The Spartans were led by sixth-year head coach Pete Adrian and played their home games at William "Dick" Price Stadium. They were a member of the Mid-Eastern Athletic Conference. They finished the season 6–5, 4–4 in MEAC play.

== Schedule ==
Date	Time	Opponent	Site	TV	Result	Attendance	Source
September 2	7:30 pm	at Rutgers*	Rutgers Stadium; Piscataway, NJ	ESPN3	L 0–31	46,311	
September 11	4:00 pm	North Carolina A&T	William "Dick" Price Stadium; Norfolk, VA	SSC	W 23–14	14,550	
September 18	6:00 pm	Virginia State*	William "Dick" Price Stadium; Norfolk, VA	SSC	W 51–28	11,789	
September 25	4:00 pm	at Bethune–Cookman	Municipal Stadium; Daytona Beach, FL		L 7–21	5,371	
October 9	2:00 pm	at No. 9 South Carolina State	Oliver C. Dawson Stadium; Orangeburg, SC		L 13–34	21,971	
October 16	1:00 pm	at Hampton	Armstrong Stadium; Hampton, VA (rivalry)		L 6–7	11,916	
October 23	2:00 pm	Florida A&M^{†}	William "Dick" Price Stadium; Norfolk, VA	SSC	L 13–17	21,118	
October 30	1:00 pm	at Howard	William H. Greene Stadium; Washington, DC		W 10–9	7,086	
November 6	1:00 pm	Morgan State	William "Dick" Price Stadium; Norfolk, VA		W 37–25	5,755	
November 13	1:00 pm	Delaware State	William "Dick" Price Stadium; Norfolk, VA	SSC	W 31–21	6,181	
November 20	2:00 pm	at Savannah State	Memorial Stadium; Savannah, GA		W 42–6	4,967	
*Non-conference game; ^{†}Homecoming; Rankings from The Sports Network Poll released prior to the game; All times are in Eastern time
