= 2010 South Carolina State Bulldogs football team =

American college football season

2010 South Carolina State Bulldogs football

MEAC co-champion

FCS Playoffs First Round, L 16–41 vs. Georgia Southern
- Conference: Mid-Eastern Athletic Conference

Ranking
- Sports Network: No. 16
- FCS Coaches: No. 17
- Record: 9–3 (7–1 MEAC)
- Head coach: Oliver Pough (9th season)
- Home stadium: Oliver C. Dawson Stadium

2010 Mid-Eastern Athletic Conference football standings
	Conf.			Overall
Team	W		L	W		L
No. 15 Bethune–Cookman +^	7	–	1	10	–	2
No. 16 South Carolina State +^	7	–	1	9	–	3
Florida A&M +	7	–	1	8	–	3
Hampton	5	–	3	6	–	5
Norfolk State	4	–	4	6	–	5
Morgan State	3	–	5	4	–	7
Delaware State	2	–	6	3	–	8
North Carolina A&T	1	–	7	1	–	10
Howard	0	–	8	1	–	10
North Carolina Central *	0	–	0	3	–	8
Savannah State *	0	–	0	1	–	10
+ – Conference co-champions; ^ – FCS playoff participant; * Not eligible for conference championship; Rankings from The Sports Network poll

The 2010 South Carolina State Bulldogs football team represented South Carolina State University in the 2010 NCAA Division I FCS football season. The team was led by Oliver Pough in his ninth year as head coach and played its home games at Oliver C. Dawson Stadium. It finished the regular season with a 9–2 record overall and a 7–1 record in the Mid-Eastern Athletic Conference, making them conference co-champions alongside Bethune–Cookman. The team qualified for the playoffs, in which it was eliminated in the first round by Georgia Southern.

== Schedule ==
Date	Time	Opponent	Rank	Site	TV	Result	Attendance	Source
September 4	1:00 pm	at No. 16 (FBS) Georgia Tech*	No. 11	Bobby Dodd Stadium; Atlanta, GA	ESPN3	L 10–41	51,668	
September 11	6:00 pm	Mississippi Valley State*	No. 15	Oliver C. Dawson Stadium; Orangeburg, SC		W 44–0	12,224	
September 18	2:00 pm	at Benedict*	No. 14	Charlie W. Johnson Stadium; Columbia, SC		W 61–20	1,334	
October 2	6:00 pm	at Florida A&M	No. 9	Bragg Memorial Stadium; Tallahassee, FL		W 19–0	14,052	
October 9	2:00 pm	Norfolk State	No. 9	Oliver C. Dawson Stadium; Orangeburg, SC		W 34–13	21,971	
October 16	1:30 pm	No. 23 Bethune–Cookman	No. 10	Oliver C. Dawson Stadium; Orangeburg, SC		L 0–14	10,077	
October 23	1:30 pm	Hampton	No. 18	Oliver C. Dawson Stadium; Orangeburg, SC	ESPNU	W 10–7	22,010	
October 30	1:00 pm	at Delaware State	No. 17	Alumni Stadium; Dover, DE		W 38–21	2,130	
November 6	1:30 pm	Howard	No. 16	Oliver C. Dawson Stadium; Orangeburg, SC		W 54–14	8,007	
November 11	7:30 pm	at Morgan State	No. 15	Hughes Stadium; Baltimore, MD		W 32–10	1,054	
November 20	1:30 pm	at North Carolina A&T	No. 12	Aggie Stadium; Greensboro, NC (rivalry)		W 48–3	10,348	
November 27	2:00 pm	at No. 22 Georgia Southern*	No. 11	Paulson Stadium; Statesboro, GA (NCAA Division I First Round)	NCAA-AA	L 16–41	11,577	
*Non-conference game; Rankings from The Sports Network Poll released prior to the game; All times are in Eastern time
