= Darryl Bullock =

American football coach and player

Current position
- Title: Assistant head coach
- Team: Norfolk State
- Conference: MEAC

Biographical details
- Born: Harrisburg, Pennsylvania, U.S.
- Education: Pennsylvania State University (1990)

Playing career
- 1986–1988: Penn State
- Position: Defensive tackle

Coaching career (HC unless noted)
- 1990–1991: Michigan (GA)
- 1992–1993: Penn State (intern)
- 1994: Morehead State (DL)
- 1995: Immokalee HS (FL)
- 1996–1998: Morgan State (TE/OL)
- 1998 (summer): New England Patriots (intern)
- 1999–2000: New Hampshire (OL)
- 2000 (summer): Miami Dolphins (intern)
- 2001 (summer): Cleveland Browns (intern)
- 2001–2002: Gardner–Webb (DL)
- 2003: East Tennessee State (DL)
- 2004: Elon (DL)
- 2005–2006: Tennessee State (TE/OL)
- 2007–2010: North Carolina Central (OL)
- 2009 (summer): Dallas Cowboys (intern)
- 2010: North Carolina Central (interim HC)
- 2011–2013: Hampton (OL)
- 2014: Chowan (DL)
- 2015: Langston (AHC/OC)
- 2016: Shorter (OL)
- 2017–2018: Howard (OL)
- 2019: Dutchtown HS (GA) (OL)
- 2020: Morgan State (OL)
- 2021: Fayetteville State (assistant)
- 2023–2024: Hampton (OL)
- 2025–present: Norfolk State (AHC)

Head coaching record
- Overall: 1–4 (college)

Darryl Bullock is an American college football coach. He is the assistant head football coach at Norfolk State University, a position he has held since 2025. Bullock served as the interim head football coach at North Carolina Central University in 2010 and the head football coach at Immokalee High School in 1995. Prior to Norfolk State, Bullock coached at Hampton University. He also coached for Michigan, Penn State, Morgan State, New Hampshire, Gardner–Webb, East Tennessee State, Elon, Tennessee State, Chowan, Langston, Shorter, Howard, Dutchtown High School, and Fayetteville State. He also interned with the New England Patriots, Miami Dolphins, Cleveland Browns, and Dallas Cowboys of the National Football League (NFL). He played college football for Penn State as a defensive tackle where he was a member of their 1986 consensus national championship team.

== Head coaching record ==
=== College ===
Year	Team	Overall	Conference	Standing	Bowl/playoffs
North Carolina Central Eagles (Mid-Eastern Athletic Conference) (2010)
2010	North Carolina Central	1–4 (Note: Mose Rison served as head coach for first six games of the 2010 season before has fired. Bullock was appointed interim head coach for the remainder of the season. North Carolina Central finished the year with an overall record of 3–8. The Eagles were ineligible for the Mid-Eastern Athletic Conference championship, and their games did not figure in the conference standings.)	0–0	NA	
North Carolina Central:		1–4	0–0		
Total:		1–4			
