= 2010 Howard Bison football team =

American college football season

2010 Howard Bison football
- Conference: Mid-Eastern Athletic Conference
- Record: 1–10 (0–8 MEAC)
- Head coach: Carey Bailey (4th season)
- Home stadium: William H. Greene Stadium

2010 Mid-Eastern Athletic Conference football standings
	Conf.			Overall
Team	W		L	W		L
No. 15 Bethune–Cookman +^	7	–	1	10	–	2
No. 16 South Carolina State +^	7	–	1	9	–	3
Florida A&M +	7	–	1	8	–	3
Hampton	5	–	3	6	–	5
Norfolk State	4	–	4	6	–	5
Morgan State	3	–	5	4	–	7
Delaware State	2	–	6	3	–	8
North Carolina A&T	1	–	7	1	–	10
Howard	0	–	8	1	–	10
North Carolina Central *	0	–	0	3	–	8
Savannah State *	0	–	0	1	–	10
+ – Conference co-champions; ^ – FCS playoff participant; * Not eligible for conference championship; Rankings from The Sports Network poll

The 2010 Howard Bison football team represented Howard University as a member of the Mid-Eastern Athletic Conference (MEAC) during the 2010 NCAA Division I FCS football season. Led by fourth-year head coach Carey Bailey, the Bison compiled an overall record of 1–10, with a conference record of 0–8, and finished ninth in the MEAC.

== Schedule ==
Date	Opponent	Site	Result	Attendance	Source
September 4	at Holy Cross*	Fitton Field; Worcester, MA	L 7–38	6,982	
September 11	Hampton	William H. Greene Stadium; Washington, DC (rivalry)	L 21–31	7,086	
September 18	Florida A&M	William H. Greene Stadium; Washington, DC	L 7–50	5,286	
September 25	vs. Morgan State	MetLife Stadium; East Rutherford, NJ (Urban League Classic, rivalry)	L 3–20	34,167	
October 2	Lincoln (PA)*	William H. Greene Stadium; Washington, DC	W 28–14		
October 9	at Furman*	Paladin Stadium; Greenville, SC	L 15–56	9,239	
October 23	at North Carolina A&T	Aggie Stadium; Greensboro, NC	L 32–52	6,351	
October 30	Norfolk State	William H. Greene Stadium; Washington, DC	L 9–10	7,086	
November 6	at No. 16 South Carolina State	Oliver C. Dawson Stadium; Orangeburg, SC	L 14–54	8,007	
November 13	at No. 10 Bethune–Cookman	Municipal Stadium; Daytona Beach, FL	L 20–35	5,431	
November 20	Delaware State	William H. Greene Stadium; Washington, DC	L 43–53	3,054	
*Non-conference game; Rankings from The Sports Network Poll released prior to the game
