= 2010 Morgan State Bears football team =

American college football season

2010 Morgan State Bears football
- Conference: Mid-Eastern Athletic Conference
- Record: 4–7 (3–5 MEAC)
- Head coach: Donald Hill-Eley (9th season)
- Home stadium: Hughes Stadium

2010 Mid-Eastern Athletic Conference football standings
	Conf.			Overall
Team	W		L	W		L
No. 15 Bethune–Cookman +^	7	–	1	10	–	2
No. 16 South Carolina State +^	7	–	1	9	–	3
Florida A&M +	7	–	1	8	–	3
Hampton	5	–	3	6	–	5
Norfolk State	4	–	4	6	–	5
Morgan State	3	–	5	4	–	7
Delaware State	2	–	6	3	–	8
North Carolina A&T	1	–	7	1	–	10
Howard	0	–	8	1	–	10
North Carolina Central *	0	–	0	3	–	8
Savannah State *	0	–	0	1	–	10
+ – Conference co-champions; ^ – FCS playoff participant; * Not eligible for conference championship; Rankings from The Sports Network poll

The 2010 Morgan State Bears football team represented Morgan State University as a member of the Mid-Eastern Athletic Conference (MEAC) during the 2010 NCAA Division I FCS football season. Led by ninth-year head coach Donald Hill-Eley, the Bears compiled an overall record of 4–7, with a mark of 3–5 in conference play, and finished sixth in the MEAC.

== Schedule ==
Date	Opponent	Site	Result	Attendance	Source
September 4	Bowie State*	Hughes Stadium; Baltimore, MD	W 14–7	7,419	
September 11	at Maryland*	Byrd Stadium; College Park, MD	L 3–62	40,099	
September 18	at No. 23 North Dakota State*	Fargodome; Fargo, ND	L 9–35	17,340	
September 25	vs. Howard*	MetLife Stadium; East Rutherford, NJ (Urban League Classic, rivalry)	W 20–3	34,167	
October 2	Bethune–Cookman	Hughes Stadium; Baltimore, MD	L 32–69	10,449	
October 9	at North Carolina A&T	Aggie Stadium; Greensboro, NC	W 27–14	21,500	
October 23	Delaware State	Hughes Stadium; Baltimore, MD	W 34–24	14,312	
October 30	at Florida A&M	Bragg Memorial Stadium; Tallahassee, FL	L 17–31	30,459	
November 6	at Norfolk State	William "Dick" Price Stadium; Norfolk, VA	L 25–37	5,755	
November 11	No. 15 South Carolina State	Hughes Stadium; Baltimore, MD	L 10–32	1,054	
November 20	Hampton	Hughes Stadium; Baltimore, MD	L 16–21	2,986	
*Non-conference game; Rankings from The Sports Network Poll released prior to the game
