= Memorial Stadium (Savannah) =

Stadium in Savannah, Georgia

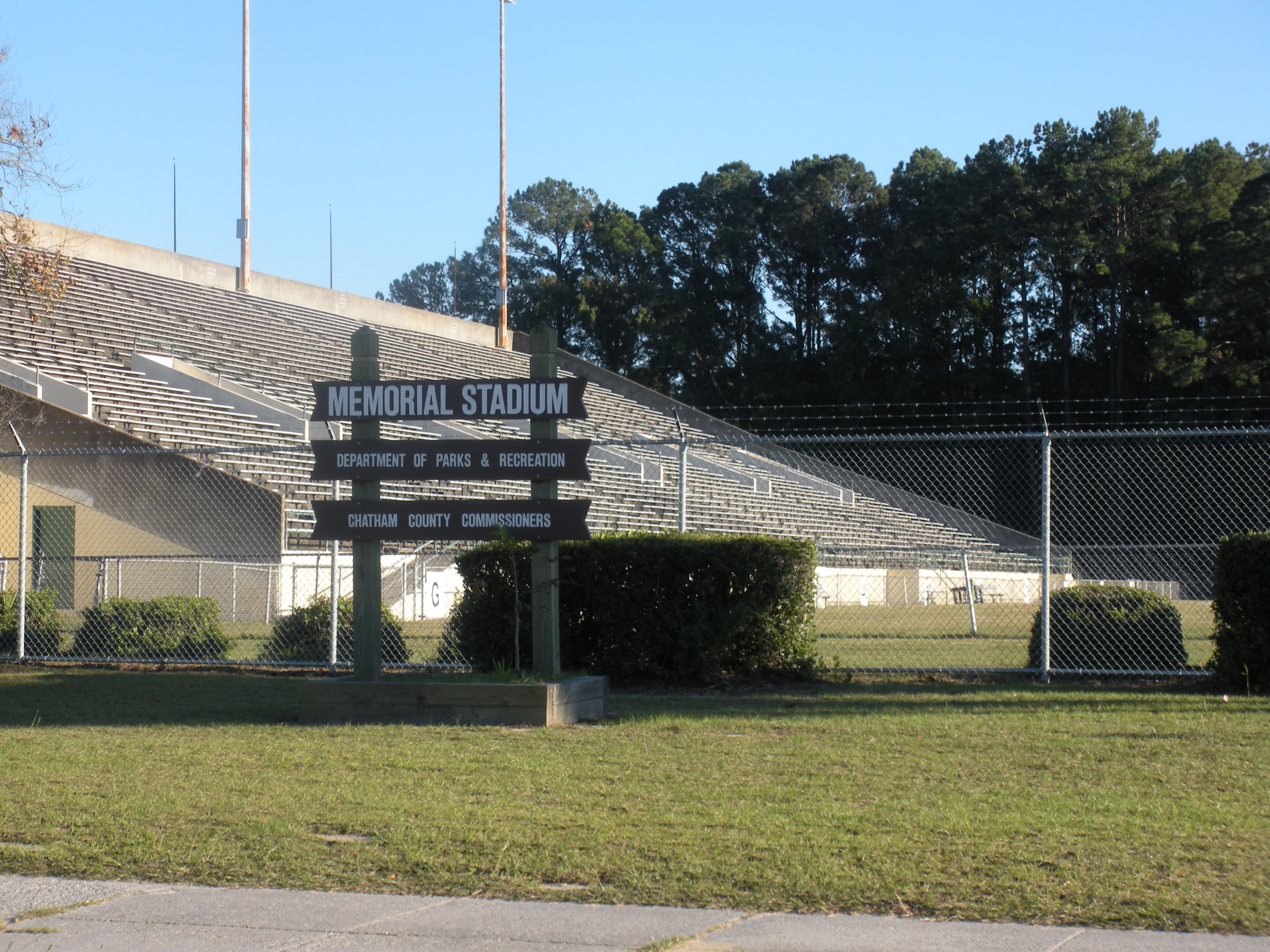
- Exterior view of the venue in 2008
- Interactive map of Memorial Stadium
- Location: Savannah, Georgia
- Coordinates: 31.993236°N 81.079831°W
- Owner: Chatham County, Georgia
- Operator: Chatham County Public Works and Park Services
- Capacity: 15,000 (1957–2017); 5,000 (2018–present)
- Current use: Football; Soccer

Construction
- Built: 1957
- Opened: 1957; 69 years ago
- Renovated: 2018

Tenants
- Savannah-Chatham County Public Schools (1957–present); Savannah State University (1957–1968); Benedictine Military School (1957–2011); Savannah Clovers FC (NISA) (2018–2023)

Website
- chathamcountyga.gov/memorial-stadium

Memorial Stadium is a 5,000 capacity county owned multi-purpose stadium near Savannah, Georgia. The stadium is primarily used for American football by high schools in Chatham County, and for Savannah Clovers FC soccer matches.

The facility is dedicated to Georgians who died at war.

The stadium was modernized in 2018, reopening in September that year.
