= Henderson Stadium (Macon, Georgia) =

- Interactive map of Henderson Stadium
- Full name: Brad Henderson Memorial Stadium
- Location: Macon, Georgia
- Coordinates: 32.823183°N 83.6769°W
- Surface: grass

Brad Henderson Memorial Stadium is a football stadium in Macon, Georgia. It is the home field of the Southwest-Macon Patriots and the Central-Macon Chargers.

The stadium was named after Brad Henderson (son of high school football coach Billy Henderson), who died in an automobile accident in Macon on September 7, 1964.
