= 2011 Southeastern Conference football season =

- League: NCAA Division I FBS
- Sport: football
- Duration: September 1, 2011 through January 9, 2012
- Teams: 12
- TV partner(s): CBS, ESPN, ESPN2, ESPNU, SEC Network, FSN, CSS

2012 NFL Draft
- Top draft pick: Trent Richardson (Alabama)
- Picked by: Cleveland Browns, 3rd overall

Regular season
- Season champions: LSU
- East champions: Georgia
- East runners-up: South Carolina
- West champions: LSU
- West runners-up: Alabama

SEC Championship Game
- Champions: LSU

Football seasons
- 2010 2012

2011 Southeastern Conference football standings
	Conf.			Overall
Team	W		L	W		L
Eastern Division
No. 19 Georgia x	7	–	1	10	–	4
No. 9 South Carolina	6	–	2	11	–	2
Florida	3	–	5	7	–	6
Vanderbilt	2	–	6	6	–	7
Kentucky	2	–	6	5	–	7
Tennessee	1	–	7	5	–	7
Western Division
No. 2 LSU x$	8	–	0	13	–	1
No. 1 Alabama %#	7	–	1	12	–	1
No. 5 Arkansas	6	–	2	11	–	2
Auburn	4	–	4	8	–	5
Mississippi State	2	–	6	7	–	6
Ole Miss*	0	–	8	2	–	10
Championship: LSU 42, Georgia 10
# – BCS National Champion; $ – BCS representative as conference champion; % – BCS at-large representative; x – Division champion/co-champions; * Ole Miss vacated all wins due to NCAA violations.; Rankings from AP Poll

The 2011 Southeastern Conference football season began on Thursday, September 1, 2011, with Kentucky taking on Western Kentucky on ESPNU. The season concluded on January 9, 2012, as the Alabama Crimson Tide shut out LSU Tigers, 21–0 in the Allstate BCS National Championship Game at the Mercedes-Benz Superdome in New Orleans to claim their 14th national championship in school history. It was also the final season for the SEC before Texas A&M and Missouri joined the conference from the Big 12 the following season.

== Preseason ==
Florida head coach Urban Meyer retired in early December citing his health concerns and wanting to be around his family more. Meyer then joined ESPN as an analyst for its college football coverage during the 2011 season. In his place Florida hired Texas defensive coordinator Will Muschamp as the new head coach. Muschamp elected to bring in former Notre Dame head coach Charlie Weis as his offensive coordinator.

Vanderbilt interim head coach Robbie Caldwell had a tough year in 2010 with injuries and tough schedule, going 2–10. The school decided to search for a new coach to replace former head coach Bobby Johnson, who retired unexpectedly in July 2010. Vanderbilt hired Maryland offensive coordinator James Franklin, and this is Franklin's first head coaching job.

LSU decided to part ways with offensive coordinator Gary Crowton because of a lack of offensive production the previous seasons. In his place LSU hired former Louisville head coach Steve Kragthorpe.

Kentucky added new schemes to its defense by adding former Cincinnati head coach Rick Minter as its co-defensive coordinator alongside Steve Brown.

2011 Pre-season Coaches All-SEC

First Team Offense
Position	Player	Class	Team
QB	Aaron Murray	So.	Georgia
RB	Marcus Lattimore	So.	South Carolina
RB	Trent Richardson	Jr.	Alabama
WR	Greg Childs	Sr.	Arkansas
WR	Alshon Jeffery	Jr.	South Carolina
TE	Orson Charles	Jr.	Georgia
OL	Cordy Glenn	Sr.	Georgia
OL	Barrett Jones	Jr.	Alabama
OL	Bradley Sowell	Sr.	Mississippi
OL	Larry Warford	Jr.	Kentucky
C	William Vlachos	Sr.	Alabama

First Team Defense
Position	Player	Class	Team
DL	Jake Bequette	Sr.	Arkansas
DL	Josh Chapman	Sr.	Alabama
DL	Malik Jackson	Sr.	Tennessee
DL	Devin Taylor	Jr.	South Carolina
LB	Dont'a Hightower	Jr.	Alabama
LB	Chris Marve	Sr.	Vanderbilt
LB	Danny Trevathan	Sr.	Kentucky
DB	Mark Barron	Sr.	Alabama
DB	Stephon Gilmore	Jr.	South Carolina
DB	Robert Lester	Jr.	Alabama
DB	Morris Claiborne	Jr.	Louisiana State

First Team Special Teams
Position	Player	Class	Team
K	Blair Walsh	Sr.	Georgia
P	Drew Butler	Sr.	Georgia
RS	Brandon Boykin	Sr.	Georgia
All-purpose back	Joe Adams	Sr.	Arkansas

== Rankings ==
Legend
Increase in ranking
Decrease in ranking
Not ranked previous week

		(Pre) Aug 20	Sept. 6	Sept. 11	Sept. 18	Sept. 25	Oct. 2	Oct. 9	Oct. 16	Oct. 23	Oct. 30	Nov. 6	Nov. 13	Nov. 20	Nov. 27	Dec. 4	Final
Alabama	AP	2	3	2	3	3	2	2	2	2	2	4	3	2	2	2	1
Alabama	C	2	2	2	2	2	3	3	3	2	2	4	3	2	2	2	1
Alabama	BCS	Not released							2	2	2	3	3	2	2	2	
Arkansas	AP	15	14	14	14	18	10	10	10	8	8	8	6	3	7	6	5
Arkansas	C	14	13	13	12	18	12	11	10	8	8	8	6	3	10	7	5
Arkansas	BCS	Not released							9	10	7	8	6	3	8	6	
Auburn	AP	23	NR	21	NR	NR	15	24	19	NR	25	24	NR	NR			
Auburn	C	19	22	19	NR	NR	23	NR	23	NR	NR	25	NR	NR			
Auburn	BCS	Not released							20	23	22	20	24	24	NR	25	
Florida	AP	22	18	16	15	12	17	NR									
Florida	C	23	18	17	15	12	18	NR									
Florida	BCS	Not released															
Georgia	AP	19	NR						25	22	18	14	13	13	12	18	19
Georgia	C	22	NR							21	20	16	15	14	14	18	20
Georgia	BCS	Not released								22	18	15	14	13	14	16	
Kentucky	AP																
Kentucky	C																
Kentucky	BCS	Not released															
LSU	AP	4	2	3	2	1	1	1	1	1	1	1	1	1	1	1	2
LSU	C	4	3	3	3	2	2	2	2	1	1	1	1	1	1	1	2
LSU	BCS	Not released							1	1	1	1	1	1	1	1	
Mississippi State	AP	20	16	25	NR												
Mississippi State	C	20	17	25	NR												
Mississippi State	BCS	Not released															
Ole Miss	AP																
Ole Miss	C																
Ole Miss	BCS	Not released															
South Carolina	AP	12	12	10	12	10	18	15	14	14	10	15	14	14	14	10	9
South Carolina	C	12	12	11	10	9	14	13	12	14	10	15	14	13	13	9	8
South Carolina	BCS	Not released							14	13	9	13	12	12	12	9	
Tennessee	AP																
Tennessee	C																
Tennessee	BCS	Not released															
Vanderbilt	AP																
Vanderbilt	C																
Vanderbilt	BCS	Not released															

== Regular season ==
Index to colors and formatting
SEC member won
SEC member lost
SEC teams in **bold**

All times Eastern time.

Rankings reflect that of the AP poll for that week until week eight when the BCS rankings will be used.

=== Week One ===
Date	Time	Visiting team	Home team	Site	Broadcast	Result	Attendance	Reference
September 1	8:00 pm	No. 20 **Mississippi State**	Memphis	Liberty Bowl • Memphis, Tennessee	FSN South	**W** 59–14	33,990	
September 1	9:15 pm	**Kentucky**	Western Kentucky	LP Field • Nashville, Tennessee	ESPNU	**W** 14–3	24,599	
September 3	12:00 pm	Utah State	No. 23 **Auburn**	Jordan–Hare Stadium • Auburn, Alabama	ESPN	**W** 42–38	85,245	
September 3	12:21 pm	Kent State	No. 2 **Alabama**	Bryant–Denny Stadium • Tuscaloosa, Alabama	SEC Network	**W** 48–7	101,821	
September 3	4:45 pm	BYU	**Mississippi**	Vaught–Hemingway Stadium • Oxford, Mississippi	ESPN	**L** 14–13	55,124	
September 3	6:00 pm	Montana	**Tennessee**	Neyland Stadium • Knoxville, Tennessee	PPV	**W** 42–16	94,661	
September 3	7:00 pm	Missouri State	No. 15 **Arkansas**	Donald W. Reynolds Razorback Stadium • Fayetteville, Arkansas	PPV	**W** 51–7	70,607	
September 3	7:00 pm	Florida Atlantic	No. 22 **Florida**	Ben Hill Griffin Stadium • Gainesville, Florida	ESPNU	**W** 41–3	88,708	
September 3	7:00 pm	East Carolina	No. 12 **South Carolina**	Bank of America Stadium • Charlotte, North Carolina	FSN	**W** 56–37	58,272	
September 3	7:00 pm	Elon	**Vanderbilt**	Vanderbilt Stadium • Nashville, Tennessee	CSS	**W** 45–14	27,599	
September 3	8:00 pm	No. 3 Oregon	No. 4 **LSU**	Cowboys Stadium • Arlington, Texas	ABC	**W** 40–27	87,711	
September 3	8:00 pm	No. 5 Boise State	No. 19 **Georgia**	Georgia Dome • Atlanta (Chick-fil-A Kickoff Game)	ESPN	**L** 35–21	73,614	

Players of the week:

Offensive		Defensive		Special teams	
Player	Team	Player	Team	Player	Team
Vick Ballard	Mississippi State	Tyrann Mathieu	LSU	Joe Adams	Arkansas

=== Week Two ===
Date	Time	Visiting team	Home team	Site	Broadcast	Result	Attendance	Reference
September 10	12:00 pm	Central Michigan	**Kentucky**	Commonwealth Stadium • Lexington, Kentucky	ESPNU	**W** 27–13	58,022	
September 10	12:20 pm	No. 16 **Mississippi State**	**Auburn**	Jordan–Hare Stadium • Auburn, Alabama	SEC Network	**AU** 41–34	87,451	
September 10	2:30 pm	No. 3 **Alabama**	No. 23 Penn State	Beaver Stadium • University Park, Pennsylvania	ABC	**W** 27–11	107,846	
September 10	3:30 pm	Cincinnati	**Tennessee**	Neyland Stadium • Knoxville, Tennessee	ESPN2	**W** 45–23	94,207	
September 10	4:30 pm	No. 12 **South Carolina**	**Georgia**	Sanford Stadium • Athens, Georgia	ESPN	**SC** 45–42	92,746	
September 10	7:00 pm	New Mexico	No. 14 **Arkansas**	War Memorial Stadium • Little Rock, Arkansas	ESPNU	**W** 52–3	52,606	
September 10	7:00 pm	UAB	No. 18 **Florida**	Ben Hill Griffin Stadium • Gainesville, Florida	FSN South	**W** 39–0	87,473	
September 10	7:00 pm	Southern Illinois	**Ole Miss**	Vaught–Hemingway Stadium • Oxford, Mississippi	PPV	**W** 42–24	58,504	
September 10	7:30 pm	Connecticut	**Vanderbilt**	Vanderbilt Stadium • Nashville, Tennessee	CSS	**W** 24–21	32,119	
September 10	8:00 pm	Northwestern State	No. 2 **LSU**	Tiger Stadium • Baton Rouge, Louisiana	PPV	**W** 49–3	92,405	

Players of the week:

Offensive		Defensive		Special teams	
Player	Team	Player	Team	Player	Team
Tyler Bray	Tennessee	Mark Barron	Alabama	Melvin Ingram	South Carolina

=== Week Three ===
Date	Time	Visiting team	Home team	Site	Broadcast	Result	Attendance	Reference
September 15	8:00 pm	No. 3 **LSU**	No. 25 **Mississippi State**	Davis Wade Stadium • Starkville, Mississippi	ESPN	**LSU** 19–6	56,924	
September 17	12:00 pm	No. 21 **Auburn**	Clemson	Memorial Stadium • Clemson, South Carolina	ESPN	**L** 38–24	82,000	
September 17	12:21 pm	**Ole Miss**	**Vanderbilt**	Vanderbilt Stadium • Nashville, Tennessee	SEC Network	**VU** 30–7	34,579	
September 17	1:00 pm	Coastal Carolina	**Georgia**	Sanford Stadium • Athens, Georgia	PPV	**W** 59–0	91,946	
September 17	3:30 pm	**Tennessee**	No. 16 **Florida**	Ben Hill Griffin Stadium • Gainesville, Florida	CBS	**FL** 33–23	90,744	
September 17	6:00 pm	Navy	No. 11 **South Carolina**	Williams-Brice Stadium • Columbia, South Carolina	ESPN2	**W** 24–21	78,807	
September 17	7:00 pm	Louisville	**Kentucky**	Commonwealth Stadium • Lexington, Kentucky	ESPNU	**L** 24–17	68,170	
September 17	7:30 pm	Troy	No. 14 **Arkansas**	Donald W. Reynolds Razorback Stadium • Fayetteville, Arkansas	CSS	**W** 38–28	69,861	
September 17	7:30 pm	North Texas	No. 2 **Alabama**	Bryant–Denny Stadium • Tuscaloosa, Alabama	FS South	**W** 41–0	101,821	

Players of the week:

Offensive		Defensive		Special teams	
Player	Team	Player	Team	Player	Team
Chris Rainey; Marcus Lattimore	Florida; South Carolina	Trey Wilson	Vanderbilt	Caleb Sturgis	Florida

=== Week Four ===
Date	Time	Visiting team	Home team	Site	Broadcast	Result	Attendance	Reference
September 24	12:30 pm	**Georgia**	**Ole Miss**	Vaught–Hemingway Stadium • Oxford, Mississippi	SEC Network	**UGA** 27–13	58,032	
September 24	3:30 pm	No. 14 **Arkansas**	No. 3 **Alabama**	Bryant–Denny Stadium • Tuscaloosa, Alabama	CBS	**ALA** 38–14	101,821	
September 24	7:00 pm	No. 15 **Florida**	**Kentucky**	Commonwealth Stadium • Lexington, Kentucky	ESPN	**FLA** 48–10	65,134	
September 24	7:00 pm	**Vanderbilt**	No. 12 **South Carolina**	Williams-Brice Stadium • Columbia, South Carolina	ESPN	**SCAR** 21–3	77,015	
September 24	7:00 pm	Florida Atlantic	**Auburn**	Jordan–Hare Stadium • Auburn, Alabama	FSN	**W** 30–14	82,249	
September 24	7:00 pm	Louisiana Tech	**Mississippi State**	Davis–Wade Stadium • Starkville, Mississippi	ESPNU	**W** 26–10	55,116	
September 24	8:00 pm	No. 2 **LSU**	No. 16 West Virginia	Mountaineer Field • Morgantown, West Virginia	ABC	**W** 47–21	62,056	

Players of the week:

Offensive		Defensive		Special teams	
Player	Team	Player	Team	Player	Team
Trent Richardson	Alabama	Melvin Ingram	South Carolina	Brad Wing	LSU

=== Week Five ===
Date	Time	Visiting team	Home team	Site	Broadcast	Result	Attendance	Reference
October 1	12:00 pm	**Mississippi State**	**Georgia**	Sanford Stadium • Athens, Georgia	FS South	**UGA** 24–10	92,746	
October 1	12:00 pm	No. 14 Texas A&M	No. 18 **Arkansas**	Cowboys Stadium • Arlington, Texas	ESPN	**W** 42–38	69,838	
October 1	12:21 pm	**Kentucky**	No. 1 **LSU**	Tiger Stadium • Baton Rouge, Louisiana	SEC Network	**LSU** 35–7	92,660	
October 1	12:30 pm	Buffalo	**Tennessee**	Neyland Stadium • Knoxville, Tennessee	CSS	**W** 41–10	87,758	
October 1	3:30 pm	**Auburn**	No. 10 **South Carolina**	Williams-Brice Stadium • Columbia, South Carolina	CBS	**AU** 16–13	81,767	
October 1	8:00 pm	No. 3 **Alabama**	No. 12 **Florida**	Ben Hill Griffin Stadium • Gainesville, Florida	CBS	**ALA** 38–10	90,888	
October 1	9:15 pm	**Ole Miss**	Fresno State	Bulldog Stadium • Fresno, California	ESPN2	**W** 38–28	32,063	

Players of the week:

Offensive		Defensive		Special teams	
Player	Team	Player	Team	Player	Team
Tyler Wilson; Jarius Wright	Arkansas	Melvin Ingram	South Carolina	Steven Clark	Auburn

=== Week Six ===
Date	Time	Visiting team	Home team	Site	Broadcast	Result	Attendance	Reference
October 8	12:00 pm	**Mississippi State**	UAB	Legion Field • Birmingham, Alabama	FS South	**W** 21–3	28,351	
October 8	12:21 pm	**Kentucky**	No. 18 **South Carolina**	Williams-Brice Stadium • Columbia, South Carolina	SEC Network	**SCAR** 54–3	75,838	
October 8	3:30 pm	No. 17 **Florida**	No. 1 **LSU**	Tiger Stadium • Baton Rouge, Louisiana	CBS	**LSU** 41–11	93,022	
October 8	7:00 pm	No. 15 **Auburn**	No. 10 **Arkansas**	Donald W. Reynolds Razorback Stadium • Fayetteville, Arkansas	ESPN	**ARK** 38–14	74,191	
October 8	7:00 pm	**Georgia**	**Tennessee**	Neyland Stadium • Knoxville, Tennessee	ESPN2	**UGA** 20–12	102,455	
October 8	7:00 pm	**Vanderbilt**	No. 2 **Alabama**	Bryant–Denny Stadium • Tuscaloosa, Alabama	ESPNU	**ALA** 34–0	101,821	

Players of the week:

Offensive		Defensive		Special teams	
Player	Team	Player	Team	Player	Team
Connor Shaw	South Carolina	Mike Gilliard	Georgia	Blair Walsh	Georgia

=== Week Seven ===
Date	Time	Visiting team	Home team	Site	Broadcast	Result	Attendance	Reference
October 15	12:21 pm	No. 15 **South Carolina**	**Mississippi State**	Davis Wade Stadium • Starkville, Mississippi	SEC Network	**SCAR** 14–12	55,418	
October 15	3:30 pm	No. 1 **LSU**	**Tennessee**	Neyland Stadium • Knoxville, Tennessee	CBS	**LSU** 38–7	101,822	
October 15	6:00 pm	No. 2 **Alabama**	**Ole Miss**	Vaught–Hemingway Stadium • Oxford, Mississippi	ESPN2	**ALA** 52–7	61,792	
October 15	7:00 pm	**Florida**	No. 24 **Auburn**	Jordan–Hare Stadium • Auburn, Alabama	ESPN	**AUB** 17–6	87,451	
October 15	7:00 pm	**Georgia**	**Vanderbilt**	Vanderbilt Stadium • Nashville, Tennessee	FS South	**UGA** 33–28	36,640	

Players of the week:

Offensive		Defensive		Special teams	
Player	Team	Player	Team	Player	Team
Trent Richardson	Alabama	Corey Lemonier; D. J. Swearinger	Auburn; South Carolina	Steven Clark	Auburn

=== Week Eight ===
Date	Time	Visiting team	Home team	Site	Broadcast	Result	Attendance	Reference
October 22	12:00 pm	Jacksonville State	**Kentucky**	Commonwealth Stadium • Lexington, Kentucky	ESPNU	**W** 38–14	54,098	
October 22	12:21 pm	No. 10 **Arkansas**	**Ole Miss**	Vaught–Hemingway Stadium • Oxford, Mississippi	SEC Network	**ARK** 29–24	57,951	
October 22	3:30 pm	No. 19 **Auburn**	No. 1 **LSU**	Tiger Stadium • Baton Rouge, Louisiana	CBS	**LSU** 45–10	93,098	
October 22	7:00 pm	Army	**Vanderbilt**	Vanderbilt Stadium • Nashville, Tennessee	ESPNU	**W** 44–21	32,210	
October 22	7:15 pm	**Tennessee**	No. 2 **Alabama**	Bryant–Denny Stadium • Tuscaloosa, Alabama	ESPN2	**ALA** 37–6	101,821	

Players of the week:

Offensive		Defensive		Special teams	
Player	Team	Player	Team	Player	Team
Dennis Johnson	Arkansas	Dont'a Hightower	Alabama	Brad Wing	LSU

=== Week Nine ===
Date	Time	Visiting team	Home team	Site	Broadcast	Result	Attendance	Reference
October 29	12:21 pm	No. 10 **Arkansas**	**Vanderbilt**	Vanderbilt Stadium • Nashville, Tennessee	SEC Network	**ARK** 31–28	33,247	
October 29	3:30 pm	No. 22 **Georgia**	**Florida**	EverBank Field • Jacksonville, Florida	CBS	**UGA** 24–20	84,524	
October 29	7:00 pm	**Ole Miss**	No. 23 **Auburn**	Jordan–Hare Stadium • Auburn, Alabama	ESPNU	**AUB** 41–23	85,347	
October 29	7:00 pm	**Mississippi State**	**Kentucky**	Commonwealth Stadium • Lexington, Kentucky	FS South	**MSU** 28–16	57,891	
October 29	7:15 pm	No. 13 **South Carolina**	**Tennessee**	Neyland Stadium • Knoxville, Tennessee	ESPN	**SCAR** 14–3	96,655	

Players of the week:

Offensive		Defensive		Special teams	
Player	Team	Player	Team	Player	Team
Michael Dyer	Auburn	Jerry Franklin; Jarvis Jones	Arkansas; Georgia	Zach Hocker	Arkansas

=== Week Ten ===
Date	Time	Visiting team	Home team	Site	Broadcast	Result	Attendance	Reference
November 5	12:21 pm	**Vanderbilt**	**Florida**	Ben Hill Griffin Stadium • Gainesville, Florida	SEC Network	**FLA** 26–21	90,144	
November 5	12:30 pm	New Mexico State	No. 18 **Georgia**	Sanford Stadium • Athens, Georgia	CSS	**W** 63–16	92,746	
November 5	3:30 pm	**Ole Miss**	**Kentucky**	Commonwealth Stadium • Lexington, Kentucky	ESPNU	**UK** 30–13	56,882	
November 5	7:00 pm	Middle Tennessee	**Tennessee**	Neyland Stadium • Knoxville, Tennessee	FS South	**W** 24–0	88,211	
November 5	7:15 pm	No. 9 **South Carolina**	No. 7 **Arkansas**	Donald W. Reynolds Razorback Stadium • Fayetteville, Arkansas	ESPN	**ARK** 44–28	73,804	
November 5	7:30 pm	UT Martin	**Mississippi State**	Davis Wade Stadium • Starkville, Mississippi	CSS	**W** 55–17	55,096	
November 5	8:00 pm	No. 1 **LSU**	No. 2 **Alabama**	Bryant–Denny Stadium • Tuscaloosa, Alabama	CBS	**LSU** 9–6 (OT)	101,821	

Players of the week:

Offensive		Defensive		Special teams	
Player	Team	Player	Team	Player	Team
Jeff Demps	Florida	Eric Reid	LSU	Dennis Johnson	Arkansas

=== Week Eleven ===
Date	Time	Visiting team	Home team	Site	Broadcast	Result	Attendance	Reference
November 12	12:00 pm	**Florida**	No. 13 **South Carolina**	Williams-Brice Stadium • Columbia, South Carolina	CBS	**SCAR** 17–12	80,250	
November 12	12:21 pm	**Kentucky**	**Vanderbilt**	Commodore Stadium • Nashville, Tennessee	SEC Network	**VU** 38–8	33,718	
November 12	3:30 pm	No. 20 **Auburn**	No. 15 **Georgia**	Sanford Stadium • Athens, Georgia	CBS	**UGA** 45–7	92,746	
November 12	6:00 pm	**Tennessee**	No. 8 **Arkansas**	Donald W. Reynolds Razorback Stadium • Fayetteville, Arkansas	ESPN2	**ARK** 49–7	72,103	
November 12	7:00 pm	Western Kentucky	No. 1 **LSU**	Tiger Stadium • Baton Rouge, Louisiana	ESPNU	**W** 42–9	92,917	
November 12	7:30 pm	Louisiana Tech	**Ole Miss**	Vaught-Hemigway Stadium • Oxford, Mississippi	CSS	**L** 7–27	44,123	
November 12	8:00 pm	No. 3 **Alabama**	**Mississippi State**	Davis Wade Stadium • Starkville, Mississippi	ESPN	**ALA** 24–7	57,871	

Players of the week:

Offensive		Defensive		Special teams	
Player	Team	Player	Team	Player	Team
Zac Stacy	Vanderbilt	Dont'a Hightower	Alabama	Joe Adams	Arkansas

=== Week Twelve ===
Date	Time	Visiting team	Home team	Site	Broadcast	Result	Attendance	Reference
November 19	12:00 pm	The Citadel	No. 12 **South Carolina**	Williams-Brice Stadium • Columbia, South Carolina	PPV	**W** 41–20	76,816	
November 19	12:21 pm	**Kentucky**	No. 14 **Georgia**	Sanford Stadium • Athens, Georgia	SEC Network	**UGA** 19–10	92,746	
November 19	1:00 pm	Samford	No. 24 **Auburn**	Jordan–Hare Stadium • Auburn, Alabama	PPV	**W** 45–7	84,842	
November 19	1:00 pm	Furman	**Florida**	Ben Hill Griffin Stadium • Gainesville, Florida	PPV	**W** 54–32	84,674	
November 19	1:07 pm	Georgia Southern	No. 3 **Alabama**	Bryant–Denny Stadium • Tuscaloosa, Alabama	PPV	**W** 45–21	101,821	
November 19	3:30 pm	**Mississippi State**	No. 6 **Arkansas**	War Memorial Stadium • Little Rock, Arkansas	CBS	**ARK** 44–17	55,761	
November 19	7:00 pm	No. 1 **LSU**	**Ole Miss**	Vaught–Hemingway Stadium • Oxford, Mississippi	ESPN	**LSU** 52–3	59,877	
November 19	7:00 pm	**Vanderbilt**	**Tennessee**	Neyland Stadium • Knoxville, Tennessee	ESPNU	**Tenn** 27–21 (OT)	91,367	

Players of the week:

Offensive		Defensive		Special teams	
Player	Team	Player	Team	Player	Team
Tyler Wilson	Arkansas	Ron Brooks; Danny Trevathan	LSU; Kentucky	Blair Walsh	Georgia

=== Week Thirteen ===
Date	Time	Visiting team	Home team	Site	Broadcast	Result	Attendance	Reference
November 25	3:30 pm	No. 3 **Arkansas**	No. 1 **LSU**	Tiger Stadium • Baton Rouge, Louisiana	CBS	**LSU** 41–17	93,108	
November 26	12:00 pm	No. 13 **Georgia**	No. 23 Georgia Tech	Bobby Dodd Stadium • Atlanta, Georgia	ESPN	**W** 31–17	54,925	
November 26	12:21 pm	**Tennessee**	**Kentucky**	Commonwealth Stadium • Lexington, Kentucky	SEC Network	**UK** 10–7	59,855	
November 26	3:30 pm	No. 2 **Alabama**	No. 24 **Auburn**	Jordan–Hare Stadium • Auburn, Alabama	CBS	**ALA** 42–14	87,451	
November 26	3:30 pm	**Vanderbilt**	Wake Forest	BB&T Field • Winston-Salem, North Carolina	ESPNU	**W** 41–7	28,020	
November 26	7:00 pm	Florida State	**Florida**	Ben Hill Griffin Stadium • Gainesville, Florida	ESPN2	**L** 21–7	90,798	
November 26	7:00 pm	**Ole Miss**	**Mississippi State**	Davis Wade Stadium • Starkville, Mississippi	ESPNU	**MSU** 31–3	55,270	
November 26	7:45 pm	No. 17 Clemson	No. 12 **South Carolina**	Williams-Brice Stadium • Columbia, South Carolina	ESPN	**W** 34–13	83,442	

Players of the week:

Offensive		Defensive		Special teams	
Player	Team	Player	Team	Player	Team
Trent Richardson; Connor Shaw	Alabama; South Carolina	Tyrann Mathieu	LSU	Ryan Tydlacka	Kentucky

=== Week Fourteen/SEC Championship ===
Date	Time	Visiting team	Home team	Site	Broadcast	Result	Attendance	Reference
December 3	4:00 pm	No. 14 **Georgia**	No. 1 **LSU**	Georgia Dome • Atlanta, Georgia	CBS	**LSU** 42–10	74,515	

== SEC vs. AQ conference and BCS-buster opponents ==
NOTE:. Games with a * next to the home team represent a neutral site game

Date	Visitor	Home	Significance	Winning team
September 3	Boise State	Georgia*	Chick-fil-A Kickoff Game in Atlanta	Boise State
September 3	Oregon	LSU*	Cowboys Classic in Arlington, Texas	LSU
September 10	Alabama	Penn State	Alabama–Penn State football rivalry	Alabama
September 10	Cincinnati	Tennessee		Tennessee
September 10	Connecticut	Vanderbilt		Vanderbilt
September 17	Auburn	Clemson	Auburn–Clemson football rivalry	Clemson
September 17	Louisville	Kentucky	Governor's Cup	Louisville
September 24	LSU	West Virginia		LSU
October 1	Texas A&M	Arkansas*	Southwest Classic in Arlington, Texas	Arkansas
November 26	Florida State	Florida	Florida–Florida State football rivalry	Florida State
November 26	Georgia	Georgia Tech	Clean, Old-Fashioned Hate	Georgia
November 26	Clemson	South Carolina	Battle of the Palmetto State	South Carolina
November 26	Vanderbilt	Wake Forest		Vanderbilt

== Home attendance ==
Team	Stadium	Capacity	Game 1	Game 2	Game 3	Game 4	Game 5	Game 6	Game 7	Game 8	Total	Average	% of Capacity
Alabama	Bryant–Denny Stadium	101,821	101,821	101,821	101,821	101,821	101,821	101,821	101,821	—	712,747	101,821	100%
Arkansas	Razorback Stadium	72,000	70,607	52,606^{A}	69,861	74,191	73,804	72,103	55,761^{A}	—	468,933	72,120	100.15%
Auburn	Jordan–Hare Stadium	87,451	85,245	87,451	82,249	87,451	85,347	84,842	87,451	—	600,036	85,719	98.02%
Florida	Ben Hill Griffin Stadium	88,548	88,708	87,473	90,744	90,888	90,144	84,674	90,798	—	623,429	89,061	100.58%
Georgia	Sanford Stadium	92,746	92,746	91,946	92,746	92,746	92,746	92,746	—	—	555,676	92,612	99.86%
Kentucky	Commonwealth Stadium	67,606	58,022	68,170	65,134	54,098	57,891	56,882	59,855	—	420,052	60,007	88.76%
LSU	Tiger Stadium	92,542	92,405	92,660	93,022	93,098	92,917	93,108	—	—	557,210	92,868	100.35%
Mississippi State	Davis Wade	55,082	56,924	55,116	55,418	55,096	57,871	55,270	—	—	335,695	55,949	101.57%
Ole Miss	Vaught–Hemingway	60,580	55,124	58,504	58,042	61,792	57,951	44,123	59,877	—	395,413	56,488	93.25%
South Carolina	Williams-Brice Stadium	80,250	78,807	77,015	81,767	75,838	80,250	76,816	83,442	—	553,935	79,134	98.61%
Tennessee	Neyland Stadium	102,455	94,661	94,207	87,758	102,455	101,822	96,655	88,211	91,367	757,136	94,642	92.37%
Vanderbilt	Vanderbilt Stadium	39,790	27,599	32,119	34,579	36,640	32,210	33,247	33,718	—	230,112	32,873	82.62%

^AGames played at Arkansas' secondary home stadium War Memorial Stadium, capacity: 54,120.

Attendance was 84,524 for the Georgia vs. Florida game in Jacksonville

== Bowl games ==
SEC Bowl Games
Pick	Game	Date	Location/Time*	Television	Winner^{+}	Score	Loser^{+}	Score	Payout (US$) per team
BCS No. 1 vs. No. 2	2012 BCS National Championship Game	Jan. 9, 2012	Mercedes-Benz Superdome; New Orleans	ESPN	**#2 Alabama**	21	**#1 LSU**	0	$21,200,000
2.	Capital One Bowl	Jan. 2, 2012	Citrus Bowl; Orlando, Florida; 1:00 pm	ESPN	**#10 South Carolina**	30	No. 21 Nebraska	13	$4,250,000
3.	Outback Bowl	Jan. 2, 2012	Raymond James Stadium; Tampa, Florida; 1:00 pm	ABC	No. 12 Michigan State	33	No. 18 **Georgia**	30	$3,400,000
4.	AT&T Cotton Bowl Classic	Jan. 6, 2012	Cowboys Stadium; Arlington, Texas; 8:00 pm	FOX	No. 7 **Arkansas**	29	No. 11 Kansas State	16	$6,750,000
5.	Chick-fil-A Bowl	Dec. 31, 2011	Georgia Dome; Atlanta; 7:30 pm	ESPN	**Auburn**	43	Virginia	24	$3,350,000
6.	Gator Bowl	Jan. 2, 2012	EverBank Field; Jacksonville, Florida; 1:30 pm	ESPN2	**Florida**	24	Ohio State	17	$2,250,000
7.	Autozone Liberty Bowl	Dec. 31, 2011	Liberty Bowl Memorial Stadium; Memphis, Tennessee; 3:30 pm	ESPN	Cincinnati	31	**Vanderbilt**	24	$1,350,000
8.	Franklin Music City Bowl	Dec. 30, 2011	LP Field; Nashville, Tennessee; 6:40 pm	ESPN	**Mississippi State**	23	Wake Forest	17	$1,700,000
*Time given is Eastern Time (UTC-5).^{+}SEC team is **bolded**. Rankings are AP.

Per BCS selection rules, no more than two teams from a conference may be selected, regardless of whether they are automatic qualifiers or at-large selections, unless two non-champions from the same conference are ranked No. 1 and No. 2 in the final BCS Standings. As the SEC champion Louisiana State was the top-ranked team in the BCS poll, the Sugar Bowl was prohibited from selecting an SEC representative for the 2011–12 season.

== Post-season awards and honors ==
=== All-SEC ===
The following players were named by the AP All-SEC team:

Position	Player	Class	Team
First Team Offense
QB	Tyler Wilson	Jr.	Arkansas
RB	Trent Richardson	Jr.	Alabama
RB	Michael Dyer	So.	Auburn
WR	Jarius Wright	Sr.	Arkansas
WR	Da'Rick Rogers	So.	Tennessee
TE	Orson Charles	Jr.	Georgia
OL	Will Blackwell	Sr.	LSU
OL	Cordy Glenn	Sr.	Georgia
OL	Barrett Jones	So.	Alabama
OL	Rokevious Watkins	Sr.	South Carolina
C	William Vlachos	Sr.	Alabama
First Team Defense
DL	Melvin Ingram	Sr.	South Carolina
DL	Fletcher Cox	Jr.	Mississippi State
DL	Malik Jackson	Sr.	Tennessee
DL	Sam Montgomery	So.	LSU
LB	Jarvis Jones	So.	Georgia
LB	Danny Trevathan	Sr.	Kentucky
LB	Courtney Upshaw	Sr.	Alabama
DB	Tyrann Mathieu	So.	LSU
DB	Morris Claiborne	Jr.	LSU
DB	Mark Barron	Sr.	Alabama
DB	Bacarri Rambo	Jr.	Georgia
First Team Special Teams
K	Caleb Sturgis	Jr.	Florida
P	Brad Wing	Fr.	LSU
AP	Joe Adams	Sr.	Arkansas

=== All-Americans ===
Running back

- Trent Richardson, Alabama (AFCA-Coaches)

Defensive end

- Melvin Ingram, South Carolina (AFCA-Coaches)

Tight end

- Orson Charles, Georgia (AFCA-Coaches)

Linebacker

- Dont'a Hightower, Alabama (AFCA-Coaches)
- Jarvis Jones, Georgia (AFCA-Coaches)

Offensive guard

- Barrett Jones, Alabama (AFCA-Coaches)

Secondary

- Mark Barron, Alabama (AFCA-Coaches)
- Morris Claiborne, LSU (AFCA-Coaches)
- DeQuan Menzie, Alabama (AFCA-Coaches)

=== National award winners ===
The following SEC players listed below have been named to the national award semifinalist and finalist lists.
