= Campus of Elon University =

College campus in Elon, North Carolina, US

Coordinates: 36.103°N 79.501°W

The Elon University campus is a 636-acre (2.57 km^{2}) campus in Elon, North Carolina, United States. The campus is located mostly along East Haggard Avenue between Manning Avenue and North Oak Avenue, and North Williamson Avenue between the railroad tracks and University Drive. Other minor streets travel through and into campus. The campus is about three miles (5 km) from Interstate 40/85 and abuts the city of Burlington.

== Academic buildings ==
=== Alamance Building ===
Alamance building sits south of Fonville Fountain and faces Scott Plaza.

Alamance Building was opened in the Fall of 1925, named for the citizens of Alamance County. It is the center of the historic central quad, facing Scott Plaza and Fonville Fountain. Houses Registrar, Bursar, and Provost office on the first floor and classrooms on the second and third floors. It is also home for several departments: Academic Affairs, Business, Finance and Technology, English, Human Services Study, Institutional Research and Student Life.

=== Carlton Building ===
The Carlton Building was opened in 1925 and named for the Carlton family of trustees. This building is another part of the historic central quad. It is home to the Department of World Languages and Cultures, the "El Centro" Spanish Language Center, computer labs, classrooms, and faculty offices.

=== Center for the Arts ===
Elon's performing arts department (theatre, music, technical production, and dance) is housed here. It is a 75,000-square-foot facility for both teaching and performance. The main three theatres are McCrary Theatre, the Yeager Recital Hall, and Black Box Theatre. The McCrary Theatre, known as the "centerpiece stage", is a 600-seat theatre and concert hall. The Yeager Recital Hall is a theatre seating 335 people. Lastly, the Black Box Theatre is a theatre seating 100 people. The Center for the Arts also includes modular practice rooms and studios, rehearsal rooms, a complete scenery shop and costume shop, computer labs, classrooms and Steinway concert grand pianos. Lastly, this facility contains three dance/rehearsal studios, providing additional space for rehearsal and instruction.

=== Duke Building ===
Opened in 1927, the Duke Building is home to the Mathematics and Statistics Department, the Office of Academic Advising, in addition to classrooms and student gathering spaces. It is one of the oldest buildings on campus and is located along Scott Plaza and in proximity to Fonville Fountain.

=== Koury Business Center ===
Built in 2006, the business center was named for former Elon trustee Ernest A. Koury by his brother Maurice J Koury, both of whom are prominent business leaders in Alamance County and the surrounding region. The Koury Business Center houses the Martha and Spencer Love School of Business and its related academic departments. The building includes: The William Garrard Reed Finance Center, Porter Family Professional Development Center, LaRose Digital Theatre, and many classrooms, computer labs, and faculty offices.

=== Long Building ===
The Long Building, located along E Lebanon Avenue and directly behind the Alamance Building, serves as the new home for the MA in Interactive Media Graduate Program as well as the home of the Sport and Event Management Department after receiving a significant renovation in 2017.

=== Mooney Building ===
The Mooney Building is home to the School of Education on Elon University's campus and it is located in the historic area near central campus. Mooney Building is home to the School of Education as well as the Center for Access and Success and the other community outreach programs offered by the university.

=== Powell Building ===
Powell Building is one of the oldest buildings on campus and is home to the Office of the President and the Provost, as well as numerous other faculty offices and classrooms.

=== McMichael Building ===
Opened in 1998 and named after Dalton L. McMichael, Sr., the McMichael Building of Science holds the departments of Chemistry, Biology, Physics, Engineering, and Biochemistry. It houses 17 high-tech laboratories that give students a highly interactive learning experience in the sciences. It features three floors of office space and classrooms and a basement with a fully stocked cadaver lab. It is one of the only undergraduate programs in the United States that has real cadavers for research. There is also exceptional equipment, such as a nuclear magnetic resonance spectrometer, that students are given access to in order to further their education. There is also a separate greenhouse built for research and observation.

=== McEwen Communications Building ===
The McEwen Communications Building was originally opened in 1968 and is named after trustee Iris Holt McEwen. It is one of four new facilities for the School of Communications at Elon University and is home to the Jane and Brian Williams Studio, the Elon News Network newsroom, editing suites, classrooms, and faculty offices.

=== Sankey Hall ===
Sankey Hall, serves as the second home for the Martha and Spencer Love School of Business. The facility houses both the Doherty Center for Entrepreneurial Leadership and the Chandler Family Professional Sales Center as well as two new academic centers focused on design thinking and financial education.

=== Schar Hall ===
Schar Hall, a new addition to the School of Communications, built in 2016 serves as one of four new buildings in an academic quad "Under the Oaks". The facility houses numerous attractions such as the Snow Family Grand Atrium, Turner Theatre, the offices of Live Oak Communications, as well as numerous student gathering spaces, faculty offices, and classrooms.

=== Steers Pavilion ===
This addition to the School of Communications is home to the Imagining the Internet Center as well as numerous faculty offices and a classroom. Steers Pavilion is located to the left of the newly constructed Schar Hall and behind Whitley Auditorium.

== Athletic and recreational facilities ==
=== Koury Center ===
The Koury Center is home to the student recreational facilities and houses Alumni Gym, the Stewart Fitness Center, Belk Pool, as well as many other sports facilities, offices, and classrooms.

=== Rhodes Stadium ===
Rhodes Stadium is the football stadium for Elon University and has a capacity to seat 11,250 people. It is home to McKinnon Field.

=== Schar Center ===
The Schar Center, located at the north end of campus, was recently completed in 2018. The arena seats 5,100 people and is 160,000 square feet. It is home to both the NCAA D1 Men's and Women's Basketball and Volleyball teams. This facility provides a location for the University to host numerous events, from convocation to guest speakers.

== Residential Neighborhoods ==
=== Academic Village ===
Two pavilions in the Academic Village, in addition to housing classrooms on the lower floor, have suite-style co-ed dormitories on both floors.

- William R. Kenan, Jr. Honors Pavilion
- Isabella Cannon International Studies Pavilion

=== Colonnades Neighborhood ===
The Colonnades Neighborhood consists of five buildings, Story Hall, Moffitt Hall, Allen Hall, Staley Hall, and Kivette Hall as well as the EcoVillage at Loy Farm. The neighborhood is located directly behind the Koury Business Center and houses both first and second year students in dormitories and apartments.

=== Danieley Center ===
The Danieley Center is a large residential neighborhood consisting of 16 apartment and dormitory style buildings anchored by Lake Verona, the Violet Hoffman Daniel Commons Building, and the PARC Danieley Recreation Facility.

=== Global Neighborhood ===
The Global Neighborhood is nationally recognized for its method of engaged living and learning and its emphasis of global engagement. Anchored by the Global Commons Building, Great Hall, and Lake Mary Nell, the five residence halls house students in dormitory style living arrangements.

=== Historic Neighborhood ===
The Historic Neighborhood is the oldest neighborhood on campus and is home to the "campus core" of Elon University. There are eight residence halls in this neighborhood; Carolina, Smith, Hook, Brannock, Barney, West, Virginia, and Sloan.

=== Oaks Neighborhood ===
The Oaks Neighborhood consists of six apartment style buildings; Williams Hall, Council Hall, Brown Hall, Sullivan Hall, amongst other buildings. The Oaks primarily houses upperclassmen and is centrally located in close proximity to Downtown Elon.

=== Station at Mill Point ===
The Station at Mill Point is a new addition to campus located on the southern end of S Williamson Avenue. The 25 building townhome style neighborhood services primarily juniors and seniors and is home to the Depot Commons Building and numerous student amenities.

=== East Neighborhood ===
The East Neighborhood, located along E Haggard in the eastern end of campus, is the newest neighborhood at the University. The neighborhood includes three residential dorms, primarily for first-years. It officially opened in the fall of 2018.

== Dining facilities ==
=== McEwen Dining Hall ===
The McEwen Dining Hall, which was renovated in 2018, is located directly next to the McEwen Hall in the Historic Neighborhood. The building is home to the McEwen Dining Hall, Pei Wei Asian Diner, and the Village Juice Company.

=== Acorn Coffee Shop ===
The Acorn Coffee Shop is a cafe inside of the Belk Library. It was formerly adjacent to The Oak House on N. Williamson Ave. It offers an assortment of sandwiches, coffee, soup, and pastries.

=== Lakeside Dining Hall ===
Lakeside Dining Hall is connected to Moseley Student Center offers a locally inspired salad bar, vegetarian & gluten- free entrees, grill items, comfort foods, and an international station. The international station features authentic dishes from a different country or region each week.

=== Winter Garden Cafe ===
Located in the new extension of Moseley Center (next door to Lakeside), Winter Garden Cafe offers a range of retail dining options: Freshii (soups, salads, rice bowls, frozen yogurt, etc.), Biscuitville, and Flat Out flatbreads.

=== Irazú Coffee ===
A coffee shop located in Moseley Center.

=== Java City ===
A coffee shop located on the second floor of Koury Business Center.

=== Danieley Center Commons ===
Daniel Commons is the anchor building for the Danieley Center. This building houses numerous student gathering spaces as well as Qdoba Mexican Grill and Einstein Bros. Bagels.

=== Clohan Dining Hall ===
The Clohan Dining Hall building, formerly known as Colonnades or “Nades”, is a two-story building that hosts several dining services. The first floor consists of Fountain Market: a Boar's Head deli, Croutons (a salad bar), and a convenience store with items ranging from food to toiletries. The second floor is divided into two distinct dining venues; Clohan Dining Hall and Green World at 1889.

== Miscellaneous buildings ==
=== Moseley Center ===
The Moseley Campus Center is the central location for all student life at Elon University. Located at the North End of Young Commons, the building is home to numerous offices for Student Organizations such as Student Union Board (SUB), Student Government Association (SGA), amongst many other offices. The Center for Race, Ethnicity, and Diversity Education, the Gender and LGBTQIA Center, the Office for Fraternity and Sorority Life, the Kernodle Center for Service Learning, and the Student Professional Development Center are all housed here.

=== Carol Grotnes Belk Library ===
Belk Library is the main library of the university. It houses an academic collection, Archives and Special Collections, the Writing Center, Media Services, Event & Space Management, and Teaching & Learning Technologies. The Koenigsberger Learning Center, added in 2018, houses Academic Advising, Learning Assistance, and Disability Services.

=== LaRose Student Commons ===
On September 16, 2019, the University opened up the LaRose commons, a common recreation space for students in the Historic and East neighborhoods. The building includes a kitchen, vending machines, and a large event space.
