= 2011 Southern Conference football season =

- League: NCAA Division I FCS (Football Championship Subdivision)
- Sport: football
- Duration: September 1, 2011 through January 9, 2011
- Teams: 9
- TV partner: SoConTV
- Season champions: Georgia Southern

Southern Conference football seasons
- ← 2010 2012 →

2011 Southern Conference football standings
	Conf.			Overall
Team	W		L	W		L
No. 3 Georgia Southern $^	7	–	1	11	–	3
No. 12 Wofford ^	6	–	2	8	–	4
No. 9 Appalachian State ^	6	–	2	8	–	4
Furman	5	–	3	6	–	5
Samford	4	–	4	6	–	5
Chattanooga	3	–	5	5	–	6
Elon	3	–	5	5	–	6
The Citadel	2	–	6	4	–	7
Western Carolina	0	–	8	1	–	10
$ – Conference champion; ^ – FCS playoff participant; Rankings from The Sports Network poll

The 2011 Southern Conference football season began on Thursday, September 1, 2011 with Western Carolina visiting Georgia Southern. The season ended in the semifinals of the NCAA Division I Football Championship, with Georgia Southern losing to North Dakota State.

== Preseason ==
New coaches - Furman

=== Preseason Poll Results ===
First place votes in parentheses

Media	Coaches
Georgia Southern (15)	Appalachian State (5)
Appalachian State (13)	Georgia Southern (3)
Wofford (2)	Wofford
Chattanooga	Chattanooga (1)
Furman	Elon
Elon	Furman
Samford	Samford
Western Carolina	The Citadel
The Citadel	Western Carolina

=== Preseason All-Conference Teams ===
Offensive Player of the Year: Eric Breitenstein, Jr., FB, Wofford
Co-Defensive Players of the Year: Ameet Pall, Sr., DL, Wofford & Brent Russell, Jr., DL, Georgia Southern

First team offense
Position	Player	Class	Team
QB	DeAndre Presley	Sr.	Appalachian State
RB	Robert Brown	So.	Georgia Southern
RB	Eric Breitstein	Jr.	Wofford
WR	Aaron Mellette	Jr.	Elon
WR	Joel Bradford	Sr.	Chattanooga
TE	Ben Jorden	Sr.	Appalachian State
OL	Orry Frye	Sr.	Appalachian State
OL	Rodney Austin	Sr.	Elon
OL	Ryan Lee	Sr.	Furman
OL	Brett Moore	Sr.	Georgia Southern
OL	Nate Page	Sr.	Wofford

First team defense
Position	Player	Class	Team
DL	John Rizor	Jr.	Appalachian State
DL	Brent Russell	Jr.	Georgia Southern
DL	Alex Davis	Sr.	Samford
DL	Ameet Pall	Sr.	Wofford
LB	Kadarron Anderson	Sr.	Furman
LB	Josh Rowe	Jr.	Georgia Southern
LB	Ryan Consiglio	Sr.	Chattanooga
DB	Ed Gainey	Sr.	Appalachian State
DB	Ryan Steed	Sr.	Furman
DB	Derek Heyden	Sr.	Georgia Southern
DB	Laron Scott	Sr.	Georgia Southern

First Team Special Teams
Position	Player	Class	Team
K	Ray Early	So.	Furman
P	Charlie Edwards	Sr.	Georgia Southern
RS	Laron Scott	Sr.	Georgia Southern

== Rankings ==
Legend
Increase in ranking
Decrease in ranking
Not ranked previous week

		Pre	Wk 1	Wk 2	Wk 3	Wk 4	Wk 5	Wk 6	Wk 7	Wk 8	Wk 9	Wk 10	Wk 11	Final
Appalachian State	TSN	2	3	3	3	3	8	7	6	5	3	10	9	9
Appalachian State	C	2	3	3	3	3	8	7	6	5	3	8	8	8
Chattanooga	TSN	21	23	14	13	15	24	RV	RV	RV	-	RV	RV	RV
Chattanooga	C	23	25	17	14	17	23	RV	RV	RV	-	RV	-	RV
The Citadel	TSN	-	RV	RV	-	-	-	-	-	-	-	-	-	-
The Citadel	C	-	RV	-	-	-	-	-	-	-	-	-	-	-
Elon	TSN	-	RV	RV	RV	RV	RV	RV	-	-	-	-	RV	-
Elon	C	-	-	-	-	-	-	RV	-	-	-	-	-	-
Furman	TSN	-	RV	RV	-	RV	-	-	-	RV	RV	17	24	-
Furman	C	-	-	RV	-	-	-	-	-	RV	RV	21	-	-
Georgia Southern	TSN	4	2	1	1	1	1	1	1	1	5	4	3	3
Georgia Southern	C	3	2	1	1	1	1	1	1	1	4	3	2	2
Samford	TSN	-	-	RV	-	-	-	-	-	-	-	-	-	-
Samford	C	-	-	-	-	-	-	-	-	-	-	-	-	-
Western Carolina	TSN	-	-	-	-	-	-	-	-	-	-	-	-	-
Western Carolina	C	-	-	-	-	-	-	-	-	-	-	-	-	-
Wofford	TSN	8	7	9	9	8	5	5	5	12	11	9	13	12
Wofford	C	8	9	8	8	6	4	4	4	9	9	9	12	11

== Regular season ==
Index to colors and formatting
SoCon member won
SoCon member lost
SoCon teams in **bold**

All times Eastern time.

Rankings reflect that of the Sports Network poll for that week.

=== Week One ===
Date	Time	Visiting team	Home team	Site	Broadcast	Result	Attendance	Reference
September 1	7:30 p.m.	**Western Carolina**	Georgia Tech	Bobby Dodd Stadium • Atlanta, GA	ESPN3	**L** 21–63	42,132	
September 3	12:30 p.m.	**#2 Appalachian State**	#13 Virginia Tech	Lane Stadium • Blacksburg, VA		**L** 13–66	66,233	
September 3	1:30 p.m.	**#8 Wofford**	Presbyterian	Bailey Memorial Stadium • Clinton, SC		**W** 14-13	5,108	
September 3	3:30 p.m.	**#23 Chattanooga**	Nebraska	Memorial Stadium • Lincoln, NE	BTN	**L** 7–40	84,883	
September 3	6:00 p.m.	**Furman**	Coastal Carolina	Brooks Stadium • Conway, SC		**L** 23–30	8,633	
September 3	6:00 p.m.	Jacksonville	**The Citadel**	Johnson Hagood Stadium • Charleston, SC		**W** 31–9	12,099	
September 3	7:00 p.m.	**#3 Georgia Southern**	**Samford**	Seibert Stadium • Homewood, AL		**GSU** 31–17	8,714	
September 3	7:30 p.m.	**Elon**	Vanderbilt	Vanderbilt Stadium • Nashville, TN		**L** 14–45	27,599	

Players of the week:

Offensive		Defensive		Freshman		Special teams	
Player	Team	Player	Team	Player	Team	Player	Team
Jerodis Williams	Furman	Alvin Scioneaux	Wofford	Deion Stanley	Georgia Southern	Sam Martin	Appalachian State

=== Week Two ===
Date	Time	Visiting team	Home team	Site	Broadcast	Result	Attendance	Reference
September 10	3:30 p.m.	**#7 Wofford**	Clemson	Memorial Stadium • Clemson, SC	ESPN3	**L** 27–35	73,500	
September 10	12:30 p.m.	North Carolina A&T	**#3 Appalachian State**	Kidd Brewer Stadium • Boone, NC		**W** 58–6	26,415	
September 10	1:30 p.m.	#10 Jacksonville St	**#23 Chattanooga**	Finley Stadium • Chattanooga, TN		**W** 38-17	12,185	
September 10	3:30 p.m.	Tusculum	**#2 Georgia Southern**	Paulson Stadium • Statesboro, GA		**W** 62–21	21,812	
September 10	6:00 p.m.	**Furman**	**The Citadel**	Johnson Hagood Stadium • Charleston, SC	ESPN3	**FU** 16–6	13,414	
September 10	6:00 p.m.	Mars Hill	**Western Carolina**	E.J. Whitmire Stadium • Cullowhee, NC		**W** 52–31	7,789	
September 10	7:00 p.m.	Concord	**Elon**	Rhodes Stadium • Elon, NC		**W** 42–10	8,712	
September 10	7:00 p.m.	Stillman	**Samford**	Seibert Stadium • Homewood, AL		**W** 48–6	5,942	

Players of the week:

Offensive		Defensive		Freshman		Special teams	
Player	Team	Player	Team	Player	Team	Player	Team
Joel Bradford	Chattanooga	Wes Douthard	Chattanooga	Shaun Warren	Western Carolina	Chas Short	Furman

=== Week Three ===
Date	Time	Visiting team	Home team	Site	Broadcast	Result	Attendance	Reference
September 17	6:00 p.m.	Savannah State	**#3 Appalachian State**	Kidd Brewer Stadium • Boone, NC		**W** 41–6	24,917	
September 17	6:00 p.m.	**#14 Chattanooga**	Eastern Kentucky	Roy Kidd Stadium • Richmond, KY		**W** 23–14	10,100	
September 17	6:00 p.m.	**Elon**	North Carolina Central	O'Kelly–Riddick Stadium • Durham, NC		**W** 23–22	6,722	

Players of the week:

Offensive		Defensive		Freshman		Special teams	
Player	Team	Player	Team	Player	Team	Player	Team
Aaron Mellette	Elon	Wes Douthard	Chattanooga	Marquis Green	Chattanooga	Sam Martin	Appalachian State

=== Week Four ===
Date	Time	Visiting team	Home team	Site	Broadcast	Result	Attendance	Reference
September 24	1:00 p.m.	Presbyterian	**Furman**	Paladin Stadium • Greenville, SC	CSS	**W** 62–21	12,139	
September 24	1:30 p.m.	**The Citadel**	**Elon**	Rhodes Stadium • Elon, NC		**EU** 18–15 (OT)	10,883	
September 24	3:30 p.m.	**#13 Chattanooga**	**#3 Appalachian State**	Kidd Brewer Stadium • Boone, NC		**ASU** 14–12	27,304	
September 24	6:00 p.m.	**Western Carolina**	**#1 Georgia Southern**	Paulson Stadium • Greenville, SC		**GSU** 52–20	19,067	
September 24	7:00 p.m.	**Samford**	**#9 Wofford**	Gibbs Stadium • Spartanburg, SC		**WC** 38–23	7,329	

Players of the week:

Offensive		Defensive		Freshman		Special teams	
Player	Team	Player	Team	Player	Team	Player	Team
Chris Forcier	Furman	Jeremy Kimbrough	Appalachian State	Ezayi Youyoute	Georgia Southern	Adam Shreiner	Elon

=== Week Five ===
Date	Time	Visiting team	Home team	Site	Broadcast	Result	Attendance	Reference
October 1	1:30 p.m.	**#1 Georgia Southern**	**Elon**	Rhodes Stadium • Elon, NC		**GSU** 41–14	7,195	
October 1	3:00 p.m.	**Gardner–Webb**	**Samford**	Seibert Stadium• Homewood, AL		**W** 41–14	7,726	
October 1	3:00 p.m.	**#3 Appalachian State**	**#8 Wofford**	Gibbs Stadium • Spartanburg, SC	ESPN3	**WC** 28–14	10,329	
October 1	6:00 p.m.	**The Citadel**	**#15 Chattanooga**	Finley Stadium • Chattanooga, TN		**Cid** 28–27	10,727	
October 1	6:00 p.m.	**Furman**	**Western Carolina**	E.J Whitmire Stadium • Cullowhee, NC		**FU** 47–21	9,989	

Players of the week:

Offensive		Defensive		Freshman		Special teams	
Player	Team	Player	Team	Player	Team	Player	Team
Chris Forcier	Furman	Rob Harland	The Citadel	Dominique Swope	Georgia Southern	George Richardson	Western Carolina

=== Week Six ===
Date	Time	Visiting team	Home team	Site	Broadcast	Result	Attendance	Reference
October 8	1:00 p.m.	**#4 Wofford**	**The Citadel**	Johnson Hagood Stadium • Charleston, SC		**WC** 43–14	12,316	
October 8	1:30 p.m.	**Samford**	**Furman**	Paladin Stadium • Greenville, SC		**SU** 26–21	9,152	
October 8	3:00 p.m.	**Chattanooga**	**#1 Georgia Southern**	Paulson Stadium • Statesboro, GA		**GSU** 28–27	20,593	
October 8	3:00 p.m.	**Elon**	**Western Carolina**	E.J. Whitmire Stadium • Cullowhee, NC		**EU** 38–31	5,239	

Players of the week:

Offensive		Defensive		Freshman		Special teams	
Robert Brown	Georgia Southern	Alvin Hines	Samford	Terrell Robinson	Chattanooga	Brenton Bersin	Wofford

=== Week Seven ===
Date	Time	Visiting team	Home team	Site	Broadcast	Result	Attendance	Reference
October 15	1:30 p.m.	UVA–Wise	**#4 Wofford**	Gibbs Stadium • Spartanburg, SC		**W** 47–14	6,290	
October 15	2:00 p.m.	**#6 Appalachian State**	**The Citadel**	Johnson Hagood Stadium • Charleston, SC		**ASU** 49–42	14,154	
October 15	3:00 p.m.	**Furman**	**#1 Georgia Southern**	Paulson Stadium • Statesboro, GA		**GSU** 50–20	19,221	
October 15	3:00 p.m.	**Elon**	**Samford**	Seibert Stadium • Homewood, AL		**SU** 43–31	5,703	
October 15	6:00 p.m.	**Western Carolina**	**Chattanooga**	Finley Stadium • Chattanooga, TN		**UTC** 51–7	11,866	

Players of the week:

Offensive		Defensive		Freshman		Special teams	
Fabian Truss	Samford	Corey White	Samford	Terrell Robinson	Chattanooga	Adrian Mora	Georgia Southern

=== Week Eight ===
Date	Time	Visiting team	Home team	Site	Broadcast	Result	Attendance	Reference
October 22	2:00 p.m.	**#9 Wofford**	**Furman**	Paladin Stadium • Greenville, SC		**FU** 26–21	11,716	
October 22	2:00 p.m.	Presbyterian	**#1 Georgia Southern**	Paulson Stadium • Statesboro, GA		**W**48–14	16,392	
October 22	3:00 p.m.	**Chattanooga**	**Elon**	Rhodes Stadium • Elon, NC		**UTC** 42–18	9,294	
October 22	3:00 p.m.	**The Citadel**	**Western Carolina**	E.J. Whitmire Stadium • Cullowhee, NC		**Cid** 35–7	7,277	
October 22	3:30 p.m.	**Samford**	**#5 Appalachian State**	Kidd Brewer Stadium • Boone, NC		35–17	28,912	

Players of the week:

Offensive		Defensive		Freshman		Special teams	
Jerodis Williams	Furman	Wes Dothard	Chattanooga	Terrell Robinson	Chattanooga	Travaris Cadet	Appalachian State

=== Week Nine ===
Date	Time	Visiting team	Home team	Site	Broadcast	Result	Attendance	Reference
October 29	1:00 p.m.	VMI	**The Citadel**	Johnson Hagood Stadium • Charleston, SC		**W** 41–14	11,184	
October 29	1:30 p.m.	**Elon**	**#9 Wofford**	Gibbs Stadium • Spartanburg, SC		**WC** 48–28	8,611	
October 29	2:00 p.m.	**Furman**	**Chattanooga**	Finley Stadium • Chattanooga, TN		**FU** 14–7	9,239	
October 29	3:00 p.m.	**#1 Georgia Southern**	**#5 Appalachian State**	Kidd Brewer Stadium • Boone, NC		**ASU** 24–17	30,018	
October 29	3:00 p.m.	**Western Carolina**	**Samford**	Seibert Stadium • Homewood, AL		**SU** 52–24	6,317	

Players of the week:

Offensive		Defensive		Freshman		Special teams	
Eric Breitenstein	Wofford	Mitch McGrath	Furman	Ronald Blair	Appalachian State	Fabian Truss	Samford

=== Week Ten ===
Date	Time	Visiting team	Home team	Site	Broadcast	Result	Attendance	Reference
November 5	12:00 p.m.	**Chattanooga**	**Samford**	Seibert Stadium • Homewood, AL		**UTC** 24–9	6,522	
November 5	1:30 p.m.	**Appalachian State**	**Furman**	Paladin Stadium • Greenville, SC		**FU** 20–10	12,856	
November 5	2:00 p.m.	**The Citadel**	**Georgia Southern**	Paulson Stadium • Statesboro, GA		**GSU** 14–12	18,408	
November 5	3:00 p.m.	**Wofford**	**Western Carolina**	E.J. Whitmire Stadium • Cullowhee, NC		**WC** 42–24	4,770	

Players of the week:

Offensive		Defensive		Freshman		Special teams	
Chris Forcier	Furman	Josh Williams	Chattanooga	Deion Stanley	Georgia Southern	Joel Bradford	Chattanooga

=== Week Eleven ===
Date	Time	Visiting team	Home team	Site	Broadcast	Result	Attendance	Reference
November 12	1:00 p.m.	**Georgia Southern**	**Wofford**	Gibbs Stadium • Spartanburg, SC		**GSU** 31–10	10,280	
November 12	1:30 p.m.	**Elon**	**Furman**	Paladin Stadium • Greenville, SC		**EU** 41–34	9,457	
November 12	3:00 p.m.	**Samford**	**The Citadel**	Johnson Hagood Stadium • Charleston, SC		**SU** 19–14	13,591	
November 12	3:30 p.m.	**Western Carolina**	**Appalachian State**	Kidd Brewer Stadium • Boone, NC		**ASU** 46–14	30,622	

Players of the week:

Offensive		Defensive		Freshman		Special teams	
Thomas Wilson	Elon	Joshua Jones	Elon	Dominique Swope	Georgia Southern	Drew Stewart	Appalachian State

=== Week Twelve ===
Date	Time	Visiting team	Home team	Site	Broadcast	Result	Attendance	Reference
November 19, 2011	12:00 p.m.	**The Citadel**	#12 South Carolina	Williams-Brice Stadium • Columbia, SC	SportsSouth	**L** 20–41	76,816	
November 19, 2011	12:00 p.m.	**Samford**	#24 Auburn	Jordan–Hare Stadium • Auburn, AL	PPV	**L** 16–35	84,842	
November 19, 2011	1:00 p.m.	**Furman**	Florida	Ben Hill Griffin Stadium • Gainesville, FL	PPV	**L** 32–54	84,674	
November 19, 2011	2:00 p.m.	**Wofford**	**Chattanooga**	Finley Stadium • Chattanooga, TN		**WC** 28–27	8,165	
November 19, 2011	2:00 p.m.	#3 **Georgia Southern**	#3 Alabama	Bryant–Denny Stadium • Tuscaloosa, AL	PPV	**GSU** 21–45	101,821	
November 19, 2011	2:00 p.m.	Coastal Carolina	**Western Carolina**	E.J. Whitmire Stadium • Cullowhee, NC		**L** 21–45	5,201	
November 19, 2011	3:30 p.m.	**Appalachian State**	**Elon**	Rhodes Stadium • Elon, NC	ESPN3	**ASU** 28–24	10,683	

Players of the week:

Offensive		Defensive		Freshman		Special teams	
Thomas Wilson	Elon	Joshua Jones	Elon	Dominique Swope	Georgia Southern	Drew Stewart	Appalachian State

=== Playoffs Second Round ===
Date	Time	Visiting team	Home team	Site	Broadcast	Result	Attendance	Reference
December 3	1:00 p.m.	Old Dominion	**Georgia Southern**	Paulson Stadium • Statesboro, GA	ESPN3	**W** 55–48	13,226	
December 3	2:00 p.m.	Maine	**Appalachian State**	Kidd Brewer Stadium • Boone, NC	ESPN3	**L** 12–34	15,291	
December 3	5:00 p.m.	**#12 Wofford**	#2 Northern Iowa	UNI-Dome • Cedar Falls, IA	ESPN3	**L** 21–28	6,915	

=== Playoffs Quarterfinals ===
Date	Time	Visiting team	Home team	Site	Broadcast	Result	Attendance	Reference
December 10	2:00 p.m.	#13 Maine	**#3 Georgia Southern**	Paulson Stadium • Statesboro, GA	ESPN3	**W** 35–23	12,886	

=== Playoffs Semifinals ===
Date	Time	Visiting team	Home team	Site	Broadcast	Result	Attendance	Reference
December 17	2:30 p.m.	**#3 Georgia Southern**	#4 North Dakota State	Fargodome • Fargo, ND	ESPNU	**L** 7–35	18,108	

== Attendance ==
Team	Stadium	Capacity	Game 1	Game 2	Game 3	Game 4	Game 5	Game 6	Game 7	Game 8	Total	Average	% of Capacity
Appalachian State	Kidd Brewer Stadium	21,650	26,415	24,917	27,304	28,912	30,018	30,622	—	—	168,188	28,031	129.47%
Chattanooga	Finley Stadium	20,668	12,185	10,727	11,866	9,239	8,165	—	—	—	52,185	10,136	50.50%
The Citadel	Johnson Hagood Stadium	21,000	12,099	13,414	12,316	14,154	11,184	13,591	—	—	76,758	12,793	60.92%
Elon	Rhodes Stadium	13,000	8,712	10,883	7,195	9,294	10,638	—	—	—	46,722	9,344	71.88%
Furman	Paladin Stadium	16,000	12,139	9,152	11,716	12,856	9,457	—	—	—	55,320	11,064	69.15%
Georgia Southern	Paulson Stadium	18,000	21,812	19,067	20,593	19,221	16,392	18,408	—	—	115,493	19,249	106.94%
Samford	Seibert Stadium	6,700	8,714	5,942	7,726	5,703	6,317	6,522	—	—	40,924	6,821	101.80%
Western Carolina	E.J. Whitmire Stadium	13,742	7,789	9,989	5,239	7,277	4,770	5,201	—	—	40,265	6,711	48.83%
Wofford	Gibbs Stadium	13,000	7,329	10,329	6,290	8,611	10,280	—	—	—	42,839	8,568	65.91%

== Post-season awards and honors ==
Position	Player	Class	Team
First Team Offense
QB	Chris Forcier	Sr.	Furman
RB	Jerodis Williams	Jr.	Furman
RB	Eric Breitenstein	Jr.	Wofford
WR	Brian Quick	Sr.	Appalachian State
WR	Aaron Mellette	Jr.	Elon
TE	Colin Anderson	Jr.	Furman
OL	Orry Frye	Sr.	Appalachian State
OL	Ryan Lee	Sr.	Furman
OL	Brett Moore	Sr.	Georgia Southern
OL	William Maxwell	Sr.	Georgia Southern
OL	Nate Page	Sr.	Wofford
First Team Defense
DL	Derek Douglas	So.	The Citadel
DL	Brent Russell	Jr.	Georgia Southern
DL	Josh Williams	Jr.	Chattanooga
DL	Alex Goltry	Sr.	Wofford
LB	Joshua Jones	Sr.	Elon
LB	Kadarron Anderson	Sr.	Furman
LB	Alvin Scioneaux	So.	Wofford
DB	Demetrius McCray	Jr.	Appalachian State
DB	Ryan Steed	Sr.	Furman
DB	Laron Scott	Sr.	Georgia Southern
DB	Corey White	Sr.	Samford
First Team Special Teams
K	Adrian Mora	Sr.	Georgia Southern
P	Cass Couey	Jr.	The Citadel
RS	Laron Scott	Sr.	Georgia Southern

== NFL draft ==
The following list includes all SoCon players who were drafted in the 2012 NFL draft.

Round #	Pick #	NFL team	Player	Position	College
2	33	St. Louis Rams	Brian Quick	WR	Appalachian State
5	162	New Orleans Saints	Corey White	S	Samford
7	243	Green Bay Packers	B. J. Coleman	QB	Chattanooga
