= Moncure (disambiguation) =

Moncure, North Carolina is a small rural unincorporated community in southeastern Chatham County, North Carolina, United States.

Moncure may also refer to:

== Surname ==
- Frank P. Moncure (1889–1969), Virginia lawyer and politician
- Jane Belk Moncure (1926–2013), American author of early childhood non-fiction, fiction and poetry
- Marion Elizabeth Moncure (1913–1978), 25th President General of the Daughters of the American Revolution
- Richard C. L. Moncure (1805–1882), Virginia politician and jurist
- Richard C. L. Moncure (politician) (1872–1937), American Democratic politician, member of the Virginia Senate

== Given name ==
- Moncure D. Conway (1832–1907), American abolitionist and minister
- Anne Moncure Crane (1838–1872), American writer and novelist
- John Moncure Daniel (1825–1865), United States minister to the Kingdom of Sardinia in 1854–1861
- Joseph Moncure March (1899–1977), American poet and essayist
- Moncure Robinson (1802–1891), American civil engineer, railroad planner and builder and a railroad and steamboat owner

== See also ==
- Moncur
