= 2011 Appalachian State Mountaineers football team =

American college football season

2011 Appalachian State Mountaineers football

NCAA Division I Second Round vs. Maine, L 12–34
- Conference: Southern Conference

Ranking
- Sports Network: No. 9
- FCS Coaches: No. 8
- Record: 8–4 (6–2 SoCon)
- Head coach: Jerry Moore (23rd season)
- Offensive scheme: Multiple spread
- Defensive coordinator: Dale Jones (2nd season)
- Base defense: 3–4
- Home stadium: Kidd Brewer Stadium

2011 Southern Conference football standings
	Conf.			Overall
Team	W		L	W		L
No. 3 Georgia Southern $^	7	–	1	11	–	3
No. 12 Wofford ^	6	–	2	8	–	4
No. 9 Appalachian State ^	6	–	2	8	–	4
Furman	5	–	3	6	–	5
Samford	4	–	4	6	–	5
Chattanooga	3	–	5	5	–	6
Elon	3	–	5	5	–	6
The Citadel	2	–	6	4	–	7
Western Carolina	0	–	8	1	–	10
$ – Conference champion; ^ – FCS playoff participant; Rankings from The Sports Network poll

The 2011 Appalachian State Mountaineers football team represented Appalachian State University in the 2011 NCAA Division I FCS football season. The Mountaineers were led by 23rd year head coach Jerry Moore and played their home games at Kidd Brewer Stadium as a member of the Southern Conference. They finished the season 8–4, 6–2 in SoCon play to finish in a tie for second place. They received an at-large bid into the FCS playoffs where they lost in the second round to Maine.

== Schedule ==
Date	Time	Opponent	Rank	Site	TV	Result	Attendance
September 3	12:30 p.m.	at No. 13 (FBS) Virginia Tech*	No. 2	Lane Stadium; Blacksburg, VA	ACC Network	L 13–66	66,233
September 10	3:30 p.m.	North Carolina A&T*	No. 3	Kidd Brewer Stadium; Boone, NC		W 58–6	26,415
September 17	6:00 p.m.	Savannah State*	No. 3	Kidd Brewer Stadium; Boone, NC		W 41–6	24,917
September 24	3:30 p.m.	No. 13 Chattanooga	No. 3	Kidd Brewer Stadium; Boone, NC		W 14–12	27,304
October 1	3:00 p.m.	at No. 8 Wofford	No. 3	Gibbs Stadium; Spartanburg, SC	ESPN3	L 14–28	10,329
October 15	2:00 p.m.	at The Citadel	No. 7	Johnson Hagood Stadium; Charleston, SC		W 49–42	14,154
October 22	3:30 p.m.	Samford^{†}	No. 6	Kidd Brewer Stadium; Boone, NC		W 35–17	28,912
October 29	3:00 p.m.	No. 1 Georgia Southern	No. 5	Kidd Brewer Stadium; Boone, NC (rivalry)	ESPN3	W 24–17	30,018
November 5	1:30 p.m.	at Furman	No. 3	Paladin Stadium; Greenville, SC		L 10–20	12,856
November 12	3:30 p.m.	Western Carolina	No. 10	Kidd Brewer Stadium; Boone, NC (Battle for the Old Mountain Jug)		W 46–14	30,622
November 19	3:00 p.m.	at Elon	No. 9	Rhodes Stadium; Elon, NC	ESPN3	W 28–24	10,683
December 3	2:00 p.m.	No. 13 Maine*	No. 9	Kidd Brewer Stadium; Boone, NC (NCAA Division I Second Round)	ESPN3	L 12–34	15,291
*Non-conference game; ^{†}Homecoming; Rankings from The Sports Network Poll released prior to the game; All times are in Eastern time
