= 2011 Wofford Terriers football team =

American college football season

2011 Wofford Terriers football

FCS Playoffs Second Round, L 21–28 vs. Northern Iowa
- Conference: Southern Conference

Ranking
- Sports Network: No. 12
- FCS Coaches: No. 11
- Record: 8–4 (6–2 SoCon)
- Head coach: Mike Ayers (24th season)
- Offensive coordinator: Wade Lang
- Defensive coordinator: Nate Woody
- Home stadium: Gibbs Stadium

2011 Southern Conference football standings
	Conf.			Overall
Team	W		L	W		L
No. 3 Georgia Southern $^	7	–	1	11	–	3
No. 12 Wofford ^	6	–	2	8	–	4
No. 9 Appalachian State ^	6	–	2	8	–	4
Furman	5	–	3	6	–	5
Samford	4	–	4	6	–	5
Chattanooga	3	–	5	5	–	6
Elon	3	–	5	5	–	6
The Citadel	2	–	6	4	–	7
Western Carolina	0	–	8	1	–	10
$ – Conference champion; ^ – FCS playoff participant; Rankings from The Sports Network Poll

The 2011 Wofford Terriers team represented Wofford College in the 2011 NCAA Division I FCS football season. The Terriers were led by 24th-year head coach Mike Ayers and played their home games at Gibbs Stadium. They are a member of the Southern Conference. They finished the season 8–4, 6–2 in SoCon play to finish in a tie for second place. They received an at-large bid into the FCS playoffs where they lost in the second round to Northern Iowa.

== Schedule ==
Date	Time	Opponent	Rank	Site	TV	Result	Attendance
September 3	1:30 pm	at Presbyterian*	No. 8	Bailey Memorial Stadium; Clinton, SC		W 35–28	5,108
September 10	3:30 pm	at Clemson*	No. 7	Memorial Stadium; Clemson, SC		L 27–35	74,538
September 24	7:00 pm	Samford	No. 9	Gibbs Stadium; Spartanburg, SC		W 38–23	7,329
October 1	3:00 pm	No. 3 Appalachian State	No. 8	Gibbs Stadium; Spartanburg, SC	ESPN3	W 28–14	10,329
October 8	1:00 pm	at The Citadel	No. 5	Johnson Hagood Stadium; Charleston, SC		W 43–14	12,316
October 15	1:30 pm	Virginia–Wise*	No. 5	Gibbs Stadium; Spartanburg, SC		W 47–14	6,290
October 22	2:00 pm	at Furman	No. 5	Paladin Stadium; Greenville, SC		L 21–26	11,716
October 29	1:30 pm	Elon	No. 12	Gibbs Stadium; Spartanburg, SC		W 48–28	8,611
November 5	3:00 pm	at Western Carolina	No. 11	E.J. Whitmire Stadium; Cullowhee, NC	ESPN3	W 42–24	4,770
November 12	1:30 pm	No. 4 Georgia Southern	No. 9	Gibbs Stadium; Spartanburg, SC		L 10–31	10,280
November 19	2:00 pm	at Chattanooga	No. 13	Finley Stadium; Chattanooga, TN		W 28–27	8,165
December 3	5:00 pm	at No. 2 Northern Iowa*	No. 12	UNI-Dome; Cedar Falls, IA (FCS Playoffs – Second Round)	ESPN3	L 21–28	6,915
*Non-conference game; Rankings from The Sports Network Poll released prior to the game; All times are in Eastern time
