= 2011 Georgia Southern Eagles football team =

American college football season

2011 Georgia Southern Eagles football

SoCon champion

FCS Playoffs Semifinals, L 7–35 at North Dakota State
- Conference: Southern Conference

Ranking
- Sports Network: No. 3
- FCS Coaches: No. 2
- Record: 11–3 (7–1 SoCon)
- Head coach: Jeff Monken (2nd season)
- Offensive coordinator: Brent Davis (2nd season)
- Offensive scheme: Triple option
- Defensive coordinator: Jack Curtis (1st season)
- Base defense: 4–3
- Home stadium: Paulson Stadium

2011 Southern Conference football standings
	Conf.			Overall
Team	W		L	W		L
No. 3 Georgia Southern $^	7	–	1	11	–	3
No. 12 Wofford ^	6	–	2	8	–	4
No. 9 Appalachian State ^	6	–	2	8	–	4
Furman	5	–	3	6	–	5
Samford	4	–	4	6	–	5
Chattanooga	3	–	5	5	–	6
Elon	3	–	5	5	–	6
The Citadel	2	–	6	4	–	7
Western Carolina	0	–	8	1	–	10
$ – Conference champion; ^ – FCS playoff participant; Rankings from The Sports Network Poll

The 2011 Georgia Southern Eagles team represented Georgia Southern University in the 2011 NCAA Division I FCS football season. The Eagles were led by second-year head coach Jeff Monken and played their home games at Paulson Stadium. They are a member of the Southern Conference. They finished the season 11–3, 7–1 in Southern Conference play, winning the conference championship outright. They received the conference's automatic bid into the FCS playoffs where they defeated Old Dominion in the second round and Maine in the quarterfinals before falling to North Dakota State in the semifinals.

== Schedule ==
Date	Time	Opponent	Rank	Site	TV	Result	Attendance	Source
September 3	7:00 pm	at Samford	No. 4	Seibert Stadium; Homewood, AL		W 31–17	8,714	
September 10	6:00 pm	Tusculum*	No. 2	Paulson Stadium; Statesboro, GA		W 62–21	21,812	
September 24	6:00 pm	Western Carolina	No. 1	Paulson Stadium; Statesboro, GA		W 52–20	19,067	
October 1	1:30 pm	at Elon	No. 1	Rhodes Stadium; Elon, NC		W 41–14	7,195	
October 8	6:00 pm	No. 24 Chattanooga	No. 1	Paulson Stadium; Statesboro, GA	ESPN3	W 28–27	20,593	
October 15	6:00 pm	Furman	No. 1	Paulson Stadium; Statesboro, GA	ESPN3	W 50–20	19,221	
October 22	2:00 pm	Presbyterian*	No. 1	Paulson Stadium; Statesboro, GA		W 48–14	16,392	
October 29	3:00 pm	at No. 5 Appalachian State	No. 1	Kidd Brewer Stadium; Boone, NC (rivalry)	ESPN3	L 17–24	30,018	
November 5	2:00 pm	The Citadel^{†}	No. 5	Paulson Stadium; Statesboro, GA		W 14–12	18,408	
November 12	1:00 pm	at No. 9 Wofford	No. 4	Gibbs Stadium; Spartanburg, SC		W 31–10	10,280	
November 19	12:00 pm	at No. 3 (FBS) Alabama*	No. 3	Bryant–Denny Stadium; Tuscaloosa, AL	ESPN3	L 21–45	101,821	
December 3	1:00 pm	No. 10 Old Dominion*	No. 3	Paulson Stadium; Statesboro, GA (NCAA Division I Second Round)	ESPN3	W 55–48	13,226	
December 10	2:00 pm	No. 13 Maine*	No. 3	Paulson Stadium; Statesboro, GA (NCAA Division I Quarterfinal)	ESPN3	W 35–23	12,886	
December 17	2:00 pm	at No. 4 North Dakota State*	No. 3	Fargodome; Fargo, ND (NCAA Division I Semifinal)	ESPNU	L 7–35	18,108	
*Non-conference game; ^{†}Homecoming; Rankings from The Sports Network Poll released prior to the game; All times are in Eastern time

== Rankings ==
On November 13, Georgia Southern received one vote in the AP poll.
