= 2011 Elon Phoenix football team =

American college football season

2011 Elon Phoenix football
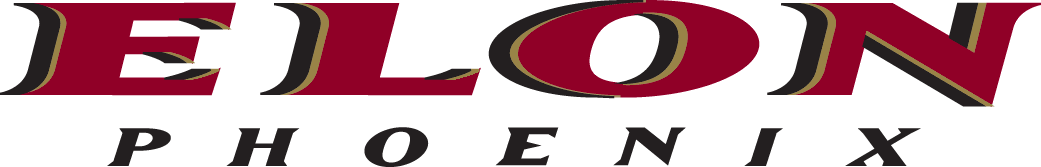
- Conference: Southern Conference
- Record: 5–6 (3–5 SoCon)
- Head coach: Jason Swepson (1st season)
- Offensive coordinator: Chris Pincince (1st season)
- Defensive coordinator: Ed Pinkham (1st season)
- Home stadium: Rhodes Stadium

2011 Southern Conference football standings
	Conf.			Overall
Team	W		L	W		L
No. 3 Georgia Southern $^	7	–	1	11	–	3
No. 12 Wofford ^	6	–	2	8	–	4
No. 9 Appalachian State ^	6	–	2	8	–	4
Furman	5	–	3	6	–	5
Samford	4	–	4	6	–	5
Chattanooga	3	–	5	5	–	6
Elon	3	–	5	5	–	6
The Citadel	2	–	6	4	–	7
Western Carolina	0	–	8	1	–	10
$ – Conference champion; ^ – FCS playoff participant; Rankings from The Sports Network Poll

The 2011 Elon Phoenix football team represented Elon University in the 2011 NCAA Division I FCS football season. The Phoenix were led by first-year head coach Jason Swepson and played their home games at Rhodes Stadium. They are a member of the Southern Conference. They finished the season 5–6, 3–5 in SoCon play to finish in a tie for sixth place.

== Schedule ==
Date	Time	Opponent	Site	TV	Result	Attendance
September 3	6:30 pm	at Vanderbilt*	Vanderbilt Stadium; Nashville, TN		L 14–45	27,599
September 10	7:00 pm	Concord*	Rhodes Stadium; Elon, NC		W 42–10	8,712
September 17	6:00 pm	at North Carolina Central*	O'Kelly–Riddick Stadium; Durham, NC		W 23–22	6,722
September 24	1:30 pm	The Citadel	Rhodes Stadium; Elon, NC		W 18–15 ^{OT}	10,883
October 1	1:30 pm	No. 1 Georgia Southern	Rhodes Stadium; Elon, NC		L 14–41	7,195
October 8	3:00 pm	at Western Carolina	E.J. Whitmire Stadium; Cullowhee, NC		W 38–31	5,239
October 15	3:00 pm	at Samford	Seibert Stadium; Homewood, AL		L 31–43	5,703
October 22	3:00 pm	Chattanooga^{†}	Rhodes Stadium; Elon, NC	ESPN3	L 18–42	9,294
October 29	1:30 pm	at No. 12 Wofford	Gibbs Stadium; Spartanburg, SC		L 28–48	8,611
November 12	1:30 pm	at No. 17 Furman	Paladin Stadium; Greenville, SC		W 41–34	9,457
November 19	3:00 pm	No. 9 Appalachian State	Rhodes Stadium; Elon, NC	ESPN3	L 24–28	10,638
*Non-conference game; ^{†}Homecoming; Rankings from The Sports Network Poll released prior to the game; All times are in Eastern time
