= 2011 Chattanooga Mocs football team =

American college football season

2011 Chattanooga Mocs football
- Conference: Southern Conference
- Record: 5–6 (3–5 SoCon)
- Head coach: Russ Huesman (3rd season)
- Offensive coordinator: Marcus Satterfield (3rd season)
- Defensive coordinator: Adam Fuller (3rd season)
- Home stadium: Finley Stadium

2011 Southern Conference football standings
	Conf.			Overall
Team	W		L	W		L
No. 3 Georgia Southern $^	7	–	1	11	–	3
No. 12 Wofford ^	6	–	2	8	–	4
No. 9 Appalachian State ^	6	–	2	8	–	4
Furman	5	–	3	6	–	5
Samford	4	–	4	6	–	5
Chattanooga	3	–	5	5	–	6
Elon	3	–	5	5	–	6
The Citadel	2	–	6	4	–	7
Western Carolina	0	–	8	1	–	10
$ – Conference champion; ^ – FCS playoff participant; Rankings from The Sports Network Poll

The 2011 Chattanooga Mocs football team represented the University of Tennessee at Chattanooga as a member of the Southern Conference (SoCon) in the 2011 NCAA Division I FCS football season. The Mocs were led by third-year head coach Russ Huesman and played their home games at Finley Stadium. They finished the season 5–6 overall and 3–5 in SoCon play to tie for sixth place.

== Schedule ==
Date	Time	Opponent	Rank	Site	TV	Result	Attendance
September 3	3:30 pm	at No. 11 (FBS) Nebraska*	No. 21	Memorial Stadium; Lincoln, NE		L 7–40	85,883
September 10	6:00 pm	No. 10 Jacksonville State*	No. 23	Finley Stadium; Chattanooga, TN		W 38–17	12,185
September 17	6:00 pm	at Eastern Kentucky*	No. 14	Roy Kidd Stadium; Richmond, KY		W 23–14	10,100
September 24	3:30 pm	at No. 3 Appalachian State	No. 13	Kidd Brewer Stadium; Boone, NC		L 12–14	27,304
October 1	6:00 pm	The Citadel	No. 15	Finley Stadium; Chattanooga, TN		L 27–28	10,727
October 8	6:00 pm	at No. 1 Georgia Southern	No. 24	Paulson Stadium; Statesboro, GA	ESPN3	L 27–28	20,593
October 15	6:00 pm	Western Carolina^{†}		Finley Stadium; Chattanooga, TN		W 51–7	11,866
October 22	3:00 pm	at Elon		Rhodes Stadium; Elon, NC	ESPN3	W 42–18	9,294
October 29	2:00 pm	Furman		Finley Stadium; Chattanooga, TN		L 7–14	9,239
November 5	3:00 pm	at Samford		Seibert Stadium; Homewood, AL		W 24–9	6,522
November 19	2:00 pm	No. 13 Wofford		Finley Stadium; Chattanooga, TN		L 27–28	8,165
*Non-conference game; ^{†}Homecoming; Rankings from The Sports Network Poll released prior to the game; All times are in Eastern time
