= Swepson =

Swepson is a surname. Notable people with the surname include:

- George William Swepson (1819–1883), American businessman and swindler
- Jason Swepson, American football coach and former player
- Mitchell Swepson (born 1993), Australian cricketer
