= 2011 The Citadel Bulldogs football team =

American college football season

2011 The Citadel Bulldogs football
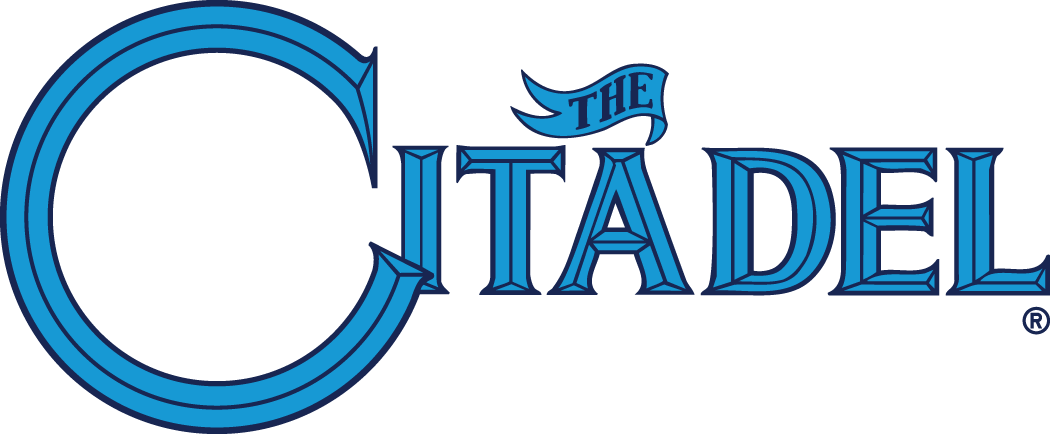
- Conference: Southern Conference
- Record: 4–7 (2–6 SoCon)
- Head coach: Kevin Higgins (7th season)
- Offensive coordinator: Bob Bodine (1st season)
- Offensive scheme: Triple option
- Defensive coordinator: Josh Conklin (2nd season)
- Base defense: 4–2–5
- Home stadium: Johnson Hagood Stadium

2011 Southern Conference football standings
	Conf.			Overall
Team	W		L	W		L
No. 3 Georgia Southern $^	7	–	1	11	–	3
No. 12 Wofford ^	6	–	2	8	–	4
No. 9 Appalachian State ^	6	–	2	8	–	4
Furman	5	–	3	6	–	5
Samford	4	–	4	6	–	5
Chattanooga	3	–	5	5	–	6
Elon	3	–	5	5	–	6
The Citadel	2	–	6	4	–	7
Western Carolina	0	–	8	1	–	10
$ – Conference champion; ^ – FCS playoff participant; Rankings from The Sports Network Poll

The 2011 The Citadel Bulldogs football team represented The Citadel, The Military College of South Carolina in the 2011 NCAA Division I FCS football season. The Bulldogs were led by seventh year head coach Kevin Higgins and played their home games at Johnson Hagood Stadium. They are a member of the Southern Conference. They finished the season 4–7, 2–6 in SoCon play to finish in eighth place.

== Preseason ==
The Bulldogs returned a total of 22 starters from last year's team, losing only 6 players. On offense, ten starters returned, while eight return on defense and four on special teams. SoCon coaches picked The Citadel to finish eight in the conference, ahead of only Western Carolina. Media covering the conference picked The Citadel to finish last. Only one Bulldog was picked to the preseason All-Conference team, with senior LB Tolu Akindele on the second team.

== Schedule ==
Date	Time	Opponent	Site	TV	Result	Attendance
September 3	6:00 pm	Jacksonville*	Johnson Hagood Stadium; Charleston, SC	BI	W 31–9	12,099
September 10	6:00 pm	Furman	Johnson Hagood Stadium; Charleston, SC (Rivalry)	ESPN3	L 6–16	13,414
September 24	1:30 pm	at Elon	Rhodes Stadium; Elon, NC		L 15–18 ^{OT}	10,883
October 1	6:00 pm	at No. 15 Chattanooga	Finley Stadium; Chattanooga, TN		W 28–27	10,727
October 8	1:00 pm	No. 5 Wofford	Johnson Hagood Stadium; Charleston, SC (rivalry)	BI	L 14–43	12,316
October 15	2:00 pm	No. 7 Appalachian State	Johnson Hagood Stadium; Charleston, SC	BI	L 42–49	14,154
October 22	3:00 pm	at Western Carolina	E. J. Whitmire Stadium; Cullowhee, NC		W 35–7	7,277
October 29	1:00 pm	VMI*	Johnson Hagood Stadium; Charleston, SC (Military Classic of the South)	BI	W 41–14	11,184
November 5	2:00 pm	at No. 5 Georgia Southern	Paulson Stadium; Statesboro, GA	BI	L 12–14	18,408
November 12	2:00 pm	Samford^{†}	Johnson Hagood Stadium; Charleston, SC	ESPN3	L 14–19	13,591
November 19	12:00 pm	at No. 14 (FBS) South Carolina*	Williams–Brice Stadium; Columbia, SC	ESPN3	L 20–41	76,816
*Non-conference game; ^{†}Homecoming; Rankings from The Sports Network Poll released prior to the game; All times are in Eastern time

== Awards ==
After placing only one player on the preseason team, the Bulldogs placed four players on the postseason All Conference teams, along with two on the All Freshman team.

=== Season ===
Derek Douglas, DL - 1st Team All Conference (Coaches and Media)
Cass Couey, P - 1st Team All Conference (Coaches and Media)
Mike Sellers, OL - 1st Team All Conference (Coaches), 2nd Team All Conference (Media)
Chris Billingslea - 2nd Team All Conference (Coaches and Media)
Aaron Miller - All Freshman (Coaches) Rah Muhammad - All Freshman (Coaches)

=== Weekly ===
Rob Harland (LB) - SoCon Defensive Player of the Week, week 5

== Game summaries ==
=== Jacksonville ===
Quarter	1	2	3	4	Total
Jacksonville	9	0	0	0	9
The Citadel	0	14	10	7	31

at Johnson Hagood Stadium (Charleston, SC)

- Game time: 6:00 PM
- Game attendance: 12,099
- Referee: Ted Pitts

=== Furman ===
Quarter	1	2	3	4	Total
Furman	6	7	0	3	16
The Citadel	0	6	0	0	6

at Johnson Hagood Stadium (Charleston, SC)

- Game time: 6:00 PM
- Game attendance: 13,414

=== Elon ===
Quarter	1	2	3	4	OT	Total
The Citadel	0	7	0	8	0	15
Elon	0	6	6	3	3	18

at Rhodes Stadium (Elon, NC)

- Game time: 1:30 PM
- Game attendance: 10,883
- Referee: Steve Marlowe

=== Chattanooga ===
The Citadel trailed 27-0 in the third quarter before rallying to score four touchdowns, taking a 28–27 lead. DB Davis Boyle intercepted a pass from B.J. Coleman in the final minutes to seal the upset over #15 Chattanooga.

Quarter	1	2	3	4	Total
The Citadel	0	0	14	14	28
Chattanooga	7	17	3	0	27

at Finley Stadium (Chattanooga, TN)

- Game time: 6:00 PM
- Game attendance: 10,727
- Referee: Ted Pitts

=== Wofford ===
Quarter	1	2	3	4	Total
Wofford	14	14	8	7	43
The Citadel	0	0	0	14	14

at Johnson Hagood Stadium (Charleston, SC)

- Game time: 1:00 PM
- Game attendance: 12,316
- Referee: Ed Rhodes

=== Appalachian State ===
Quarter	1	2	3	4	Total
Appalachian State	14	21	14	0	49
The Citadel	7	7	14	14	42

at Johnson Hagood Stadrium (Charleston, SC)

- Game time: 2:00 PM
- Game attendance: 14,154
- Referee: Larry Saunders

=== Western Carolina ===
Quarter	1	2	3	4	Total
The Citadel	14	7	0	14	35
Western Carolina	0	0	0	7	7

at Bob Waters Field at E. J. Whitmire Stadium (Cullowhee, NC)

- Game time: 3:00 PM
- Game attendance: 7,277
- Referee: Thomas Graham

=== VMI ===
In the first Military Classic of the South since 2007, The Citadel defeated VMI 41–14. The Bulldogs blocked three Keydet punts, returning one for a touchdown. The Citadel rushed for 358 yards and four offensive touchdowns, with two each by QB Ben Dupree and RB Denard Robinson. VMI's passing game was largely held in check with only 68 yards in the air, although RB Chaz Jones carried 16 times for 112 yards and a touchdown. The Citadel now leads the series 35–30–2, winning each of the last five meetings. The Citadel also holds a 22–10 record when meeting VMI in Charleston.

The Citadel and VMI agreed to renew their series for six years beginning in 2011, alternating home fields. The series dates to 1920, and they have played every year since 1946, with the exception of 1956, 2004, and 2008–2010.

Quarter	1	2	3	4	Total
VMI	7	0	0	7	14
The Citadel	14	7	17	3	41

at Johnson Hagood Stadium (Charleston, SC)

- Game time: 1:00 PM
- Game attendance: 11,184
- Referee: Steve Marlowe

=== Georgia Southern ===
The Bulldogs had two extra points blocked and a missed field goal with 12 seconds remaining as Georgia Southern held on for a 14–12 win.

Quarter	1	2	3	4	Total
The Citadel	6	6	0	0	12
Georgia Southern	7	7	0	0	14

at Paulson Stadium (Statesboro, GA)

- Game time: 2:00 PM
- Game attendance: 18,408

=== Samford ===
Quarter	1	2	3	4	Total
Samford	0	10	3	6	19
The Citadel	14	0	0	0	14

at Johnson Hagood Stadium (Charleston, SC)

- Game time: 3:00 PM
- Game attendance: 13,591
- Referee: Ted Pitts
- TV: ESPN3

=== South Carolina ===
Quarter	1	2	3	4	Total
The Citadel	7	6	0	7	20
South Carolina	7	13	7	14	41

at Williams-Brice Stadium (Columbia, SC)

- Game time: 12:00 PM
- Game attendance: 76,816
- TV: ESPN3

== NFL Draft selection ==
Year	Round	Pick	Overall	Name	Team	Position
2011	4	31	128	Cortez Allen	Pittsburgh Steelers	CB
