= 2011 Western Carolina Catamounts football team =

American college football season

2011 Western Carolina Catamounts football
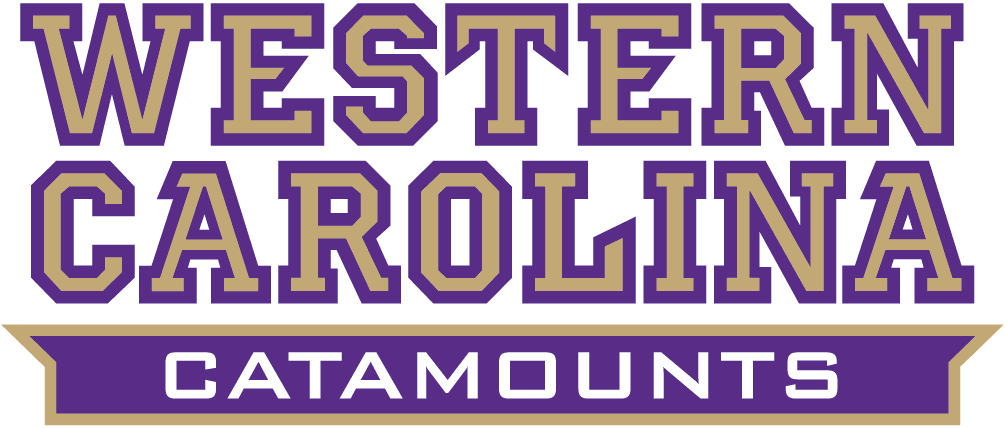
- Conference: Southern Conference
- Record: 1–10 (0–8 SoCon)
- Head coach: Dennis Wagner (4th season)
- Defensive coordinator: Matt Pawlowski (4th season)
- Home stadium: Bob Waters Field at E. J. Whitmire Stadium

2011 Southern Conference football standings
	Conf.			Overall
Team	W		L	W		L
No. 3 Georgia Southern $^	7	–	1	11	–	3
No. 12 Wofford ^	6	–	2	8	–	4
No. 9 Appalachian State ^	6	–	2	8	–	4
Furman	5	–	3	6	–	5
Samford	4	–	4	6	–	5
Chattanooga	3	–	5	5	–	6
Elon	3	–	5	5	–	6
The Citadel	2	–	6	4	–	7
Western Carolina	0	–	8	1	–	10
$ – Conference champion; ^ – FCS playoff participant; Rankings from The Sports Network poll

The 2011 Western Carolina Catamounts team represented Western Carolina University as a member of the Southern Conference (SoCon) during the 2011 NCAA Division I FCS football season. Led by Dennis Wagner in his fourth and final season as head coach, the Catamounts compiled an overall record of 1–10 with a mark of 0–8 in conference play, placing last out of nine teams in the SoCon. Western Carolina played home games at Bob Waters Field at E. J. Whitmire Stadium in Cullowhee, North Carolina.

== Schedule ==
Date	Time	Opponent	Site	TV	Result	Attendance
September 1	7:30 pm	at Georgia Tech*	Bobby Dodd Stadium; Atlanta, GA	ESPN3	L 21–63	42,132
September 10	6:00 pm	Mars Hill*	Bob Waters Field at E. J. Whitmire Stadium; Cullowhee, NC		W 52–31	7,789
September 24	6:00 pm	at No. 1 Georgia Southern	Paulson Stadium; Statesboro, GA		L 20–52	19,067
October 1	6:00 pm	Furman	Bob Waters Field at E. J. Whitmire Stadium; Cullowhee, NC		L 21–47	9,989
October 8	3:00 pm	Elon	Bob Waters Field at E. J. Whitmire Stadium; Cullowhee, NC		L 31–38	5,239
October 15	6:00 pm	at Chattanooga	Finley Stadium; Chattanooga, TN		L 7–51	11,866
October 22	3:00 pm	The Citadel^{†}	Bob Waters Field at E. J. Whitmire Stadium; Cullowhee, NC		L 7–35	7,277
October 29	3:00 pm	at Samford	Seibert Stadium; Homewood, AL		L 24–52	6,317
November 5	3:00 pm	No. 11 Wofford	Bob Waters Field at E. J. Whitmire Stadium; Cullowhee, NC	ESPN3	L 24–42	4,770
November 12	3:30 pm	at No. 10 Appalachian State	Kidd Brewer Stadium; Boone, NC (Battle for the Old Mountain Jug)		L 14–46	30,622
November 19	2:00 pm	Coastal Carolina*	Bob Waters Field at E. J. Whitmire Stadium; Cullowhee, NC		L 21–45	5,201
*Non-conference game; ^{†}Homecoming; Rankings from The Sports Network Poll released prior to the game; All times are in Eastern time
