= 2011 Samford Bulldogs football team =

American college football season

2011 Samford Bulldogs football
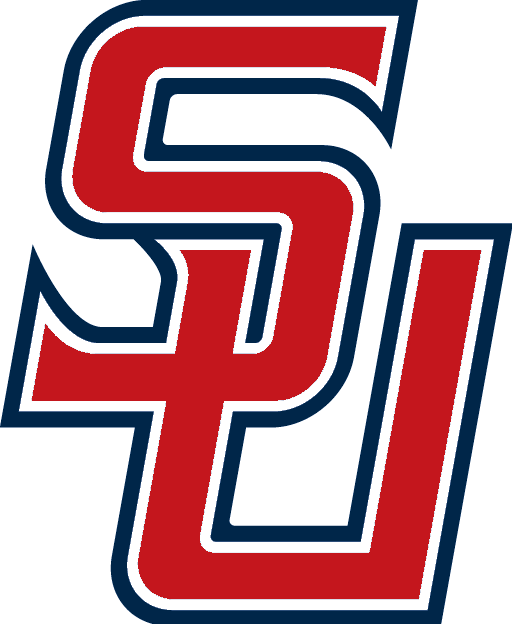
- Conference: Southern Conference
- Record: 6–5 (4–4 SoCon)
- Head coach: Pat Sullivan (5th season)
- Offensive coordinator: Rhett Lashlee (1st season)
- Defensive coordinator: Bill D'Ottavio
- Home stadium: Seibert Stadium

2011 Southern Conference football standings
	Conf.			Overall
Team	W		L	W		L
No. 3 Georgia Southern $^	7	–	1	11	–	3
No. 12 Wofford ^	6	–	2	8	–	4
No. 9 Appalachian State ^	6	–	2	8	–	4
Furman	5	–	3	6	–	5
Samford	4	–	4	6	–	5
Chattanooga	3	–	5	5	–	6
Elon	3	–	5	5	–	6
The Citadel	2	–	6	4	–	7
Western Carolina	0	–	8	1	–	10
$ – Conference champion; ^ – FCS playoff participant; Rankings from The Sports Network Poll

The 2011 Samford Bulldogs team represented Samford University in the 2011 NCAA Division I FCS football season. The Bulldogs were led by fifth-year head coach Pat Sullivan and played their home games at Seibert Stadium. They are a member of the Southern Conference. They finished the season 6–5, 4–4 in SoCon play to finish in fifth place.

== Schedule ==
Date	Time	Opponent	Site	TV	Result	Attendance
September 3	6:00 pm	No. 4 Georgia Southern	Seibert Stadium; Homewood, AL		L 17–31	8,714
September 10	6:00 pm	Stillman*	Seibert Stadium; Homewood, AL		W 48–6	5,942
September 24	6:00 pm	at No. 9 Wofford	Gibbs Stadium; Spartanburg, SC		L 23–38	7,329
October 1	2:00 pm	Gardner–Webb*	Seibert Stadium; Homewood, AL		W 41–14	7,726
October 8	12:30 pm	at Furman	Paladin Stadium; Greenville, SC		W 26–21	9,152
October 15	2:00 pm	Elon	Seibert Stadium; Homewood, AL		W 43–31	5,703
October 22	2:30 pm	at No. 6 Appalachian State	Kidd Brewer Stadium; Boone, NC		L 17–35	28,912
October 29	2:00 pm	Western Carolina	Seibert Stadium; Homewood, AL		W 52–24	6,317
November 5	2:00 pm	Chattanooga	Seibert Stadium; Homewood, AL		L 9–24	6,522
November 12	2:00 pm	at The Citadel	Johnson Hagood Stadium; Charleston, SC	ESPN3	W 19–14	13,591
November 19	1:00 pm	at Auburn*	Jordan–Hare Stadium; Auburn, AL	ESPN3	L 16–35	85,347
*Non-conference game; Rankings from The Sports Network Poll released prior to the game; All times are in Central time
