= 2011 Furman Paladins football team =

American college football season

2011 Furman Paladins football
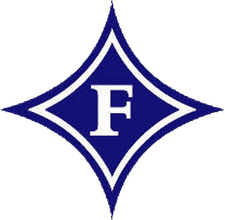
- Conference: Southern Conference
- Record: 6–5 (5–3 SoCon)
- Head coach: Bruce Fowler (1st season)
- Offensive coordinator: Jimmy Kiser (1st season)
- Defensive coordinator: John Windham (1st season)
- Captains: Daniel Spisak; Kadarron Anderson; Ryan Steed
- Home stadium: Paladin Stadium

2011 Southern Conference football standings
	Conf.			Overall
Team	W		L	W		L
No. 3 Georgia Southern $^	7	–	1	11	–	3
No. 12 Wofford ^	6	–	2	8	–	4
No. 9 Appalachian State ^	6	–	2	8	–	4
Furman	5	–	3	6	–	5
Samford	4	–	4	6	–	5
Chattanooga	3	–	5	5	–	6
Elon	3	–	5	5	–	6
The Citadel	2	–	6	4	–	7
Western Carolina	0	–	8	1	–	10
$ – Conference champion; ^ – FCS playoff participant; Rankings from The Sports Network Poll

The 2011 Furman Paladins team represented Furman University as a member of the Southern Conference (SoCon) during the 2011 NCAA Division I FCS football season. Led by first-year head coach Bruce Fowler, the Paladins compiled an overall record of 6–5 with a mark of 5–3 in conference play, placing fourth in the SoCon. Furman played home games at Paladin Stadium in Greenville, South Carolina.

== Schedule ==
Date	Time	Opponent	Rank	Site	TV	Result	Attendance
September 3	6:00 pm	at Coastal Carolina*		Brooks Stadium; Conway, SC		L 23–30	8,633
September 10	6:00 pm	at The Citadel		Johnson Hagood Stadium; Charleston, SC		W 16–6	13,414
September 24	1:00 pm	Presbyterian*		Paladin Stadium; Greenville, SC	CSS	W 62–21	12,139
October 1	6:00 pm	at Western Carolina		Bob Waters Field at E. J. Whitmire Stadium; Cullowhee, NC		W 47–21	9,989
October 8	1:30 pm	Samford		Paladin Stadium; Greenville, SC		L 21–26	9,152
October 15	3:00 pm	at No. 1 Georgia Southern		Paulson Stadium; Statesboro, GA	ESPN3	L 20–50	19,221
October 22	2:00 pm	No. 5 Wofford^{†}		Paladin Stadium; Greenville, SC (rivalry)		W 26–21	11,716
October 29	2:00 pm	at Chattanooga		Finley Stadium; Chattanooga, TN		W 14–7	9,239
November 5	1:30 pm	No. 3 Appalachian State		Paladin Stadium; Greenville, SC		W 20–10	12,856
November 12	1:30 pm	Elon	No. 17	Paladin Stadium; Greenville, SC		L 34–41	9,457
November 19	1:00 pm	at Florida*	No. 24	Ben Hill Griffin Stadium; Gainesville, FL		L 32–54	84,674
*Non-conference game; ^{†}Homecoming; Rankings from The Sports Network Poll released prior to the game; All times are in Eastern time
