= Jane Belk Moncure =

American writer (1926–2013)

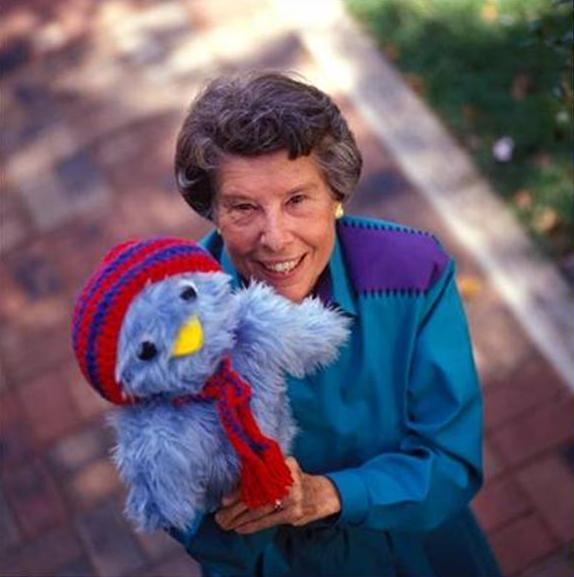
Jane Belk Moncure

Jane Belk Moncure (December 16, 1926 – July 30, 2013) was an American author of early childhood non-fiction, fiction and poetry. She also wrote under the names Bruce Wannamaker, Mary Thornton Blanton, and Jennie Davis.

== Career ==
Moncure lived in Virginia and North Carolina. For thirty-five years she worked in early childhood education, as well as wrote children's books. Her husband, James Moncure, was vice president of academics and student affairs at Elon University from 1974 to 1982, and their son James Moncure II served on the board of advisors to the business school. James Moncure helped establish the university's first learning resource center, and she donated a collection of all her published books to the School of Education, where they are in the Curriculum Resources Center. In her final years, Moncure lived in Fallston, North Carolina, and died surrounded by family in Mount Holly, North Carolina.

== Legacy ==
A creative and prolific author, millions of her books are extant, including in schools and libraries, having been distributed through The Child's World, ChildrensPress and Scholastic. Especially popular books include: My First Steps to Reading, My First Steps to Math, My First Steps to Science, Word Bird, The Sound Box Books, and Magic Castle Readers. Her works have been translated into British English, Spanish, French, Chinese, and Malay. Belk Library, Elon University holds a collection of all published books by Moncure.

Jane Belk Moncure received the C.S. Lewis Award, and other awards. In 2008, Jane received the Scholastic Teacher's Choice Award for her outstanding contribution to the My First Steps to Learning Program.
