= Biscuitville =

American regional fast food chain

Biscuitville Fresh Southern
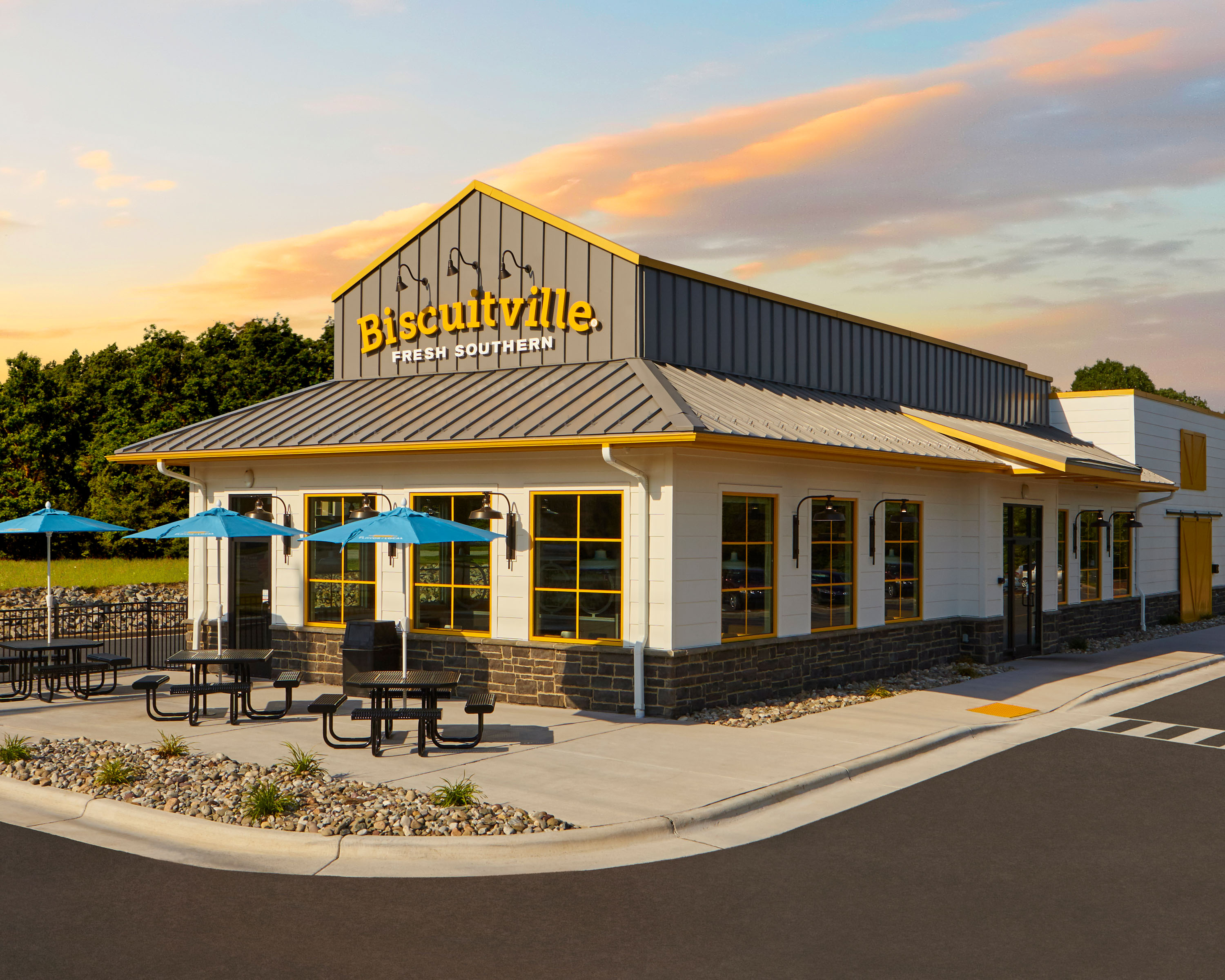
- Trade name: Biscuitville
- Formerly: Mountainbrook Fresh Bread & Milk (1966–1967); Pizzaville (1967–1975)
- Type: Private
- Industry: Food
- Founded: 1966; 60 years ago Burlington, North Carolina, U.S.
- Founders: Maurice Jennings
- Headquarters: 1414 Yanceyville St. Suite 300, Greensboro, North Carolina, U.S.,
- Number of locations: 82 (2023)
- Area served: North Carolina, South Carolina, Virginia
- Key people: Kathie Niven (CEO)
- Products: Breakfast, including biscuits, pancakes, potato wedges, grits, dessert
- Revenue: US$110 million
- Number of employees: 4,999 (2023)
- Website: biscuitville.com

Biscuitville Fresh Southern is a family-owned American regional fast-food restaurant chain. The restaurant specializes in the traditional southern breakfast made from scratch and with local ingredients. The chain primarily operates in the Southeastern United States and as of February 2024, there were 82 locations in the U.S. states of North Carolina, South Carolina and Virginia.

== History ==
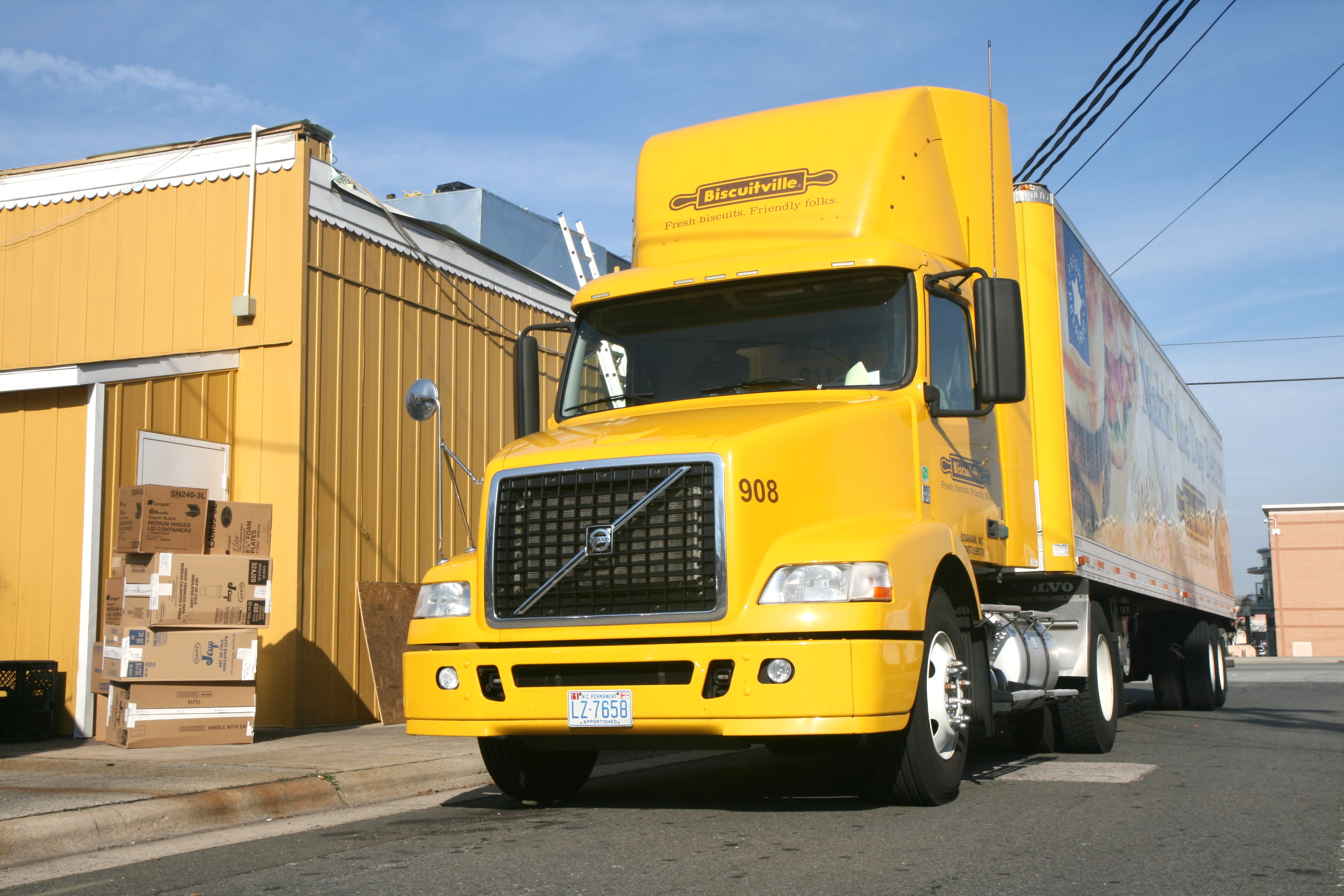
A truck unloading supplies at a Biscuitville in Durham, North Carolina

The company, originally named Mountainbrook Fresh Bread & Milk (eventually known as Pizzaville), started as two bread stores in Burlington, North Carolina The founder, Maurice Jennings, began making pizzas, and soon wanted a way to put the business to work in the morning. The company began making biscuits, from a recipe developed by the Jennings family, and eventually the company sold more biscuits than pizzas. The company opened its first biscuit-only operation named "Biscuitville", located in Danville, Virginia.

Since 1982, company policy is for locations to close at 2pm.

In 2007, the corporate headquarters was moved to Greensboro, North Carolina.

In July 2024, Biscuitville was named Best Fast Food Breakfast in the United States according to USA Today.

As of April 2024, Biscuitville has over 82 locations.
