= Belk Library (Elon University) =

Academic library at Elon University

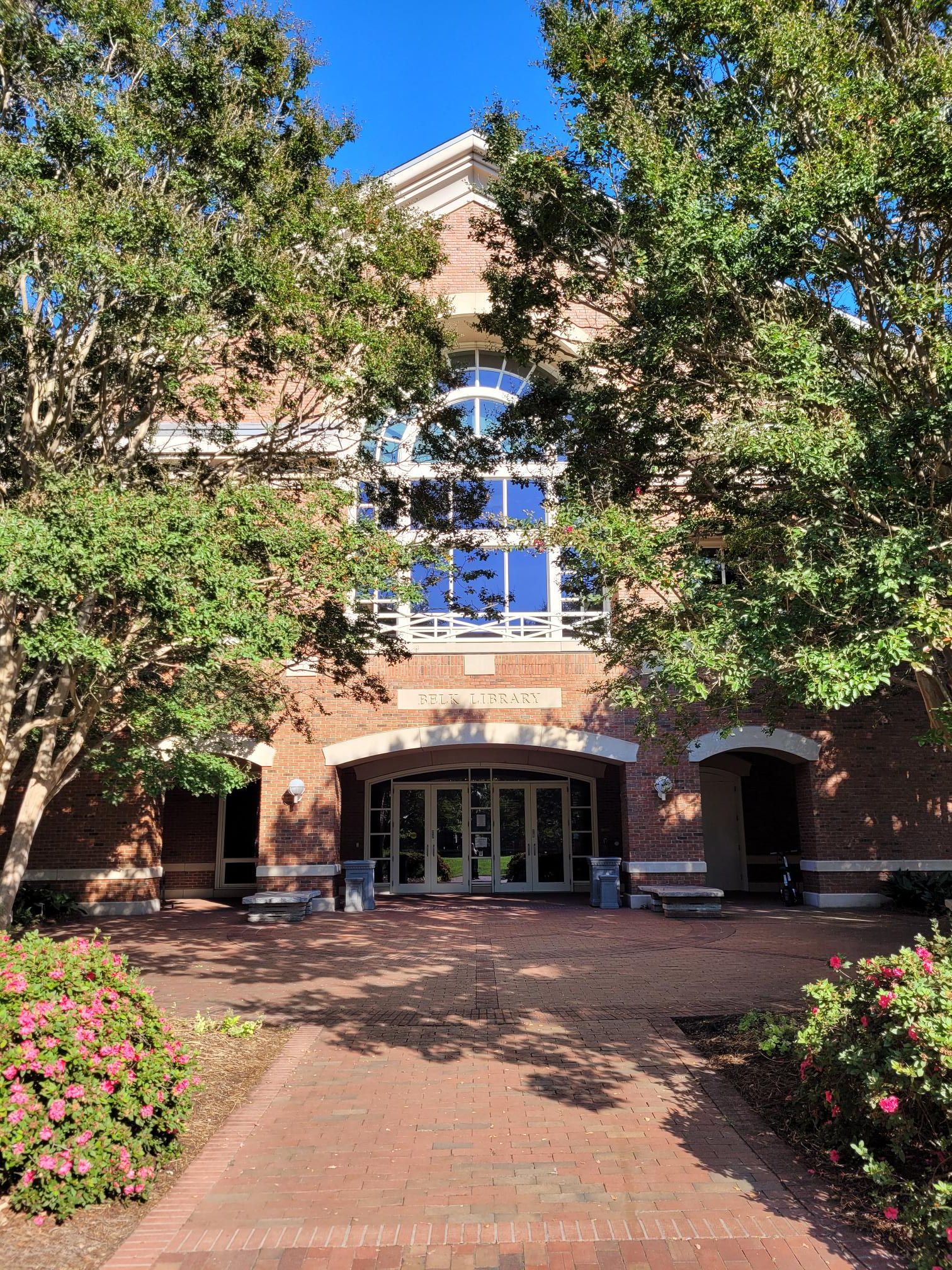
- 36°06′17″N 79°30′14″W
- Location: Elon, North Carolina, United States
- Established: 2000

Other information
- Website: Belk Library website

Carol Grotnes Belk Library is a library at Elon University, in Elon, North Carolina. It is the main academic library for the campus; Elon's Law Library is located in Greensboro, North Carolina along with Elon University School of Law.

== Information ==
Belk Library was opened on January 31, 2000, and was named after Carol Grotnes Belk. The library serves as a focal point for its community. It is the fourth location for the academic library of Elon University; previous locations included McEwen, Carlton, and Old Main. Belk Library at Elon shares a name with Belk Library at Appalachian State University.

Belk Library contains academic material as well as the university's special collections. The purpose of Belk Library's archives and special collections is to provide Elon students, faculty, and staff access to documentation of importance to their research, dating back to the early days of Elon College in 1889. The archives are the official repository of Elon University's records.

The Belk Library building is about 75,000 square feet (7,000 m^{2}) in size divided into three floors with classrooms, study rooms, offices, and stacks. The library collection comprises about 300,000 physical volumes. Its digital collection is much larger; over a million ebooks as well as subscriptions to databases and academic journals.

== Archival Collections ==
- Church history collections – newsletters, pamphlets, and other materials, many pertaining to the United Church of Christ, the Southern Conference of the Christian Church, and other denominations.
- Elon Authors – a compilation of works authored by Elon affiliates, including students, alumni, staff, and faculty.
- LGBTQIA Collection – materials related to the Gender & LGBTQIA Center at Elon
- McLendon Collection – mostly books describing the Civil War from a Confederate standpoint.
- Moncure Collection – the entire works of children's author, Jane Belk Moncure
- Williams-HoneyCutt Rare Books – first edition books from the eighteenth and nineteenth centuries. An 1854 copy of Walden by Henry David Thoreau and an 1879 copy of Mark Twain's Following the Equator are two of the extremely rare books in this collection.
- William Sloan Bible Collection – a group of about fifty rare Bibles collected from all around the world.
- Zine Collection
