= Maurice J. Koury =

American textile businessman

Maurice J. Koury (1929-2016) was an American textile businessman and philanthropist who founded Carolina Hosiery Mills inc. along with his brother, Ernest Koury. Carolina Hosiery is the largest manufacturer of socks in the US.

== Carolina Hosiery Mills ==
Ernest Koury started the company in the basement of their parents home in their hometown in Burlington, NC in 1945 after returning from serving the United States Air Force. Maurice joined after he finished his bachelor's degree in chemistry from the University of North Carolina at Chapel Hill, in 1948.

The Koury brothers had been operating the mill for over 60 years before his death and is now being led by their immediate family. Carolina Hosiery today manufactures well known brands such as Wrangler, Realtree, Top Flite, Ducks Unlimited, The Original Muck Boot Company, ROCKY, Georgia Boot, as well as private labels for department stores and sporting good chains. It also acquired another Burlington based mill, Jefferies Socks, a decade ago, which is now its division.

== Philanthropy ==
The Koury brothers have been active supporters throughout their lives of public education and athletics in the Carolina community. Maurice was an active member of his alma mater's Board of Trustees, Elon University's Board of Trustees and of the Medical Foundation of North Carolina. He led the successful fund-raising drive in the early 1980s as the president of the Educational Foundation to finance the construction of the Dean Smith Center, the Tar Heels basketball arena, and the adjacent natatorium, which is also named for Koury.

Their donations helped establish The Edna J. Koury Distinguished Professorship in the College of Arts and Sciences at UNC-Chapelhill in honor of their mother. In recognition of their generosity various buildings have been named after them:

- The Koury Natatorium at UNC-Chapelhill,
- The Koury Residence Hall at UNC Chapel Hill,
- Kenan-Flagler's Koury Auditorium,
- Koury Library in the George Watts Hill Alumni Center,
- The Ernest A. Koury Business Center at Elon University and
- The UNC Chapell Hill Koury Oral Health Sciences Building

== Honors ==
Maurice Koury and his wife were honored in 2011, with the Pro Ecclesia et Pontifice, which is the highest award of the Roman Catholic Church for their long life commitment of service to their community and catholic education.
