= Jason Swepson =

American football player and coach

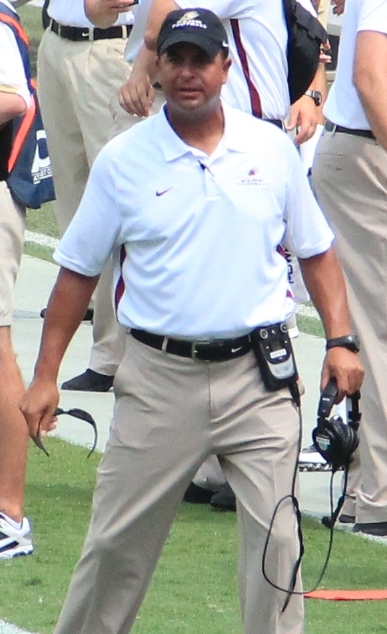
- Swepson in 2013

Current position
- Title: Head coach
- Team: Lawrence Academy (MA)

Playing career
- 1988–1992: Boston College
- Position: Running back

Coaching career (HC unless noted)
- 1992: Bates (assistant)
- 1993: Rhode Island (assistant)
- 1994–1995: Boston University (assistant)
- 1996: Holy Cross (assistant)
- 1997–1998: Northeastern (assistant)
- 1999–2006: Boston College (RB)
- 2007–2010: NC State (RB)
- 2011–2013: Elon
- 2015: New Haven (RB)
- 2016: MIT (OLB)
- 2018–present: Lawrence Academy (MA)

Head coaching record
- Overall: 10–24 (college)

Jason Swepson is an American football coach and former player. He is the head football coach at Lawrence Academy in Groton, Massachusetts, a position he had held since 2018. Swepson served as head football coach at Elon University from 2011 to 2013, compiling a record of 10–24. Previously, he was the running backs coach under Tom O'Brien at North Carolina State University and Boston College. Swepson played running back at Boston College from 1989 to 1992.

Swepson participated in the Bill Walsh NFL Minority Coaching Fellowship program with the New York Giants (2016), Cleveland Browns (2015), Seattle Seahawks (2014), Miami Dolphins (2000), San Diego Chargers (1999), and Jacksonville Jaguars (1998). He was fired as the head coach at Elon in November 2013.

== Head coaching record ==
=== College ===
Year	Team	Overall	Conference	Standing	Bowl/playoffs
Elon Phoenix (Southern Conference) (2011–2013)
2011	Elon	5–6	3–5	T–6th	
2012	Elon	3–8	1–7	8th	
2013	Elon	2–10	1–7	T–8th	
Elon:		10–24	5–19		
Total:		10–24			
