= Moncur =

Moncur is a surname. Notable people with the surname include:

- Alexander Moncur (1888–1976), New Zealand politician
- Avard Moncur (born 1978), Bahamian track and field athlete
- Bobby Moncur (born 1945), Scottish footballer
- Craig-James Moncur, Scottish actor and producer
- Eric Moncur (born 1984), American footballer
- George Moncur (born 1993), British footballer
- Grachan Moncur III (1937-2022), American jazz trombonist
- Hannah Moncur (born 2004), Scottish actress
- John Moncur (born 1966), British footballer
- TJ Moncur, (born 1987), British footballer
