= Gibbs Stadium =

Sports venue in Spartanburg, South Carolina, USA

Coordinates: 34°57′42″N 81°55′58″W

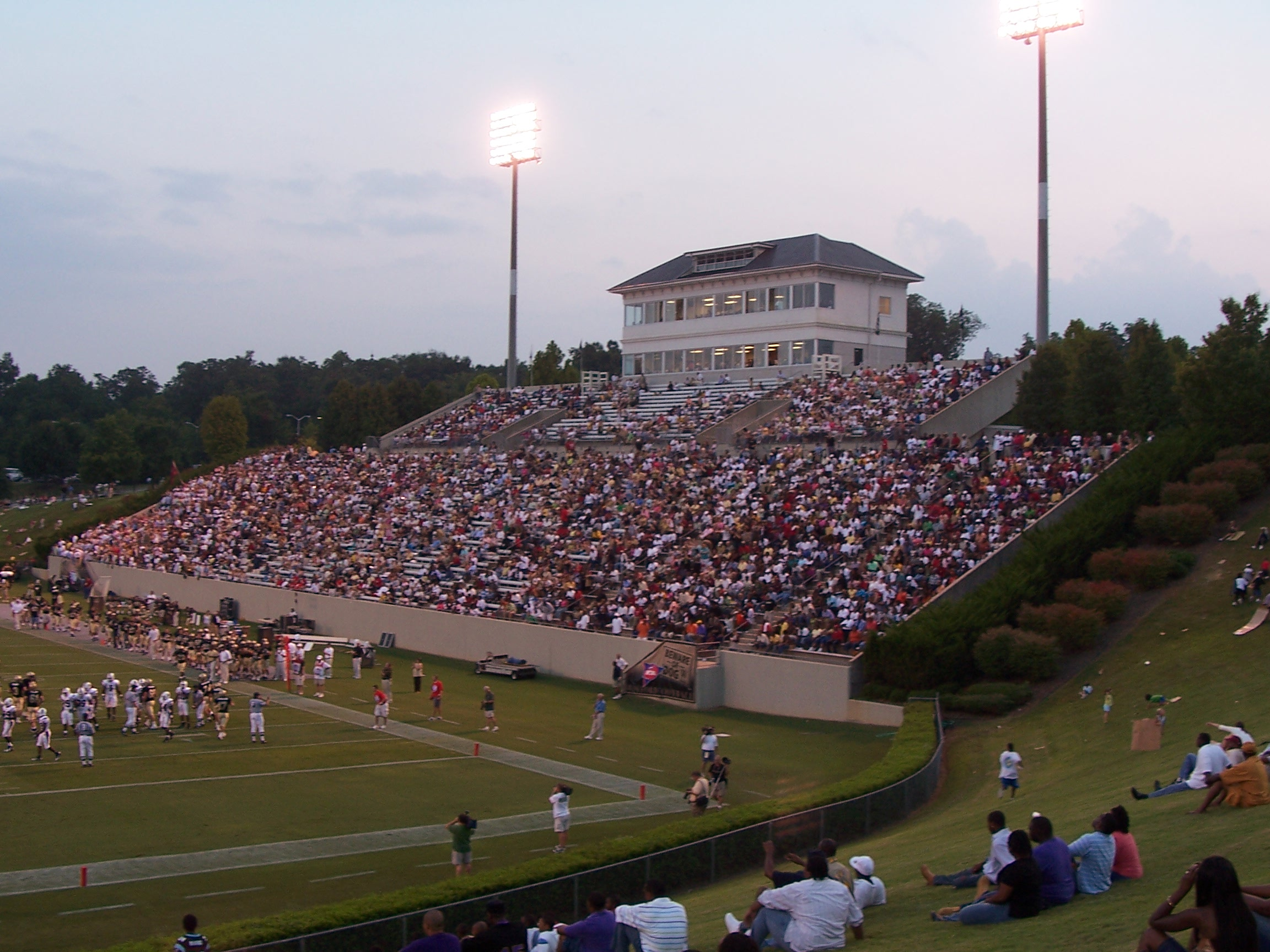
- The home side of Gibbs Stadium.
- Interactive map of Gibbs Stadium
- Location: 429 North Church Street; Spartanburg, SC 29303
- Owner: Wofford College
- Operator: Wofford College
- Capacity: 13,000
- Surface: Grass

Construction
- Groundbreaking: 1995
- Opened: October 5, 1996
- Cost: $4.5 million ($9.24 million in 2025 dollars)
- Architects: McMillan Smith and Partners
- General contractor: M.B. Kahn Construction

Tenant
- Wofford College Terriers Football

Gibbs Stadium is a 13,000-seat multi-purpose stadium in Spartanburg, South Carolina. It opened in 1996 and is home to the Wofford College Terriers football team. It is also formerly the home to the Spartanburg High School varsity football team. It is home to the 30th largest college football scoreboard in the nation at 1,485 square feet (138.0 m^{2}). It was named for the Gibbs family, long-time donors to Wofford, for their $1 million donation to build it.

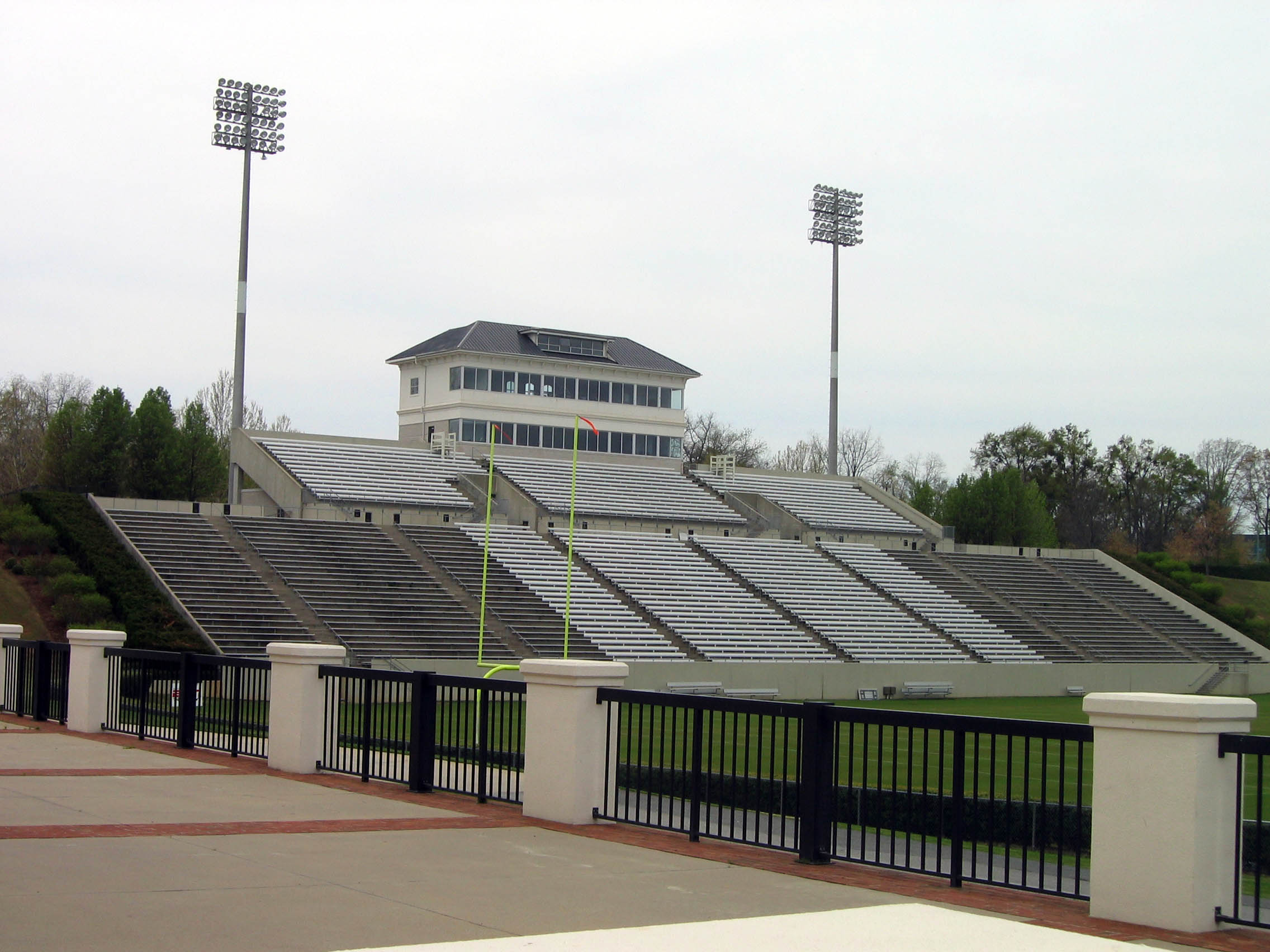
Gibbs Stadium, Home Stands

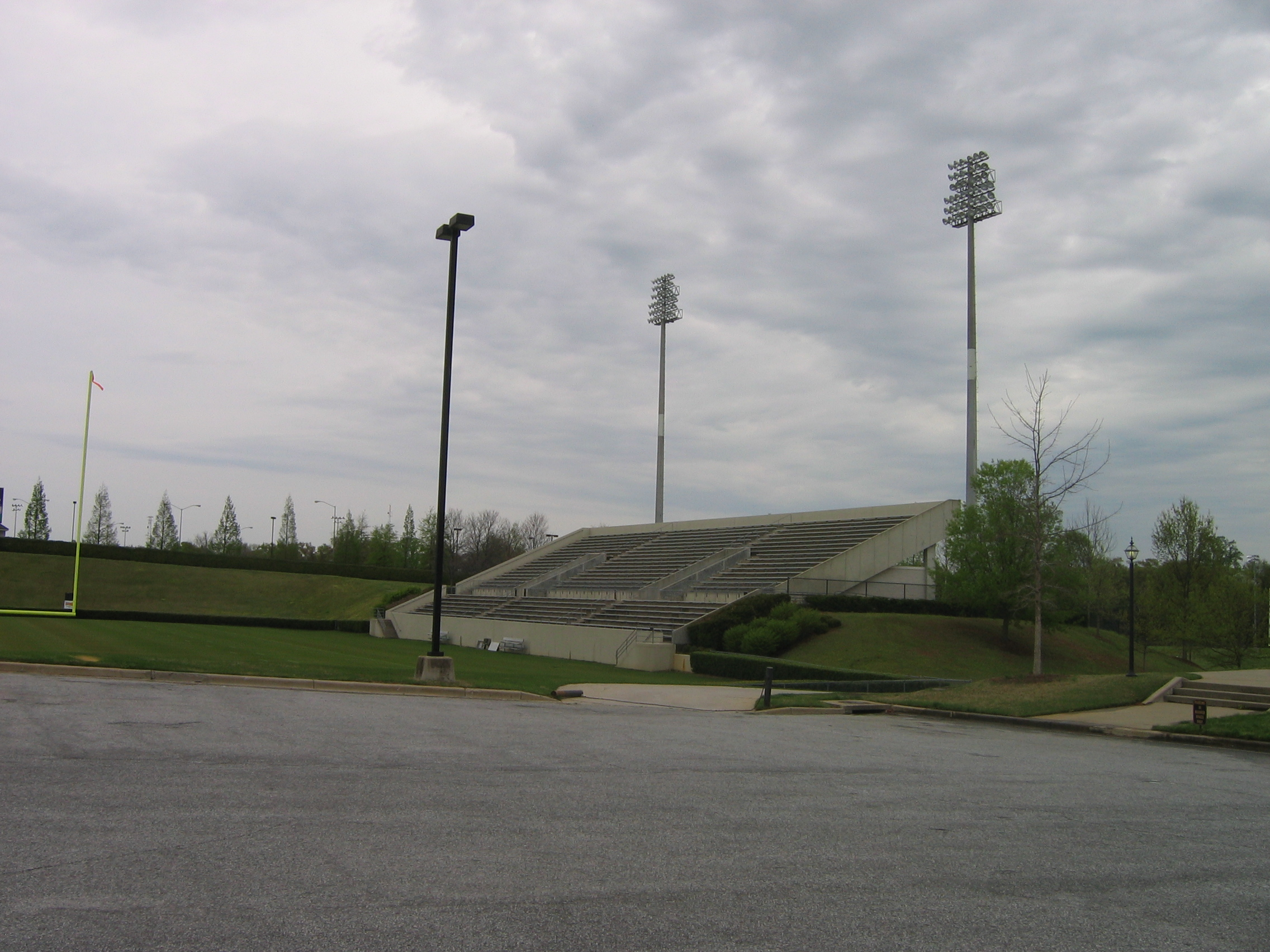
Gibbs Stadium, Visitor Stands

== See also ==
- List of NCAA Division I FCS football stadiums
