= Rhodes Stadium =

Multi-purpose stadium in North Carolina

Coordinates: 36°06′36″N 79°30′28″W

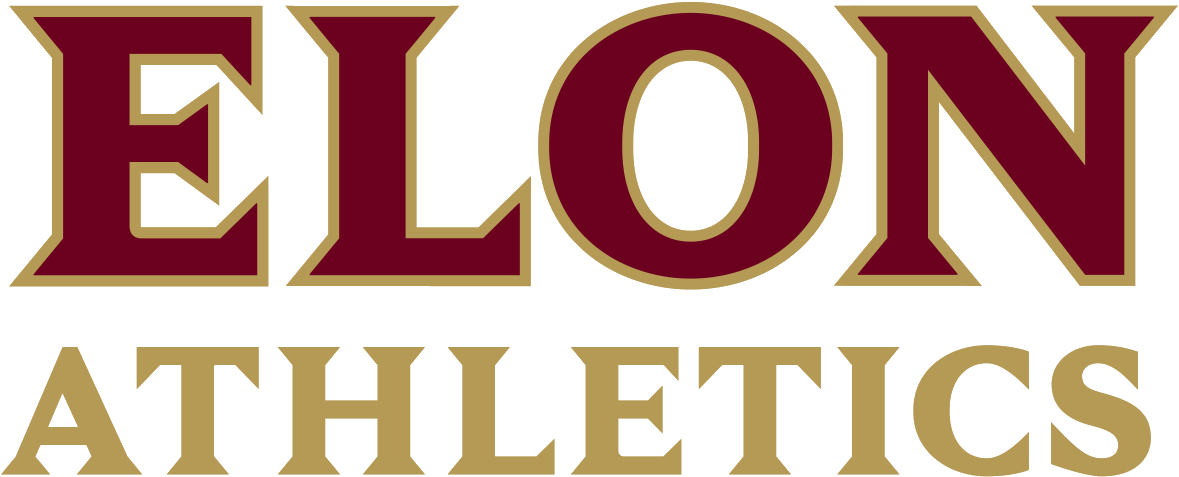

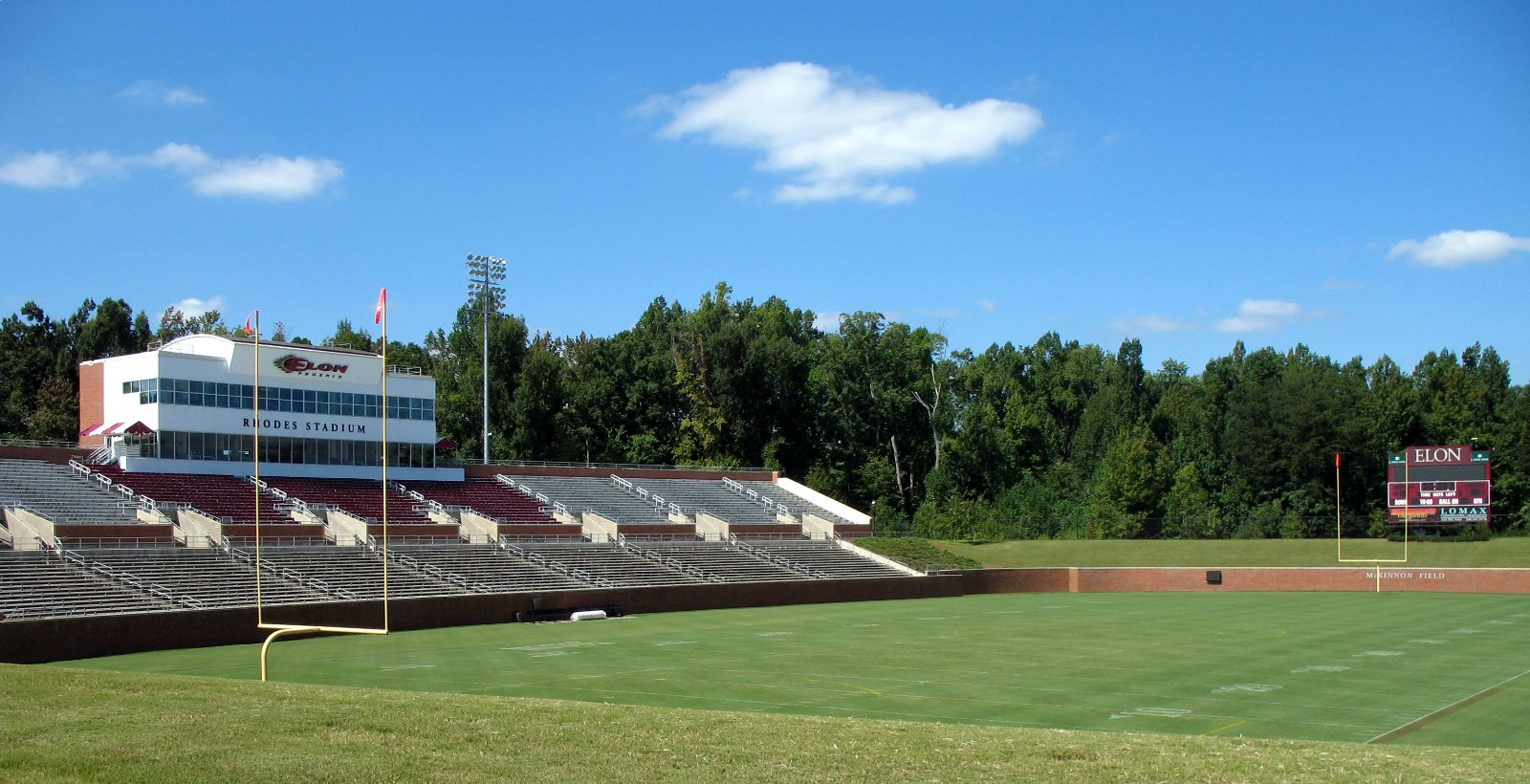
- Interior view in 2006
- Interactive map of Rhodes Stadium
- Full name: Rhodes Stadium at McKinnon Field
- Address: 1 Stadium Drive; Elon, North Carolina 27244
- Owner: Elon University
- Operator: Elon Athletics
- Capacity: 14,000
- Type: Stadium
- Surface: Grass
- Current use: Football

Construction
- Groundbreaking: March 14, 2000
- Opened: September 22, 2001; 25 years ago
- Cost: $13 million ($23.6 million in 2025 dollars)
- Architect: Ellerbe Becket
- General contractor: Beers Construction Co.

Tenant
- Elon Phoenix football (NCAA)

Website
- elonphoenix.com/rhodes-stadium

Rhodes Stadium is a 14,000-seat American football stadium located in Elon University of Elon, North Carolina. Named for trustee Dusty Rhodes, his wife, Peggy, and their family, the stadium opened in 2001 and is home to the Elon Phoenix football team.

Before Rhodes Stadium was built, Elon played (starting in 1949) their football games at Burlington Memorial Stadium, located in the Walter M. Williams High School of Burlington, NC.

The stadium has also hosted soccer and lacrosse games.

== Record attendances ==
#	Attend.	Elon rival	Score	Date	Ref.
1	14,167	Appalachian State	10–27	14 Nov 2009	
2	13,100	Appalachian State	32–49	29 Sep 2007	
3	12,705	William & Mary	14–6	30 Sep 2023	
4	11,926	James Madison	10–45	28 Sep 2019	
5	11,897	William & Mary	31–34	25 Sep 2021	

== See also ==
- List of NCAA Division I FCS football stadiums
