= List of college athletic programs in Georgia (U.S. state) =

This is a list of college athletic programs in the U.S. state of Georgia.

== NCAA ==
=== Division I ===
Full NCAA Division I member colleges in Georgia.
– FBS Football, – FCS Football

Team	School	City	Conference	Sport sponsorship						
Team	School	City	Conference	Foot- ball	Basketball		Base- ball	Soft- ball	Soccer	
Team	School	City	Conference	Foot- ball	M	W	Base- ball	Soft- ball	M	W
Georgia Bulldogs and Lady Bulldogs	University of Georgia	Athens	SEC	FBS	Yes	Yes	Yes	Yes	No	Yes
Georgia Southern Eagles	Georgia Southern University	Statesboro	Sun Belt	FBS	Yes	Yes	Yes	Yes	Yes	Yes
Georgia State Panthers	Georgia State University	Atlanta	Sun Belt	FBS	Yes	Yes	Yes	Yes	Yes	Yes
Georgia Tech Yellow Jackets	Georgia Institute of Technology	Atlanta	ACC	FBS	Yes	Yes	Yes	Yes	No	No
Kennesaw State Owls and Lady Owls	Kennesaw State University	Kennesaw	CUSA	FBS	Yes	Yes	Yes	Yes	No	Yes
Mercer Bears	Mercer University	Macon	Southern	FCS	Yes	Yes	Yes	Yes	Yes	Yes
West Georgia Wolves	University of West Georgia	Carrollton	United Athletic (Note: As of the 2026–27 academic year, West Georgia is in the third year of a three-year transition to Division I and will become an active member in 2027–28.)	FCS	Yes	Yes	Yes	Yes	No	Yes

=== Division II ===
Full NCAA Division II member colleges in Georgia.
– Football, – Non-Football

Team	School	City	Conference	Sport sponsorship						
Team	School	City	Conference	Foot- ball	Basketball		Base- ball	Soft- ball	Soccer	
Team	School	City	Conference	Foot- ball	M	W	Base- ball	Soft- ball	M	W
Albany State Golden Rams	Albany State University	Albany	SIAC	Yes	Yes	Yes	Yes	Yes	No	Yes (Note: Albany State's women's soccer team competes in the Peach Belt Conference.)
Augusta Jaguars	Augusta University	Augusta	Peach Belt	No	Yes	Yes	Yes	Yes	No	No
Clark Atlanta Panthers	Clark Atlanta University	Atlanta	SIAC	Yes	Yes	Yes	Yes	Yes	No	No
Clayton State Lakers	Clayton State University	Morrow	Peach Belt	No	Yes	Yes	No	No	Yes	Yes
Columbus State Cougars	Columbus State University	Columbus	Peach Belt	No	Yes	Yes	Yes	Yes	No	Yes
Emmanuel Lions	Emmanuel University	Franklin Springs	Carolinas	No	Yes	Yes	Yes	Yes	Yes	Yes
Fort Valley State Wildcats	Fort Valley State University	Fort Valley	SIAC	Yes	Yes	Yes	No	Yes	No	No
Georgia College Bobcats	Georgia College & State University	Milledgeville	Peach Belt	No	Yes	Yes	Yes	Yes	No	Yes
Georgia Southwestern State Hurricanes	Georgia Southwestern State University	Americus	Peach Belt	No	Yes	Yes	Yes	Yes	Yes	Yes
Middle Georgia State Knights	Middle Georgia State University (Note: As of the 2026–27 academic year, Middle Georgia is in the second year of a three-year transition to Division II and will become an active member in 2028–29.)	Cochran (Note: The majority of Middle Georgia State's athletic programs are located on the Cochran campus. The university's tennis, volleyball, and women's cross country programs are based at the Macon campus.)	Peach Belt	No	Yes	Yes	Yes	Yes	Yes	Yes
Morehouse Maroon Tigers	Morehouse College	Atlanta	SIAC	Yes	Yes	No	Yes	No	No	No
North Georgia Nighthawks	University of North Georgia	Dahlonega	Peach Belt	No	Yes	Yes	Yes	Yes	Yes	Yes
Savannah State Tigers and Lady Tigers	Savannah State University	Savannah	SIAC	Yes	Yes	Yes	Yes	Yes	No	No
Shorter Hawks	Shorter University	Rome	Gulf South	Yes	Yes	Yes	Yes	Yes	Yes	Yes
Valdosta State Blazers	Valdosta State University	Valdosta	Gulf South	Yes	Yes	Yes	Yes	Yes	No	Yes
Young Harris Mountain Lions	Young Harris College	Young Harris	Carolinas	No	Yes	Yes	Yes	Yes	Yes	Yes

=== Division III ===
Full NCAA Division III member colleges in Georgia.
– Football, – Non-Football

Team	School	City	Conference	Sport sponsorship						
Team	School	City	Conference	Foot- ball	Basketball		Base- ball	Soft- ball	Soccer	
Team	School	City	Conference	Foot- ball	M	W	Base- ball	Soft- ball	M	W
Agnes Scott Scotties	Agnes Scott College	Decatur	CCS	No	No	Yes	No	Yes	No	Yes
Berry Vikings	Berry College	Mount Berry	SAA	Yes	Yes	Yes	Yes	Yes	Yes	Yes
Covenant Scots	Covenant College	Lookout Mountain	CCS	No	Yes	Yes	Yes	Yes	Yes	Yes
Emory Eagles	Emory University	Atlanta	UAA	No	Yes	Yes	Yes	Yes	Yes	Yes
LaGrange Panthers	LaGrange College	LaGrange	CCS	Yes (Note: LaGrange's football team competes in USA South.)	Yes	Yes	Yes	Yes	Yes	Yes
Oglethorpe Stormy Petrels	Oglethorpe University	Brookhaven	SAA	No	Yes	Yes	Yes	No	Yes	Yes
Piedmont Lions	Piedmont University	Demorest	CCS	No	Yes	Yes	Yes	Yes	Yes	Yes

== NAIA ==
Full NAIA member colleges in Georgia.
– Football, – Non-Football - Women's Flag Football

Team	School	City	Conference	Sport sponsorship						
Team	School	City	Conference	Foot- ball	Basketball		Base- ball	Soft- ball	Soccer	
Team	School	City	Conference	Foot- ball	M	W	Base- ball	Soft- ball	M	W
Abraham Baldwin Golden Stallions	Abraham Baldwin Agricultural College	Tifton	Southern States	No	Yes	Yes	Yes	Yes	No	Yes
Andrew Fighting Tigers	Andrew College	Cuthbert	Southern States	Yes	Yes	Yes	Yes	Yes	Yes	Yes
Georgia Southern Golden Eagles	Georgia Southern University–East Georgia Campus	Swainsboro	Continental	No	Yes	Yes	Yes	Yes	No	No
Brenau Golden Tigers	Brenau University	Gainesville	Appalachian	No	No	Yes	No	Yes	No	Yes
Brewton–Parker Barons	Brewton–Parker Christian University	Mount Vernon	Southern States	No	Yes	Yes	Yes	Yes	Yes	Yes
Coastal Georgia Mariners	College of Coastal Georgia	Brunswick	The Sun	No	Yes	Yes	No	Yes	No	No
Dalton State Roadrunners	Dalton State College	Dalton	Southern States	No	Yes	No	No	No	Yes	Yes
Georgia Gwinnett Grizzlies	Georgia Gwinnett College	Lawrenceville	Independent	No	Yes	Yes	Yes	Yes	Yes	Yes
Life Running Eagles	Life University	Marietta	Southern States	(Note: Life sponsors flag football as a women's varsity sport and compete in the Sun Conference.)	Yes	Yes	No	No	Yes	Yes
Point Skyhawks	Point University	West Point	Southern States	Yes (Note: Point, Reinhardt, and Thomas additionally sponsor flag football as a women's varsity sport and compete in the Sun Conference.)	Yes	Yes	Yes	Yes	Yes	Yes
Reinhardt Eagles	Reinhardt University	Waleska	Appalachian	Yes	Yes	Yes	Yes	Yes	Yes	Yes
SCAD Bees	Savannah College of Art and Design	Savannah	The Sun	No	No	No	No	No	Yes	Yes
Thomas Night Hawks	Thomas University	Thomasville	Southern States	Yes	Yes	Yes	Yes	Yes	Yes	Yes
Truett McConnell Bears	Truett McConnell University	Cleveland	Appalachian	No	Yes	Yes	Yes	Yes	Yes	Yes
Wesleyan Wolves	Wesleyan College	Macon	Southern States	No	No	Yes	No	Yes	No	Yes

== NJCAA ==
Team	School	City	Conference
Albany Tech Titans	Albany Technical College	Albany	Georgia Collegiate
Central Georgia Tech Titans	Central Georgia Technical College	Macon	Georgia Collegiate
Georgia Highlands Chargers	Georgia Highlands College	Rome	Georgia Collegiate
Georgia Military Bulldogs	Georgia Military College	Milledgeville	Georgia Collegiate
Gordon Highlanders	Gordon College	Barnesville	Georgia Collegiate
Oxford Eagles	Oxford College of Emory University	Oxford	Georgia Collegiate
South Georgia State Hawks	South Georgia State College	Douglas	Georgia Collegiate
South Georgia Tech Jets	South Georgia Technical College	Americus	Georgia Collegiate
Southern Crescent Tech Tigers	Southern Crescent Technical College	Griffin	Georgia Collegiate

== NCCAA ==
Team	School	City	Conference
Carver Cougars	Carver College	Atlanta	Independent
Paine Lions	Paine College	Augusta	Independent
Toccoa Falls Eagles	Toccoa Falls College	Toccoa Falls	Independent

== See also ==
- List of NCAA Division I institutions
- List of NCAA Division II institutions
- List of NCAA Division III institutions
- List of NAIA institutions
- List of USCAA institutions
- List of NCCAA institutions
- List of NJCAA Division I institutions
- List of NJCAA Division II institutions
- List of NJCAA Division III institutions
