= Kevin Crawford (scholar) =

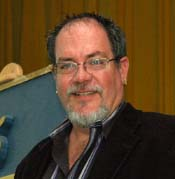
- Reinhardt University Associate Professor of English
- Born: 25 April 1970; West Palm Beach, Florida, United States
- Died: 2 December 2013 (aged 43)
- Occupation: Scholar
- Known for: Founding member of the Palm Beach Shakespeare Festival

Academic background
- Education: Florida Atlantic University; University of Alabama

Academic work
- Discipline: Scholar of William Shakespeare and Thomas Middleton

Kevin Scott Crawford (25 April 1970 - 2 December 2013) was a scholar of William Shakespeare and Thomas Middleton and a founding member of the Palm Beach Shakespeare Festival.

== Biography ==
Crawford was born in West Palm Beach, Florida, and attended Palm Beach Gardens High School. He received his BA and MA from Florida Atlantic University and his Ph.D. in Renaissance drama from the University of Alabama's Hudson Strode Program (2005), with Gary Taylor as his dissertation director. He was appointed assistant professor of English at Reinhardt University, in Waleska, Georgia in 2007. In 1990 he was co-founder of the Palm Beach Shakespeare Festival, which produced "Shakespeare by the Sea"; Crawford directed and performed at the festival annually, for 23 years, in productions of plays by Shakespeare and Middleton.

He has published in Medieval and Renaissance Drama in England, Shakespeare Bulletin, and Shakespeare Yearbook, and was one of the editors for the online edition of Middleton's collected works, published by Oxford UP. In 2010, 2011 and 2012 he received faculty awards for his research and artistic performances.

Crawford died, unexpectedly, in December 2013; services were held at Reinhardt and in Stratford-upon-Avon; the Dr. Kevin Crawford Memorial Scholarship Fund was established at Reinhardt. His cause of death was liver failure.
