= Mercer Bears =

- University: Mercer University
- Nickname: Bears
- NCAA: Division I (FCS)
- Conference: SoCon (primary); ASUN (men's lacrosse); Big South (women's lacrosse); Sun Belt (beach volleyball)
- Athletic director: Jim Cole
- Location: Macon, Georgia
- Varsity teams: 18 (8 men's, 10 women's)
- Football stadium: Tony and Nancy Moye Football and Lacrosse Complex
- Basketball arena: Hawkins Arena
- Baseball stadium: Claude Smith Field
- Softball stadium: Sikes Field
- Soccer stadium: Betts Stadium
- Colors: Black and orange
- Mascot: Toby
- Website: mercerbears.com

The Mercer Bears are the athletic teams of Mercer University in Macon, Georgia, United States. Mercer is the only private university in Georgia with an NCAA Division I athletic program and fields teams in eight men's and nine women's sports. The university competes in the Southern Conference for most sports. In 2013, the football team competed in the Pioneer Football League.

Mercer joined the Southern Conference as a full member on July 1, 2014; all university-sponsored sports compete in the Southern Conference except men's and women's lacrosse and women's beach volleyball, which are not sponsored by the conference.

== Sports teams ==
A member of the Southern Conference, Mercer University sponsors teams in eight men's and ten women's NCAA sanctioned sports:

Men's sports	Women's sports
Baseball	Basketball
Basketball	Beach volleyball^{1}
Cross Country	Cross Country
Football	Golf
Golf	Lacrosse^{2}
Lacrosse^{3}	Soccer
Soccer	Softball
Tennis	Tennis
	Track and field^{4}
	Volleyball
^{1}competes in the Sun Belt Conference^{2}competes in the Big South Conference^{3}competes in the ASUN Conference^{4}outdoor only

== History and conference affiliations ==
SoCon's logo in Mercer's colors

Mercer was a member of the Southern Intercollegiate Athletic Association (SIAA) from 1906 to 1911 and from 1919 to 1937; the university won the conference championship in basketball in 1922 and 1924. Prior to 1924, the sports teams were known as the 'Baptists' rather than the Bears. Without leaving the SIAA, which focused mostly on basketball and track, Mercer was a charter member of the Dixie Conference in 1930; the university played football in the new conference from 1930 to 1942 and won the conference championship in 1932. Mercer suspended athletics in 1942 during World War II, but rejoined the Dixie Conference from 1948 to 1954 in all sports (except football, Mercer did not revive the sport after the war). The university won the Dixie Conference tournament championship in basketball in 1951, 1952 and 1954; Mercer won the regular season championship in 1950, 1952 and 1953.

Mercer began competition in women's basketball in 1970; the team won the Southern Women's Athletic Conference championship in 1972. The university, competing in the Georgia Association for Intercollegiate Athletics for Women, won the conference championship in 1974, 1976, 1979, 1980 (tournament and regular season) and 1982 (regular season). In 1985, Mercer advanced to the NCAA Division II Final Four; the team was defeated (82–79) by Central Missouri State University. Mercer was a charter member of the New South Women's Athletic Conference in 1985–86 and won the conference championship in 1991; the conference merged with the Trans America Athletic Conference (TAAC; now known as the ASUN Conference) the same year.

Mercer became a charter member of the TAAC in 1978 and was the only charter member remaining with the conference before moving to the Southern Conference. The men's basketball team won the conference championship and advanced to the NCAA Division I tournament in 1981; the team was defeated (73–67) by the University of Arkansas. Mercer won the conference championship and advanced to the NCAA Division I tournament again in 1985; the team was defeated (65–58) by Georgia Tech.

Mercer discontinued football in 1942. The sport was reinstated in 2013; Mercer competed in the non-scholarship Pioneer Football League for the 2013 season.

Mercer joined the Southern Conference on July 1, 2014; the university accepted an invitation on May 30, 2013, and joined alongside East Tennessee State University and Virginia Military Institute. Mercer shifted from non-scholarship to scholarship football when it joined the conference.

== Championships ==
Mercer joined the Southern Conference on July 1, 2014. The university was previously a member of the ASUN Conference (then known as the Atlantic Sun Conference); Mercer won 21 ASUN championships (12 tournament and nine regular season) including four in the spring of 2014. Mercer won four championships in its first year in the SoCon (two tournament and two regular season).

Southern Conference Tournament Championships

Soccer (M)	2016
Baseball	2015
Soccer (W)	2014

Southern Conference Regular Season Championships

Basketball (W)	2016, 2017
Baseball	2015
Soccer (M)	2014

ASUN Conference Tournament Championships

Baseball	1979, 1981, 1983, 2010
Basketball (M)	1981, 1985, 2014
Golf (M)	2014
Soccer (M)	1992, 1999, 2001
Soccer (W)	2010

ASUN Conference Regular Season Championships

Baseball	2013
Basketball (M)	2003, 2013, 2014
Basketball (W)	1991, 1992
Lacrosse (M)	2014
Soccer (M)	2000, 2002

CollegeInsider.com Postseason Tournament (CIT) Championship

The men's basketball team won the CollegeInsider.com Postseason Tournament following the 2011–12 season, the first Atlantic Sun Conference team to win a postseason championship. During the tournament, the team defeated Tennessee State University, Georgia State University, Old Dominion University and Fairfield University en route to the championship game at Utah State University; Mercer won the championship game 70–67. The championship capped the best season in university history; the team finished the season with a 27–11 record.

== Athletics director ==
Jim Cole, a Mercer graduate and a former minor league, professional baseball player in the Milwaukee Brewers system, is Mercer's athletics director. Cole, a former member of the Georgia House of Representatives, served as Governor Sonny Perdue's floor leader in the House and was selected to become Georgia Secretary of State in December 2009. He declined the appointment to become athletics director. Since becoming athletics director, Cole has overseen the addition of men's lacrosse, women's lacrosse, and sand volleyball; the reinstatement of football; and the construction of Mercer's football and lacrosse complex.

Cole replaced Bobby Pope who retired on June 30, 2010 after 21 years as athletics director. Pope was affiliated with Mercer for 40 years starting in 1970 as a radio announcer, and in 1980 became sports information director. He became athletics director in 1989 and oversaw construction of the University Center and renovation of the baseball, softball, and tennis facilities. Pope was inducted into Mercer's Hall of Fame in 2010.

== Notable coaches ==
- Bill Bibb – men's basketball head coach (1974–89), compiled a record of 222–194 (the most wins in Mercer history) including three Atlantic Sun Conference championships and two NCAA Division I tournament appearances; served as commissioner of the Atlantic Sun Conference (1991–2007); namesake of the Bill Bibb Trophy awarded annually to the conference's best athletic program
- Bill Hodges – men's basketball head coach (1991–97); before coming to Mercer, coached Larry Bird at Indiana State University and finished second in the 1979 NCAA Men's Division I Basketball Tournament
- Bob Hoffman – men's basketball head coach (2008–present); Mercer won the 2011–12 CollegeInsider.com Postseason Tournament, the first Atlantic Sun Conference team to win a postseason championship; Atlantic Sun Conference coach of the year (2013 and 2014)
- Bobby Lamb – football head coach (2011–present, Mercer began competition in 2013); before coming to Mercer, head coach at Furman University; Southern Conference player of the year (1985) and Southern Conference coach of the year (2004)
- Bernie Moore – football head coach (1926–28); after leaving Mercer, served as football head coach at Louisiana State University and as commissioner of the Southeastern Conference
- Mark Slonaker – men's basketball head coach (1997–2008); named the 2002–03 Jim Phelan National Coach of the Year after leading Mercer to the best one season turnaround in NCAA history, 6–23 to 23–6
- Claude Smith – baseball coach (1948–77), compiled a record of 405-314-2; namesake of Mercer's Claude Smith Field
- Barry Myers Head Baseball Coach
- Cy Young – baseball coach (1903–05); Mercer won the Georgia State Championship all three years (1903–05)

== Sports ==
=== Football ===
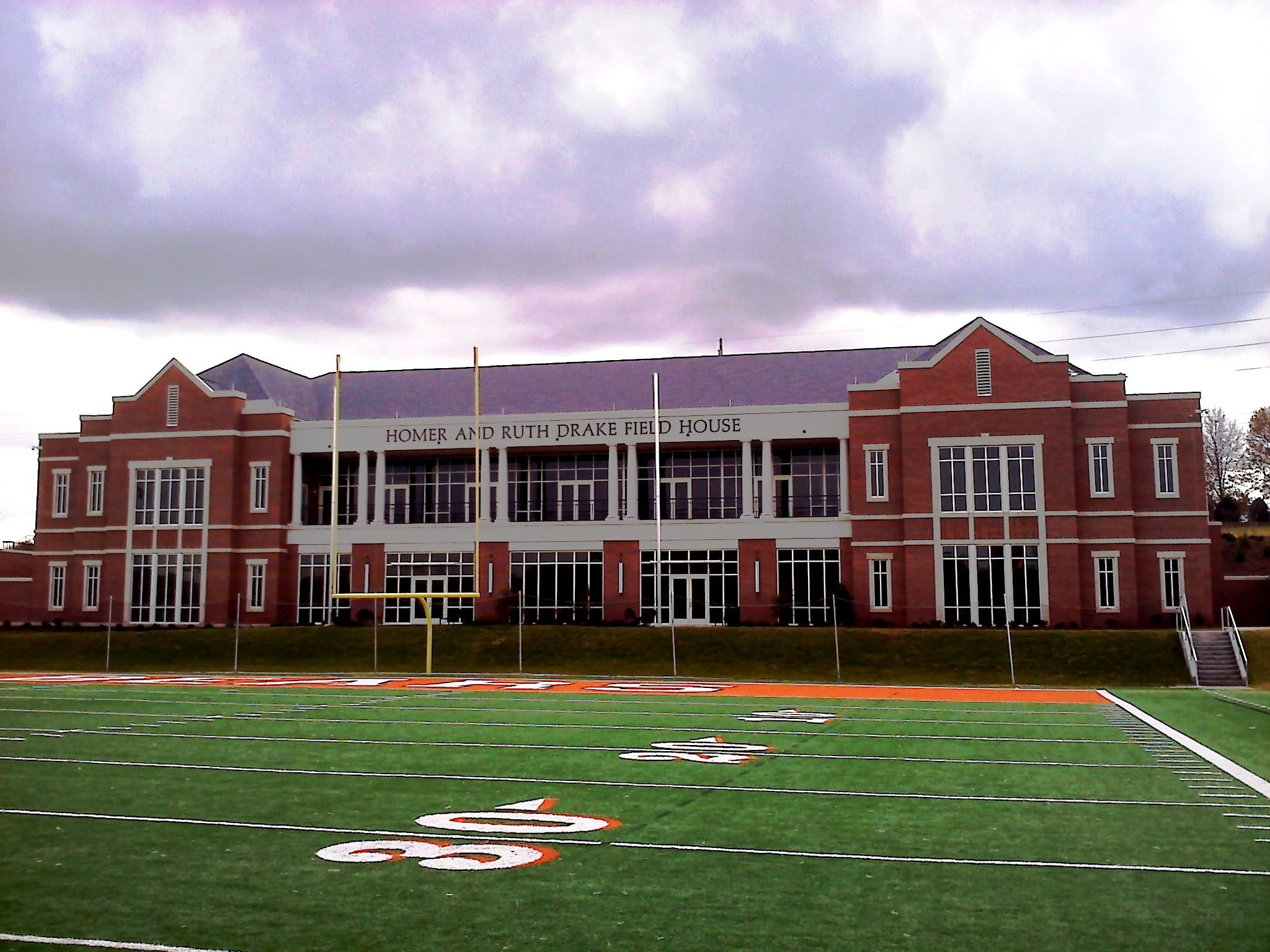
Homer and Ruth Drake Field House, a component of the Tony and Nancy Moye Football and Lacrosse Complex

Reinstatement – NCAA Record Wins

On November 19, 2010, Mercer announced the reinstatement of intercollegiate football beginning in the fall of 2013. In 2013, Mercer competed as an NCAA Division I FCS non-scholarship program in the Pioneer Football League; in 2014, Mercer began competing as a scholarship program in the Southern Conference. Reinstatement came after a 70-year hiatus; the university suspended football during World War II and did not revive it. The final game was in 1941.

The modern Mercer football program played its first game on August 31, 2013; the team defeated Reinhardt University before an overflow crowd (12,172 spectators) at the Tony and Nancy Moye Football and Lacrosse Complex. Mercer finished the 2013 season undefeated at home with a 10–2 win–loss record (the two road losses were to the University of San Diego and Marist College), setting an NCAA Division I record for wins (10) by a start-up football program; Mercer had eight home wins..However, four of Mercer wins were from competing against teams in lower division levels of competition (3-NAIA schools and 1-Division III school) also an NCAA Division I record tied the same year (2013) by Auburn University, the FBS national runner-up, and Sam Houston State University who achieved its eighth victory in the FCS post-season. Mercer won its first game in the Southern Conference on September 27, 2014; the team defeated Virginia Military Institute on the road in Lexington, Virginia. Mercer finished its first season in the SoCon, and its second season since reinstatement, placing in last place in the SoCon, with an overall 6–6 win–loss record (1–5 in the conference) .

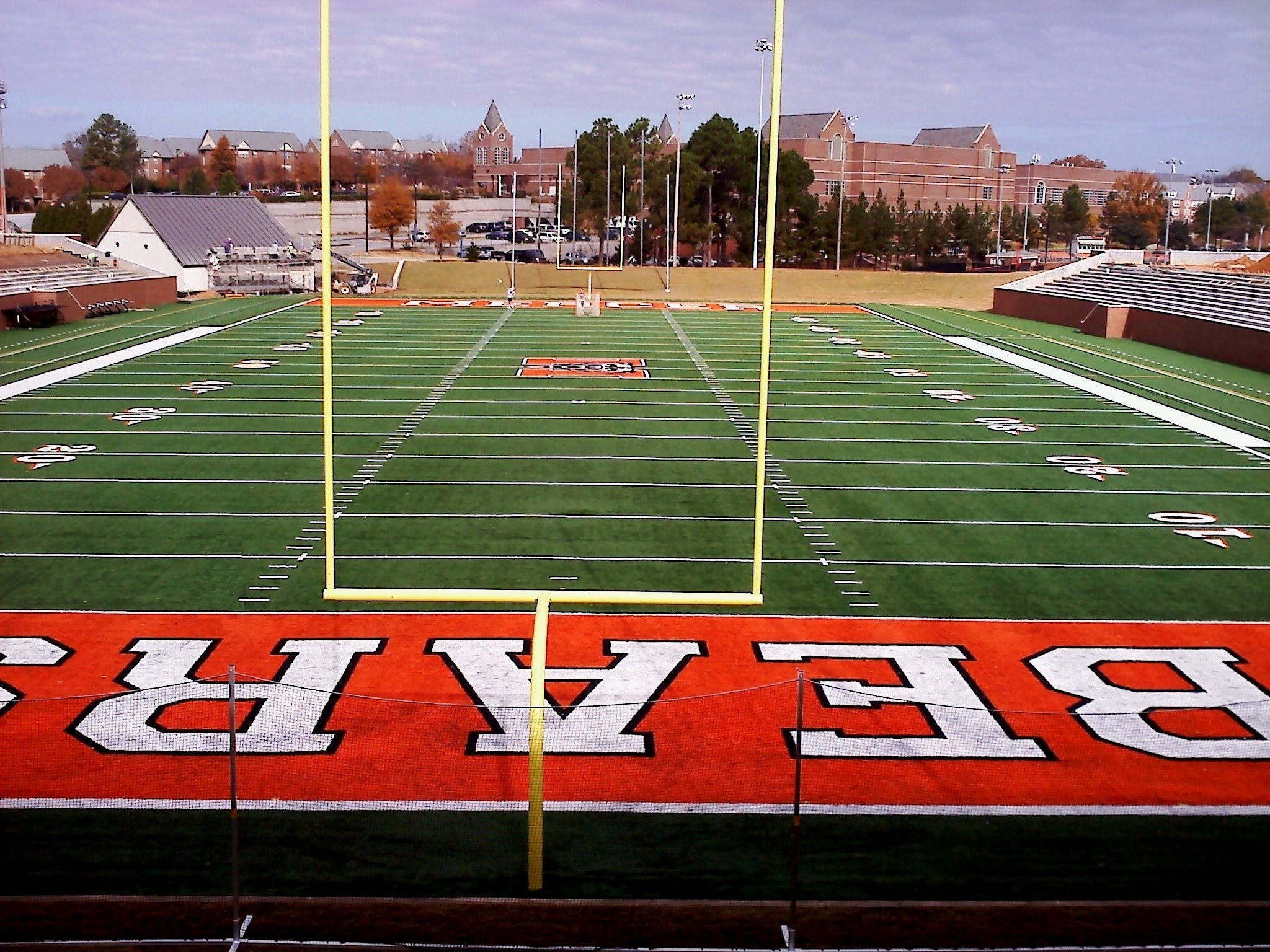
Tony and Nancy Moye Football and Lacrosse Complex (under construction, view from the Homer and Ruth Drake Field House)

History

The reinstatement of football revives a storied university program. Mercer and the University of Georgia competed in the first football game in Georgia; UGA won 50–0 on January 15, 1892. Later the same year, Mercer played Georgia Tech in Tech's first football game; Mercer won 12–6 on November 5, 1892. Mercer football alumni include Wally Butts, one of the greatest personalities in Georgia sports history. After his playing days at Mercer, Butts served as the head coach at UGA from 1939 to 1960 and as the school's athletic director from 1939 to 1963; he is a member of the Georgia Sports Hall of Fame and the College Football Hall of Fame. Other notable alumni are Joseph "Phoney" Smith and Bill Yoast. Smith was an All-American halfback and is Mercer's all-time leading scorer; he scored 176 points and later played for the semi-professional Ironton Tanks. Yoast is the high school coach made famous in the movie Remember the Titans.

Bobby Lamb – Head Coach

On January 20, 2011, Mercer announced the hiring of Bobby Lamb as its new head football coach. Lamb compiled a record of 67–40 in nine seasons as the head coach at Furman University from 2002 to 2010. He played quarterback at Furman from 1982 to 1985 and was the Southern Conference player of the year in 1985. Lamb was an assistant coach at Furman from 1986 until he became head coach in 2002. He resigned from Furman after compiling a record of 5–6 for the 2010 season, his only losing season in nine years. Lamb is a Georgia native; he was born in Augusta and graduated from high school in Commerce. Lamb's record in his first two seasons at Mercer was 16–6.

=== Men's basketball ===
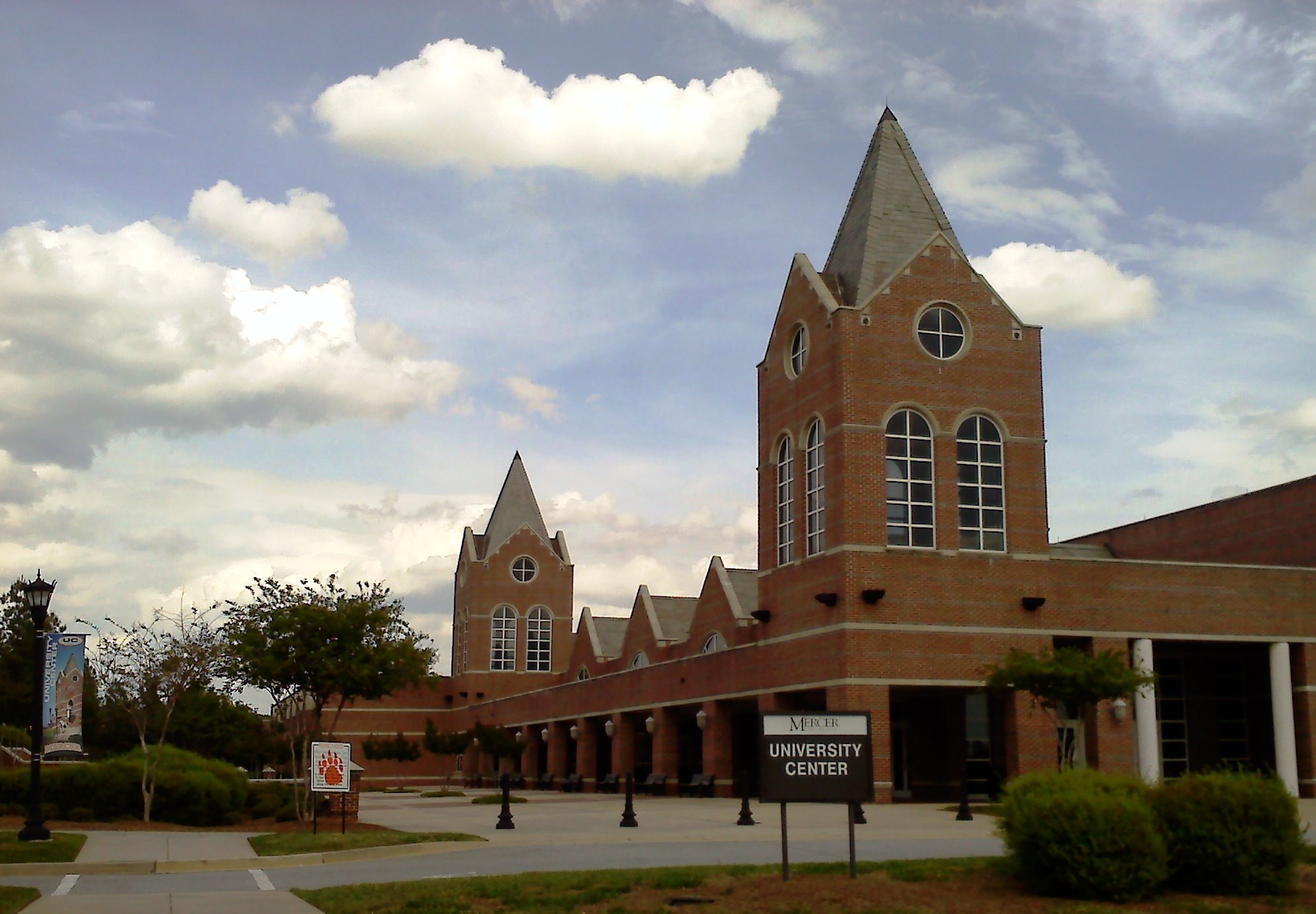
University Center (Hawkins Arena)

Bob Hoffman – Head Coach

Bob Hoffman was named men's basketball head coach in 2008. Prior to Mercer, Hoffman was head coach at Oklahoma Baptist and Texas-Pan American, as well as the Rio Grande Valley Vipers, an NBA D-League team. Hoffman's overall record as a head coach at the collegiate level is 499–243 (as of the end of the 2012–13 season) including 99 wins at Mercer during his first five seasons (2008–13). His Mercer wins include victories over Alabama (twice), Auburn, Duke, Georgia Tech, Florida State (then the defending Atlantic Coast Conference champion), and Tennessee.

History

Hoffman replaced Mark Slonaker who served as head coach for ten seasons and was the 2002–03 Jim Phelan National Coach of the Year. Slonaker received that award after leading Mercer to the best one season turnaround in NCAA history, improving from 6–23 to 23–6. The team won the Atlantic Sun regular season championship with a 14–2 conference record and made school history for number of wins (23); Mercer won 22 games in 1923–24 and 1984–85. The season ended with a loss in the Atlantic Sun tournament. Slonaker was the first National Coach of the Year to receive the award after it was named in honor of Jim Phelan. The four other finalists were Lute Olson (Arizona), Skip Prosser (Wake Forest), Bo Ryan (Wisconsin), and Tubby Smith (Kentucky). Mercer did not maintain this level of success, which prompted the university to hire a new head coach.

Mercer's basketball alumni include Sam Mitchell, a retired NBA player who became head coach of the Toronto Raptors. Mitchell was drafted with the seventh pick of the third round (54th overall) by the Houston Rockets in the 1985 NBA draft. He scored nearly 2,000 points at Mercer, the leading scorer in team history, and led Mercer to the 1985 Trans-America Athletic Conference regular season and tournament championships. More recent alumni include Will Emerson, a forward on the men's basketball team, who was the 2004–05 and 2005–06 Atlantic Sun Conference Male Student Athlete of the Year, only the third person to be selected twice for the award. Emerson was also named to ESPN the Magazine's Academic All-American first team in 2005 and 2006.

Mercer received national attention in November 2007 when the team defeated USC, which was ranked 18th in the nation at the time of the game.

Recent Achievements

In 2012, Mercer won the CollegeInsider.com Postseason Tournament following the 2011–12 season; the first Atlantic Sun Conference team to win a postseason championship. During the tournament, the team defeated Tennessee State, Georgia State, Old Dominion and Fairfield en route to the championship game at Utah State University; Mercer won the championship game 70–67. The championship capped the best season in university history; the team finished the season with a 27–11 record.

In 2013, Mercer won the conference regular season championship and advanced to the National Invitation Tournament, defeating Tennessee before losing to BYU; the team finished the season with a 24–12 record, the first time in university history that the team had back-to-back 20-win seasons. Mercer had opened the season ranked first in the conference preseason standings; during the season, notable wins included victories over defending Atlantic Coast Conference champion Florida State and Alabama.

In 2014, Mercer won the conference regular season championship for the second year in a row (co-champion, tied with Florida Gulf Coast) and the conference tournament championship; the team defeated Florida Gulf Coast for the tournament championship and advanced to the NCAA Tournament for the first time since 1985. During the regular season, notable wins included victories over Seton Hall and Ole Miss. At the conclusion of the conference tournament, Mercer had a record of 26–8, the first time in university history the team had three straight 20-win seasons. Mercer coach Bob Hoffman was honored as the conference coach of the year for the second consecutive year; Mercer players were honored as the conference player of the year (guard, Langston Hall), defensive player of the year (forward, Daniel Coursey), and scholar-athlete of the year (forward, Jakob Gollon). Mercer defeated Duke in the second round of the NCAA Tournament before losing to Tennessee in the third round. The team finished the season with a 27–9 record.

=== Women's basketball ===
Susie Gardner – Head Coach

Susie Gardner was named women's basketball head coach in 2010. She replaced Jannell Jones who resigned to become the head coach of California State University, Los Angeles; Jones compiled a 35–56 record during three seasons at Mercer. Gardner, former head coach at the University of Arkansas and Austin Peay University, was most recently an assistant coach at the University of Florida. She is a graduate of the University of Georgia and compiled a 64–54 record in four seasons at Arkansas and a 112–93 record in seven seasons at Austin Peay. Gardner is the tenth head coach in Mercer's 41 years of women's basketball.

Recent achievements

In 2013, Mercer advanced to the post-season Women's Basketball Invitational losing to McNeese State University; the team finished the season with a 20–12 record, the first 20-win season since 1991–92. The post-season appearance was Mercer's first in a nationally sponsored tournament since 1985.

=== Baseball ===
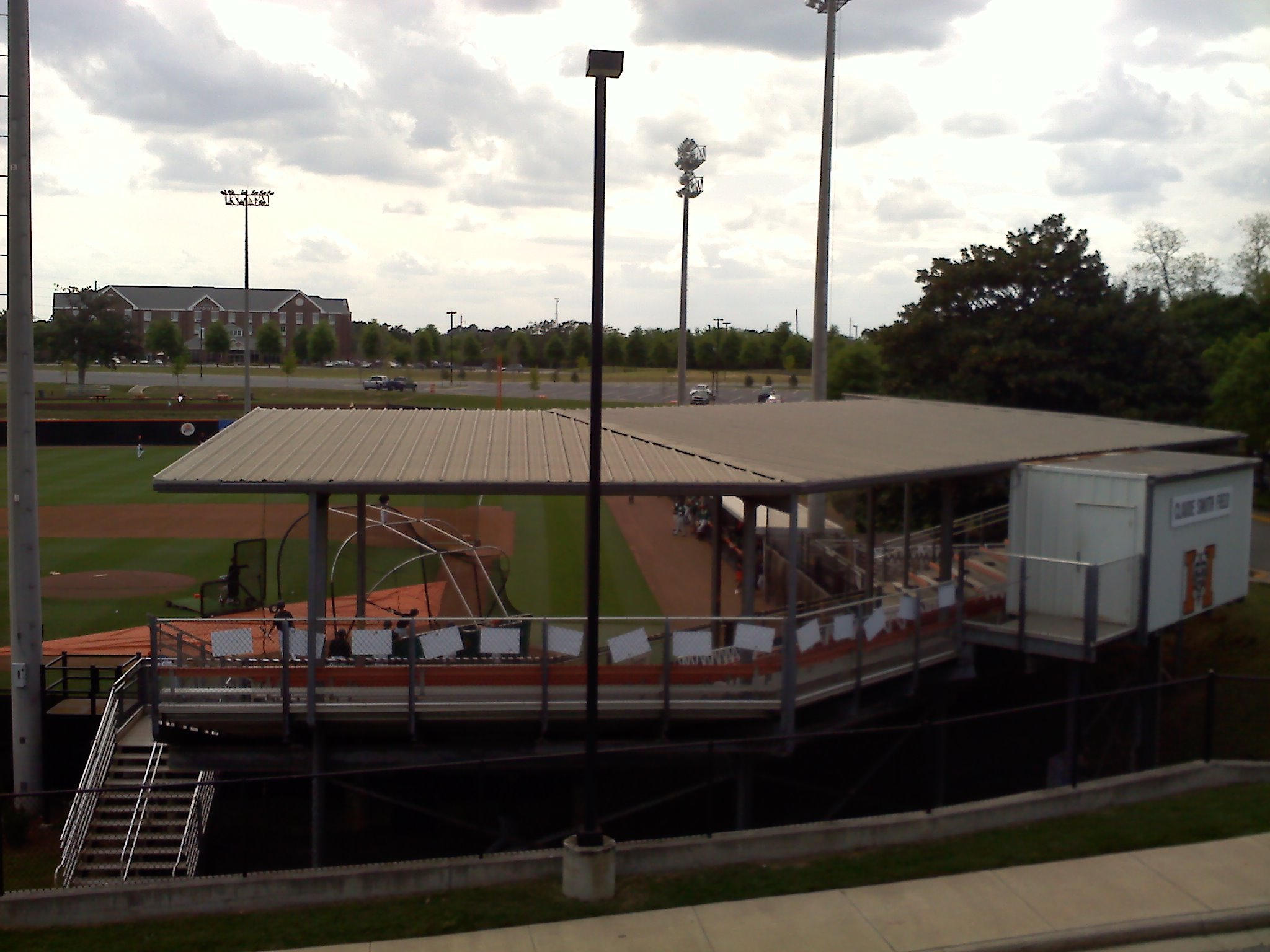
Claude Smith Field (baseball)

History

Mercer fielded its first baseball team in 1871. Cy Young coached the team from 1903 to 1905 winning three Georgia State Championships. In recent years, Mercer has won five Atlantic Sun Conference championships including the university's first regular season title in 2013. Since the program began in 1871, ten Mercer players have advanced to the Major Leagues.

First Pitch Classic

Mercer opens each baseball season with the annual First Pitch Classic. First held in 2009, the event welcomes a distinguished guest with extensive baseball experience to the Macon campus; highlights include an autograph session and an evening banquet featuring the guest as the primary speaker. Speakers have included Jeff Francoeur (2009), Gordon Beckham (2010), John Smoltz (2011), Chipper Jones (2012), and Dale Murphy (2013).

Recent Achievements

In 2010 under head coach Craig Gibson, Mercer won the conference tournament championship for the first time since 1983. Mercer, with a 37–22 record, advanced to the NCAA Division I Atlanta Regional where the team defeated Elon University, but lost to Georgia Tech and the University of Alabama. The team finished the season with a 38–24 record, one of the most successful in university history.

In 2013, Mercer won the conference regular season championship and advanced to the NCAA Division I Starkville Regional losing to the University of South Alabama and the University of Central Arkansas. The team finished the season with a 43–18 record, the best in university history. With the conclusion of the 2013 NCAA Baseball College World Series, Mercer finished the season as the top fielding (.982 percentage) team in the nation out of all 296 eligible Division I teams; Mercer edged out the University of Nebraska–Lincoln, the University of California, Irvine and the University of Oregon. In addition, junior outfielder Derrick Workman was named a first team Capital One Academic All-American, one of only eleven players in nation selected for this honor.

=== Lacrosse ===
History Mercer added men's lacrosse during the 2010–11 academic year (2011 season); women's lacrosse was added for 2014–15 (2015 season). The programs are the first in Georgia at the NCAA Division I level. The men's team won its first victory on March 19, 2011 against Carthage College.

Recent achievements

The ASUN Conference (then the Atlantic Sun Conference) began sponsoring men's lacrosse in 2014; on February 22, 2014, Mercer won the conference opener, defeating Richmond. Mercer went on to win the conference regular season championship (co-champion with High Point); the Bears were defeated in the opening round of the conference tournament. Mercer joined the Southern Conference on July 1, 2014; on the same day, the Southern Conference took over sponsorship of men's lacrosse from the Atlantic Sun Conference.

The SoCon dropped men's lacrosse after the 2022 season due to conference realignment, and Mercer returned men's lacrosse to the ASUN (which had reinstated men's lacrosse in the 2022 season).

== Facilities ==
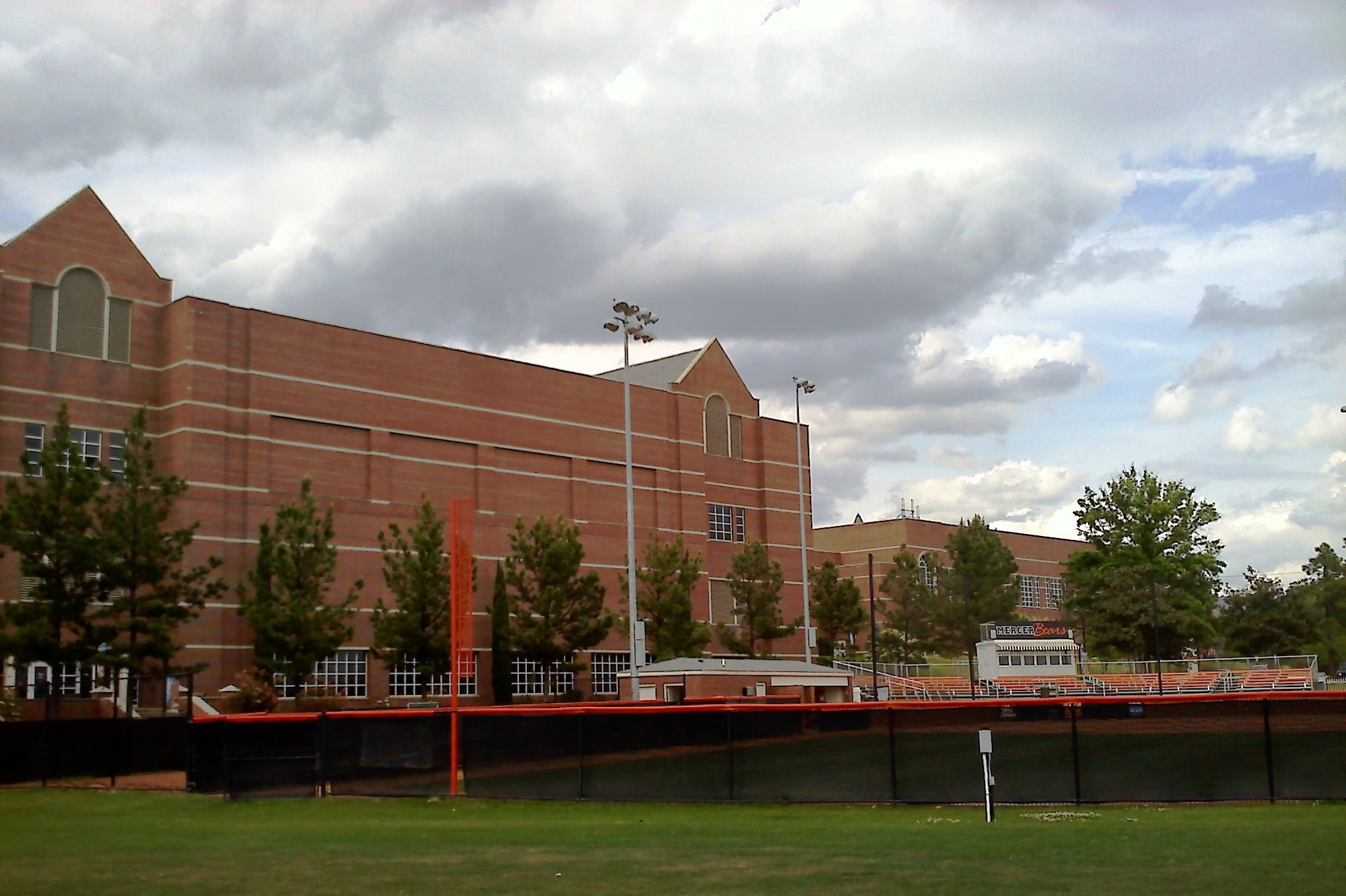
University Center (Hawkins Arena) and Sikes Field (softball)

Mercer opened the University Center (also known as Hawkins Arena) on the Macon campus in 2004. The $40 million 230,000-square-foot (21,000 m^{2}) center houses Mercer's athletics department, a 3,500-seat basketball arena, an indoor pool, work-out facilities, intramural basketball courts, an air-rifle range, offices, a food court, and numerous meeting facilities. Mercer's Claude Smith Field (baseball), Sikes Field (softball), and intramural fields are next to the center along with the university's tennis complex. Betts Stadium, the home of men's and women's soccer, is located on the eastern edge of campus between the School of Medicine and the university's newest intramural fields. In 2007, a 101-room Hilton Garden Inn opened on university-owned land adjacent to the University Center.

The University Center arena was named Hawkins Arena in April 2012. The naming honors J. B. Hawkins, former high school athletic director and basketball coach in Crawford County.

In November 2011, the university began construction of the 10,200-seat Tony and Nancy Moye Football and Lacrosse Complex on the Macon campus. The new facility, adjacent to Hawkins Arena and Mercer's other athletic facilities, has the following components: the Homer and Ruth Drake Field House, the William H. Anderson II Family Field, the Marshall and Jane Butler Family Plaza, and the Tony and Nancy Moye Family Football and Lacrosse Complex. Construction was completed in 2013; the Field Turf surface was completed in July 2012, the Drake Field House opened in November 2012.

Mercer's athletic facilities are located next to Interstate 75. Large parking lots are available for visitors-spectators arriving via the Mercer University Drive exit.

== See also ==
- List of college athletic programs in Georgia (U.S. state)
- List of alumni of Mercer University
- WMUM-FM, Mercer University Radio
