= Sachi Koto =

American journalist

- Born: October 15, 1951 (age 73); Atlanta, Georgia
- Education: Reinhardt College
- Occupation: Journalist
- Known for: President and founder (2005), Who's Who in Asian American Communities

Sachi Koto is a Japanese American journalist. She was a news anchor on CNN News for 16 years, until leaving in 2005 to run her own communications company, Sachi Koto Communications, LLC. Koto worked at various radio and television stations in Atlanta and Tokyo for nine years before joining CNN. While she was with CNN, she reported for CNN Headline News, CNN Radio, CNN Airport Network, CNN International, CNN QuickCast and Turner South.

She graduated, summa cum laude, with a degree in communications from Reinhardt College in Waleska, Georgia, as a presidential scholar. She also has a degree in Japanese language and culture from Gendai Nihongo Gakko in Tokyo.

Koto was appointed as commissioner to the Asian-American Commission for a new Georgia by Governor Sonny Perdue and is a founder of Who's Who in Asian American Communities.

In 2021, Koto received the Order of the Rising Sun, Gold Rays with Rosette in recognition of her "outstanding contribution to promoting exchange and mutual understanding between Japan and the United States".
