= OrthoGeorgia Park =

Baseball stadium in Macon, Georgia, US

OrthoGeorgia Park at Claude Smith Field
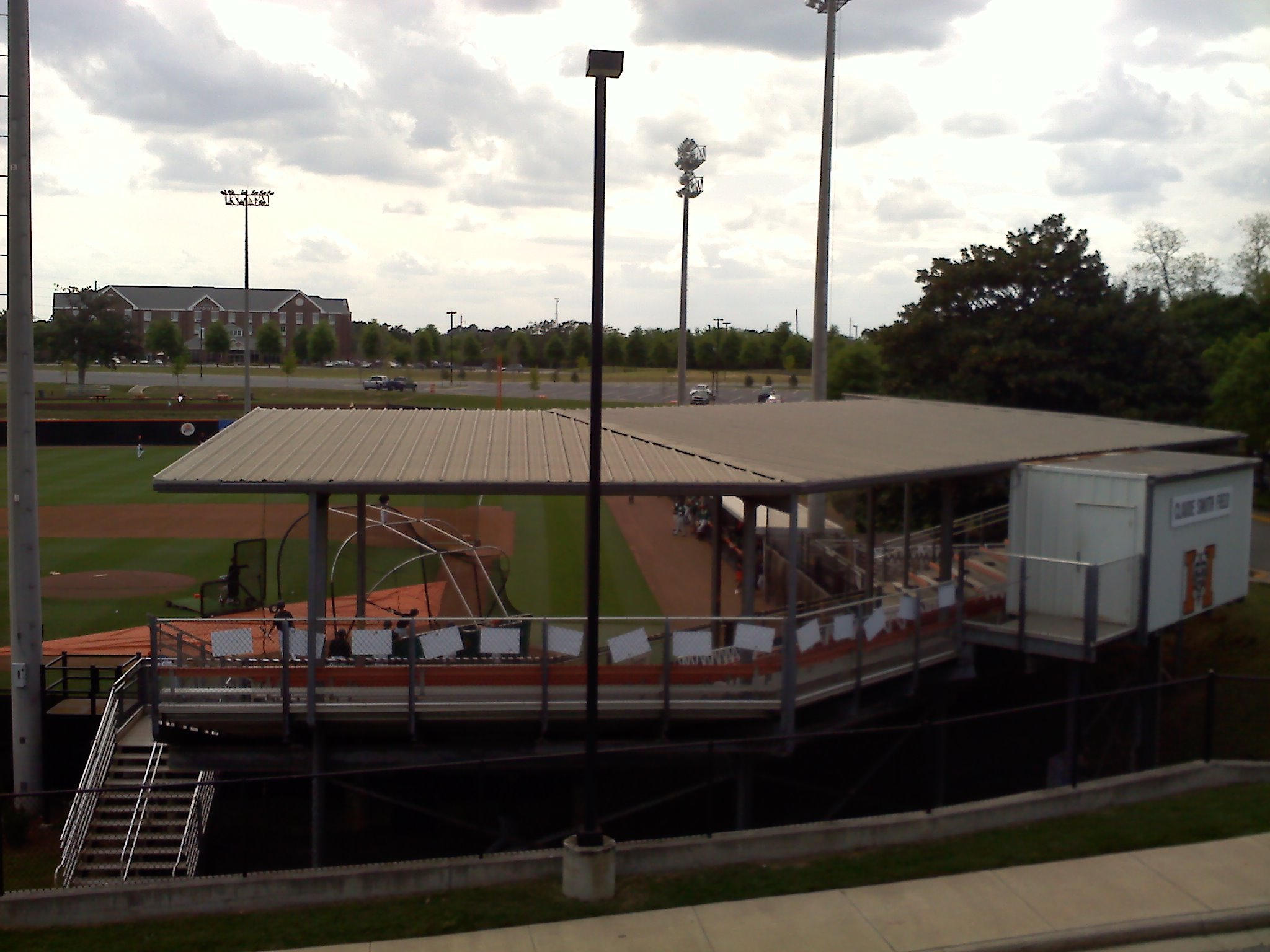
- Interactive map of OrthoGeorgia Park at Claude Smith Field
- Former names: Bear Field (1962–1976); Claude Smith Field (1977–2016)
- Location: Adams Street, Macon, Georgia, US
- Coordinates: 32.828471°N 83.653437°W
- Owner: Mercer University
- Capacity: 1,500
- Surface: Natural grass with artificial turf halo around home plate
- Scoreboard: Electronic
- Field size: Left Field: 330 ft Left Center Field: 370 ft Center Field: 400 ft Right Center Field: 350 ft Right Field: 320 ft

Construction
- Renovated: 2003, 2017

Tenants
- Mercer Bears baseball A-Sun Tournament (1994)

OrthoGeorgia Park at Claude Smith Field is a 1,500-seat baseball stadium on the campus of Mercer University in Macon, Georgia, United States. The facility has a press box, concession stands, and additional berm seating along the right field fence. On November 11, 2014, Mercer announced plans to renovate and expand the stadium, which will include new seating areas, concession areas, press box, dugouts, and a new entrance plaza. Significant funding will be provided by OrthoGeorgia in return for future naming rights.

The facility is named for Claude Smith, Mercer baseball coach from 1948 to 1977. The field was named for him upon his retirement in 1977; Smith won 405 games as Mercer's coach and is the winningest coach in university history.

The field is located adjacent to Mercer's other athletic facilities including the University Center (basketball arena and athletic department offices), Moye Complex (football and lacrosse), and Sikes Field (softball). There is a 101-room Hilton Garden Inn on university-owned land adjacent to the field. Large parking lots are available for visitors-spectators arriving via the Mercer University Drive exit off of Interstate 75.

== See also ==
- List of NCAA Division I baseball venues
- Mercer Bears
- Moye Complex
- University Center
