= Frank Gordy =

Walter Frank Gordy (born 9 February 1904, Thomaston, Upson County, Georgia, USA; died 18 June 1983) was the founder of The Varsity chain of restaurants, which includes the world's largest drive-in restaurant on North Avenue near Georgia Tech in Atlanta, GA.

Gordy graduated from Reinhardt University before beginning his studies at Georgia Tech. He dropped out of Georgia Tech in 1925 to start his restaurant chain, which opened in April 1928.

Gordy married Evelyn Jackson on June 7, 1930. In 1940, they moved into their home at 3558 Piedmont Road where they lived until Mr. Gordy's death from emphysema in 1983.

He is buried in Westview Cemetery in SW Atlanta, Georgia, USA.
