= Funk Heritage Center =

Coordinates: 34.3211°N 84.5497°W

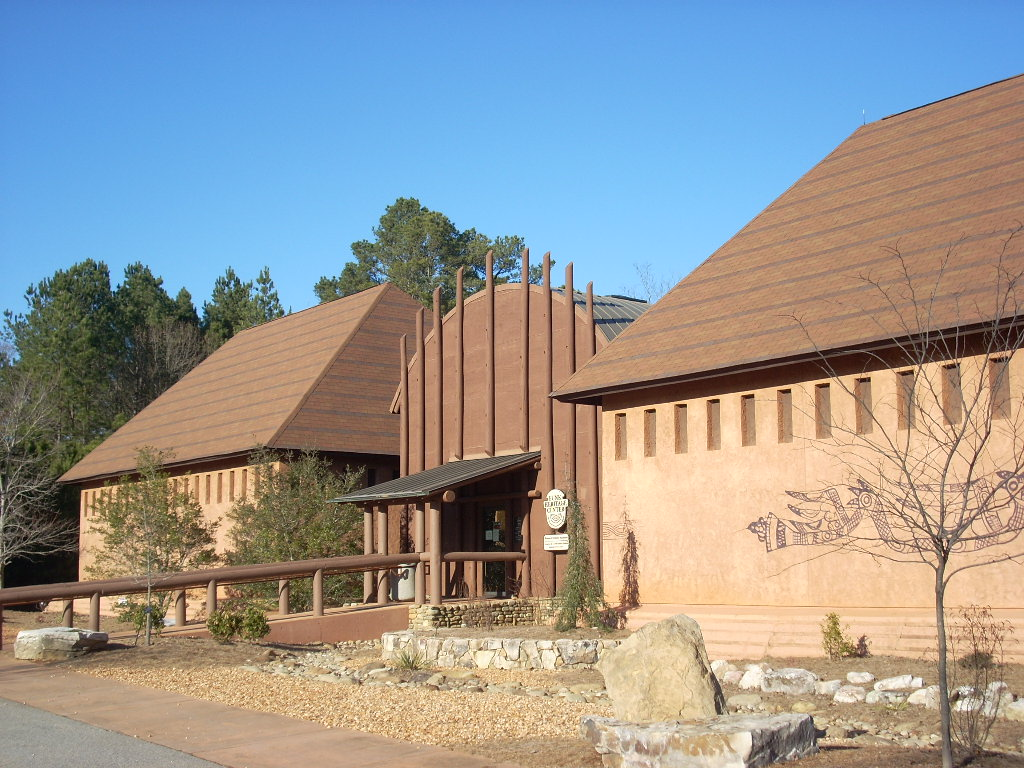
Funk Heritage Center, 2010

The Funk Heritage Center in Waleska, Georgia, is Georgia's official frontier and southeastern Indian interpretive center. Located on the campus of Reinhardt University, the center houses a gallery of Native American artifacts and artwork, as well as a theater, which features a short film on the history of Native Americans in the southeastern United States. A small souvenir shop is also available.

A 2003 statute named the center as Georgia's official Frontier and Southeastern Indian Interpretive Center.

== See also ==
- Sequoyah
- New Echota
- Etowah Indian Mounds
