= The Varsity (restaurant) =

Fast-food restaurant in Atlanta, Georgia, U.S.

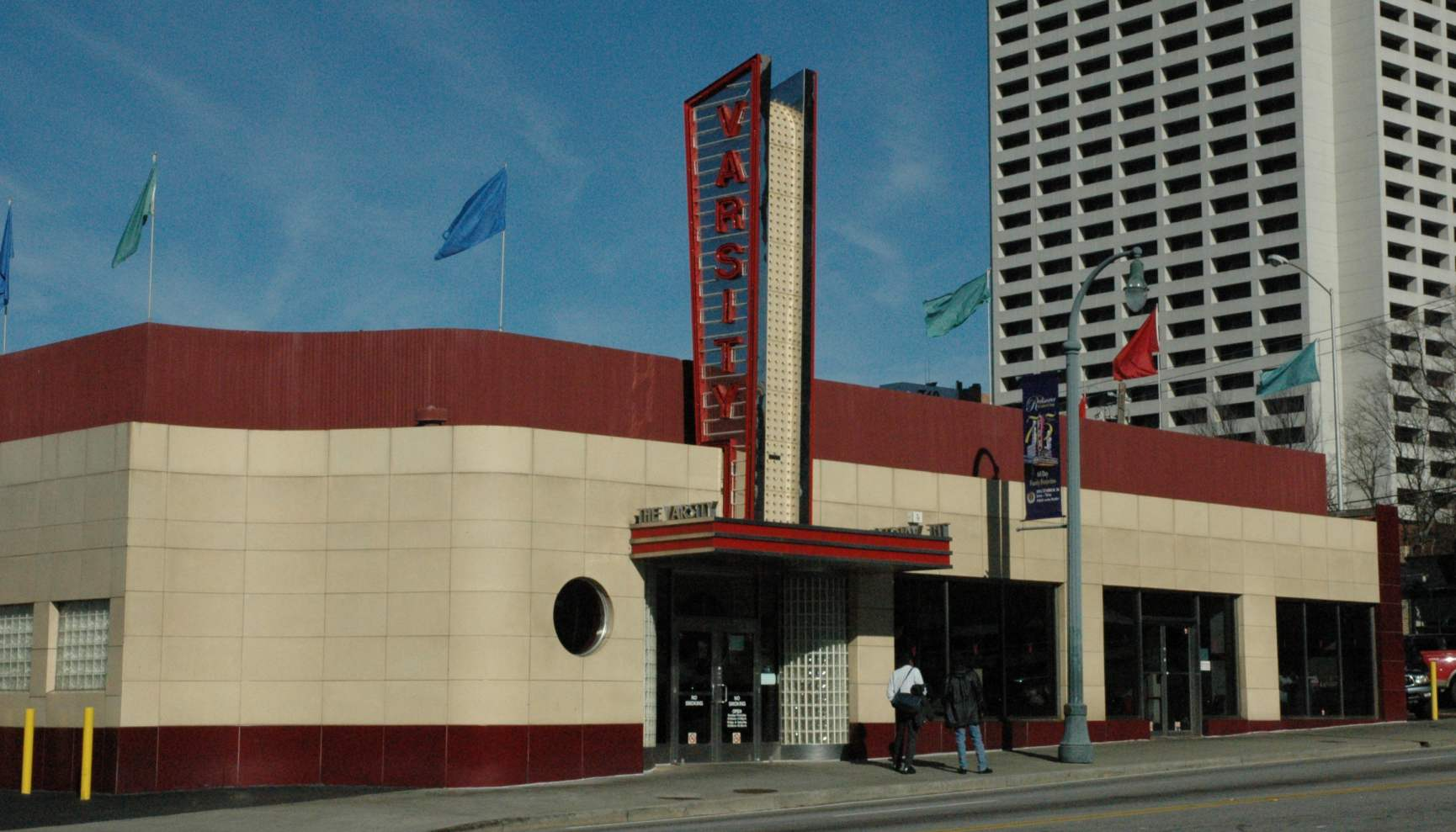
- The front exterior of The Varsity
- Interactive map of The Varsity

Restaurant information
- Established: 1928
- Food type: Fast food
- Location: 61 North Avenue NW (original), Atlanta, Georgia, 30308, United States
- Seating capacity: 800+ inside and 600 cars (Downtown location)
- Other locations: Norcross, Kennesaw, Dawsonville, Bethlehem, Cartersville, Rome, Watkinsville — all in Georgia
- Website: Official website

The Varsity is a restaurant chain in Atlanta, Georgia. The main branch of the chain was the largest drive-in fast food restaurant in the world, taking up two city blocks and accommodating up to 800 diners. The main location ended car-side service in 2020. There are now seven other branches across metropolitan Atlanta.

== History ==
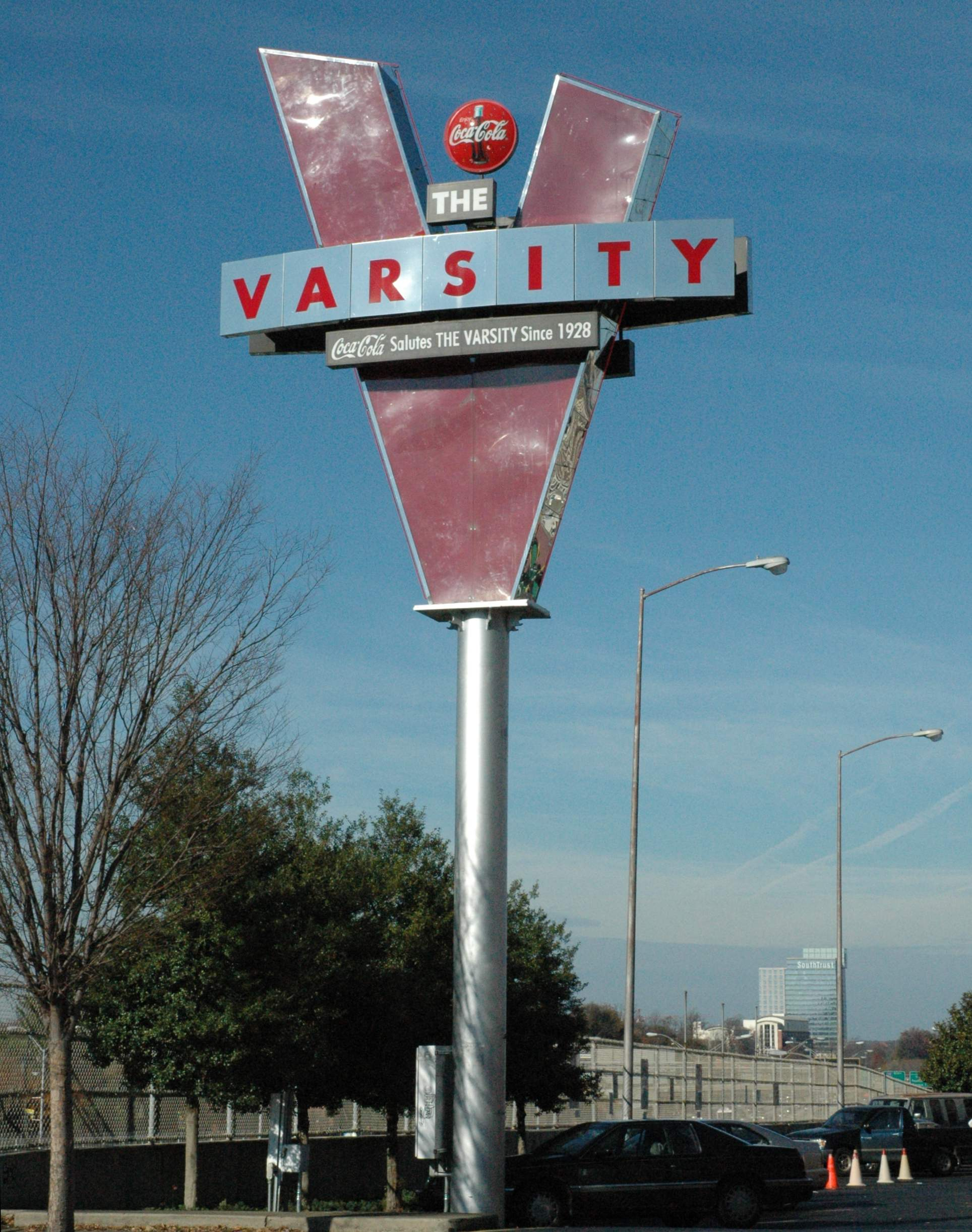
The famous Varsity 'V' sign as seen from the Downtown Connector

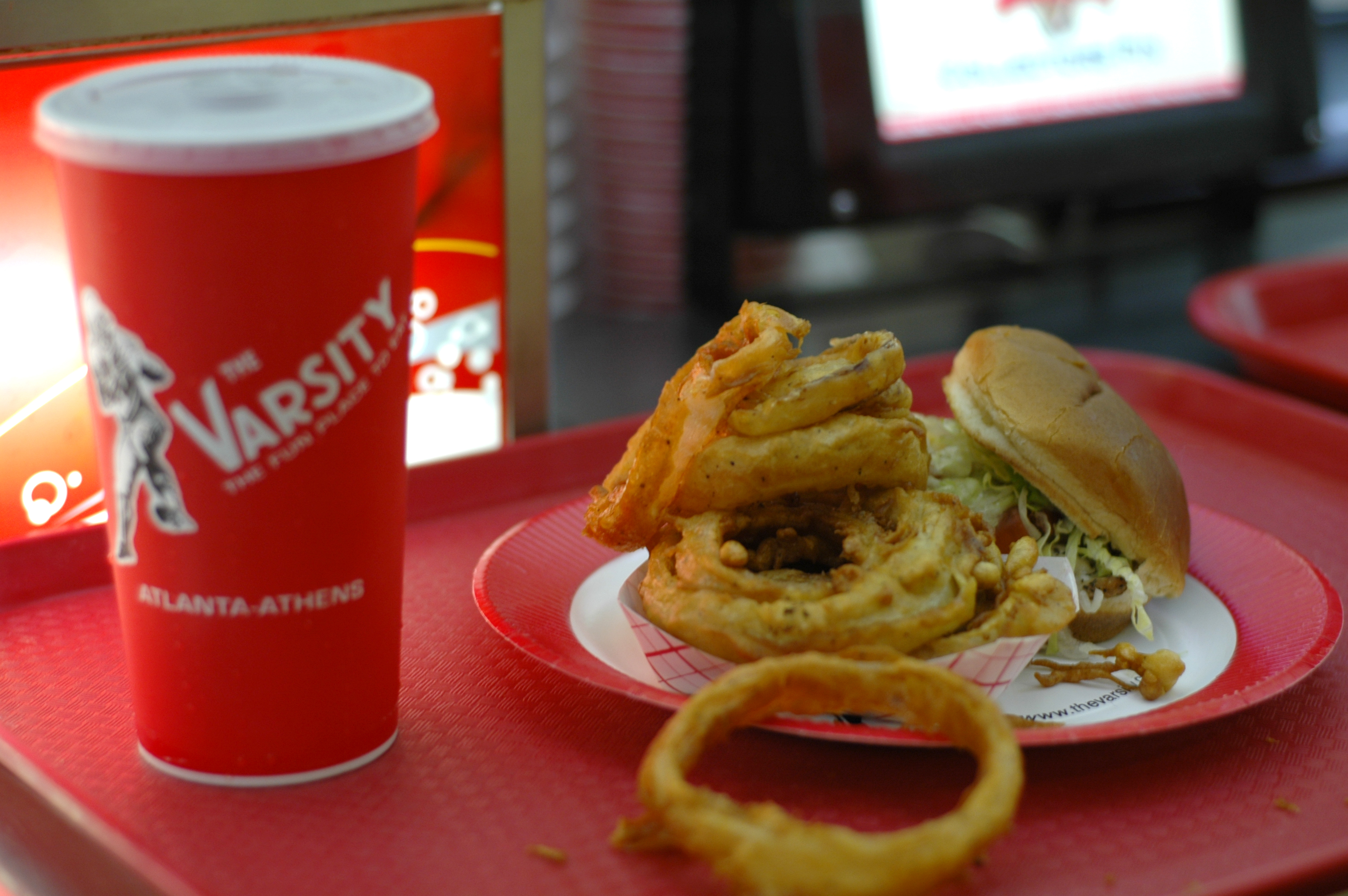
A meal at The Varsity

Originally named "The Yellow Jacket", The Varsity was established in 1928 at the corner of Luckie Street and Hemphill Avenue in Midtown Atlanta. Its founder, Frank Gordy of Thomaston, Georgia, a Reinhardt University graduate, briefly attended The Georgia Institute of Technology (Georgia Tech), studying industrial management. Popular legend states that Gordy dropped out, but according to Janice McDonald, he actually transferred to Oglethorpe College. As the business grew, Gordy was forced to move the restaurant to 61 North Avenue (on the northwest corner of Spring Street). To accommodate the crowds, the present structure now covers two city blocks. It was here that the name was changed to "The Varsity," reflecting his desire to expand to other college campuses. During the drive-in era, The Varsity began its curbside service. The Atlanta location ceased offering curbside service in July 2020 but later reintroduced it in September of that year, in modified form.

The current location in Atlanta is now adjacent to the Downtown Connector's interchange with North Avenue. When that freeway (now I-75/85) was built by GDOT, it took out several blocks of Williams Street and much of The Varsity's western parking lot, forcing a parking garage to be erected as a replacement. The restaurant and the Georgia Tech campus sit on opposite sides of the Connector, linked by the North Avenue bridge.

The enterprise has since expanded all around the state of Georgia. Outside of Atlanta, current locations can be found in Norcross, Kennesaw, Dawsonville, Bethlehem, Cartersville, Rome, and Watkinsville. Former Varsity locations include the cities of Athens and Alpharetta. The first Athens location opened in 1932 at the corner of East Broad Street and College Avenue but was closed around the late 1970s. Another Athens location opened further west on West Broad Street near Milledge Avenue in the 1960s. The latter location is scheduled for demolition in 2021. The Varsity location in Athens closed in June 2021, though the company hinted that it might return to Athens. The Alpharetta location closed on February 1, 2016, as it had become unprofitable, and the building has since been demolished. In 2023, a new Varsity opened in Bethlehem. During that same year, construction for a location in Rome began. Although it was supposed to be open by the end of the year, the Rome location opened in Spring 2024.

The Varsity, Jr., located in northeast Atlanta, was the only other location of the chain to offer curbside service. The Varsity, Jr. closed in August 2010, having been at that location for more than 40 years, after the city of Atlanta did not approve the chain's plans to replace that building. The plans for the new Varsity, Jr. were instead used for the new location in Dawsonville. The restaurant offers catering services to the metro Atlanta region for both corporate and non-corporate functions, going as far east as Conyers and Stone Mountain, Georgia.

Frank Gordy met his wife, Evelyn, at Reinhardt in 1924 and went on to Georgia Tech to finish his education. Their custom-designed home was later moved from Atlanta to the Reinhardt University campus. The Gordy family gave part of their land to Cobb County for what is now the Mountain View campus of Chattahoochee Technical College and the Mountain View Aquatics Center, the rest was sold in the 1990s for upscale tract housing and strip malls. Gordy Parkway, a loop named for Frank Gordy, serves all of these.

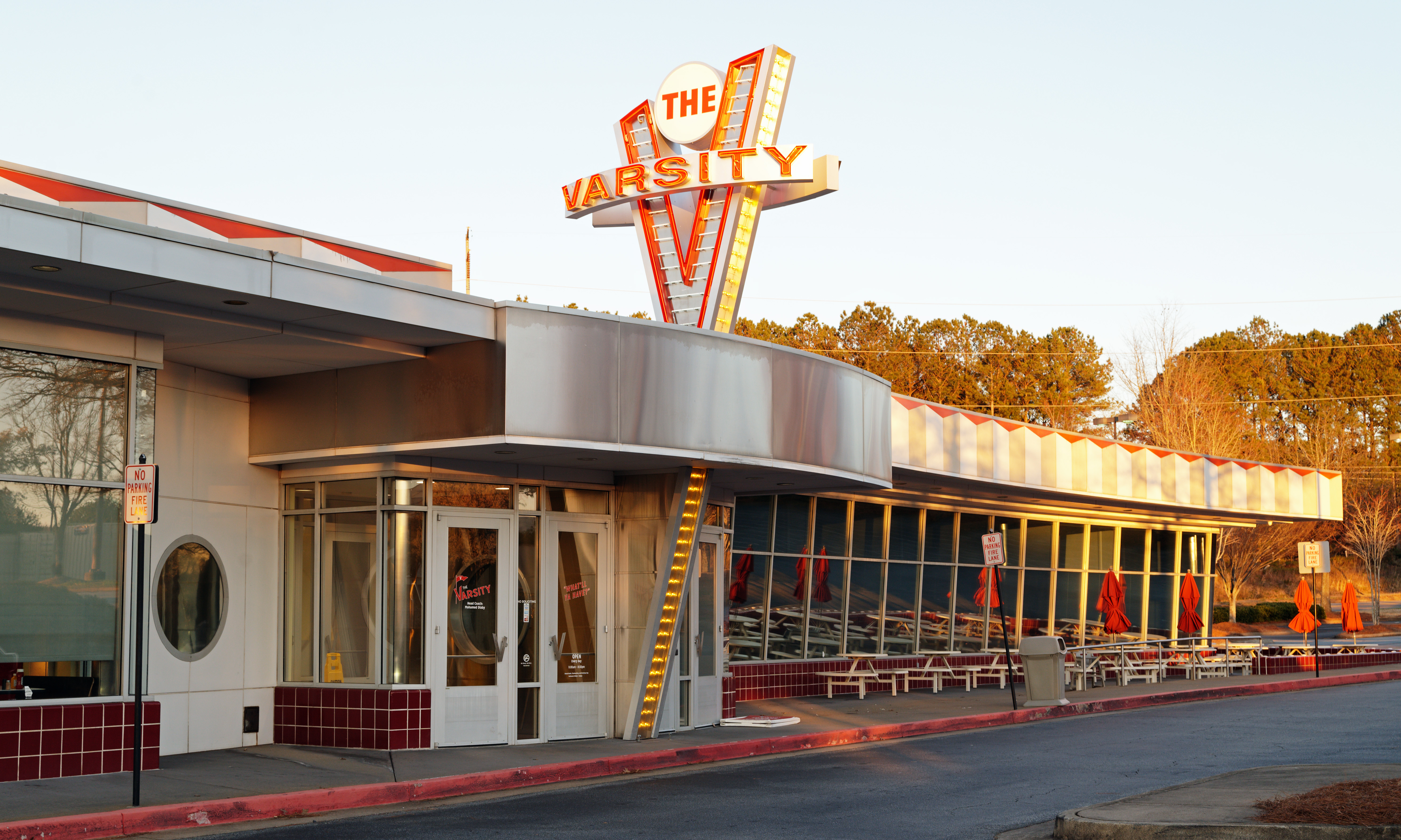
The Varsity in Kennesaw, Georgia

=== Culture ===
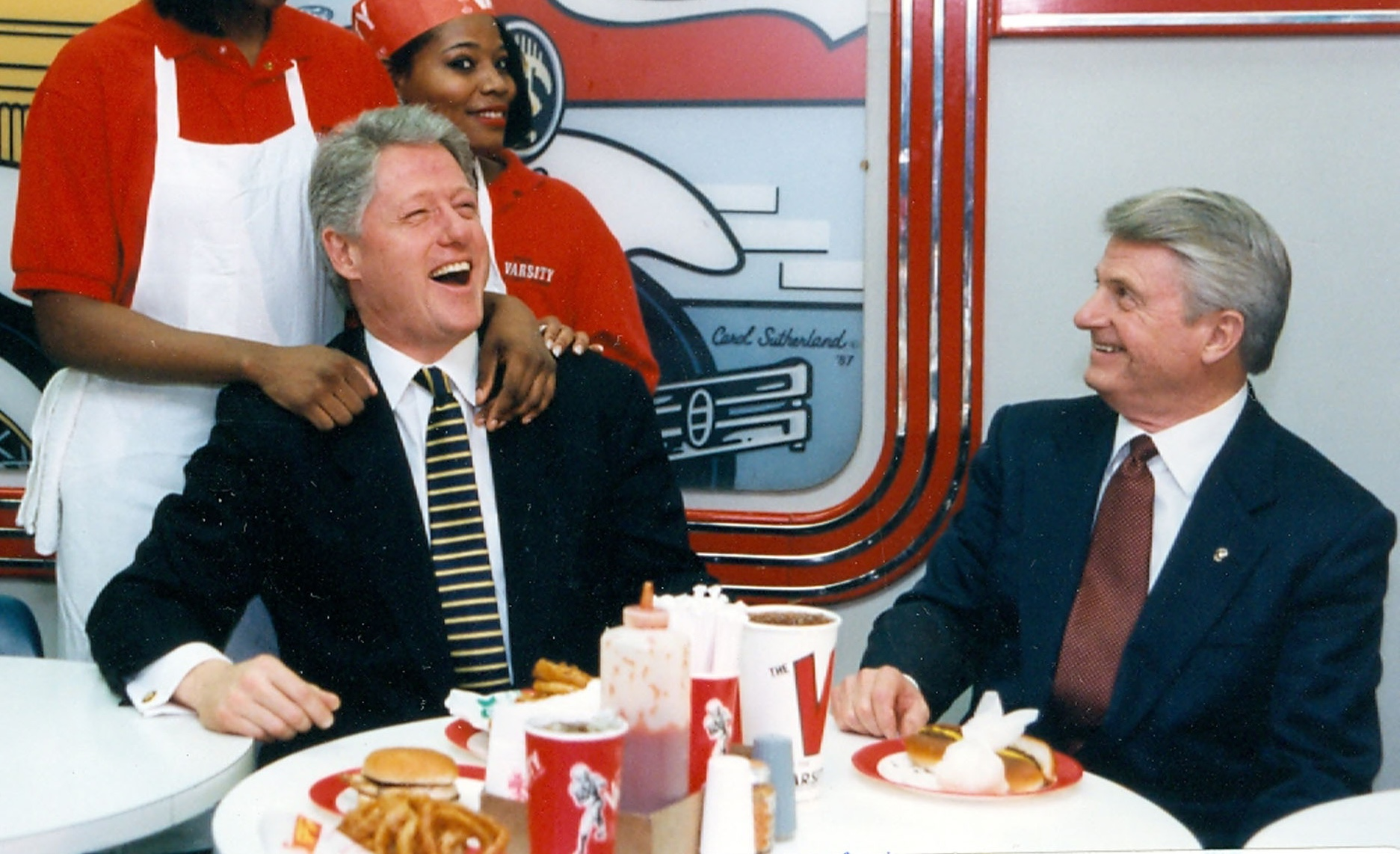
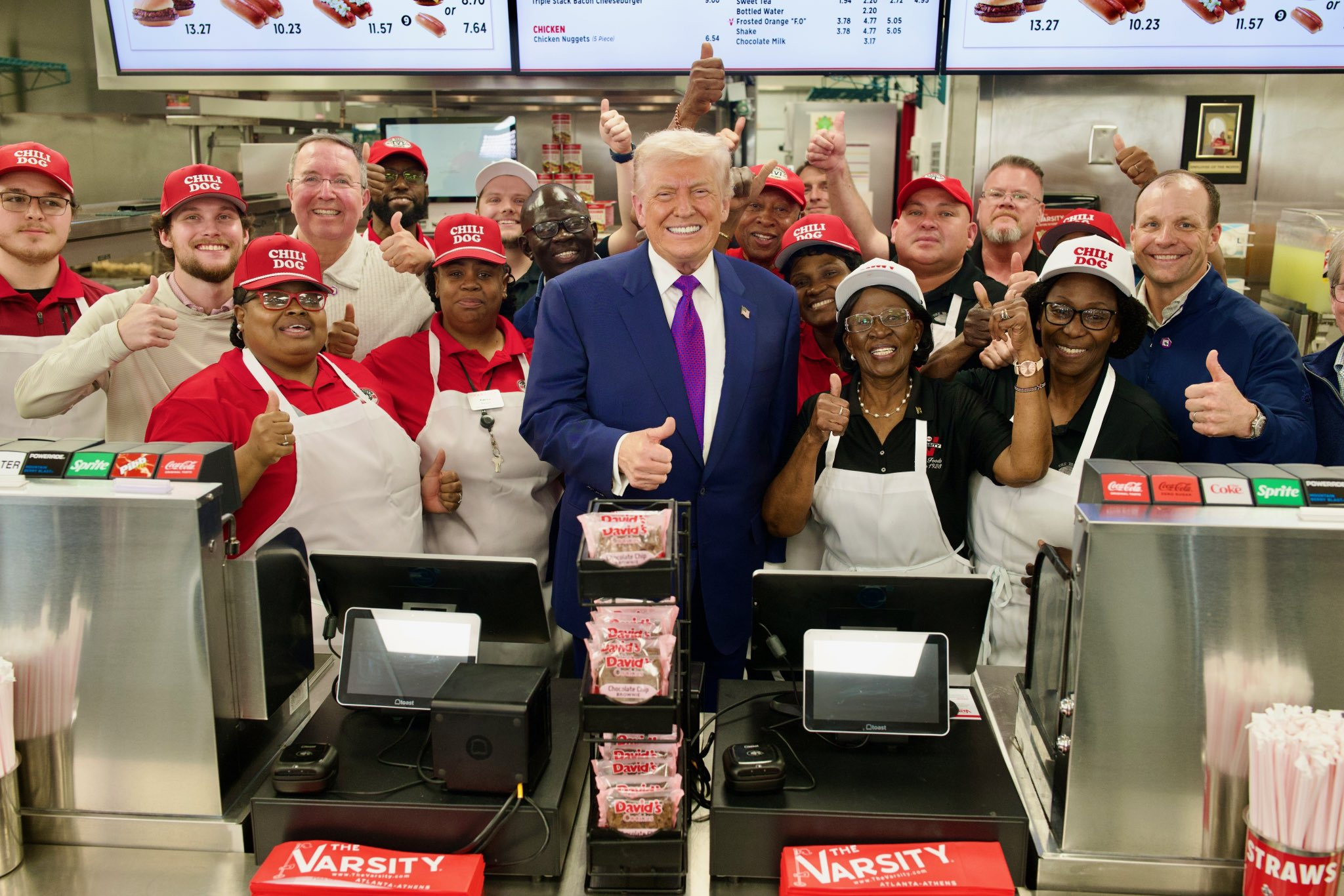
The restaurant chain has been visited by multiple U.S. presidents, including Bill Clinton (pictured in 1996) and Donald Trump (pictured in 2026).

One of the best-known employees at the Varsity was Erby Walker, who worked there for 45 years until he died in 2008. He started at the Varsity at the age of 15 sweeping floors, and was nearly fired on the first day, but soon graduated to the kitchen. Mr. Walker was noted for his ability to move the service line quickly, especially during the rush period right before a Georgia Tech football game. His signature catchphrase was, "Have your money out and your food on your mind, and I'll getcha to the game on time!" He retired in 2003, but came back three weeks later. That year Walker was inducted into the Atlanta Convention and Visitors Bureau Hospitality Hall of Fame.

Comedian Nipsey Russell began his entertainment career at The Varsity in the 1940s as a carhop. The creative and resourceful Russell would dress in a flamboyant style and pepper his order-taking duties with jokes and amusing songs, thereby earning him extra tips. U.S. presidents Jimmy Carter, George H. W. Bush, Bill Clinton, Barack Obama, and Donald Trump all visited The Varsity during their terms in office. Mad artist Jack Davis has done advertising for The Varsity.

The Varsity was featured in the PBS documentary A Hot Dog Program by Rick Sebak. It also appeared in the movie We Are Marshall while the coaches are recruiting players.

The Varsity's likeness appeared as "The Carcity" in the video game "Midnight Club 3:DUB Edition" by Rockstar Games in its version of Atlanta. One of the game's noticeable differences is using an upside-down "V" as the logo for the building.

=== Service ===
The Varsity bills itself as "The World’s Largest Drive-in Restaurant." According to the Atlanta History Center, The Varsity receives over 30,000 people on days when a football game is playing. The restaurant receives several more visitors during Supercross Saturday and on Saturdays in July in general.

In 1996, The Varsity stated that it served over 5,000 fried fruit pies, two miles of hotdogs, 300 gallons of chili, 2,500 pounds of potatoes and 2,000 pounds of onions every day. It also described itself as the largest seller of Coca-Cola in the world. In 1998, The Baltimore Sun reported that the restaurant sold over 12,000 hotdogs a day and could deliver over 1,000 hotdogs a minute via conveyor belt. In August 2018, Garden & Gun reported that the restaurant could manufacture up to 2,400 fried fruit pies an hour.

== See also ==
- Junior's Grill - a diner located at Georgia Tech; closed in 2011.

== Books ==
- What'll Ya Have: A History of the Varsity. Dick Parker. Looking Glass Books, 2003. ISBN 978-1-929619-18-4
- Images of America: The Varsity. Janice McDonald. Arcadia Publishing, 2011. ISBN 978-0-7385-8797-4
