= Reinhardt University =

Private university in Waleska, Georgia, US

- Former names: Reinhardt Academy (1883–1891); Reinhardt Normal College (1891–1911); Reinhardt Junior College (1920–1994); Reinhardt College (1911–1920; 1994–2010)
- Type: Private university
- Established: 1883; 143 years ago
- Religious affiliation: United Methodist Church
- Endowment: $40.1 million
- President: Mark A. Roberts
- Faculty: 80
- Undergraduates: 1,281
- Location: Waleska, Georgia, United States; 34.319°N 84.553°W
- Campus: Rural, 540 acres (220 ha), 90 acres (36 ha) developed
- Colors: Navy & Gold
- Nickname: Eagles
- Sporting affiliations: NAIA – Appalachian
- Mascots: SOAR, the Eagle
- Website: reinhardt.edu
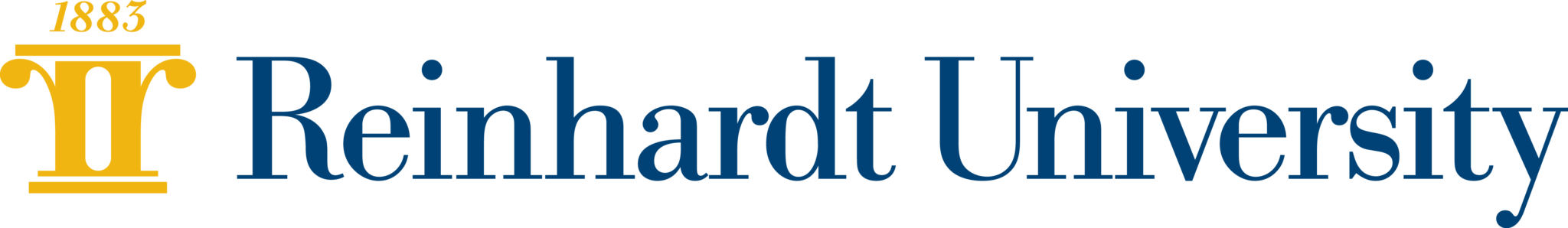

Reinhardt University is a private university with its main campus in Waleska, Georgia, United States, and its Cauble School of Nursing and Health Sciences in Jasper. Over 50 graduate and undergraduate programs are offered on campus and online. Reinhardt is affiliated with the United Methodist Church. The 620-acre campus includes hiking trails, disc golf, professional concerts at the Falany Performing Arts Center, athletic teams, and the Funk Heritage Center and Bennett History Museum.

== History ==
=== Founding ===
In 1883, former Confederate Army Captain and Atlanta lawyer Augustus M. Reinhardt and his brother-in-law, former Lieutenant-Colonel John J. A. Sharp, commenced plans to open a school in Waleska. Both Reinhardt and Sharp had grown up in the Waleska area, and after the American Civil War had ended and the hardships of Reconstruction begun, both men wanted to provide a school for the local citizens of impoverished Cherokee County.

Reinhardt, who had been a successful lawyer after the Civil War with the firm of Reinhardt & Hook in Atlanta and owned interest in a successful Atlanta street car line, went to the North Georgia conference of the Methodist Church and appealed for them to provide a strong minister and teacher to start the school. In return, he promised to offer this individual a yearly salary of $1,000. Sharp, who had owned a store, cotton gin, and tobacco factory in the Waleska area before the Civil War, had retained some of his money after the war and was still active in the local area. Upon deciding to start the school with Reinhardt, he purchased a local sawmill and hired men in preparation to start construction on school buildings.

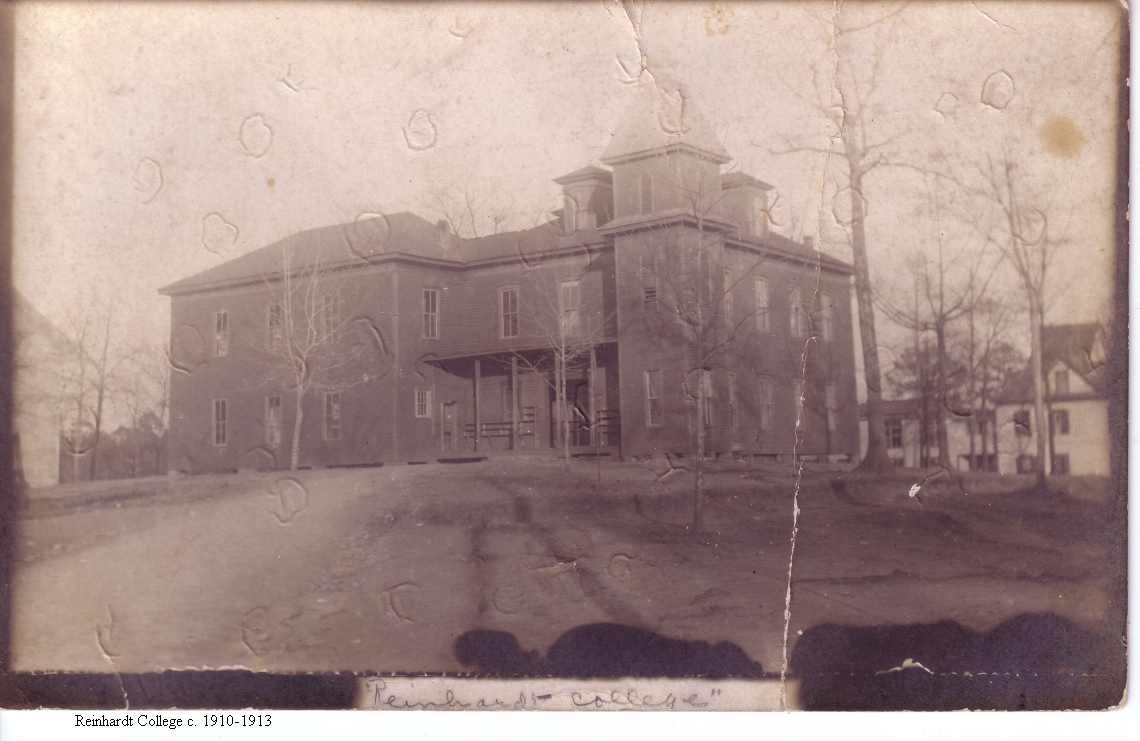
1885 Reinhardt Academy Administration Building

In 1884, with the Methodist Conference answering Reinhardt's request by sending Emory College graduate James T. Linn as the school's first teacher, Reinhardt Academy opened for classes in an old cabinet and wood shop located at the southern edge of Waleska. The school had been named in honor of Reinhardt's father, Lewis W. Reinhardt, who had settled in the area in 1833 and had established a local church known as Reinhardt Chapel.

Just a month after the school opened, a tornado struck Waleska, damaging a lot of property and injuring several people. The school, however, wasn't harmed and classes continued uninterrupted. The tornado left downed pine trees perfect for building. Seizing this ready supply of wood, school officials and local citizens had it cut up into lumber and began to construct Reinhardt's first permanent building. In January 1885, students moved out of the old cabinet and wood shop and into the school's newly completed, three-story framed building, which was capable of housing 11 classes of students. The school now had an official residence in the town.

Over the next century, many buildings were built and land acquired, expanding the campus's physical presence to a 90-acre (360,000 m^{2}) building site and overall 540-acre (2.2 km^{2}) college campus. Fire and or demolition over the years have left no trace of any of the original 19th-century buildings.

=== Growth ===
Reinhardt Academy opened in 1884 as a grammar school and academy (high school) for students of all ages. The founders had originally wanted the school to be just a college, but at the time there were no students of college age in the area.

The grammar school taught reading, writing and arithmetic, supplemented by courses in elocution, geography, history and penmanship. The academy (high school) taught students algebra, astronomy, botany, chemistry, ethics, geology, geometry, grammar, languages (French, Greek and Latin), literature, logic, music, physics, psychology, and, by 1916, art and expression. In 1888, the school had its first graduating high school class of four students.

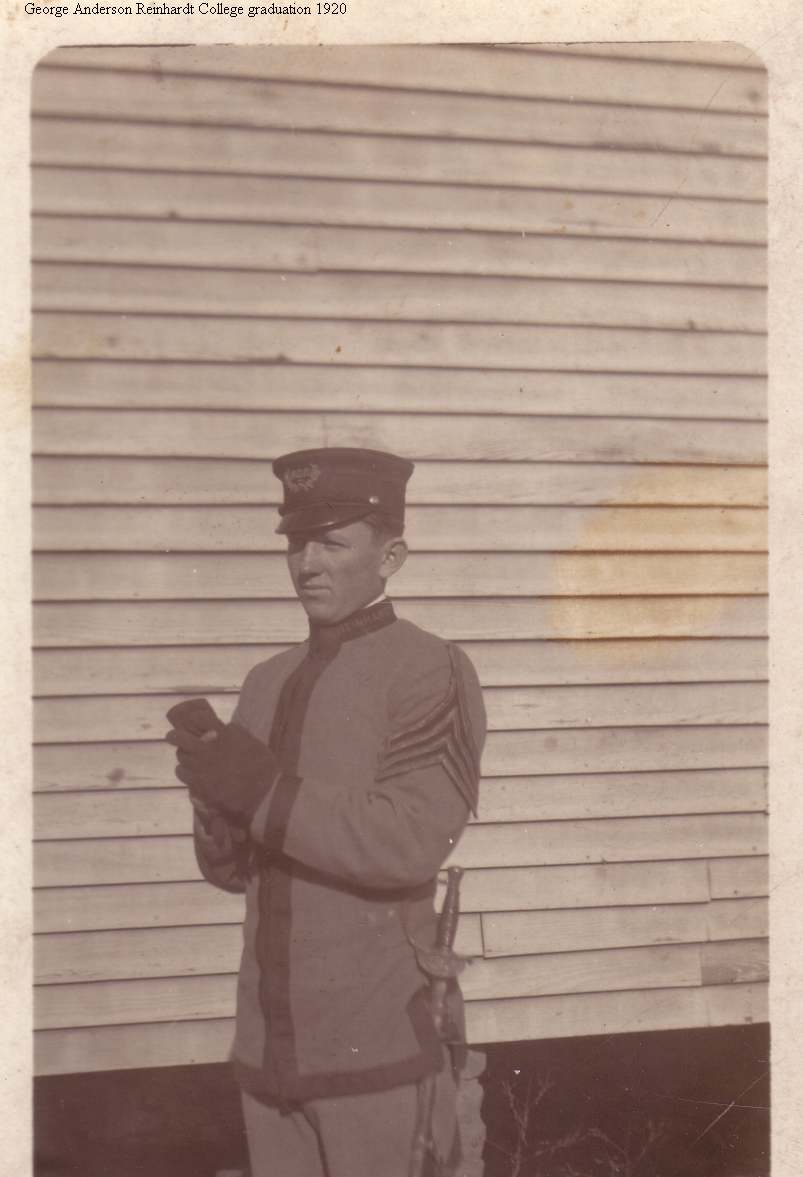
Early Reinhardt military cadet

In 1893, a military department was established in lieu of a physical education department at the school. Service in this department was compulsory for able-bodied boys, where they often participated in drills, exercises, encampments, dress parades, and mock skirmishes. In 1905, the military department suggested, but didn't make mandatory, that the school's boys should wear uniforms. For girls, however, it was decided that they had to wear "blue skirts, white waists and Oxford (mortar-board with tassels) caps." The military department was replaced by the Department of Physical Culture in 1922.

By the last decade of the 19th century, the school was educating students who wanted to go on to be teachers in the art of pedagogy. At this time in American history, schools that offered this type of training were known as normal schools. Therefore, in 1890, Reinhardt Academy was incorporated as Reinhardt Normal College and operated under this name until 1911 when "Normal" was dropped and the school became, simply, Reinhardt College.

In 1920, Reinhardt became an official junior college, when it added a second year of postsecondary education to its curriculum. The school had its first graduating college class in 1921.

By 1925, the control of Reinhardt's grammar school was transferred to the Cherokee County school system; however, the school remained on Reinhardt's campus until 1948, when R.M. Moore Elementary School opened in Waleska. In 1956, Reinhardt's academy, then known as Reinhardt High School, closed when its students were transferred to Cherokee High School in Canton, Georgia.

In 1957, Reinhardt College began classes with only college-age students on its campus for the first time in its history. It admitted its first Black student in 1966 when James T. "Jay" Jordan from nearby Canton, Georgia, started classes.

In June 2010, Reinhardt College became Reinhardt University.

== Campus ==
The Burgess Administration Building - opened in 1951 and designed by architect William J. J. Chase - is one of Reinhardt's most recognized buildings. The Hill Freeman Library and Spruill Learning Center holds some 131,000 books, periodicals and audiovisual materials. Other buildings at Reinhardt include the Falany Performing Arts Center, which houses the university's music and communication programs and performance space, the Fincher Visual Arts Center, and the Brown Athletic Center.

Students reside in nine residence halls and two apartment-style buildings. The Hasty Student Life Center opened in May 2007 and houses the bookstore, Starbucks, student activities, residence life, counseling, career services, campus ministry, and student affairs.

The campus is also home to the Funk Heritage Center, Georgia's Official Frontier and Southeastern Indian Interpretive Center. The Center features contemporary Native American art, exhibits on Native American culture, an extensive collection of hand tools, and a recreated Appalachian settlement village.

=== Early campus history ===
When Reinhardt Academy opened in January 1884, students convened in an old cabinet and wood shop located at the southern edge of Waleska. This original one-room frame structure had a huge fireplace at one end to keep the 30 or 40 original students warm as they sat on benches made of split logs supported by pine legs.

In 1885, the school moved into its first permanent building, a large, three-story frame structure that cost $2,500 to build. This structure, which could house 11 classes of students, contained five recitation rooms, two offices, storage space and, eventually, a laboratory, a library, an armory (for Reinhardt's Military Department) and a music room.

In 1892, Reinhardt built a 1,200-seat, wood chapel near the administration building. The back of this building housed the Primary Department and provided rooms for music education.

As with many buildings in Reinhardt's history (see Residential history), fire destroyed both the three-story classroom-administration building and chapel in 1911. As a result, a campaign was begun to garner funds to build a larger, better administration building. Mary Reinhardt Sharp, school co-founder J. A. Sharp's widow, donated her 17-acre (69,000 m^{2}) home place for the new building and funds were secured.

In 1912, the cornerstone was laid for the new administration building to be named Mary Stuart Witham Hall in honor of board of trustees' member William S. Witham's mother. Witham had also chaired the building committee to raise the funds for this new structure. This new, wooden building had a stucco exterior and a beaver-board interior, and contained recitation rooms, offices, a library and music room, classrooms, a laundry room and an auditorium, which also doubled as the school chapel and community church. In 1912, this became the school's first building with indoor plumbing and in 1916 the first building on campus to be electrically lighted. This building was later torn down in 1950 to make way for the still-standing Burgess Administration Building.

In 1926, Reinhardt built its first non-wooden structure, the Dobbs Hall classroom building, named after Dr. Samuel Candler Dobbs, who donated $85,000 for construction of the building. Dobbs was an employee of Coca-Cola business tycoon Asa Griggs Candler's. Dobbs had served as Coca-Cola's first salesman and eventually became the advertising manager and president of the company. This building, originally designed by Atlanta architect T. J. Mitchell, was renovated and added onto in 1997. It now serves as the John Franklin Science Center.

Dobbs also gave money, along with the people of Canton, in 1931 to build the school's first gymnasium. In later years, this gym was converted into a student center, complete with administration offices, campus security offices, a book store and coffee house. It was torn down in 2004 to make way for the new Hasty Student Life Center.

In 1949, Reinhardt College hosted a Conservation Field Day, billed as a "one-day Master Soil Conservation 'Face-lifting Demonstration'", where the college added fifty acres of land to its property, built four buildings for various uses, constructed a one-acre fish pond and ten-acre athletic field, and put up five miles of fences. The highlight of the day was a speech given to 50,000 people by U.S. Vice President Alben W. Barkley.

Throughout the 1940s and 50s many other buildings were built on campus – faculty houses, faculty apartments, a president's home (replaced in 1977 by the current president's home), a parsonage for the church, a farm and multiple out buildings. Multiple dormitories also were built throughout the last part of the 19th century and first part of the 20th century (see Residential history).

=== Evelyn Gordy Hospitality House ===
Although the Evelyn Gordy Hospitality House wasn't moved to the Reinhardt campus until the early 1990s, it was built in 1929 and was originally located at 3558 Piedmont Avenue in the Buckhead neighborhood of Atlanta. The home's former address is now The Manor at Buckhead, a private-gated community.

Before her death in 2006, Evelyn Gordy Rankin was a loyal alumna, Board of Trustees member and benefactor to the college. Rankin's first husband was Frank Gordy, who also was a Reinhardt alumnus and founder of the world's largest drive-in restaurant, The Varsity. Evelyn and Frank met at Reinhardt while students in the 1920s and were married in 1930. In 1940, Frank gave this home to Evelyn as a Christmas present.

Moved to Reinhardt in December 1990 and January 1991 in four pieces, and reassembled, the 3,500 square foot, three-bedroom home underwent an 11-month restoration. In addition to the home's Georgian Revival, Neo-Colonial-inspired architecture, it is sheltered by an Italian-tiled roof and contains rare French, hand blocked-wallpaper in the "Eldorado" pattern made by the Zuber Cie company. This wall paper was painstakingly and meticulously restored by Atlanta artist Prudence Carter.

The home now serves as a meeting place for special functions and groups at the university.

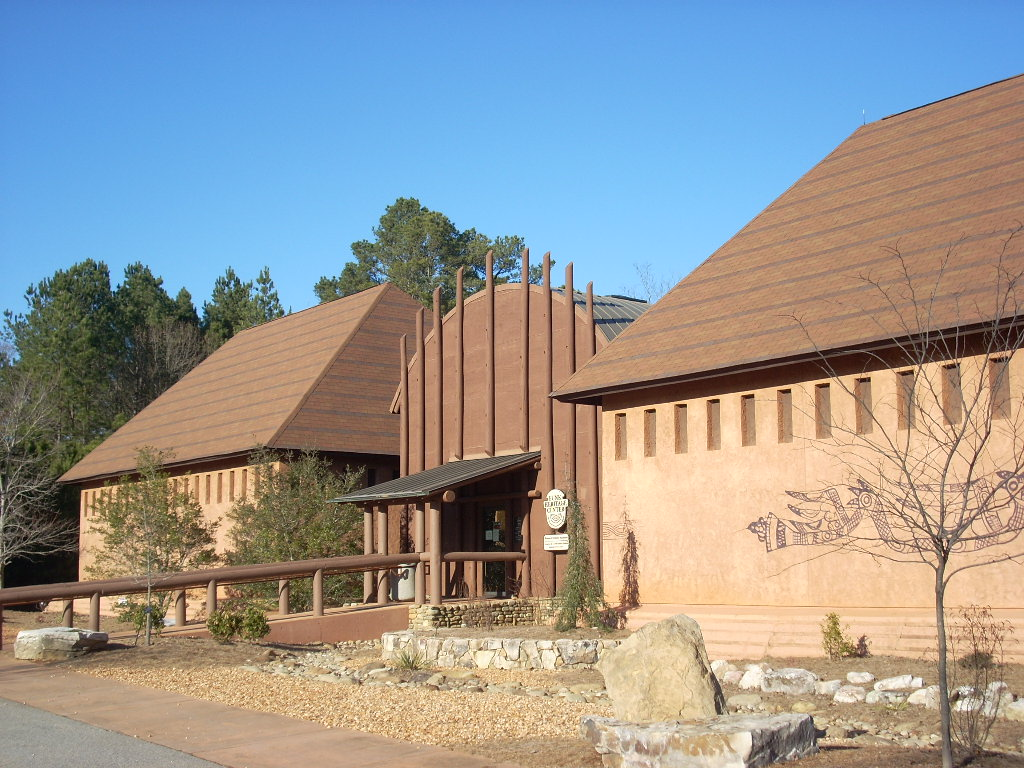
Funk Heritage Center/Bennett History Museum

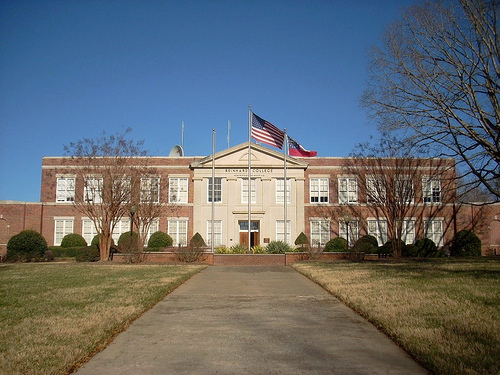
Burgess Administration Building

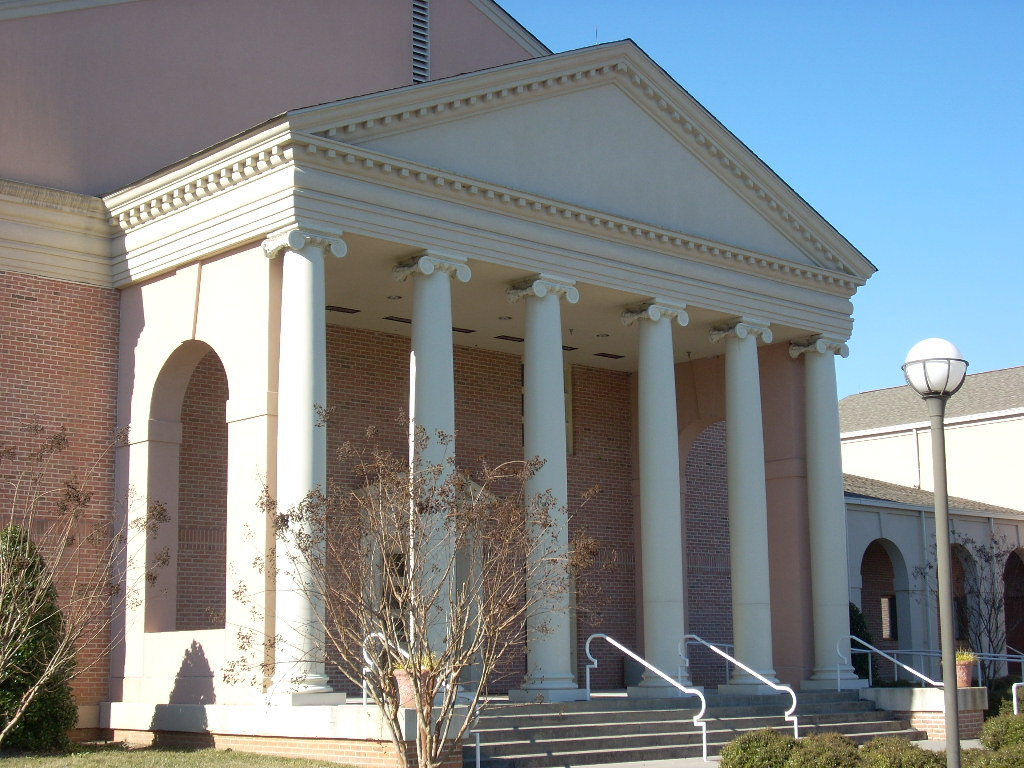
Floyd A. & Fay W. Falany Performing Arts Center

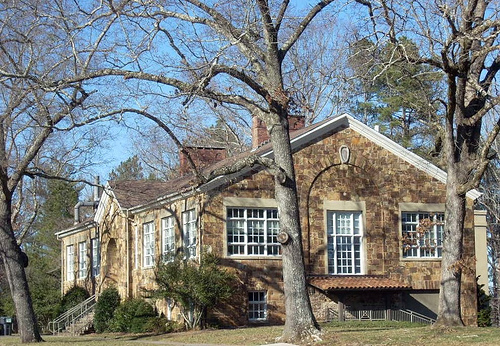
Samuel C. Dobbs Building

Evelyn Gordy Hospitality House

== Student life ==
The Student Activities Council (SAC) plans activities, such as dances, service projects, coffee houses and movie nights. Recognized student groups include those devoted to service, leadership, the arts and music, the outdoors, spiritual growth, and specific academic disciplines. Examples of current recognized student groups include Tri Beta, Phi Alpha Theta, and Alpha Psi Omega. Reinhardt has chapters of Zeta Tau Alpha and Delta Phi Epsilon (social) women's sororities, and Kappa Sigma fraternity, but no Greek housing on campus. Reinhardt also offers Intramural Sports, which is offered to all students, faculty, and staff. Sports include bubble soccer, flag football, dodgeball, and ultimate frisbee.

=== Early student life ===
When Reinhardt was established in the early 1880s, life was governed by the strict social rules and customs of the Victorian era. Additionally, since the school was affiliated with the Methodist Church and was a coeducational institution, it was ultraconservative. It was believed that school teachers and administrators took the place of student's absent parents.

As a religious institution, all students at Reinhardt were required to attend preaching service twice on Sabbath, as well as Sabbath (Sunday) school. Additionally, students had to attend daily morning and evening prayers in the school's chapel and provide themselves with a personal Bible.

Reinhardt operated from the hours of 8:30 a.m. to 4:30 p.m. During this time, students were forbidden to visit each other in their rooms. Strict study hours were prescribed from 7 p.m. to 9 p.m. for students, and they were forbidden to be out of their residences or boarding houses after dark, except to attend literary societies or religious exercises. In addition, male students and female students were forbidden to visit each other in their dorms.

By 1893, the school was using its recently established Military Department, which elected an "officer of the day," to enforce curfews and study hour regulations. If students failed to abide by these study hour regulations, curfews, or were absent from too many classes, the president of Reinhardt would be notified, and the students expelled.

Additionally, alcohol (except "health tonics" prescribed by a student's family), bad public behavior, cheating, dishonesty, falsehood, fighting, gambling, malicious mischief, quarreling, playing cards, profanity, social dancing, tattling, and the use of tobacco, except for boys with permission from their parents, were prohibited.

Girls were not allowed to tilt their chairs or cross their feet, and they had to call faculty members by their titles. Starting in 1905, girls had to wear uniforms (see Early academic history) and by 1908 men were required to wear military uniforms. The wearing of uniforms stopped in 1912.

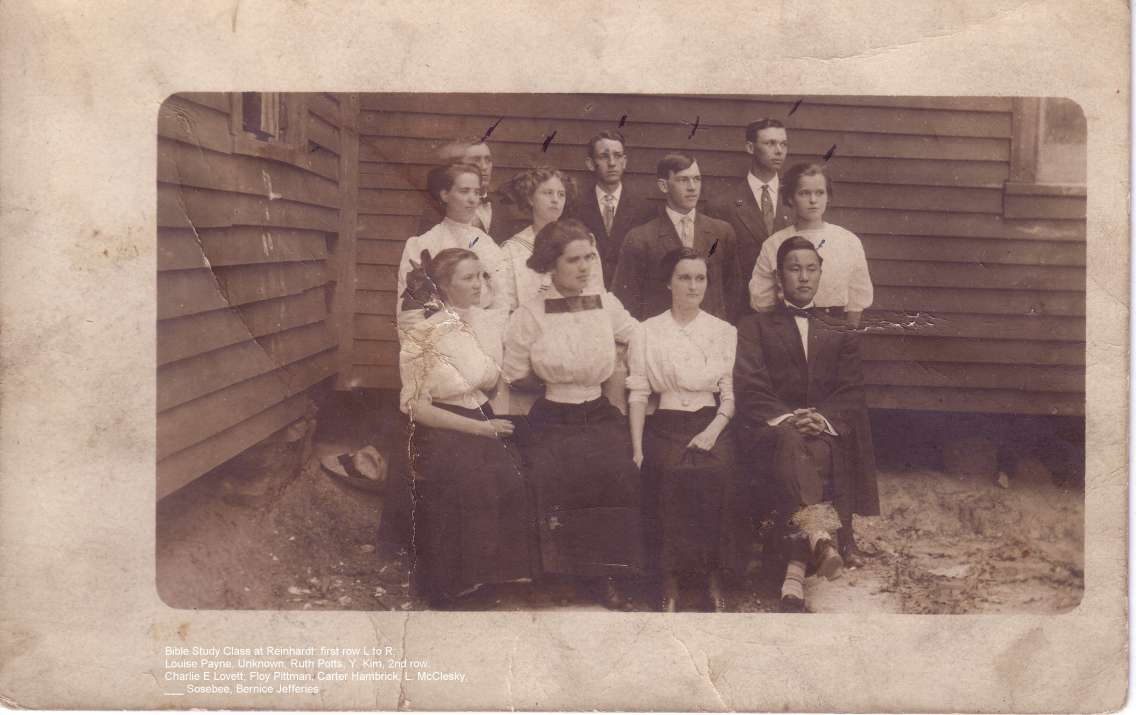
1913 Reinhardt College Bible study class

From 1912 to 1927, soft drinks were prohibited on campus. Students caught with them could be expelled. This changed, however, as a result of Coca-Cola employee Dr. Samuel Candler Dobbs donating money to the school for construction of an educational building in 1926 (see Early campus history).

All of these prohibitions were relaxed and had disappeared from the school by the early 1960s, with the exception of alcohol, which is still prohibited.

=== Early student activities ===
From its founding, Reinhardt students were busy in a wide variety of activities, including athletics, literary societies, military training, music, oratory, patriotic observances and religious programs.

Literary societies

In 1891, Reinhardt President D.C. Evans Patillo formed the Henry W. Grady Debating Club, where eloquence in speaking was highly esteemed, and speaking competitions were held. In 1892, two more literary societies were formed – the George F. Pierce and Atticus G. Haygood Literary Societies. All three of these were open only for male membership. Female students formed their own societies - the Delphian, Phi Alpha and Phi Delta Literary Societies.

Each of these societies held competitions throughout the year for Reinhardt students and the public at large. Topics were generally of national significance. Additionally, these societies staged various annual social events for students, particularly at Christmas and Easter.

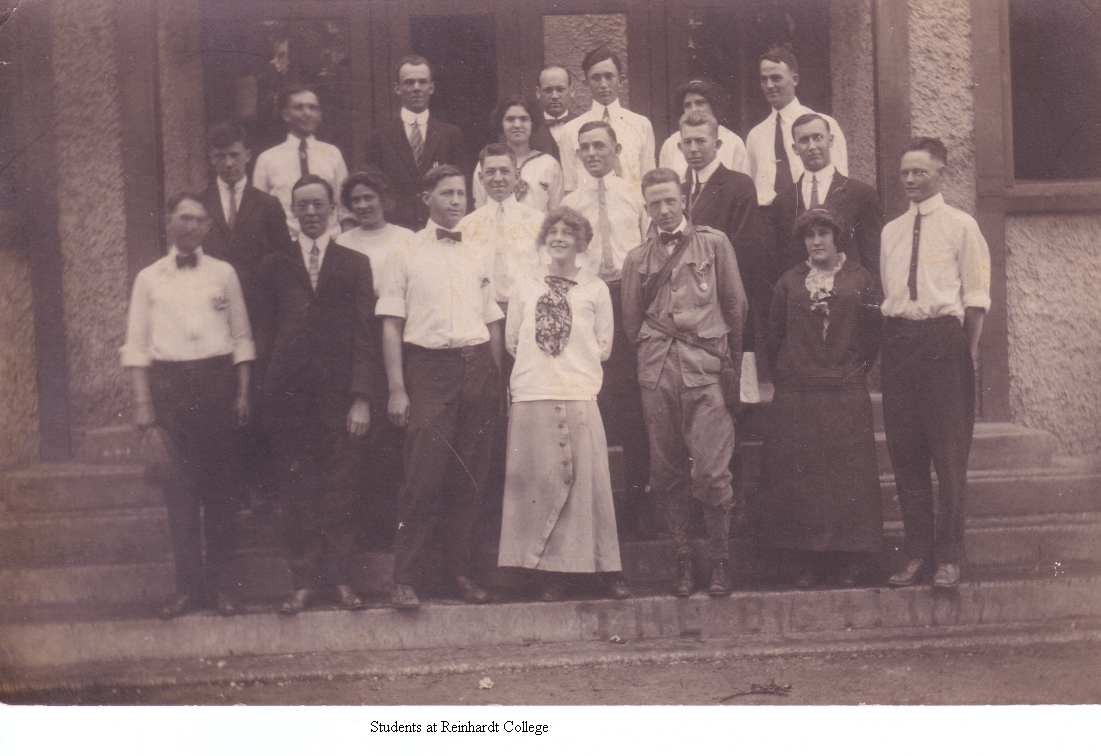
Pre-World War I Reinhardt students standing in front of Mary Stuart Witham Hall, the school's 1912 administration building

Students were encouraged to join these groups as the school felt they provided social activity on the campus and increased school spirit. Much like social fraternities, these societies had initiation ceremonies for new inductees, such as bizarre dress and antics, downing raw eggs, or having students roll a piece of chalk across the floor with their noses while blindfolded.

In 1967, these societies were converted into social fraternities and sororities, allowing students to compete not only in debating, but in athletics, fundraising, social events and scholarship. By the mid-1990s, these organizations had been disbanded.

Religious activities

From Reinhardt's beginning, the school has been associated with the Methodist Church and religious life. Many of the schools early presidents and faculty members were ministers, most notably Emory College graduate James T. Linn who was the school's first teacher.

Not only did the school provide religious instruction for ministerial students, who were, incidentally, not required to pay tuition nor serve in the school's Military Department, but it also provided students with chapel services, morning and evening prayers, vespers, an Epworth League, Wesley Fellowship and Baptist Student Union associations and the Alpha Delta Delta, an association interested in church-related vocations.

Military department and athletics

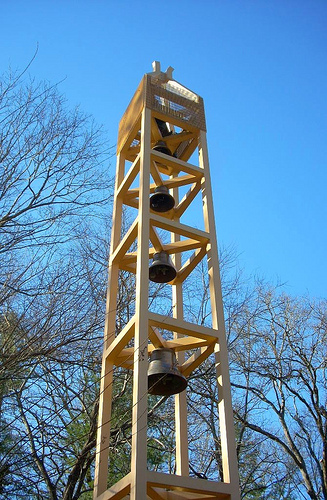
Bratton carillon, named after Mrs. William M. Bratton, organizer of the school's first glee club

In 1893, a military department was established in lieu of a physical education department at Reinhardt. Service in this department was compulsory for able-bodied boys, where they often participated in drills, exercises, encampments, dress parades and mock skirmishes. By 1909, the department had a uniformed band. In 1922, the Military Department was replaced by the Department of Physical Culture.

By the 1920s, Reinhardt had a football team that competed with neighboring high schools. Soon, however, interest in football gave way to basketball. By the 1930s, the school was competing with other Junior College basketball teams in the area.

Intramural sports also have been widely popular at the school since the early part of the 20th century. In the past, boys and girls divided into Indian tribes to compete against one another. The boys played for the Apaches, Comanches, Mohawks or Seminoles, while the girls played for the Choctaws, Pawnees, Sequoyahs or Tallulahs. In the mid-20th century, intramural sports were played under the banner of rival social sororities and fraternities. (Note: The use of the above Indian names by the school was not done disparagingly. See early Reinhardt and Waleska history.)

Musical programs

By 1894, Reinhardt had a Music Department that participated in the school's religious programs, assemblies, special events and commencement exercises.

The Military Department organized a uniformed band by 1909. By 1912, an orchestra had been formed at the school, and a year later, a chorus had been organized. In 1928, Mrs. William M. Bratton, a Reinhardt teacher, organized the school's first glee club. In 1942, Reinhardt librarian Christena Timmons reorganized an orchestra and chorus, which by 1958 had been renamed the Reinhardt Choir. In 2013, Reinhardt added a marching band. Music continues to be a huge draw for prospective students to the school.

Work programs

In 1945, Reinhardt inaugurated a work program for students. This program would allow students to work part-time during the school year or full-time during the summer months to help offset tuition expenses.

Students performed many services under this program, such as housekeeping; ground and building maintenance; firing boilers (before electric heat); working in the cafeteria, library, college office or student center; or working on the school's dairy farm, which is no longer in existence.

== Residence halls ==
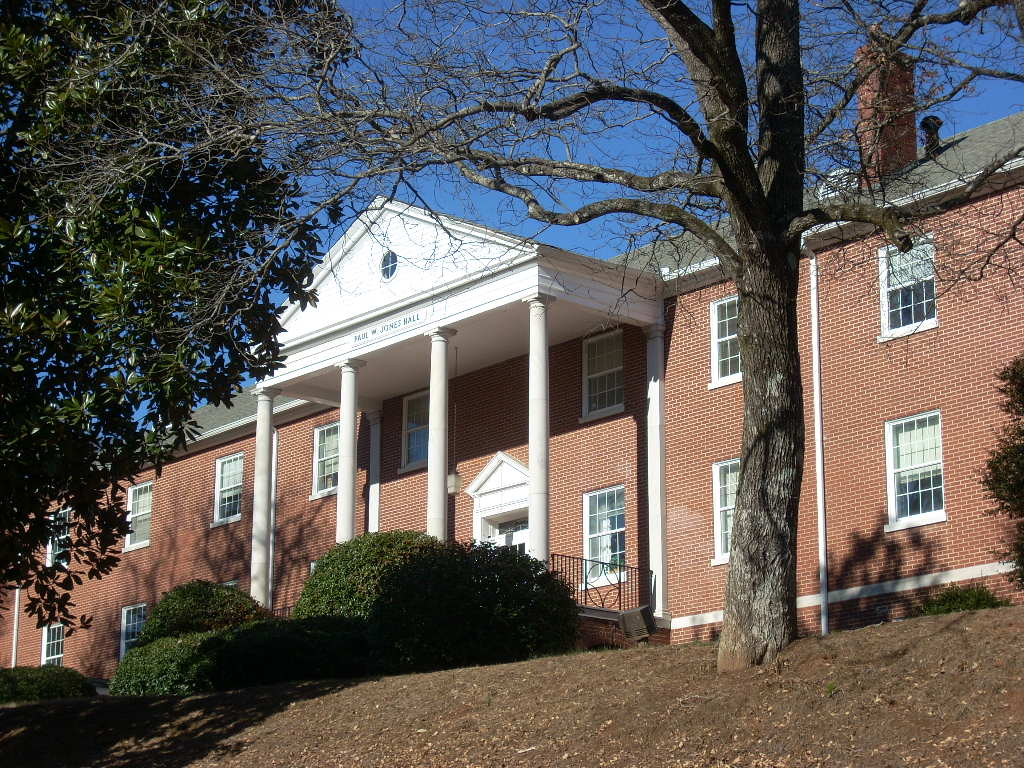
Paul Jones Hall

Reinhardt University has eight traditional residence halls and two apartment-style housing options.

Traditional:

- Herbert I. & Lilla W. Gordy Hall (co-ed)
- Smith L. Johnston Hall (women)
- Roberts Hall (women)
- Glenn H. & Majorie Humphreys Hubbard Hall (men)
- Blue Hall (men)
- Gold Hall (men)
- Eagles View (Freshmen)

Apartments:

- East Hall
- West Hall

=== Early residential history ===
The first resident hall or dormitory at Reinhardt was built for girls in 1896. It was named Heidt Hall in honor of John W. Heidt, who had been president of the college's board of trustees for 20 years (1889–1909). It was torn down in 1939 to make way for Paul Jones Hall.

Boys attending Reinhardt in the last part of the 19th and early part of the 20th century had to board with families in town or group together and rent one of two cottages on campus. The first cottage, the Charles B. and Mary E. Branan Cottage built in 1895, was named after Atlanta railroad executive, merchant and philanthropist J.C.A. Branan's twin children. The second cottage, the Howard W. Payne Memorial Cottage, was built in 1910 by the R. L. Craycroft Sunday School Class of the First Methodist Church of Atlanta.

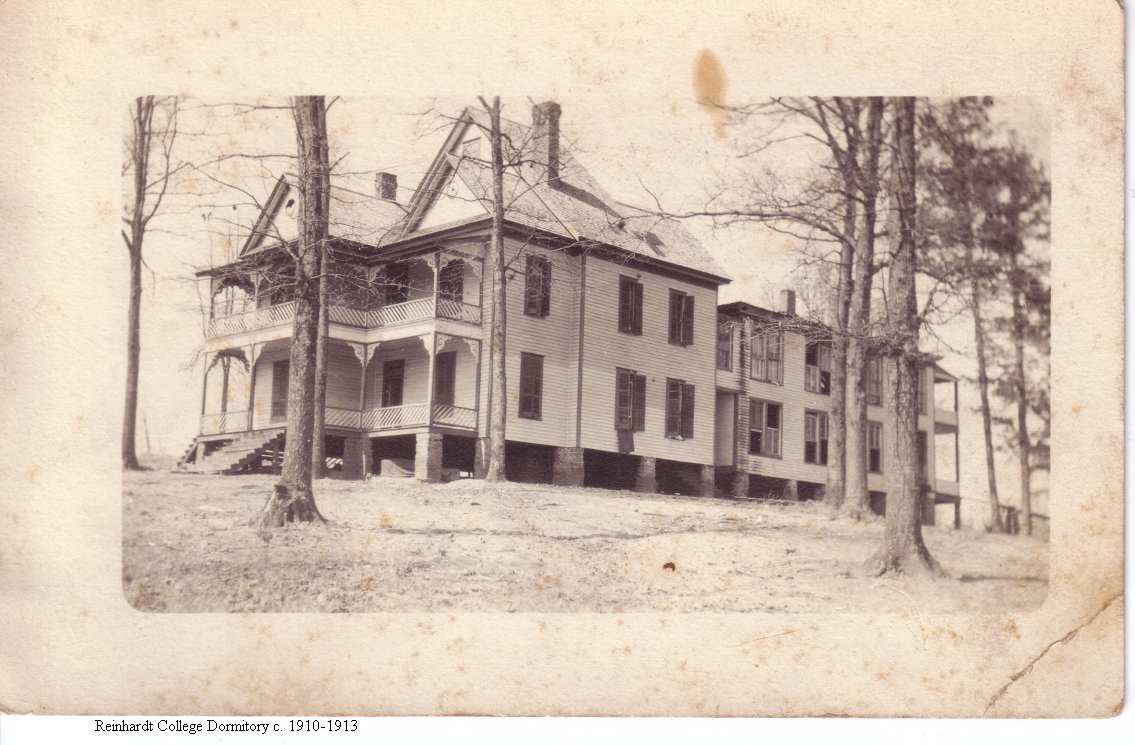
1896 John W. Heidt Hall

By the end of the first decade of the 20th century, Reinhart's male boarding student numbers had escalated, promoting the institution to build two new dormitories for boys in 1911. The first dorm built was Hawkes Hall, which was named after the mother of A. K. Hawkes of Atlanta, who had contributed substantial funds for its construction. The second dorm built was Cherokee Hall, which was named for Cherokee County, whose citizens donated money for its construction. A few years after these were constructed, a third dorm was erected for boys named Lewis Hall. Lewis Hall burned down in 1931 and Hawkes Hall burned down in 1934.

In 1935, Cherokee Hall, a brick dormitory separate from the first 1911 wooden dorm, was built on the site currently occupied by the Hagan Chapel. It burnt down in 1969.

In 1939, Heidt Hall was torn down and replaced by the brick Paul W. Jones Hall, which was named after Paul Walker Jones, a member of the college's board of trustees and president of the Jones Mercantile Company. In 2009, the facility was retired from use as a residence hall. Plans call for it to be renovated as an administrative or academic building.

For two decades, no new residence halls were built. In 1958, board of trustees member John C. Stiles built the Stiles-Dimon Court for boys, naming it after his parents. It was torn down to make way for a new dormitory in the late 1980s.

Also in 1958, Smith L. Johnston Hall for girls was constructed and connected to Paul Jones Hall. Johnston was a former board of trustees member of the school, from a Cherokee County pioneer family, and a prominent lay leader in the North Georgia conference of the Methodist Church.

Towards the later part of the 20th century and into the 21st century, four new housing facilities were built. In 1969, Cobb Hall for boys and Roberts Hall for girls were completed. In 1989, a new living and learning center was built - in 1994, it was named the Herbert I. and Lilla W. Gordy Hall, after the founder of the Gordy Tire Company and his wife. In 2004, East and West Hall, apartment-style residence halls, opened for occupancy.

In 2012 and 2013, three new residence halls were added: the Glenn H. and Marjorie Humphrey Hubbard Residence Hall, Blue Hall and Gold Hall.

== Athletics ==
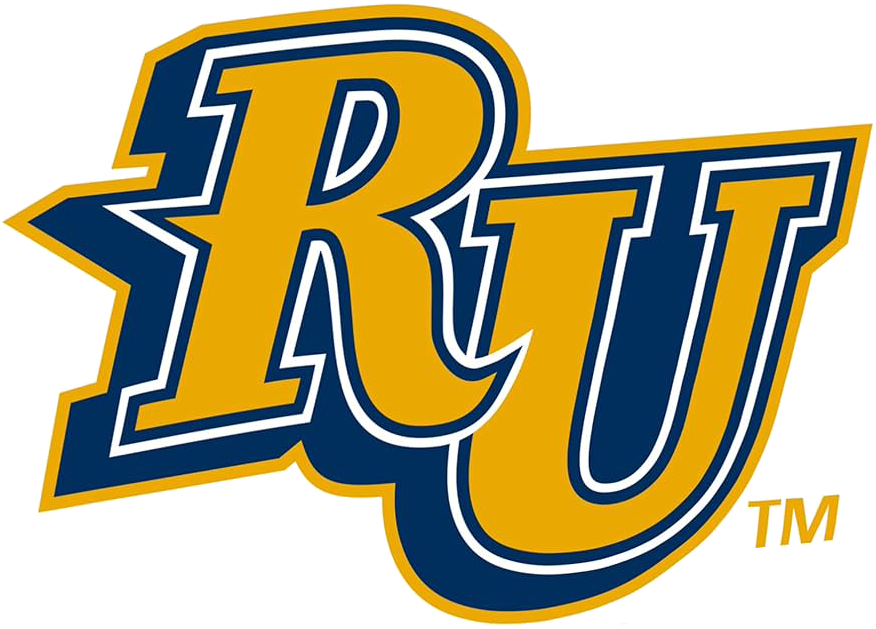
Reinhardt athletics monogram

The Reinhardt athletic teams are called the Eagles. The university is a member of the National Association of Intercollegiate Athletics (NAIA), primarily competing in the Appalachian Athletic Conference (AAC) since the 2009–10 academic year. They were also a member of the National Christian College Athletic Association (NCCAA), primarily competing as an independent in the South Region of the Division I level from 1999–2000 to 2000–01. The Eagles previously competed in the Southern States Athletic Conference (SSAC; formerly known as Georgia–Alabama–Carolina Conference (GACC) until after the 2003–04 school year) from 2000 to 2001 (when they joined the NAIA) to 2008–09. Prior joining the NAIA, Reinhardt was also a member of the National Junior College Athletic Association (NJCAA) and of the National Small College Athletic Association (NSCAA) until after the 1998–99 school year.

Reinhardt competes in 24 intercollegiate varsity sports: Men's sports include baseball, basketball, cross country, football, golf, lacrosse, soccer, tennis, track & field (indoor and outdoor) and wrestling; while women's sports include basketball, cross country, flag football, golf, lacrosse, soccer, softball, tennis, track & field (indoor and outdoor) and volleyball; and co-ed sports include cheerleading. Former sports included men's and women's bowling.

=== Colors ===
The university's uniforms reflect the university colors of navy and gold.

=== Football ===
After dropping their football program in 1920, Reinhardt revived football in 2013 as a member of the Mid-South Conference (MSC).

== Notable alumni ==
- James Curran Davis, US Congressman from fifth District of Georgia (1946–1962)
- Terry Coleman, J.D. Speaker of the Georgia House of Representatives
- Frank Gordy, founder of The Varsity restaurant chain
- Sachi Koto, professional journalist, former news anchor for CNN Headline News
- John H. Smithwick, Democratic congressman from Florida (1919–1927)
- Dorothy Rogers Tilly, Progressive-era civil rights activist

== Notable current or former faculty ==
- Kevin Crawford, Shakespeare scholar
- Newt Gingrich, former adjunct professor at Reinhardt, former Speaker of the U.S. House of Representatives
- Mary Hood (2001 writer-in-residence), short story writer and novelist
