= Waleska, Georgia =

- City
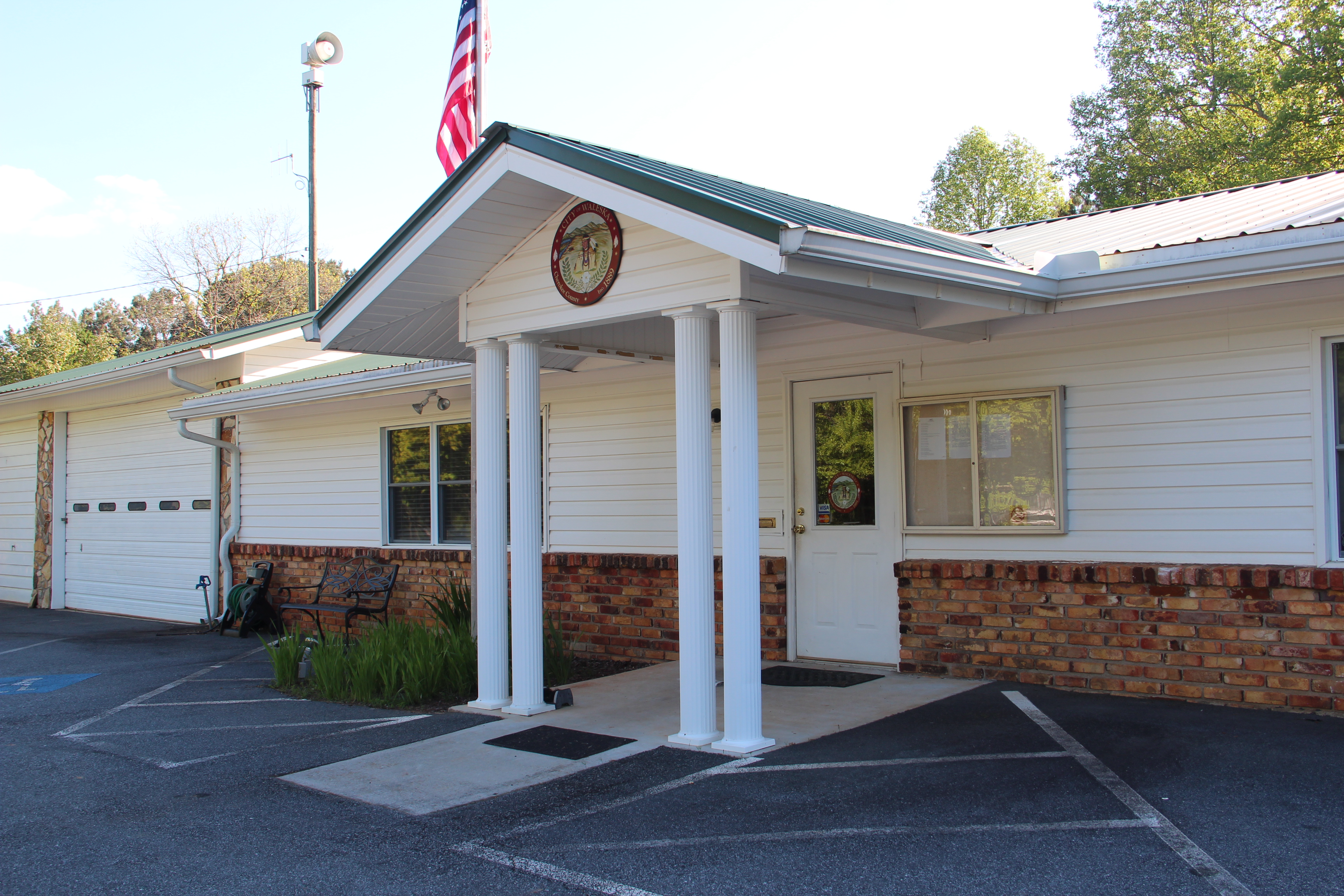
- Waleska city hall

- Seal

- Location in Cherokee County and the state of Georgia
- Coordinates: 34°19′5″N 84°33′11″W
- Country: United States
- State: Georgia
- County: Cherokee

Area
  - Total: 1.59 sq mi (4.11 km^{2})
  - Land: 1.58 sq mi (4.09 km^{2})
  - Water: 0.0077 sq mi (0.02 km^{2})
- Elevation: 1,109 ft (338 m)

Population (2020)
  - Total: 921
  - Density: 583.2/sq mi (225.16/km^{2})
- Time zone: UTC-5 (Eastern (EST))
  - Summer (DST): UTC-4 (EDT)
- ZIP code: 30183
- Area codes: 770/678/470
- FIPS code: 13-79948
- GNIS feature ID: 0333342
- Website: cityofwaleska.com

Waleska (/wɔːˈlɛskə/ waw-LES-kə) is a city in Cherokee County, Georgia, United States. As of the 2020 census, Waleska had a population of 921.

== History ==
The first white settlement in the Waleska area began in the early 1830s. Among these first pioneer settlers were the Reinhardt, Heard and Rhyne families, who moved into the region looking for fresh, fertile farm land. At first, these settlers lived among the Cherokee population already established in the area, but by 1838 all of the Cherokee had been forced westward to Oklahoma in the U.S. government relocation movement known as the Trail of Tears.

Early settler Lewis W. Reinhardt established a church in 1834 in the settlement known as Reinhardt Chapel and befriended many of the native Cherokee population. When the Trail of Tears forced the movement of Warluskee, the daughter of a local Cherokee chief and friend of Reinhardt's, westward, he named this settlement in her honor (see Funk Heritage Center below).

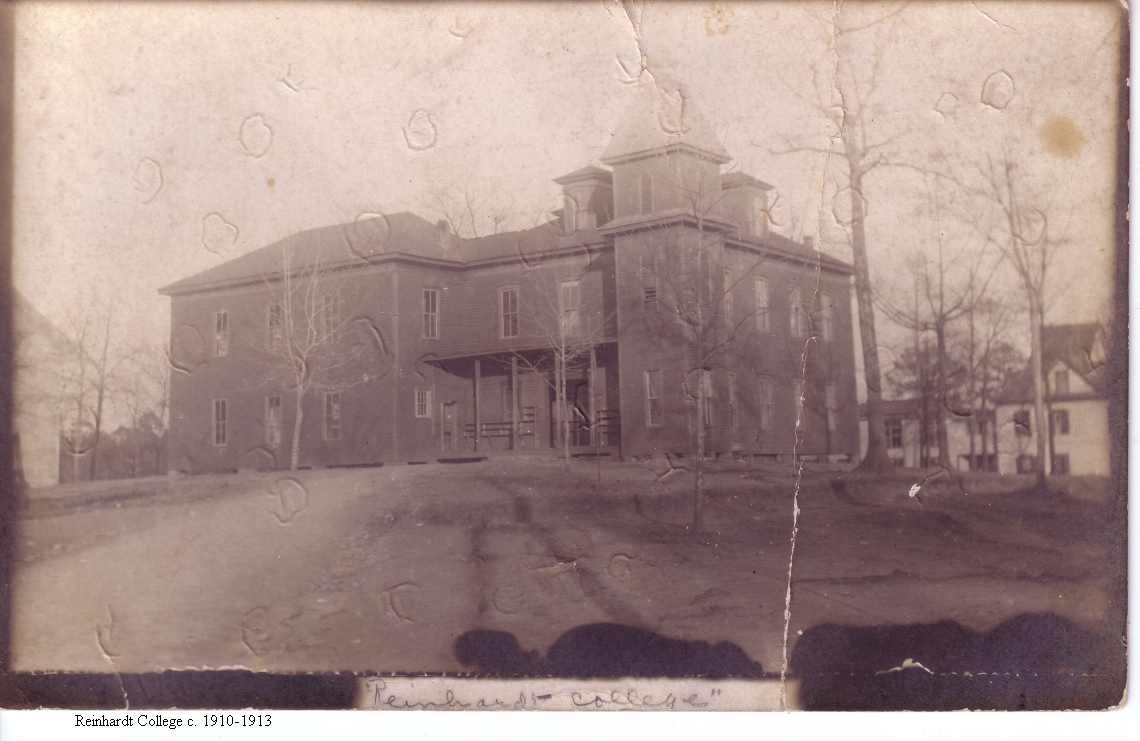
1885 Reinhardt University administration building

In 1883, Augustus M. Reinhardt, an Atlanta lawyer, former Confederate captain, and son of one of the founders of Waleska, along with his brother-in-law, former Civil War Lieutenant-Colonel John J. A. Sharp, founded Reinhardt Academy in Waleska for the impoverished children of Cherokee County. This school eventually became Reinhardt University.

The city was officially incorporated in 1889, over 50 years after the establishment of the original farming settlement.

While industry in Waleska's past has included tobacco farming, manufacturing, some mineral development, lumbering, and agriculture, which are both still active in the area, the chief "industry" of the town is and has always been Reinhardt University.

== Geography ==
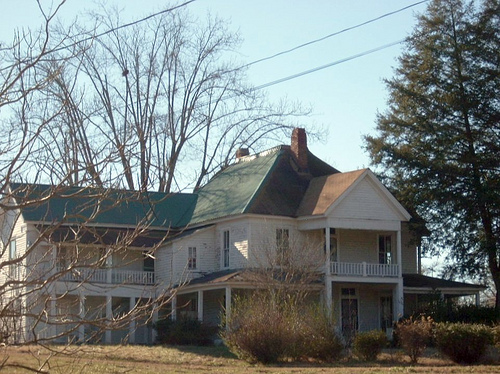
The historic Cline Home in Waleska

Waleska is located in northwestern Cherokee County at 34°19′5″N 84°33′11″W (34.317968, -84.552951). State Routes 140 and 108 intersect in the center of town. SR 140 leads southeast 7 miles (11 km) to Canton, the county seat, and west 25 miles (40 km) to Adairsville. SR 108 leads northeast 13 miles (21 km) to Tate and southwest 23 miles (37 km) to Cartersville.

According to the United States Census Bureau, Waleska has a total area of 1.5 square miles (3.8 km^{2}), of which 0.008 square miles (0.02 km^{2}), or 0.51%, is water.

== Demographics ==
Historical population
Census	Pop.	Note	%±
1900	170		—
1910	243		42.9%
1920	308		26.7%
1930	226		−26.6%
1940	264		16.8%
1950	385		45.8%
1960	479		24.4%
1970	487		1.7%
1980	450		−7.6%
1990	700		55.6%
2000	616		−12.0%
2010	644		4.5%
2020	921		43.0%
U.S. Decennial Census

=== 2020 census ===
Waleska racial composition
Race	Num.	Perc.
White (non-Hispanic)	674	73.18%
Black or African American (non-Hispanic)	135	14.66%
Native American	6	0.65%
Asian	9	0.98%
Pacific Islander	1	0.11%
Other/Mixed	23	2.5%
Hispanic or Latino	73	7.93%

As of the 2020 United States census, there were 921 people, 94 households, and 67 families residing in the city.

=== 2000 census ===
As of the census of 2000, there were 616 people living in the city. The population density was 1.8 people per square mile (0.69 people/km^{2}). The racial makeup of the city was 88.96% White, 3.90% African American, 0.32% Native American, 1.30% Asian, 0.16% Pacific Islander, 0.81% from other races, and 4.55% from two or more races. Hispanic or Latino of any race were 2.60% of the population.

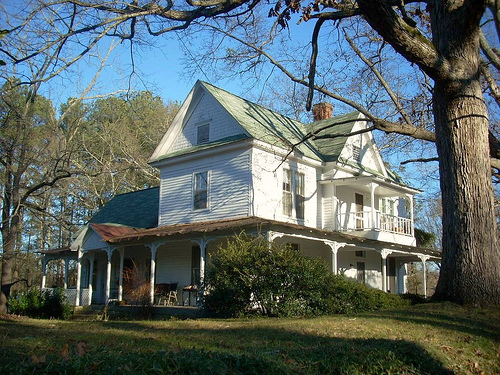
Historic home, Waleska, Ga.

There were 107 households, out of which 31.8% had children under the age of 18 living with them, 57.9% were married couples living together, 10.3% had a female householder with no husband present, and 26.2% were non-families. 23.4% of all households were made up of individuals, and 8.4% had someone living alone who was 65 years of age or older. The average household size was 2.43 and the average family size was 2.81.

In the city, the population was spread out, with 10.7% under the age of 18, 58.4% from 18 to 24, 14.0% from 25 to 44, 11.9% from 45 to 64, and 5.0% who were 65 years of age or older. The median age was 21 years. For every 100 females, there were 77.5 males. For every 100 females age 18 and over, there were 74.6 males.

The median income for a household in the city was $46,071, and the median income for a family was $51,250. Males had a median income of $36,500 versus $33,750 for females. The per capita income for the city was $11,126. About 5.5% of families and 5.1% of the population were below the poverty line, including none of those under age 18 and 18.9% of those age 65 or over.

== Education ==
=== Colleges and universities ===
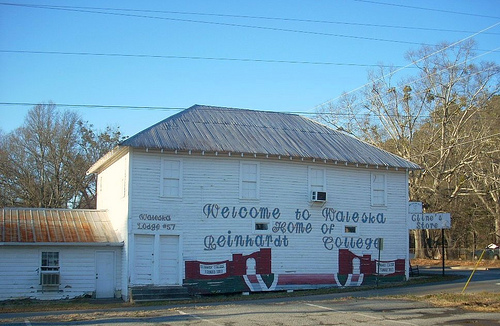
Reinhardt College mural in downtown Waleska

Waleska, which is 48 miles (77 km) north of Atlanta and 82 miles (132 km) southeast of Chattanooga, Tennessee, is the home of Reinhardt University. Founded in 1883, Reinhardt offers undergraduate and graduate degrees and is affiliated with the United Methodist Church. In addition to this main campus, the school has an off-campus site, Reinhardt University's North Fulton Center, located in Alpharetta, and offers select programs of study in Cartersville and Canton, Georgia, as well as online courses.

Reinhardt University is also the home of the Funk Heritage Center, Georgia's Official Frontier and Southeastern Indian Interpretive Center.

=== K-12 schools ===
Areas in Cherokee County are in the Cherokee County School District. Waleska residents are zoned to R. M. Moore Elementary School, Teasley Middle School, and Cherokee High School.

== Neighboring areas ==
- Lake Arrowhead, a reservoir with residential development, is 2 miles (3 km) west of Waleska (5 to 7 miles (8 to 11 km) west by car).
