= 2014 Southern Conference football season =

- League: NCAA Division I FCS (Football Championship Subdivision)
- Sport: Football
- Duration: August 28, 2014 – November 22, 2014
- Teams: 8
- TV partner(s): SoConTV; American Sports Network

Southern Conference football seasons
- ← 2013 2015 →

2014 Southern Conference football standings
	Conf.			Overall
Team	W		L	W		L
No. 8 Chattanooga $^	7	–	0	10	–	4
Samford	5	–	2	7	–	4
Western Carolina	5	–	2	7	–	5
Wofford	4	–	3	6	–	5
The Citadel	3	–	4	5	–	7
Furman	2	–	5	3	–	9
Mercer	1	–	6	6	–	6
VMI	1	–	6	2	–	10
$ – Conference champion; ^ – FCS playoff participant; Rankings from The Sports Network poll

The 2014 Southern Conference football season was the 93rd season of college football for the Southern Conference (SoCon) and formed a part of the 2014 NCAA Division I FCS football season.

It was the first season for two newcomers: the Mercer Bears, who previously played in the Pioneer Football League, and the VMI Keydets, who had an 80-year stint in the SoCon before joining the Big South Conference in 2003. The additions of Mercer and VMI, along with East Tennessee State, who is bringing back football in 2015, replaced the departure of Georgia Southern and Appalachian State who joined the Sun Belt Conference, as well as Elon who left for the Colonial Athletic Association.

== Previous season ==
In 2013, both Appalachian State and Georgia Southern were ineligible for postseason play due to their transition to the FBS in 2014. Both schools had down years, each going 4–4 in conference play, with Georgia Southern posting a 7–4 overall mark to Appalachian State's 4–8. At the top of the conference was a three-way tie between Chattanooga, Samford, and Furman, who all posted 6–2 conference records. The three schools were declared co-champions, though only Samford and Furman were selected to participate in the FCS tournament.

Samford, who finished ranked #18 in the coaches poll, was defeated in the second round of the playoffs by Jacksonville State on the road, 55–14. Furman, ranked #22, beat South Carolina State in their opening round game in Orangeburg by a score of 30–20. They were knocked out the following week by North Dakota State, who went on to win their third straight national title.

Newcomer Mercer finished their tenure in the Pioneer League on a high note, going 10–2 and 6–2 in conference play, narrowly missing out on the playoffs. VMI was 2–10 in 2013, including a 1–4 mark in Big South play, beating Gardner–Webb.

== Head coaches ==
- Russ Huesman, Chattanooga – 6th year
- Mike Houston, The Citadel – 1st year
- Bruce Fowler, Furman – 4th year
- Pat Sullivan, Samford – 7th year
- Bobby Lamb, Mercer – 2nd year
- Sparky Woods, VMI – 7th year
- Mark Speir, Western Carolina – 3rd year
- Mike Ayers, Wofford – 27th year

== Preseason poll results ==
First place votes in parentheses

Media			Coaches		
Place	School	Points	Place	School	Points
1	Chattanooga (29)	235	1	Chattanooga (6)	48
2	Furman (1)	203	2	Furman (1)	40
3	Samford	174	2	Samford (1)	40
4	Wofford	155	4	Wofford	30
5	Western Carolina	105	5	Western Carolina	24
6	The Citadel	103	6	The Citadel	22
7	Mercer	67	7	Mercer	10
8	VMI	38	7	VMI	10

== Rankings ==
Legend
Increase in ranking
Decrease in ranking
Not ranked previous week

		Pre	Wk 1	Wk 2	Wk 3	Wk 4	Wk 5	Wk 6	Wk 7	Wk 8	Wk 9	Wk 10	Wk 11	Wk 12	Wk 13	Final
Chattanooga	TSN	14	13	14	15	14	14	13	17	15	14	13	9	9	8	8
Chattanooga	C	16	15	17	14	15	14	12	15	14	12	11	9	9	9	8
The Citadel	TSN	-	-	-	-	-	-	-	-	-	-	-	-	-	-	-
The Citadel	C	-	-	-	-	-	-	-	-	-	-	-	-	-	-	-
Furman	TSN	18	17	12	21	RV	RV	RV	RV	RV	-	-	-	-	-	-
Furman	C	21	19	12	21	RV	-	-	-	-	-	-	-	-	-	-
Mercer	TSN	-	-	-	RV	-	-	-	-	-	-	-	-	-	-	-
Mercer	C	-	-	-	-	-	-	-	-	-	-	-	-	-	-	-
Samford	TSN	RV	RV	RV	RV	RV	RV	RV	RV	RV	RV	RV	RV	RV	RV	RV
Samford	C	RV	RV	RV	RV	RV	RV	RV	RV	RV	-	-	-	-	-	-
VMI	TSN	-	-	-	-	-	-	-	-	-	-	-	-	-	-	-
VMI	C	-	-	-	-	-	-	-	-	-	-	-	-	-	-	-
Western Carolina	TSN	-	-	RV	RV	RV	RV	-	-	RV	RV	RV	RV	RV	-	-
Western Carolina	C	-	-	-	-	-	RV	RV	-	RV	RV	-	-	-	-	-
Wofford	TSN	RV	RV	RV	RV	RV	RV	RV	RV	RV	RV	RV	-	-	-	-
Wofford	C	RV	RV	RV	RV	-	-	-	-	RV	-	-	-	-	-	-

== Regular season ==
Index to colors and formatting
SoCon member won
SoCon member lost
SoCon teams in **bold**

All times Eastern time.

Rankings reflect that of the Sports Network poll for that week.

=== Week One ===
Date	Time	Visiting team	Home team	Site	Broadcast	Result	Attendance	Reference
August 28	7:00 PM	**Chattanooga**	Central Michigan	Kelly/Shorts Stadium • Mount Pleasant, MI	ESPN3	**L** 16–20	15,793	
August 28	7:00 PM	Reinhardt	**Mercer**	Moye Complex • Macon, GA	ESPN3	**W** 45–42	10,027	
August 30	7:00 PM	**Samford**	TCU	Amon G. Carter Stadium • Fort Worth, TX		**L** 14–48	40,094	
August 30	12:30 PM	**Wofford**	Georgia Tech	Bobby Dodd Stadium • Atlanta, GA	ESPN3	**L** 19–38	45,403	
August 30	6:00 PM	**VMI**	Bucknell	Christy Mathewson–Memorial Stadium • Lewisburg, PA		**L** 38–42	3,124	
August 30	7:00 PM	**Western Carolina**	South Florida	Raymond James Stadium • Tampa, FL	ESPN3	**L** 31–36	31,642	
August 30	7:00 PM	Gardner–Webb	**Furman**	Paladin Stadium • Greenville, SC		**W** 13–3	7,533	
August 30	6:00 PM	Coastal Carolina	**The Citadel**	Johnson Hagood Stadium • Charleston, SC		**L** 16–31	10,828	

Players of the week:

Offensive		Defensive		Freshman		Special teams	
Player	Team	Player	Team	Player	Team	Player	Team
Troy Mitchell	Western Carolina	Gary Wilkins	Furman	Al Cobb	VMI	David Marvin	Wofford
**Reference: Weekly Release**

=== Week Two ===
Date	Time	Visiting team	Home team	Site	Broadcast	Result	Attendance	Reference
September 6	3:30 PM	**VMI**	Bowling Green	Doyt Perry Stadium • Bowling Green, OH	ESPN3	**L** 7–48	18,311	
September 6	3:30 PM	Brevard College	**Western Carolina**	E. J. Whitmire Stadium • Cullowhee, NC		**W** 45–21	8,929	
September 6	6:00 PM	Jacksonville State	**Chattanooga**	Finley Stadium • Chattanooga, TN		**L** 23–26^{OT}	14,285	
September 6	6:00 PM	**Furman**	**Mercer**	Moye Complex • Macon, GA	ESPN3	**FUR** 25–20	12,227	
September 6	7:30 PM	**The Citadel**	Florida State	Doak Campbell Stadium • Tallahassee, FL	RSN	**L** 12–37	81,294	

Players of the week:

Offensive		Defensive		Freshman		Special teams	
Player	Team	Player	Team	Player	Team	Player	Team
Darius Ramsey	Western Carolina	Gary Wilkins	Furman	John Croft Hollingsworth	Furman	Lucas Webb	Chattanooga
**Reference: Weekly Release**

=== Week Three ===
Date	Time	Visiting team	Home team	Site	Broadcast	Result	Attendance	Reference
September 11	7:30 PM	Stillman	**Samford**	Seibert Stadium • Homewood, AL		**W** 52–0	4,968	
September 13	1:30 PM	Davidson	**VMI**	Alumni Memorial Field • Lexington, VA		**W** 52–24	4,479	
September 13	3:30 PM	Catawba	**Western Carolina**	E. J. Whitmire Stadium • Cullowhee, NC		**W** 35–17	10,511	
September 13	5:00 PM	**Chattanooga**	Austin Peay	Governors Stadium • Clarksville, TN		**W** 42–6	6,883	
September 13	6:00 PM	**Mercer**	Stetson	Spec Martin Stadium • DeLand, FL		**W** 49–0	3,660	
September 13	7:00 PM	**Furman**	Presbyterian	Bailey Memorial Stadium • Clinton, SC	WMYA-TV	**L** 7–10	2,321	
September 13	7:00 PM	North Greenville	**Wofford**	Gibbs Stadium • Spartanburg, SC		**W** 42–27	7,392	

Players of the week:

Offensive		Defensive		Freshman		Special teams	
Player	Team	Player	Team	Player	Team	Player	Team
Aaron Sanders	VMI	Daniel Riddle	Western Carolina	Alex Lakes	Mercer	Tommy Hudson	Chattanooga
**Reference: Weekly Release**

=== Week Four ===
Date	Time	Visiting team	Home team	Site	Broadcast	Result	Attendance	Reference
September 20	3:00 PM	**VMI**	**Samford**	Seibert Stadium • Homewood, AL	ESPN3	**SAM** 63–21	4,618	
September 20	6:00 PM	**The Citadel**	Charleston Southern	Buccaneer Field • North Charleston, SC		**L** 18–20	7,954	
September 20	6:00 PM	**Furman**	South Carolina State	Oliver C. Dawson Stadium • Orangeburg, SC		**L** 7–17	9,613	
September 20	6:00 PM	Ave Maria	**Mercer**	Moye Complex • Macon, GA	ESPN3	**W** 42–21	10,173	
September 20	6:00 PM	**Wofford**	Gardner–Webb	Spangler Stadium • Boiling Springs, NC		**L** 36–43	6,450	

Players of the week:

Offensive		Defensive		Freshman		Special teams	
Player	Team	Player	Team	Player	Team	Player	Team
Denzel Williams	Samford	Josh Kimberlin	Samford	Krondis Larry	Samford	Chandler Curtis	Mercer
**Reference: Weekly Release**

=== Week Five ===
Date	Time	Visiting team	Home team	Site	Broadcast	Result	Attendance	Reference
September 27	1:30 PM	**Mercer**	**VMI**	Alumni Memorial Field • Lexington, VA		**MER** 27–24	4,490	
September 27	3:00 PM	**Western Carolina**	**Furman**	Paladin Stadium • Greenville, SC		**WCU** 35–17	9,789	
September 27	6:00 PM	Gardner–Webb	**The Citadel**	Johnson Hagood Stadium • Charleston, SC		**W** 37–14	8,573	
September 27	7:00 PM	UVA–Wise	**Wofford**	Gibbs Stadium • Spartanburg, SC		**W** 49–15	7,108	
September 27	7:00 PM	**Samford**	**Chattanooga**	Finley Stadium • Chattanooga, TN		**UTC** 38–24	8,872	

Players of the week:

Offensive		Defensive		Freshman		Special teams	
Player	Team	Player	Team	Player	Team	Player	Team
Spearman Robinson	Western Carolina	Davis Tull	Chattanooga	Chandler Curtis	Mercer	Tommy Hudson	Chattanooga
**Reference: Weekly Release**

=== Week Six ===
Date	Time	Visiting team	Home team	Site	Broadcast	Result	Attendance	Reference
October 4	1:30 PM	**The Citadel**	**Wofford**	Gibbs Stadium • Spartanburg, SC	ESPN3	**WOF** 17–13	9,259	
October 4	2:00 PM	**Western Carolina**	Presbyterian	Bailey Memorial Stadium • Clinton, SC		**L** 14–19	4,007	
October 4	3:00 PM	**Mercer**	**Samford**	Seibert Stadium • Homewood, AL		**SAM** 21–18	8,713	
October 4	4:00 PM	**VMI**	**Chattanooga**	Finley Stadium • Chattanooga, TN		**UTC** 55–7	8,848	
October 4	7:00 PM	Coastal Carolina	**Furman**	Paladin Stadium • Greenville, SC	ESPN3	**L** 31–37^{2OT}	7,347	

Players of the week:

Offensive		Defensive		Freshman		Special teams	
Player	Team	Player	Team	Player	Team	Player	Team
Jacob Huesman	Chattanooga	Mitchell Jeter	The Citadel	P. J. Blazejowski	Furman	Chandler Curtis	Mercer
**Reference: Weekly Release**

=== Week Seven ===
Date	Time	Visiting team	Home team	Site	Broadcast	Result	Attendance	Reference
October 11	2:00 PM	Charlotte	**The Citadel**	Johnson Hagood Stadium • Charleston, SC		**W** 63–56^{2OT}	10,467	
October 11	3:30 PM	**VMI**	Navy	Navy–Marine Corps Memorial Stadium • Annapolis, MD	CBSSN	**L** 14–51	33,812	
October 11	3:30 PM	**Wofford**	**Western Carolina**	E. J. Whitmire Stadium • Cullowhee, NC	ESPN3	**WCU** 26–14	7,343	
October 11	4:00 PM	Austin Peay	**Mercer**	Moye Complex • Macon, GA	ESPN3	**W** 49–21	8,027	
October 11	4:00 PM	**Chattanooga**	Tennessee	Neyland Stadium • Knoxville, TN	SECN	**L** 10–45	93,097	

Players of the week:

Offensive		Defensive		Freshman		Special teams	
Player	Team	Player	Team	Player	Team	Player	Team
Aaron Miller	The Citadel	Christon Gill	Western Carolina	Cam Jackson	The Citadel	Detrez Newsome	Western Carolina
**Reference: Weekly Release**

=== Week Eight ===
Date	Time	Visiting team	Home team	Site	Broadcast	Result	Attendance	Reference
October 18	12:00 PM	**Furman**	South Carolina	Williams-Brice Stadium • Columbia, SC	SECN	**L** 10–41	78,101	
October 18	12:00 PM	**Chattanooga**	**The Citadel**	Johnson Hagood Stadium • Charleston, SC		**UTC** 34–14	8,037	
October 18	1:30 PM	Gardner–Webb	**VMI**	Alumni Memorial Field • Lexington, VA		**L** 41–47^{2OT}	6,624	
October 18	3:00 PM	**Wofford**	**Samford**	Seibert Stadium • Homewood, AL		**WOF** 24–20	4,157	
October 18	4:00 PM	**Western Carolina**	**Mercer**	Moye Complex • Macon, GA	ESPN3	**WCU** 35–21	9,277	

Players of the week:

Offensive		Defensive		Freshman		Special teams	
Player	Team	Player	Team	Player	Team	Player	Team
Spearman Robinson	Western Carolina	Jaleel Lorquet	Western Carolina	Al Cobb	VMI	Henrique Ribiero	Chattanooga
**Reference: Weekly Release**

=== Week Nine ===
Date	Time	Visiting team	Home team	Site	Broadcast	Result	Attendance	Reference
October 25	12:00 PM	**Mercer**	**Chattanooga**	Finley Stadium • Chattanooga, TN	ASN	**UTC** 38–31	10,763	
October 25	1:30 PM	**VMI**	**Wofford**	Gibbs Stadium • Spartanburg, SC		**WOF** 38–3	8,010	
October 25	1:30 PM	**Samford**	**Furman**	Paladin Stadium • Greenville, SC	ESPN3	**SAM** 45–0	8,047	
October 25	2:00 PM	**The Citadel**	**Western Carolina**	E. J. Whitmire Stadium • Cullowhee, NC		**WCU** 29–15	13,323	

Players of the week:

Offensive		Defensive		Freshman		Special teams	
Player	Team	Player	Team	Player	Team	Player	Team
Jacob Huesman	Chattanooga	Trey Morgan	Western Carolina	Detrez Newsome	Western Carolina	Deion Pierre	Samford
**Reference: Weekly Release**

=== Week Ten ===
Date	Time	Visiting team	Home team	Site	Broadcast	Result	Attendance	Reference
November 1	1:30 PM	**Furman**	**VMI**	Alumni Memorial Field • Lexington, VA	ESPN3	**VMI** 31–15	3,624	
November 1	2:00 PM	**Chattanooga**	**Western Carolina**	E. J. Whitmire Stadium • Cullowhee, NC		**UTC** 51–0	8,705	
November 1	3:00 PM	Concordia	**Samford**	Seibert Stadium • Homewood, AL		**SAM** 55–0	4,871	
November 1	4:00 PM	**The Citadel**	**Mercer**	Moye Complex • Macon, GA	ESPN3	**CIT** 28–26	10,271	

Players of the week:

Offensive		Defensive		Freshman		Special teams	
Player	Team	Player	Team	Player	Team	Player	Team
Keon Williams	Chattanooga	DeVonta Delaney	The Citadel	Al Cobb	VMI	Henrique Ribeiro	Chattanooga
**Reference: Weekly Release**

=== Week Eleven ===
Date	Time	Visiting team	Home team	Site	Broadcast	Result	Attendance	Reference
November 8	1:00 PM	**Wofford**	**Chattanooga**	Finley Stadium • Chattanooga, TN	ESPN3	**UTC** 31–30	9,692	
November 8	2:00 PM	**Furman**	**The Citadel**	Johnson Hagood Stadium • Charleston, SC		**CIT** 42–35^{OT}	11,488	
November 8	3:30 PM	**Western Carolina**	**Samford**	Seibert Stadium • Homewood, AL	ASN	**SAM** 34–20	4,689	

Players of the week:

Offensive		Defensive		Freshman		Special teams	
Player	Team	Player	Team	Player	Team	Player	Team
Aaron Miller	The Citadel	Justin Cooper	Samford	P. J. Blazejowski	Furman	Nick Pollard	Chattanooga
**Reference: Weekly Release**

=== Week Twelve ===
Date	Time	Visiting team	Home team	Site	Broadcast	Result	Attendance	Reference
November 15	12:00 PM	**Wofford**	**Furman**	Paladin Stadium • Greenville, SC	ESPN3	**FUR** 31–14	6,282	
November 15	1:00 PM	**Samford**	**The Citadel**	Johnson Hagood Stadium • Charleston, SC		**SAM** 20–17	7,638	
November 15	2:00 PM	**VMI**	**Western Carolina**	E. J. Whitmire Stadium • Cullowhee, NC		**WCU** 42–27	8,339	
November 15	2:30 PM	**Chattanooga**	Tennessee Tech	Tucker Stadium • Cookeville, TN		**W** 38–17	4,009	
November 15	4:00 PM	Warner	**Mercer**	Moye Complex • Macon, GA	ESPN3	**W** 56–0	10,000	

Players of the week:

Offensive		Defensive		Freshman		Special teams	
Player	Team	Player	Team	Player	Team	Player	Team
Troy Mitchell	Western Carolina	Justin Cooper	Samford	P. J. Blazejowski	Furman	Greg Peranich	Samford
**Reference: Weekly Release**

=== Week Thirteen ===
Date	Time	Visiting team	Home team	Site	Broadcast	Result	Attendance	Reference
November 22	1:30 PM	**Mercer**	**Wofford**	Gibbs Stadium • Spartanburg, SC		**WOF** 34–6	7,051	
November 22	1:30 PM	**The Citadel**	**VMI**	Alumni Memorial Field • Lexington, VA	ESPN3	**CIT** 45–25	7,097	
November 22	3:30 PM	**Chattanooga**	**Furman**	Paladin Stadium • Greenville, SC		**UTC** 45–19	4,377	
November 22	4:00 PM	**Western Carolina**	Alabama	Bryant–Denny Stadium • Tuscaloosa, AL	SECN	**L** 17–48	101,325	
November 22	7:00 PM	**Samford**	Auburn	Jordan–Hare Stadium • Auburn, AL	ESPNU	**L** 7–31	87,451	

Players of the week:

Offensive		Defensive		Freshman		Special teams	
Player	Team	Player	Team	Player	Team	Player	Team
Jacob Huesman	Chattanooga	Malik Diggs	The Citadel	Al Cobb	VMI	Greg Peranich	Samford
**Reference: Weekly Release**

== Records against other conferences ==
=== FCS conferences ===
Conference	Record
Big Sky	0–0
Big South	2–7
CAA	0–0
Ivy League	0–0
Independents	1–0
MEAC	0–1
MVFC	0–0
NEC	0–0
OVC	3–1
Patriot	0–1
Pioneer	2–0
Southland	0–0
SWAC	0–0
Total	8–10

=== FBS conferences ===
Conference	Record
American	0–1
ACC	0–1
Big 12	0–1
Independents	0–1
MAC	0–2
SEC	0–2
Total	0–8

== Attendance ==
Team	Stadium	Capacity	Game 1	Game 2	Game 3	Game 4	Game 5	Game 6	Game 7	Game 8	Total	Average	% of Capacity
Chattanooga	Finley Stadium	20,668	14,285	8,872	8,848	10,763	9,692				52,460	10,492	51%
The Citadel	Johnson Hagood Stadium	21,000	10,828	8,573	10,467	8,037	11,488	7,638			57,031	9,505	45%
Furman	Paladin Stadium	16,000	7,533	9,789	7,347	8,047	6,282	4,377			43,375	7,229	45%
Mercer	Moye Complex	10,200	10,027	12,227	10,173	8,027	9,277	10,271	10,000		70,002	10,000	98%
Samford	Seibert Stadium	6,700	4,968	4,618	8,713	4,157	4,871	4,689			32,016	5,336	80%
VMI	Alumni Memorial Field	10,000	4,479	4,490	6,624	3,624	7,097				26,314	5,263	53%
Western Carolina	E. J. Whitmire Stadium	13,742	8,929	10,511	7,343	13,323	8,705	8,339			57,150	9,525	69%
Wofford	Gibbs Stadium	13,000	7,392	7,108	9,259	8,010	7,051				38,820	7,764	60%

== NFL draft ==
The following list includes all SoCon players who were drafted in the 2015 NFL draft.

Round #	Pick #	NFL team	Player	Position	College
2	46	San Francisco 49ers	Jaquiski Tartt	S	Samford
5	148	New Orleans Saints	Davis Tull	LB	Chattanooga
