= 2014 VMI Keydets football team =

American college football season

2014 VMI Keydets football
- Conference: Southern Conference
- Record: 2–10 (1–6 SoCon)
- Head coach: Sparky Woods (7th season)
- Offensive coordinator: Matt Campbell (5th season)
- Offensive scheme: Pro-style
- Defensive coordinator: Greg Harris (8th season)
- Base defense: 3–4
- Home stadium: Alumni Memorial Field

2014 Southern Conference football standings
	Conf.			Overall
Team	W		L	W		L
No. 8 Chattanooga $^	7	–	0	10	–	4
Samford	5	–	2	7	–	4
Western Carolina	5	–	2	7	–	5
Wofford	4	–	3	6	–	5
The Citadel	3	–	4	5	–	7
Furman	2	–	5	3	–	9
Mercer	1	–	6	6	–	6
VMI	1	–	6	2	–	10
$ – Conference champion; ^ – FCS playoff participant; Rankings from The Sports Network poll

The 2014 VMI Keydets football team represented the Virginia Military Institute in the 2014 NCAA Division I FCS football season. It was VMI's 124th football season, as the Keydets were led by seventh-year head coach Sparky Woods. They played their home games at 10,000-seat Alumni Memorial Field, as they have since 1962. This was VMI's first season returning to the Southern Conference (SoCon), following an 11-year stint in the Big South Conference.

VMI finished the year with a 2–10 record, winning only two games for the fourth consecutive season. VMI opened the season on the road with a narrow 42–38 loss at Bucknell, followed by a 48–7 defeat at the hands of FBS member Bowling Green. After a dominant win over Davidson in the home opener, the Keydets would lose six consecutive games, including close losses against Mercer and Gardner–Webb in double overtime. Their first (and only) SoCon win came against Furman on November 1, a 31–15 triumph. It was the school's first win over the Paladins since 1979, ending a 21-game losing streak. VMI ended the year with a 45–25 loss to their archrival The Citadel in the Battle for the Silver Shako, otherwise known as the Military Classic of the South.

Less than a day after the season's conclusion, VMI Athletic Director Dave Diles chose not to renew Woods' contract. Woods posted a 17–62 overall record at VMI in seven seasons.

== Schedule ==
Date	Time	Opponent	Site	TV	Result	Attendance
August 30	6:00 pm	at Bucknell*	Christy Mathewson–Memorial Stadium; Lewisburg, PA		L 38–42	3,124
September 6	3:30 pm	at Bowling Green*	Doyt Perry Stadium; Bowling Green, OH	ESPN3	L 7–48	18,311
September 13	1:30 pm	Davidson*	Alumni Memorial Field; Lexington, VA		W 52–24	4,479
September 20	2:00 pm	at Samford	Seibert Stadium; Homewood, AL	ESPN3	L 21–63	4,618
September 27	1:30 pm	Mercer^{†}	Alumni Memorial Field; Lexington, VA		L 24–27	4,490
October 4	4:00 pm	at No. 14 Chattanooga	Finley Stadium; Chattanooga, TN		L 7–55	8,848
October 11	3:30 pm	at Navy*	Navy–Marine Corps Memorial Stadium; Annapolis, MD	CBSSN	L 14–51	33,812
October 18	1:30 pm	Gardner–Webb*	Alumni Memorial Field; Lexington, VA		L 41–47 ^{2OT}	6,624
October 25	1:30 pm	at Wofford	Gibbs Stadium; Spartanburg, SC		L 3–38	8,010
November 1	1:30 pm	Furman	Alumni Memorial Field; Lexington, VA	ESPN3	W 31–15	3,624
November 15	2:00 pm	at Western Carolina	Bob Waters Field at E. J. Whitmire Stadium; Cullowhee, NC		L 27–42	8,339
November 22	1:30 pm	The Citadel	Alumni Memorial Field; Lexington, VA (Military Classic of the South)	ESPN3	L 25–45	7,097
*Non-conference game; ^{†}Homecoming; Rankings from The Sports Network Poll released prior to the game; All times are in Eastern time

== Game summaries ==
=== Bucknell ===
Quarter	1	2	3	4	Total
VMI	0	21	14	3	38
Bucknell	14	14	7	7	42

at Christy Mathewson–Memorial Stadium (Lewisburg, PA)

- Game time: 6:00 PM
- Game weather: 80 degrees, Winds 8 MPH Southeast
- Game attendance: 3,124
- Referee: Henry Wimberg

Despite a spectacular debut from redshirt freshman quarterback Al Cobb, the Keydets fell on the opening week of the season to the Bucknell Bison, 42–38. The game started off poorly for VMI, with Bucknell taking an early 14–0 lead off two touchdowns from Matt DelMauro, including a 56-yard run on the first play of the Bison's second drive. The Keydets quickly responded, however, as Cobb found Doug Burton on a 20-yard touchdown pass. Four minutes later, he connected with Aaron Sanders for 38 yards and another score, promptly tying the game at 14–14. Bucknell immediately responded, as quarterback R.J. Nitti threw to Josh Brake for a fifty-yard score. From there, the two teams would alternate touchdowns, culminating with a one-yard touchdown run from Bucknell's C.J. Williams, putting the home team ahead at halftime 28–21.

The high-scoring pace continued into the third quarter, where Cobb ran in a touchdown from the goal line to tie the game once again. The Bison responded with a quick six play, 75-yard drive ending with a touchdown run by Williams, giving the Bison a 35–28 edge. VMI countered and once again drove the length of the field, finding the endzone with a twenty-yard pass to Dane Forlines. It was Cobb's fifth touchdown of the game, and his fourth through the air. The Keydets then managed to make a stop on defense, but could not advance on third down. Josh Brake of the Bison, who had previously scored a touchdown pass, returned the ensuing punt for 62 yards, giving Bucknell a 42–35 lead, which would hold for the rest of the game. VMI drove down the field in attempt to tie the score, but was stalled in the redzone. Kicker Dillon Christopher connected on a 34-yard field goal, but Bucknell ran out the rest of the clock and went on to win.

Cobb became the fourth player in VMI history to account for thirty or more points in a game, and became the eighth VMI player to throw four or more touchdowns in a single contest. For his performance, he was tabbed as the Southern Conference Freshman of the Week.

=== Bowling Green ===
Quarter	1	2	3	4	Total
VMI	0	7	0	0	7
Bowling Green	14	20	7	7	48

at Doyt Perry Stadium (Bowling Green, OH)

- Game time: 3:30 PM
- Game weather: 73 degrees, Winds 10 MPH
- Game attendance: 18,311
- Referee: Jeff Servinski
- TV: ESPN3

Bowling Green controlled the game from start to finish, sending the Keydets to their second straight loss, 48–7. The Falcons scored on their opening drive with a one-yard run from quarterback James Knapke. Later in the first quarter, VMI allowed another 75-yard punt return for a touchdown, having done so against Bucknell the previous week. Bowling Green quickly found the endzone on their next two possessions, giving them a 28–0 lead with eleven minutes remaining in the first half. However, VMI responded quickly, as Hayden Alford, in replacement of Al Cobb, punched in a touchdown run from the goal line after hitting Doug Burton for a 41-yard pass. It would be the Keydets' only score of the game, and the Falcons countered with a 7-yard touchdown run, courtesy of Travis Greene. The extra point was blocked, however, and Bowling Green settled for a 34–7 halftime lead.

Early in the third quarter, Bowling Green blocked an Alford punt at the 29 yard-line, which was picked up and returned for a score by Herve Coby. Despite this blunder, the Keydet defense played mostly sound in the second half, allowing only one touchdown, a 51-yard score from Knapke to Roger Lewis in the fourth quarter. Cobb played most of the game at quarterback, completing 26 of 43 passes for 224 yards. Alford received considerable time under center as well, throwing for 63 yards himself.

=== Davidson ===
Quarter	1	2	3	4	Total
Davidson	0	3	14	7	24
VMI	14	10	21	7	52

at Alumni Memorial Field (Lexington, VA)

- Game time: 1:30 PM
- Game weather: 73 degrees, Winds 0–5 MPH
- Game attendance: 4,479
- Referee: Ted Pitts

In the home opener of the 2014 season, VMI tallied their highest offensive output since 2008 (a 69–20 win over Chowan) and cruised to a 52–24 victory over Davidson. VMI racked up 597 yards of total offense on the day, 338 of which came from quarterback Al Cobb, who was completed 18 of his 25 pass attempts. Backup quarterback Hayden Alford also received considerable playing time in the second half with the game will in hand, throwing for 56 yards and a touchdown.

The game got off to a good start for the Keydets. After a missed field goal by Dillon Christopher on their first drive, the offense got the ball back and Jabari Turner scored on a 38-yard touchdown run to put VMI ahead early. Later in the first quarter, Turner cashed in a touchdown from the goal line to give VMI a 14–0, and Davidson would get no closer. The two teams then exchanged field goals, and Cobb found Deon Watts in the endzone for a 12-yard score. The Keydets went into halftime ahead 24–3.

Out of the intermission, Davidson came out firing offensively, scoring on a six-play drive in the first two minutes of the half as quarterback J.P. Douglas connected with William Morris for a score. VMI responded immediately, as Turner scored his third touchdown of the day with a two-yard run. Less than a minute later, VMI linebacker Chris Copeland blocked a Davidson punt at the fifteen yard-line, and scooped it up to run it in for a touchdown, putting VMI up 38–10. After another touchdown run by Deon Watts, Davidson countered with a 15-yard touchdown run by David Rogers. Later in the fourth quarter, backup Hayden Alford found Doug Burton for a 26-yard touchdown pass, a drive that spanned 96 yards and took ten plays. The Wildcats scored one final touchdown late in the game on fourth-and-goal, giving the game a final score of 52–24. It was VMI's first Division I non-conference win since a victory over Robert Morris in 2009.

=== Samford ===
Quarter	1	2	3	4	Total
VMI	0	0	7	14	21
Samford	28	21	14	0	63

at Seibert Stadium (Homewood, AL)

- Game time: 2:00 PM
- Game weather: 82 degrees, Winds 7 MPH East
- Game attendance: 4,618
- Referee: Larry Saunders
- TV: ESPN3

Samford dominated the game from the opening kickoff, scoring two touchdowns on their first three plays. Running back Denzel Williams broke free for a 61-yard run on the Bulldogs' second snap of the game, and quarterback Michael Eubank scored a 23-yard touchdown run to put Samford up 14–0. Eubank later found Karel Hamilton for a 25-yard touchdown pass, the only touchdown pass of the entire game for either team. After VMI quarterback Al Cobb was intercepted a second time by Josh Kimberlin, Denzel Williams pounded in a four-yard rushing score to put the Bulldogs up 28–0 just twelve minutes into the game.

The Samford scoring barrage continued into the second quarter, thanks in part to four first-half Keydet turnovers. All three second quarter touchdowns came courtesy of Eubank on the ground, including one with four seconds remaining in the half, putting the game out of reach before the intermission, with Samford holding a comfortable 49–0 lead.

The Bulldogs kept the scoring going early in the third, as Krondis Larry broke open a 68-yard touchdown run. VMI responded, however, with an eight-play, 59-yard drive culminating in a five-yard touchdown run by Jabari Turner to put the Keydets on the board. After another Samford score late in the third, VMI's offense found its rhythm in the fourth quarter, with another touchdown score by Turner, who fought his way through the goal-line scrum, making the score 63–14. Deon Watts ended the scoring on the day with a four-yard run, putting some positives into a poor showing for the Keydet offense and defense. Samford outgained the Keydets on the ground 433–119, and the 63 points were the most the Bulldogs had ever scored against a conference opponent.

=== Mercer ===
Quarter	1	2	3	4	Total
Mercer	7	6	14	0	27
VMI	0	14	3	7	24

at Alumni Memorial Field (Lexington, VA)

- Game time: 1:30 PM
- Game weather: 76 degrees, Winds 3–5 Southeast
- Game attendance: 4,490
- Referee: Steve Marlowe

In a game featuring two first-year SoCon members, Mercer took down VMI 27–24 thanks to a late interception by Bears' safety Zach Jackson.

Mercer got off to an early start thanks to an 18-yard touchdown run by Alex Lakes. The game remained 7–0 throughout most of the first half, until VMI broke through as running back Jabari Turner found the endzone on a one-yard score. Mercer quickly responded, however, as Chandler Curtis broke free for a 23-yard touchdown rush, his only run of the day. Mercer would miss the extra point. On the first play of the next drive, VMI quarterback Al Cobb threw an interception to safety Lendell Arnold. But, on the very next play, Mercer gave the ball right back, as John Russ threw a pick of his own, caught by Damian Jones and returned to the 26-yard line. This turnover set up a VMI scoring drive that culminated with a Cobb touchdown pass to J. C. Garvin, putting the Keydets up 14–13 at halftime.

After receiving the halftime kickoff, Mercer took it right to the Keydets, scoring on an eight-play, 75-yard drive with Alex Lakes finding the endzone. After a VMI punt, Russ found Curtis streaking down the field for a 62-yard touchdown pass, giving Mercer a 27–14 lead. Later in the quarter, Keydets' kicker Dillon Christopher nailed a 49-yard field goal attempt, and the two teams would play in a stalemate for much of the final twenty minutes.

With over 6:30 minutes remaining in the fourth quarter, Cobb manufactured another scoring drive and hit wide receiver Sam Patterson in the endzone for 28 yards. Immediately VMI forced a punt, and began their final drive at their own thirteen yard-line. After several completions, short runs, and a facemask penalty committed by Mercer, VMI found themselves on the Bears' 39-yard line. Cobb then decided to throw a ball towards the endzone for receiver Doug Burton, but the pass was picked off by Zach Jackson, securing a 27–24 win for Mercer, their first Southern Conference win.

=== Chattanooga ===
Quarter	1	2	3	4	Total
VMI	0	0	0	7	7
#14 Chattanooga	7	27	14	7	55

at Finley Stadium (Chattanooga, TN)

- Game time: 4:00 PM
- Game weather: 60 degrees, Winds 17 MPH West
- Game attendance: 8,848
- Referee: Marshall Lewis

After a close first quarter, Chattanooga broke open the game with four touchdowns in the second, all scored by Mocs' quarterback Jacob Huesman. After running for a score, Huesman connected with C.J. Board and Faysal Shafaat twice to give Chattanooga a 34–0 lead at the half. VMI did block an extra point, doing so for a second consecutive game.

Huesman continued his stupendous effort in the third quarter, running for a 44-yard touchdown score on the first drive. The Mocs backup quarterback, Alejandro Bennifield, then came into the game and threw for a touchdown pass. VMI salvaged a touchdown on their final drive of the game, a one-yard scramble by backup quarterback Hayden Alford. The Keydets netted only 53 rushing yards and had only nine first downs.

=== Navy ===
Quarter	1	2	3	4	Total
VMI	0	7	0	7	14
Navy	14	23	7	7	51

at Navy–Marine Corps Memorial Stadium (Annapolis, MD)

- Game time: 3:30 PM
- Game weather: 54 degrees, Winds 7 MPH Northeast
- Game attendance: 33,812
- Referee: Todd LaPenta
- TV: CBS Sports Network

VMI returned to Navy–Marine Corps Memorial Stadium for the second time in three years, the first contest being played in 2012, a 41–3 loss to the Midshipmen. Navy got off to a quick start with a 64-yard run by Noah Copeland on the Midshipmen's third play of the game. Later in the second quarter, with Navy up 14–0, nosetackle Joe Nelson forced a fumble by Navy quarterback Tago Smith, which, after bouncing off several defends, was recovered in the endzone by Damian Jones for a VMI touchdown. On their next drive, VMI was forced to punt, and a high snap over the head of Hayden Alford caused a safety. The Midshipmen scored on the following possession with a 14-yard run by Q Singleton. Parrish Gaines then intercepted a pass by Al Cobb and returned it for a touchdown, and a short punt led to another Midshipmen score, putting Navy up at halftime 37–7.

The scoring settled down in the second half. Tago Smith found the endzone on a 2-yard run late in the third quarter, and running back Will Worth scored later in the fourth. VMI managed to get the last score of the game, as Cobb engineered a 10-play, 65-yard drive that culminated with a touchdown pass to Chad Jacob. Although VMI passed for over 200 yards to Navy's 82, the Midshipmen outgained the Keydets on the ground by almost 300 yards, and gave up 434 yards of total offense.

=== Gardner–Webb ===
Quarter	1	2	3	4	OT	2OT	Total
Gardner–Webb	14	7	10	3	7	6	47
VMI	0	13	0	21	7	0	41

at Alumni Memorial Field (Lexington, VA)

- Game time: 1:30 PM
- Game weather: 57 degrees, Winds 9–15 MPH
- Game attendance: 6,624
- Referee: Lee Hedrick

A common theme in 2014, VMI got off to a slow start, allowing Gardner–Webb to score two early touchdowns off passes by quarterback Lucas Beatty. VMI rebounded in the second quarter, as Al Cobb found Matthew Nicholson for a 19-yard score. Dillon Christopher missed the extra point, which proved to be critical later in the game. After the Runnin' Bulldogs responded with a touchdown, VMI countered with a late-first half drive that culminated with a 22-yard touchdown pass from Cobb to receiver Doug Burton, cutting Gardner–Webb's lead to 21–13 at the half.

The Bulldogs reclaimed momentum in the third quarter, as Beatty found All-Conference selection Kenny Cook for an 80-yard score. A 26-yard field goal later in the quarter by Paul Schumacher put GWU up by three scores, 31–13. The Keydets responded in the fourth, as Cobb found tight end Kyle Vardo in the endzone, cutting the lead to 31–20. After making a stop on defense, sophomore receiver Dane Forlines caught a pass for a 12-yard score, but the two-point conversion attempt was failed. Immediately on the first play of the ensuing Gardner–Webb possession, Beatty lobbed a pass down field that was picked off by freshman Greg Sanders. With excellent field position, VMI worked a four-play drive that ended with a touchdown on fourth down to Deon Watts. The two-point conversion pass to Forlines was caught, and VMI had their first lead of the day at 34–31.

In the final drive of regulation, Gardner–Webb worked their way to the VMI 38-yard line, Beatty was sacked for a loss of ten yards by Doug Moore. On fourth and twenty, Beatty connected with Mike Estes for a first down, setting up a 43-yard field goal by Schumacher, sending the game into overtime tied at 34.

VMI elected to go on defense first after winning the coin toss. After a 23-yard pass to Cook on the first play of overtime, running back J.J. Hubbard found the endzone to put the Bulldogs up. Immediately, VMI countered with a 25-yard pass from Cobb to Aaron Sanders on their first snap of overtime. It was Cobb's sixth touchdown pass of the game, a VMI record, and all six touchdowns were to different receivers. However, kicker Dillon Christopher missed a field goal on VMI's next possession, and Gardner–Webb scored on the very next play with a pass to Cook, escaping Lexington with a 47–41 win.

=== Wofford ===
Quarter	1	2	3	4	Total
VMI	0	3	0	0	3
Wofford	14	10	7	7	38

at Gibbs Stadium (Spartanburg, SC)

- Game time: 1:30 PM
- Game weather: 70 degrees, Winds 2 MPH West-southwest
- Game attendance: 8,010
- Referee: Larry Saunders

=== Furman ===
Quarter	1	2	3	4	Total
Furman	0	0	7	8	15
VMI	3	14	7	7	31

at Alumni Memorial Field (Lexington, VA)

- Game time: 1:30 PM
- Game weather: 50 degrees, overcast, winds 10–12 MPH West
- Game attendance: 3,624
- Referee: Ted Pitts
- TV: ESPN3

=== Western Carolina ===
Quarter	1	2	3	4	Total
VMI	0	10	10	7	27
Western Carolina	14	14	7	7	42

at E. J. Whitmire Stadium (Cullowhee, NC)

- Game time: 2:00 PM
- Game weather: 40 degrees, Winds 5 MPH South-southeast
- Game attendance: 8,339
- Referee: Thomas Graham

=== The Citadel ===
Quarter	1	2	3	4	Total
The Citadel	7	17	21	0	45
VMI	0	13	6	6	25

at Alumni Memorial Field (Lexington, VA)

- Game time: 1:30 PM
- Game weather: 48 degrees, Winds 3–7 MPH
- Game attendance: 7,097
- Referee: Marshall Lewis
- TV: ESPN3

== Personnel ==
=== Coaching staff ===
VMI returns head coach Sparky Woods, now in his seventh year with the program. Woods, a native of Oneida, Tennessee, has a 15–52 record at VMI, and previously coached at Appalachian State for four seasons. He led the Mountaineers to NCAA playoff appearances in 1986 and 1987, and went as far as the semifinals. He has also coached at South Carolina, and served numerous stints as an assistant between various college and NFL teams.

Coordinating the offense is Matt Campbell, a former NFL player who played with the Carolina Panthers and Washington Redskins in the late 1990s and early 2000s. Campbell also works as the offensive line coach, and is countered by defensive coordinator Greg Harris, in his eighth year with the team. Harris is a 1997 graduate of VMI.

Name	Position	Seasons at VMI	Alma mater
Sparky Woods	Head coach	7th	Carson-Newman (1976)
Matt Campbell	Offensive coordinator, Offensive Line	5th	USC-Beaufort (2009)
Greg Harris	Defensive coordinator	8th	Virginia Military Institute (1997)
Ron Mattes	Tight Ends	1st	Virginia (1985)
Eric Brown	Inside Linebackers	4th	South Carolina (1993)
Justin Hamilton	Outside Linebackers	1st	Virginia Tech
Brad Robbins	Wide Receivers	2nd	UVA–Wise (2010)
Greg Shockley	Running Backs	10th	Virginia Tech (1999)
Trent Walker	Secondary	4th	Auburn (2009)
Don Woods	Defensive Line	7th	Tennessee Tech (1969)
Jimmy Whitten	Strength & Conditioning	11th	Virginia Tech (1991)

=== Roster ===
2014 VMI Keydets football team roster
Players
Coaches
Offense

Pos.	#	Name	Class
TB	2	Deon Watts	Sr
QB	4	John Burton	So
WR	6	Dane Forlines	So
QB	8	Al Cobb	Fr
WR	11	Darrian Johnson	So
QB/P	12	Hayden Alford	So
QB	13	Ryan Swingle	Fr
WR	15	Joey Brown	Fr
QB	16	Jade Maher	Fr
WR	17	Brice Tucker	Fr
WR	18	Doug Burton	Sr
RB	21	Jabari Turner	Sr
RB	22	Taylor Stout	So
RB	23	Cody Shirley	So
WR	29	Zach Jones	Jr
RB	39	Derrick Ziglar	Jr
RB	40	Hunter Marshall	Fr
WR	43	Kyle Harrell	Fr
WR	48	John Wilkins	So
RB	49	Kyle Vardo	Fr
OL	50	Chase Smith	Fr
C/LS	57	Bradley Hann	So
OL	60	Kurt Odegaard	Fr
OL	61	Stephen Miller	Fr
C	62	Patrick Doucette	Fr
G	63	Nate Murray	Jr
OL	65	Matt Milner	Fr
G	66	Iyan Roseborough	So
OL	68	Corey Atkins	Fr
OL	69	Joe Kluckowski	So
OT	70	Emmanuel Cooper	Sr
OT	71	Jordan Veal	So
OT	75	Andy Marcotte	Sr
OL	77	Bradley Brown	Fr
G	78	Chad Reed	So
WR	80	Samuel Patterson	Jr
TE	81	Chad Jacob	So
WR	82	Matthew Nicholson	So
TE	83	Christian Williams	Fr
WR	84	Calvin Michie	So
WR	85	Aaron Sanders	So
TE	86	John Mobley	Fr
TE	88	J.C. Garvin	So
TE	89	Andrew Lewis	So

Defense

Pos.	#	Name	Class
DB	1	Eric Johnson	So
DB	3	Caleb Furlow	Sr
LB	5	Darnell Ashton	So
CB	7	Damian Jones	So
CB	9	James Fruehan	Sr
S	14	Greg Sanders	Fr
CB	19	Doug Moore	Jr
S	20	Alex James	Jr
DB	24	Chap Michie	Jr
S	3	Alex Keys	So
LB	26	Bradley Lipscomb	So
CB	28	Brendon Bock	Jr
DB	30	Gabe Sutherland	Fr
LB	31	Travis Hawkins	Jr
DB	32	John Strozyk	Fr
DB	33	Paul Conteh	Fr
LB/P	34	Bill Hogan	Fr
DB	35	Scott Frazier	Fr
DB	36	Michael Williams	Fr
LB	37	Dakota Nicely	Jr
S	38	Alijah Robinson	So
LB	41	Logan Staib	Sr
LB	42	Tony Richardson	Fr
LB	44	Ryan Francis	Fr
LB	45	Miller Williams	Sr
LB	46	Allan Cratsenberg	Fr
LB	47	Caleb Lindsay	Jr
DE	52	Zack Baker	Fr
LB	53	Troy Barden	Fr
DL	55	Daniel Raider	Fr
LB	56	Brian Ellis	So
LB	59	Chris Copeland	Jr
DL	72	Noah Bryson	Fr
DL	73	Connor Mildrum	So
LB	87	Brian Lipscomb	Fr
DE	90	Robert de Wolff	So
DL	91	Xavier Greenfield	Fr
DT	92	Walker Hays	So
DE	93	Denton Ensminger	Jr
DL	94	Amon-Ra Clay	Fr
DL	95	Shavon Henderson	Fr
DL	96	Seth Mallory	So
DE	97	John Washington	Sr
DE	98	Devin Johnson	Fr
DT	99	Joe Nelson	So

Special teams

Pos.	#	Name	Class
PK	27	Dillon Christopher	So
PK	67	Seth Hinton	Fr
PK	74	Sam Reiner	Fr
PK	76	Chase Jones	Fr

Head coach

- Sparky Woods – 7th year

Coordinators/assistant coaches

- Matt Campbell (Offensive Coordinator/Offensive Line) – 5th year
- Greg Harris (Defensive Coordinator) – 8th year
- Ron Mattes (Tight Ends) – 1st year
- Eric Brown (Inside Linebackers) – 4th year
- Justin Hamilton (Outside Linebackers) – 1st year
- Brad Robbins (Wide Receivers) – 2nd year
- Greg Shockley (Running Backs) – 10th year
- Trent Walker (Secondary) – 4th year
- Don Woods (Defensive Line) – 7th year
- Jimmy Whitten (Strength & Conditioning) – 11th year

Legend

- (C) Team captain
- (S) Suspended
- (I) Ineligible
- Injured
- Redshirt

Roster

=== Returning starters ===
==== Offense ====
Player	Class	Position
Doug Burton	R–Senior	Wide Receiver
Sam Patterson	Junior	Wide Receiver
Nate Murray	R–Junior	Offensive Line
Emmanuel Cooper	Senior	Offensive Line
Andy Marcotte	R–Senior	Offensive Line
Derrick Ziglar	R–Junior	Running Back

==== Defense ====
Player	Class	Position
John Washington	R–Senior	Defensive Line
Joe Nelson	R–Sophomore	Defensive Line
Logan Staib	R–Senior	Linebacker
James Fruehan	Senior	Defensive Back
Caleb Furlow	Senior	Defensive Back
Alex James	Junior	Defensive Back
Damian Jones	R–Sophomore	Defensive Back

==== Special teams ====
Player	Class	Position
Dillon Christopher	Sophomore	Placekicker
Hayden Alford	R–Sophomore	Punter
Bradley Hann	R–Sophomore	Longsnapper
Dane Forlines	Sophomore	Punt returner
Taylor Stout; Dane Forlines	Sophomore; Sophomore	Kick returner
