= Diles =

Diles is a surname. Notable people with the surname include:

- Arthur Diles (born 1982), Australian soccer player and manager
- Dave Diles (1931–2009), American sports broadcaster, journalist, and author
- Dave Diles Jr. (born 1962), American athletic director
- Zac Diles (born 1985), American football linebacker
