= 2014 Western Carolina Catamounts football team =

American college football season

2014 Western Carolina Catamounts football
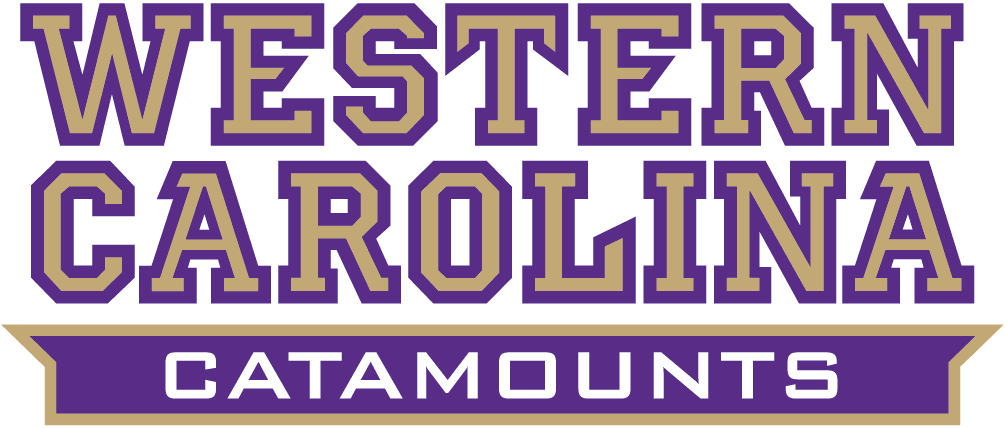
- Conference: Southern Conference
- Record: 7–5 (5–2 SoCon)
- Head coach: Mark Speir (3rd season)
- Offensive coordinator: Brad Glenn (3rd season)
- Defensive coordinator: Shawn Quinn (2nd season)
- Home stadium: Bob Waters Field at E. J. Whitmire Stadium

2014 Southern Conference football standings
	Conf.			Overall
Team	W		L	W		L
No. 8 Chattanooga $^	7	–	0	10	–	4
Samford	5	–	2	7	–	4
Western Carolina	5	–	2	7	–	5
Wofford	4	–	3	6	–	5
The Citadel	3	–	4	5	–	7
Furman	2	–	5	3	–	9
Mercer	1	–	6	6	–	6
VMI	1	–	6	2	–	10
$ – Conference champion; ^ – FCS playoff participant; Rankings from The Sports Network Poll

The 2014 Western Carolina Catamounts team represented Western Carolina University as a member of the Southern Conference (SoCon) during the 2014 NCAA Division I FCS football season. Led by third-year head coach Mark Speir, the Catamounts compiled an overall record of 7–5 with a mark of 5–2 in conference play, tying for second place in the SoCon. Western Carolina played home games at Bob Waters Field at E. J. Whitmire Stadium in Cullowhee, North Carolina.

== Schedule ==
Date	Time	Opponent	Site	TV	Result	Attendance
August 30	7:00 pm	at South Florida*	Raymond James Stadium; Tampa, FL	ESPN3	L 31–36	31,642
September 6	3:30 pm	Brevard*	Bob Waters Field at E. J. Whitmire Stadium; Cullowhee, NC	SDN	W 45–21	8,929
September 13	3:30 pm	Catawba*	Bob Waters Field at E. J. Whitmire Stadium; Cullowhee, NC	SDN	W 35–17	10,511
September 27	3:30 pm	at Furman	Paladin Stadium; Greenville, SC	ASN	W 35–17	9,789
October 4	2:00 pm	at Presbyterian*	Bailey Memorial Stadium; Clinton, SC		L 14–19	4,007
October 11	3:30 pm	Wofford	Bob Waters Field at E. J. Whitmire Stadium; Cullowhee, NC	ESPN3	W 26–14	7,343
October 18	4:00 pm	at Mercer	Moye Complex; Macon, GA	ESPN3	W 35–21	9,277
October 25	2:00 pm	The Citadel^{†}	Bob Waters Field at E. J. Whitmire Stadium; Cullowhee, NC	SDN	W 29–15	13,323
November 1	2:00 pm	No. 14 Chattanooga	Bob Waters Field at E. J. Whitmire Stadium; Cullowhee, NC	SDN	L 0–51	8,705
November 8	2:30 pm	at Samford	Seibert Stadium; Birmingham, AL	ASN	L 20–34	4,689
November 15	2:00 pm	VMI	Bob Waters Field at E. J. Whitmire Stadium; Cullowhee, NC	SDN	W 42–27	8,339
November 22	4:00 pm	at No. 1 (FBS) Alabama*	Bryant–Denny Stadium; Tuscaloosa, AL	SECN	L 14–48	101,325
*Non-conference game; ^{†}Homecoming; Rankings from The Sports Network Poll released prior to the game; All times are in Eastern time
