= 2014 Chattanooga Mocs football team =

American college football season

2014 Chattanooga Mocs football

SoCon champion

NCAA Division I Quarterfinal, L 30–35 vs. New Hampshire
- Conference: Southern Conference

Ranking
- Sports Network: No. 8
- FCS Coaches: No. 8
- Record: 10–4 (7–0 SoCon)
- Head coach: Russ Huesman (6th season)
- Offensive coordinator: Jeff Durden (2nd season)
- Defensive coordinator: Adam Braithwaite (2nd season)
- Home stadium: Finley Stadium

2014 Southern Conference football standings
	Conf.			Overall
Team	W		L	W		L
No. 8 Chattanooga $^	7	–	0	10	–	4
Samford	5	–	2	7	–	4
Western Carolina	5	–	2	7	–	5
Wofford	4	–	3	6	–	5
The Citadel	3	–	4	5	–	7
Furman	2	–	5	3	–	9
Mercer	1	–	6	6	–	6
VMI	1	–	6	2	–	10
$ – Conference champion; ^ – FCS playoff participant; Rankings from The Sports Network Poll

The 2014 Chattanooga Mocs football team represented the University of Tennessee at Chattanooga in the 2014 NCAA Division I FCS football season as a member of the Southern Conference (SoCon). The Mocs were led by sixth-year head coach Russ Huesman and played their home games at Finley Stadium in Chattanooga, Tennessee. 2014 was a historic season for the Mocs. The Mocs won ten games in a season for the first time in program history, won the SoCon Conference outright for the first time in program history, went undefeated in the SoCon for the first time in program history, and went to the postseason for the first time since 1984, netting a number eight seed and a first-round bye. Chattanooga beat Indiana State at home for the program's first-ever home playoff win in the Second Round of the NCAA Division I Football Championship playoffs before falling to New Hampshire, 35–30, in the Quarterfinal.

== Schedule ==
Date	Time	Opponent	Rank	Site	TV	Result	Attendance
August 28	7:00 pm	at Central Michigan*	No. 14	Kelly/Shorts Stadium; Mount Pleasant, MI	ESPN3	L 16–20	15,793
September 6	6:00 pm	No. 9 Jacksonville State*	No. 13	Finley Stadium; Chattanooga, TN		L 23–26 ^{OT}	14,285
September 13	5:00 pm	at Austin Peay*	No. 14	Governors Stadium; Clarksville, TN		W 42–6	6,883
September 27	7:00 pm	Samford	No. 14	Finley Stadium; Chattanooga, TN	ASN	W 38–24	8,872
October 4	4:00 pm	VMI^{†}	No. 14	Finley Stadium; Chattanooga, TN		W 55–7	8,848
October 11	4:00 pm	at Tennessee*	No. 13	Neyland Stadium; Knoxville, TN	SECN	L 10–45	93,097
October 18	12:00 pm	at The Citadel	No. 17	Johnson Hagood Stadium; Charleston, SC	ASN	W 34–14	8,037
October 25	12:00 pm	Mercer	No. 15	Finley Stadium; Chattanooga, TN	ASN	W 38–31	10,763
November 1	2:00 pm	at Western Carolina	No. 14	Bob Waters Field at E. J. Whitmire Stadium; Cullowhee, NC	SDN	W 51–0	8,705
November 8	1:00 pm	Wofford	No. 13	Finley Stadium; Chattanooga, TN	ESPN3	W 31–13	9,692
November 15	2:30 pm	at Tennessee Tech*	No. 9	Tucker Stadium; Cookeville, TN		W 38–17	4,009
November 22	3:30 pm	at Furman	No. 9	Paladin Stadium; Greenville, SC	ASN	W 45–19	4,377
December 6	1:00 pm	No. 25 Indiana State*	No. 8	Finley Stadium; Chattanooga, TN (NCAA Division I Second Round)	ESPN3	W 35–14	8,419
December 12	8:00 pm	at No. 1 New Hampshire*	No. 8	Cowell Stadium; Durham, NH (NCAA Division I Quarterfinal)	ESPN2	L 30–35	6,380
*Non-conference game; ^{†}Homecoming; Rankings from The Sports Network Poll released prior to the game; All times are in Eastern time

== Ranking movements ==
Ranking movements Legend: ██ Increase in ranking ██ Decrease in ranking
	Week														
Poll	Pre	1	2	3	4	5	6	7	8	9	10	11	12	13	Final
Sports Network	14	13	14	15	14	14	13	17	15	14	13	9	9	8	8
Coaches	16	15	17	14	15	14	12	15	14	12	11	9	9	8	8

== NFL draft ==
Year	Round	Overall	Player	Team	Position
2015	5	148	Davis Tull	New Orleans Saints	OLB
