= 2014 Samford Bulldogs football team =

American college football season

2014 Samford Bulldogs football
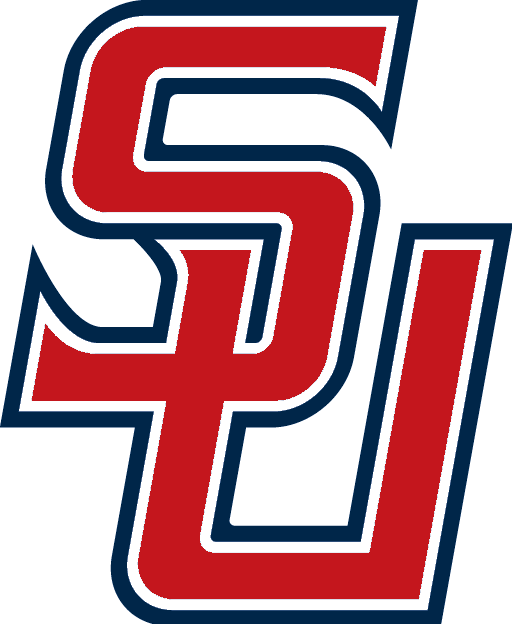
- Conference: Southern Conference
- Record: 7–4 (5–2 SoCon)
- Head coach: Pat Sullivan (8th season)
- Offensive coordinator: Travis Trickett (3rd season)
- Defensive coordinator: Bill D'Ottavio (8th season)
- Home stadium: Seibert Stadium

2014 Southern Conference football standings
| | Conf. | | | Overall |
| Team | W | | L | W | | L |
|---|---|---|---|---|---|---|
| No. 8 Chattanooga $^ | 7 | – | 0 | 10 | – | 4 |
| Samford | 5 | – | 2 | 7 | – | 4 |
| Western Carolina | 5 | – | 2 | 7 | – | 5 |
| Wofford | 4 | – | 3 | 6 | – | 5 |
| The Citadel | 3 | – | 4 | 5 | – | 7 |
| Furman | 2 | – | 5 | 3 | – | 9 |
| Mercer | 1 | – | 6 | 6 | – | 6 |
| VMI | 1 | – | 6 | 2 | – | 10 |
$ – Conference champion; ^ – FCS playoff participant; Rankings from The Sports Network Poll

The 2014 Samford Bulldogs football team represented Samford University in the 2014 NCAA Division I FCS football season. Led by eighth-year head coach Pat Sullivan, they played their home games at Seibert Stadium and were a member of the Southern Conference. The team finished the season with a 7–4 overall record, including a 5–2 mark in SoCon play, securing a tie for second place.

On December 2, head coach Pat Sullivan stepped down. He finished at Samford with an eight year record of 47–43.

== Schedule ==
| Date | Time | Opponent | Site | TV | Result | Attendance |
|---|---|---|---|---|---|---|
| August 30 | 6:00 pm | at TCU* | Amon G. Carter Stadium; Fort Worth, TX | FCS | L 14–48 | 40,094 |
| September 11 | 6:30 pm | Stillman* | Seibert Stadium; Homewood, AL | | W 52–0 | 4,968 |
| September 20 | 2:00 pm | VMI | Seibert Stadium; Homewood, AL | ESPN3 | W 63–21 | 4,618 |
| September 27 | 6:00 pm | at No. 14 Chattanooga | Finley Stadium; Chattanooga, TN | ASN | L 24–38 | 8,872 |
| October 4 | 2:00 pm | Mercer | Seibert Stadium; Homewood, AL | | W 21–18 | 8,713 |
| October 18 | 2:00 pm | Wofford | Seibert Stadium; Homewood, AL | | L 20–24 | 4,157 |
| October 25 | 12:30 pm | at Furman | Paladin Stadium; Greenville, SC | ESPN3 | W 45–0 | 8,047 |
| November 1 | 2:00 pm | Concordia*^{†} | Seibert Stadium; Homewood, AL | | W 55–0 | 4,871 |
| November 8 | 2:30 pm | Western Carolina | Seibert Stadium; Homewood, AL | ASN | W 34–20 | 4,689 |
| November 15 | 12:00 pm | at The Citadel | Johnson Hagood Stadium; Charleston, SC | | W 20–17 | 7,638 |
| November 22 | 6:00 pm | at No. 16 (FBS) Auburn* | Jordan–Hare Stadium; Auburn, AL | ESPNU | L 7–31 | 87,451 |
*Non-conference game; ^{†}Homecoming; Rankings from The Sports Network Poll released prior to the game; All times are in Central time

== Game summaries ==
=== @ TCU ===
Samford @ TCU

| Team | 1 | 2 | 3 | 4 | Total |
|---|---|---|---|---|---|
| Bulldogs | 0 | 7 | 0 | 7 | 14 |
| • Horned Frogs | 14 | 10 | 10 | 14 | 48 |

- Date: August 30
- Location: Amon G. Carter Stadium
  Fort Worth, TX
- Game start: 6:00 PM CDT
- Game attendance: 40,094
- Television network: FCSC

In their first game of the season, the Bulldogs lost, 48–14 to the TCU Horned Frogs.

=== Stillman ===
Stillman @ Samford

| Team | 1 | 2 | 3 | 4 | Total |
|---|---|---|---|---|---|
| Tigers | 0 | 0 | 0 | 0 | 0 |
| • Bulldogs | 14 | 21 | 14 | 3 | 52 |

- Date: September 11
- Location: Seibert Stadium
  Homewood, AL
- Game start: 6:30 PM CDT
- Game attendance: 4,968

In their second game of the season, the Bulldogs won, 52–0 over the Stillman Tigers.

=== VMI ===
VMI @ Samford

| Team | 1 | 2 | 3 | 4 | Total |
|---|---|---|---|---|---|
| Keydets | 0 | 0 | 7 | 14 | 21 |
| • Bulldogs | 28 | 21 | 14 | 0 | 63 |

- Date: September 20
- Location: Seibert Stadium
  Homewood, AL
- Game start: 2:00 PM CDT
- Game attendance: 4,618
- Television network: ESPN3

In their third game of the season, the Bulldogs won, 63–21 over the VMI Keydets.

=== @ Chattanooga ===
Samford @ Chattanooga

| Team | 1 | 2 | 3 | 4 | Total |
|---|---|---|---|---|---|
| Bulldogs | 3 | 0 | 14 | 7 | 24 |
| • #14 Mocs | 17 | 7 | 0 | 14 | 38 |

- Date: September 27
- Location: Finley Stadium
  Chattanooga, TN
- Game start: 6:00 PM CDT
- Game attendance: 8,872
- Television network: ASN

In their fourth game of the season, the Bulldogs lost, 38–24 to the Chattanooga Mocs.

=== Mercer ===
Mercer @ Samford

| Team | 1 | 2 | 3 | 4 | Total |
|---|---|---|---|---|---|
| Bears | 3 | 7 | 0 | 8 | 18 |
| • Bulldogs | 7 | 7 | 7 | 0 | 21 |

- Date: October 4
- Location: Seibert Stadium
  Homewood, AL
- Game start: 2:00 PM CDT
- Game attendance: 8,713

In their fifth game of the season, the Bulldogs won, 21–18 over the Mercer Bears.

=== Wofford ===
Wofford @ Samford

| Team | 1 | 2 | 3 | 4 | Total |
|---|---|---|---|---|---|
| • Terriers | 10 | 0 | 7 | 7 | 24 |
| Bulldogs | 0 | 10 | 7 | 3 | 20 |

- Date: October 18
- Location: Seibert Stadium
  Homewood, AL
- Game start: 2:00 PM CDT
- Game attendance: 4,157

In their sixth game of the season, the Bulldogs lost, 24–20 to the Wofford Terriers.

=== @ Furman ===
Samford @ Furman

| Team | 1 | 2 | 3 | 4 | Total |
|---|---|---|---|---|---|
| • Bulldogs | 21 | 14 | 0 | 10 | 45 |
| Paladins | 0 | 0 | 0 | 0 | 0 |

- Date: October 25
- Location: Paladin Stadium
  Greenville, SC
- Game start: 12:30 PM CDT
- Game attendance: 8,047.
- Television network: ESPN3

In their seventh game of the season, the Bulldogs won, 45–0 over the Furman Paladins.

=== Concordia ===
Concordia @ Samford

| Team | 1 | 2 | 3 | 4 | Total |
|---|---|---|---|---|---|
| Hornets | 0 | 0 | 0 | 0 | 0 |
| • Bulldogs | 21 | 10 | 14 | 10 | 55 |

- Date: November 1
- Location: Seibert Stadium
  Homewood, AL
- Game start: 2:00 PM CDT
- Game attendance: 4,871

In their eighth game of the season, the Bulldogs won, 55–0 over the Concordia Hornets.

=== Western Carolina ===
Western Carolina @ Samford

| Team | 1 | 2 | 3 | 4 | Total |
|---|---|---|---|---|---|
| Catamounts | 0 | 7 | 6 | 7 | 20 |
| • Bulldogs | 14 | 14 | 3 | 3 | 34 |

- Date: November 8
- Location: Seibert Stadium
  Homewood, AL
- Game start: 2:30 PM CST
- Game attendance: 4,689
- Television network: ASN

In their ninth game of the season, the Bulldogs won, 34–20 over the Western Carolina Catamounts.

=== @ The Citadel ===
Samford @ The Citadel

| Team | 1 | 2 | 3 | 4 | Total |
|---|---|---|---|---|---|
| • Samford | 0 | 7 | 0 | 13 | 20 |
| The Citadel | 0 | 0 | 7 | 10 | 17 |

- Date: November 15
- Location: Johnson Hagood Stadium
  Charleston, SC
- Game start: 12:00 PM CST
- Game attendance: 7,638

In their tenth game of the season, the Bulldogs won, 20–17 over The Citadel Bulldogs.

=== @ Auburn ===
Samford @ Auburn

| Team | 1 | 2 | 3 | 4 | Total |
|---|---|---|---|---|---|
| Bulldogs | 0 | 7 | 0 | 0 | 7 |
| • #16 Tigers | 0 | 17 | 7 | 7 | 31 |

- Date: November 22
- Location: Jordan–Hare Stadium
  Auburn, AL
- Game start: 6:00 PM CST
- Game attendance: 87,451
- Television network: ESPNU

In their eleventh game of the season, the Bulldogs lost, 31–7 to the Auburn Tigers.
