= 2014 Mercer Bears football team =

American college football season

2014 Mercer Bears football
- Conference: Southern Conference
- Record: 6–6 (1–6 SoCon)
- Head coach: Bobby Lamb (2nd season)
- Offensive coordinator: Casey Vogt (2nd season)
- Defensive coordinator: Mike Kolakowski (2nd season)
- Home stadium: Moye Complex

2014 Southern Conference football standings
	Conf.			Overall
Team	W		L	W		L
No. 8 Chattanooga $^	7	–	0	10	–	4
Samford	5	–	2	7	–	4
Western Carolina	5	–	2	7	–	5
Wofford	4	–	3	6	–	5
The Citadel	3	–	4	5	–	7
Furman	2	–	5	3	–	9
Mercer	1	–	6	6	–	6
VMI	1	–	6	2	–	10
$ – Conference champion; ^ – FCS playoff participant; Rankings from The Sports Network Poll

The 2014 Mercer Bears football team represented Mercer University in the 2014 NCAA Division I FCS football season. They were led by second-year head coach Bobby Lamb and played their home games at the Moye Complex. They were first-year members of the Southern Conference (SoCon). They finished the season 6–6 overall and 1–6 in SoCon play to tie for seventh place.

== Schedule ==
Date	Time	Opponent	Site	TV	Result	Attendance
August 28	7:00 pm	Reinhardt*	Moye Complex; Macon, GA	ESPN3	W 45–42	10,027
September 6	6:00 pm	No. 19 Furman	Moye Complex; Macon, GA	ESPN3	L 20–25	12,227
September 13	6:00 pm	at Stetson*	Spec Martin Stadium; DeLand, FL		W 49–0	3,660
September 20	6:00 pm	Ave Maria*	Moye Complex; Macon, GA	ESPN3	W 42–21	10,173
September 27	1:30 pm	at VMI	Alumni Memorial Field; Lexington, VA		W 27–24	4,490
October 4	3:00 pm	at Samford	Seibert Stadium; Homewood, AL		L 18–21	8,713
October 11	4:00 pm	Austin Peay*	Moye Complex; Macon, GA	ESPN3	W 49–31	8,027
October 18	4:00 pm	Western Carolina	Moye Complex; Macon, GA	ESPN3	L 21–35	9,277
October 25	12:00 pm	at No. 15 Chattanooga	Finley Stadium; Chattanooga, TN	ASN	L 31–38	10,763
November 1	4:00 pm	The Citadel^{†}	Moye Complex; Macon, GA	ESPN3	L 26–28	10,271
November 15	4:00 pm	Warner*	Moye Complex; Macon, GA	ESPN3	W 56–0	10,000
November 22	1:30 pm	at Wofford	Gibbs Stadium; Spartanburg, SC		L 6–34	7,051
*Non-conference game; ^{†}Homecoming; Rankings from The Sports Network FCS Poll released prior to the game; All times are in Eastern time

The ASN game aired locally on WMUB.

== Awards ==
- 2014 CFPA FCS National Return Specialist of the Year

Chandler Curtis

=== Honors ===
==== All-America ====
- Second Team

Chandler Curtis

==== All-SoCon ====
The Mercer University football team had seven individuals honored by the Southern Conference:

- First Team

Chandler Curtis
Alex Lakes

- Second Team

Wilson Heres
Alex Avant
Tyler Ward

- All-Freshman

Chandler Curtis
Alex Lakes
Austin Barrett
Kyle Williams
