= 2014 Wofford Terriers football team =

American college football season

2014 Wofford Terriers football
- Conference: Southern Conference
- Record: 6–5 (4–3 SoCon)
- Head coach: Mike Ayers (27th season)
- Offensive coordinator: Wade Long
- Defensive coordinator: Nathan Fuqua
- Home stadium: Gibbs Stadium

2014 Southern Conference football standings
	Conf.			Overall
Team	W		L	W		L
No. 8 Chattanooga $^	7	–	0	10	–	4
Samford	5	–	2	7	–	4
Western Carolina	5	–	2	7	–	5
Wofford	4	–	3	6	–	5
The Citadel	3	–	4	5	–	7
Furman	2	–	5	3	–	9
Mercer	1	–	6	6	–	6
VMI	1	–	6	2	–	10
$ – Conference champion; ^ – FCS playoff participant; Rankings from The Sports Network Poll

The 2014 Wofford Terriers football team represented Wofford College in the 2014 NCAA Division I FCS football season. They were led by 27th-year head coach Mike Ayers and played their home games at Gibbs Stadium. They were a member of the Southern Conference. They finished the season 6–5, 4–3 in SoCon play to finish in fourth place.

== Schedule ==
Date	Time	Opponent	Site	TV	Result	Attendance
August 30	12:30 pm	at Georgia Tech*	Bobby Dodd Stadium; Atlanta, GA	ACCRSN	L 19–38	45,403
September 13	7:00 pm	North Greenville*	Gibbs Stadium; Spartanburg, SC	SDN	W 42–27	7,392
September 20	6:00 pm	at Gardner–Webb*	Ernest W. Spangler Stadium; Boiling Springs, NC		L 36–43	6,450
September 27	7:00 pm	Virginia–Wise*	Gibbs Stadium; Spartanburg, SC		W 49–15	7,108
October 4	1:30 pm	The Citadel	Gibbs Stadium; Spartanburg, SC	ESPN3	W 17–13	9,259
October 11	3:30 pm	at Western Carolina	E. J. Whitmire Stadium; Cullowhee, NC	ESPN3	L 14–26	7,343
October 18	3:00 pm	at Samford	Seibert Stadium; Homewood, AL		W 24–20	4,157
October 25	1:30 pm	VMI^{†}	Gibbs Stadium; Spartanburg, SC		W 38–3	8,010
November 8	1:00 pm	at No. 13 Chattanooga	Finley Stadium; Chattanooga, TN	ESPN3	L 13–31	9,692
November 15	12:00 pm	at Furman	Paladin Stadium; Greenville, SC	ESPN3	L 14–31	6,282
November 22	1:30 pm	Mercer	Gibbs Stadium; Spartanburg, SC		W 34–6	7,051
*Non-conference game; ^{†}Homecoming; Rankings from The Sports Network Poll released prior to the game; All times are in Eastern time

- Source: Schedule
