= Sparky Woods =

American football player and coach (born 1953)

Current position
- Title: Senior assistant
- Team: Missouri State
- Conference: CUSA

Biographical details
- Born: December 20, 1953 (age 72); Oneida, Tennessee, U.S.

Playing career
- 1973–1975: Carson–Newman
- Positions: Quarterback, defensive back

Coaching career (HC unless noted)
- 1976: Tennessee (assistant)
- 1977: Kansas (assistant)
- 1978: North Alabama (DB)
- 1979–1982: Iowa State (WR)
- 1983: Appalachian State (OC/QB/RB)
- 1984–1988: Appalachian State
- 1989–1993: South Carolina
- 1994: New York Jets (OA)
- 1995–1996: Memphis (OC/QB)
- 1997–1998: Virginia (OC/QB)
- 1999–2002: Mississippi State (OC/QB)
- 2003–2006: Alabama (RB)
- 2008–2014: VMI
- 2015–2016: Richmond (RB/RC)
- 2017–2018: Richmond (RB/co-STC)
- 2019–2023: North Carolina (adviser)
- 2026–present: Missouri State (assistant)

Head coaching record
- Overall: 80–108–5
- Tournaments: 2–2 (NCAA D-I-AA playoffs)

Accomplishments and honors

Championships
- 2 SoCon (1986–1987)

Awards
- 3× Southern Conference Coach of the Year (1985–1987)

Phillip Perry "Sparky" Woods (born December 20, 1953) is an American college football coach. He is a senior assistant for the football team at Missouri State University. Woods served as the head football coach at Appalachian State University from 1984 to 1988, the University of South Carolina from 1989 to 1993, and the Virginia Military Institute (VMI), from 2008 to 2014.

== Playing career ==
Woods attended Oneida High School, where he is in its Hall of Fame. He holds the record for the most interceptions in a season. He played quarterback and defensive back at Carson–Newman College before graduating in 1976.

== Coaching career ==
Woods was named the 30th head coach at VMI on February 13, 2008. Before arriving at VMI, Woods had over 30 years of college and professional coaching experience.

When coaching at South Carolina, a song about Woods entitled "Sparky Rock" was released on cassette tape.

On November 24, 2014, it was announced by VMI that Woods' contract would not be renewed by Athletic Director Dave Diles. The announcement came less than a day after a 45–25 loss to arch rival The Citadel, ending a 2–10 season for the Keydets. In seven seasons, Woods compiled a 17–62 record at VMI, including a mark of 9–32 in conference play.

On February 20, 2015, he was named running backs coach, recruiting coordinator, and associate head coach, at the University of Richmond.

In 2019, Woods joined Mack Brown's staff at the University of North Carolina at Chapel Hill as a senior adviser to Brown.

In 2026, Woods would be hired by his son Casey as a senior assistant at Missouri State University.

== Personal life ==
Woods and his wife, Jean Ann, have two children, a daughter, Emily, and a son, Casey who is the head coach for Missouri State.

== Head coaching record ==
Year	Team	Overall	Conference	Standing	Bowl/playoffs	NCAA^{#}
Appalachian State Mountaineers (Southern Conference) (1984–1988)
1984	Appalachian State	4–7	2–5	7th		
1985	Appalachian State	8–3	6–1	2nd		12
1986	Appalachian State	9–2–1	6–0–1	1st	L NCAA Division I-AA First Round	6
1987	Appalachian State	11–3	7–0	1st	L NCAA Division I-AA Semifinal	2
1988	Appalachian State	6–4–1	4–3	4th		
Appalachian State:		38–19–2	25–9–1			
South Carolina Gamecocks (NCAA Division I-A independent) (1989–1991)
1989	South Carolina	6–4–1				
1990	South Carolina	6–5				
1991	South Carolina	3–6–2				
South Carolina Gamecocks (Southeastern Conference) (1992–1993)
1992	South Carolina	5–6	3–5	4th (Eastern)		
1993	South Carolina	5–6	2–6	T–4th (Eastern)		
South Carolina:		25–27–3	5–11			
VMI Keydets (Big South Conference) (2008–2013)
2008	VMI	4–7	1–4	T–3rd		
2009	VMI	2–9	1–5	6th		
2010	VMI	3–8	2–4	T–4th		
2011	VMI	2–9	2–4	T–5th		
2012	VMI	2–9	1–5	6th		
2013	VMI	2–10	1–4	6th		
VMI Keydets (Southern Conference) (2014)
2014	VMI	2–10	1–6	8th		
VMI:		17–62	9–32			
Total:		80–108–5				
National championship Conference title Conference division title or championship game berth
