= Phil Jones (American football) =

American football coach (1946–2020)

Biographical details
- Born: April 12, 1946; Thomaston, Georgia, U.S.
- Died: December 26, 2020 (aged 74)
- Education: Mercer University (1968)

Coaching career (HC unless noted)
- 1968–1971: Northside HS (GA) (assistant)
- 1972–1974: Jeff Davis HS (GA)
- 1975–1980: Fitzgerald HS (GA)
- 1981–1983: Dooly County HS (GA)
- 1984–1996: Winder-Barrow HS (GA)
- 1997–1998: Georgia (GA)
- 1999–2000: Georgia (DE)
- 2001–2002: SMU (ST/TE/OT)
- 2003–2004: Gardner–Webb (AHC)
- 2005–2015: Shorter

Head coaching record
- Overall: 54–65 (college); 159–107–4 (high school)
- Bowls: 0–1
- Tournaments: 0–1 (NAIA playoffs)

Accomplishments and honors

Championships
- 1 MSC West Division (2008)

Phil Jones (April 12, 1946 – December 26, 2020) was an American football coach. He served as a head coach at Shorter University from 2005 to 2015 and at several high schools across Georgia from 1973 through 1997 before he moved to the college ranks. After he served in assistant positions at Georgia, SMU and Gardner–Webb before he was hired in July 2004 to serve as the first head coach in the history of the Shorter Hawks football program.

== Death ==
Jones died on December 26, 2020, at the age of 74.

== Head coaching record ==
=== College ===
| Year | Team | Overall | Conference | Standing | Bowl/playoffs |
|---|---|---|---|---|---|
Shorter Hawks (Mid-South Conference) (2005–2011)
| 2005 | Shorter | 2–8 | 0–5 | | |
| 2006 | Shorter | 6–5 | 4–1 | 2nd (West) | |
| 2007 | Shorter | 7–4 | 3–2 | T–2nd (West) | |
| 2008 | Shorter | 9–3 | 4–1 | T–1st (West) | L NAIA First Round |
| 2009 | Shorter | 6–5 | 3–3 | T–4th (West) | |
| 2010 | Shorter | 5–6 | 2–4 | T–5th (West) | |
| 2011 | Shorter | 6–4 | 3–3 | T–4th (West) | |
Shorter Hawks (Gulf South Conference) (2012–2015)
| 2012 | Shorter | 6–5 | 2–3 | T–3rd | |
| 2013 | Shorter | 2–9 | 0–6 | 7th | |
| 2014 | Shorter | 3–8 | 1–6 | 7th | L Victory |
| 2015 | Shorter | 2–8 | 1–6 | 7th | |
| Shorter: | | 54–65 | 22–34 | | |
| Total: | | 54–65 | | | |
National championship Conference title Conference division title or championship game berth

=== High school ===
| Year | Team | Overall | Conference | Standing | Bowl/playoffs |
|---|---|---|---|---|---|
Jeff Davis Yellow Jackets () (1972–1974)
| 1972 | Jeff Davis | 6–4 | 4–3 | | |
| 1973 | Jeff Davis | 9–2 | 6–1 | | |
| 1974 | Jeff Davis | 6–4 | 4–2 | | |
| Jeff Davis: | | 21–10 | 14–6 | | |
Fitzgerald Purple Hurricanes () (1975–1980)
| 1975 | Fitzgerald | 2–8 | 2–2 | | |
| 1976 | Fitzgerald | 4–6 | 4–4 | | |
| 1977 | Fitzgerald | 4–5–1 | 4–5 | | |
| 1978 | Fitzgerald | 6–3–1 | 3–2 | | |
| 1979 | Fitzgerald | 6–4 | 2–3 | | |
| 1980 | Fitzgerald | 4–6 | 1–3 | | |
| Fitzgerald: | | 26–32–2 | 16–19 | | |
Dooly County Bobcats () (1981–1983)
| 1981 | Dooly County | 10–2 | 5–0 | 1st | |
| 1982 | Dooly County | 7–4 | 5–2 | | |
| 1983 | Dooly County | 14–1 | 7–0 | 1st | |
| Dooly County: | | 31–7 | 17–2 | | |
Winder-Barrow Bulldoggs () (1984–1996)
| 1984 | Winder-Barrow | 4–6 | 3–5 | | |
| 1985 | Winder-Barrow | 8–3 | 6–2 | | |
| 1986 | Winder-Barrow | 4–6 | 3–6 | | |
| 1987 | Winder-Barrow | 1–9 | 1–8 | | |
| 1988 | Winder-Barrow | 9–2 | 6–0 | 1st | |
| 1989 | Winder-Barrow | 10–1 | 6–0 | 1st | |
| 1990 | Winder-Barrow | 6–4–1 | 3–1 | 2nd | |
| 1991 | Winder-Barrow | 6–4–1 | 3–1 | 2nd | |
| 1992 | Winder-Barrow | 6–5 | 5–3 | | |
| 1993 | Winder-Barrow | 11–3 | 6–2 | | |
| 1994 | Winder-Barrow | 6–4 | 2–4 | | |
| 1995 | Winder-Barrow | 3–7 | 1–5 | | |
| 1996 | Winder-Barrow | 7–4 | 6–2 | | |
| Winder-Barrow: | | 81–56–2 | 51–39 | | |
| Total: | | 159–107–4 | | | |
National championship Conference title Conference division title or championship game berth
