= 2014 Victory Bowl =

Shorter Hawks	North Greenville Crusaders
(3–8)	(7–5)
16	42
Head coach: Phil Jones	Head coach: Jeff Farrington
	1	2	3	4	Total
Shorter	7	3	6	0	16
North Greenville	7	0	14	21	42
- Date: November 22, 2014
- Season: 2014
- Stadium: Barron Stadium
- Location: Rome, Georgia
- MVP: Offense: Robbie Brown (North Greenville); Defense: Jevaris Jones (Shorter)
- Referee: M. Stansbury
- Attendance: 1,175

The 2014 Victory Bowl was a college football bowl game played on November 22, 2014 at Barron Stadium in Rome, Georgia. It featured the North Greenville Crusaders against the Shorter Hawks. The Crusaders cruised to a 42-16 win. North Greenville and Shorter were NCAA Division II schools, with Shorter playing its first year in Div. II after years in NAIA. Despite a 3-7 record entering the game, Shorter was selected for the bowl due to its high Massey Index rating. Although the teams had the same number of first downs (22) and comparable offensive yardage (North Greenville 411 to Shorter 365), the teams combined for several turnovers, including two Hawks fumbles which were recovered in the end zone for touchdowns by the Crusaders.

== Game play ==
=== First quarter ===
North Greenville opened the scoring with a seven-play, 61-yard opening drive capped by Simeon Byrd's 14-yard touchdown run. Shorter responded with a 78-yard march of its own, with Eric Dodson tying the game at 7 on a one-yard TD run.

=== Second quarter ===
Shorter's defense forced three turnovers in the frame, but were only able to convert them into three points. Shorter's Santavious Bryant had an interception and a fumble, while Reggie Brown also recovered a Crusaders fumble. North Greenville's Quantel Mack also picked off a Shorter pass for four total turnovers during the quarter. After Brown's fumble recovery at Shorter's own 3-yard-line, the Hawks marched 78 yards before taking a 10-7 lead on a Kenny Langford 36-yard field goal at the end of the half.

=== Third quarter ===
The Crusaders took control quickly in the third quarter after Rashad Simmons recovered Shorter's fumbled kickoff return in the end zone, giving North Greenville a 14-10 lead. Then following a Hawks three-and-out, the Crusaders went 49 yards in about two minutes for another TD, increasing their lead to 21-10 on a Nelson Hughes-to-Mason Sanders seven-yard strike. The Hawks were able to regroup on their next series, driving almost 80 yards on 11 plays and pulling within 21-16 late in the quarter after a 10-yard Aaron Bryant touchdown run (the PAT failed).

=== Fourth quarter ===
Shorter was shut out in the final frame of the day. North Greenville scored three more times on a run by Byrd, a Robbie Brown 42-yard TD catch from Hughes and another end zone fumble recovery, this one by Charles Coleman, to make the final score 42-16.

=== Scoring Summary ===
Scoring summary

Quarter	Time	Drive			Team	Scoring information	Score	
Quarter	Time	Plays	Yards	TOP	Team	Scoring information	Shorter Hawks	North Greenville Crusaders
1	9:06	7	61	2:34	North Greenville Crusaders	Simeon Byrd 14-yard touchdown run, Justin Gravely kick Good	0	7
1	2:05	12	78	6:05	Shorter Hawks	Eric Dodson 1-yard touchdown run, Kenny Langford kick Good	7	7
2	0:04	11	78	1:38	Shorter Hawks	36-yard field goal by Kenny Langford	10	7
3	14:51	-	-	-	North Greenville Crusaders	Fumble recovery returned 0 yards for touchdown by Rashad Simmons, Justin Gravely kick Good	10	14
3	10:32	7	49	2:09	North Greenville Crusaders	Mason Sanders 7-yard touchdown reception from Nelson Hughes, Justin Gravely kick Goof	10	21
3	4:57	11	79	5:29	Shorter Hawks	Aaron Bryant 10-yard touchdown run, Team kick Failed	16	21
4	13:56	13	65	5:54	North Greenville Crusaders	Simeon Byrd 1-yard touchdown run, Justin Gravely kick Good	16	28
4	11:30	5	48	1:16	North Greenville Crusaders	Robbie Brown 42-yard touchdown reception from Nelson Hughes, Justin Gravely kick Good	16	35
4	7:04	1	62	0:45	North Greenville Crusaders	Fumble recovery returned 0 yards for touchdown by Charles Coleman, Justin Gravely kick Good	16	42
"TOP" = time of possession. For other American football terms, see Glossary of American football.							Shorter Hawks	North Greenville Crusaders
