= Jeff Farrington (American football) =

American football coach (born 1960)

Biographical details
- Born: September 14, 1960 (age 66); Winston-Salem, North Carolina, U.S.
- Education: The Citadel (1982)

Coaching career (HC unless noted)
- 1982: The Citadel (GA)
- 1983: East Carolina (GA)
- 1984: Florida State (GA)
- 1985–1986: East Carolina (OLB)
- 1987–1990: Lenoir–Rhyne (DC)
- 1991: Presbyterian (DC)
- 1992–1996: West Georgia (DC/DB)
- 1997–2001: East Tennessee State (DC/DB)
- 2002–2009: Furman (DB)
- 2010: Furman (DC)
- 2011: Mercer (DC)
- 2012: VMI (DC)
- 2013–2024: North Greenville

Head coaching record
- Overall: 58–62
- Bowls: 1–0
- Tournaments: 2–1 (NCAA D-II playoffs)

Robert Jeffrey Farrington (born September 14, 1960) is an American college football coach. He was the head football coach for North Greenville University from 2013 to 2024. He also coached for The Citadel, East Carolina, Florida State, Lenoir–Rhyne, Presbyterian, West Georgia, East Tennessee State, Furman, Mercer, and VMI.

== Head coaching record ==
Year	Team	Overall	Conference	Standing	Bowl/playoffs	AFCA^{#}
North Greenville Crusaders (NCAA Division II independent) (2013–2017)
2013	North Greenville	5–6				
2014	North Greenville	7–5			W Victory	
2015	North Greenville	7–3				
2016	North Greenville	9–5			L NCAA Division II Quarterfinal	17
2017	North Greenville	4–6				
North Greenville Crusaders / Trailblazers (Gulf South Conference) (2018–2024)
2018	North Greenville	4–6	3–4	6th		
2019	North Greenville	3–7	2–6	8th		
2020–21	No team—COVID-19					
2021	North Greenville	5–6	2–5	T–6th		
2022	North Greenville	3–8	2–5	T–6th		
2023	North Greenville	5–5	4–4	T–5th		
2024	North Greenville	6–5	4–3	4th		
North Greenville:		58–62	17–27			
Total:		58–62				
