= 2014 Furman Paladins football team =

American college football season

2014 Furman Paladins football
- Conference: Southern Conference
- Record: 3–9 (2–5 SoCon)
- Head coach: Bruce Fowler (4th season)
- Offensive coordinator: Jimmy Kiser (4th season)
- Defensive coordinator: John Windham (4th season)
- Captains: Marcus McMorris; Reese Hannon; Gary Wilkins
- Home stadium: Paladin Stadium

2014 Southern Conference football standings
	Conf.			Overall
Team	W		L	W		L
No. 8 Chattanooga $^	7	–	0	10	–	4
Samford	5	–	2	7	–	4
Western Carolina	5	–	2	7	–	5
Wofford	4	–	3	6	–	5
The Citadel	3	–	4	5	–	7
Furman	2	–	5	3	–	9
Mercer	1	–	6	6	–	6
VMI	1	–	6	2	–	10
$ – Conference champion; ^ – FCS playoff participant; Rankings from The Sports Network Poll

The 2014 Furman Paladins team represented Furman University as a member of the Southern Conference (SoCon) during the 2014 NCAA Division I FCS football season. Led by fourth-year head coach Bruce Fowler, the Paladins compiled an overall record of 3–9 with a mark of 2–5 in conference play, placing sixth in the SoCon. The team played home games at Paladin Stadium in Greenville, South Carolina.

== Schedule ==
Date	Time	Opponent	Rank	Site	TV	Result	Attendance
August 30	7:00 pm	Gardner–Webb*	No. 21	Paladin Stadium; Greenville, SC	SDN	W 13–3	7,533
September 6	6:00 pm	at Mercer	No. 19	Moye Complex; Macon, GA	ESPN3	W 25–20	12,227
September 13	7:00 pm	at Presbyterian*	No. 12	Bailey Memorial Stadium; Clinton, SC	WMYA	L 7–10	2,321
September 20	6:00 pm	at South Carolina State*	No. 21	Oliver C. Dawson Stadium; Orangeburg, SC		L 7–17	9,613
September 27	3:30 pm	Western Carolina		Paladin Stadium; Greenville, SC	ASN	L 17–35	9,789
October 4	7:00 pm	No. 3 Coastal Carolina*		Paladin Stadium; Greenville, SC	WMYA	L 31–37 ^{OT}	7,347
October 18	12:00 pm	at South Carolina*		Williams-Brice Stadium; Columbia, SC	SECN	L 10–41	78,101
October 25	1:30 pm	Samford^{†}		Paladin Stadium; Greenville, SC	ESPN3	L 0–45	8,047
November 1	1:30 pm	at VMI		Alumni Memorial Field; Lexington, VA	ESPN3	L 15–31	3,624
November 8	2:00 pm	at The Citadel		Johnson Hagood Stadium; Charleston, SC (rivalry)	SDN	L 35–42 ^{OT}	11,488
November 15	12:00 pm	Wofford		Paladin Stadium; Greenville, SC (rivalry)	ESPN3	W 31–14	6,282
November 22	3:30 pm	No. 9 Chattanooga		Paladin Stadium; Greenville, SC	ASN	L 19–45	4,377
*Non-conference game; ^{†}Homecoming; Rankings from The Sports Network Poll released prior to the game; All times are in Eastern time

== Ranking movements ==
Ranking movements Legend: ██ Increase in ranking ██ Decrease in ranking — = Not ranked RV = Received votes
	Week														
Poll	Pre	1	2	3	4	5	6	7	8	9	10	11	12	13	Final
Sports Network	21	19	12	21	RV	RV	RV	RV	RV	—	—	—	—	—	—
Coaches	18	17	12	21	RV	—	—	—	—	—	—	—	—	—	—
