= Davis Tull =

American football player (born 1991)

No. 55, 45
- Position: Linebacker

Personal information
- Born: November 12, 1991 (age 34); Knoxville, Tennessee, U.S.
- Listed height: 6 ft 3 in (1.91 m)
- Listed weight: 240 lb (109 kg)

Career information
- High school: Bearden (Knoxville)
- College: Chattanooga
- NFL draft: 2015: 5th round, 148th overall pick

Career history
- New Orleans Saints (2015); Atlanta Falcons (2016)*; Saskatchewan Roughriders (2017); Los Angeles Rams (2017)*; Memphis Express (2019); Jacksonville Jaguars (2019)*
- * Offseason or practice squad member only

Awards and highlights
- 4× All-American (2011–2014); 3× First-team All-SoCon (2012–2014); 3× SoCon Defensive Player of the Year (2012–2014); SoCon male athlete of the year (2014)
- Stats at Pro Football Reference
- Stats at CFL.ca

Charles Davis Tull (born November 12, 1991) is an American former professional football linebacker. He played college football for the Chattanooga Mocs and was selected by the New Orleans Saints in the fifth round of the 2015 NFL draft.

== College career ==
The Mocs were back to back Southern Conference champions from 2013 to 2014. Tull played defensive end and linebacker and started a school-record 48 straight games. As a true freshman in 2011, he was voted to the conference All-freshman team as well as the College Sports Journal Football Championship Subdivision (FCS) freshman All-American team.

In his sophomore season, he recorded 12.5 sacks and 19 tackles for loss, breaking school single season records for both. He was voted a first-team All-American by Walter Camp and AFCA and multiple fan sites. He received second-team All-American recognition from the Sports Network and Associated Press. He was also voted Defensive player of the year for the conference by the coaches and media and won the school's male athlete of the year award.

Coming into his junior year Phil Steele ranked Tull as the number 1 defensive end and number 6 overall player in the nation for the FCS. During the Mocs game against Furman that year, Tull had 3.5 sacks and 2 forced fumbles and was named national defensive player of the week by the Sports Network. He led the UTC Mocs to a co-conference championship and after the season was voted a consensus first-team All-American by every major publication, making Tull the first Unanimous All-American in school history. He broke the school's all-time sack record and was again voted the conference defensive player of the year by the league's coaches. He was awarded the elite defensive end award from the CPFA and also became UTC's first academic All-American in football by having above a 3.5 grade point average in Exercise Science. He finished his junior season as a finalist for the Buch Buchanan award, given annually to the top defensive player in FCS. He is UTC's all-time sack, tackles for loss, and forced fumble leader.

His senior season was again filled with awards leading UTC to a 2nd consecutive championship while earning unanimous first team All-American honors, Chattanooga's Male Student Athlete of the Year, first team academic All-American from Capital One, first team All-Southern Conference, the Champion Within Award from the Tennessee Sports Hall of Fame, Athlete of the Year from the Greater Chattanooga Sports Hall of Fame, Southern Conference defensive player of the year, and the Southern Conference Male Athlete of the Year.

Tull is the SoCon’s all-time sack leader with 37.0 and Chattanooga's all-time tackle-for-loss leader with 60.0. He was named SoCon Defensive Player of the Year in 2012, 2013, and 2014, becoming only the second player in SoCon history to earn the honor three times—the first being Appalachian State’s Dexter Coakley from 1994 to 1996. He was also named a finalist for the Buck Buchanan Award in both 2013 and 2014. In 2025, Tull was inducted into the University of Tennessee at Chattanooga Athletics Hall of Fame.

== Professional career ==
=== Pre-draft ===
Tull was invited to the East West Shrine Bowl Game by Shriners Hospital showcasing the best senior college football all-stars in the country and the NFL Combine where he set the all-time vertical jump record for his defensive line position at 42.5. He was ranked number 7 out of 177 outside linebackers by NFLdraftscout.com.

=== New Orleans Saints ===
Tull was selected in the fifth round of the 2015 NFL draft (148th overall) by the New Orleans Saints. He later signed to a 2.5 million dollar four-year contract and placed on the Saints 53-man roster. He was placed on the injured reserve early in the season.

On September 3, 2016, Tull was waived by the Saints.

=== Atlanta Falcons ===
On September 21, 2016, Tull was signed to the practice squad of the Atlanta Falcons. He was released on October 4, 2016 and re-signed on October 11. He was released on November 8, 2016.

=== Saskatchewan Roughriders ===
Tull signed with the Saskatchewan Roughriders of the Canadian Football League on May 26, 2017. On July 4, 2017, the Roughriders released Tull.

=== Los Angeles Rams ===
On August 18, 2017, Tull signed with the Los Angeles Rams. He was waived on September 2, 2017.

=== Memphis Express ===
Tull signed with the Memphis Express of the Alliance of American Football in 2018 for the 2019 season. He started every game at strong side linebacker before the league folded into bankruptcy in 2019.

=== Jacksonville Jaguars ===
On August 9, 2019, Tull was signed by the Jacksonville Jaguars. He was released with an injury settlement during final roster cuts on August 30, 2019.

Tull was drafted by the Houston Roughnecks of the XFL in the 2020 XFL draft, but did not sign with the league.
