= 2014 North Greenville Crusaders football team =

American college football season

2014 North Greenville Crusaders football

Victory Bowl, W 42–16 vs. Shorter
- Conference: Independent
- Record: 7–5
- Head coach: Jeff Farrington (2nd season)
- Home stadium: Younts Stadium

2014 NCAA Division II independents football records
	Conf.			Overall
Team	W		L	W		L
OK Panhandle State		–		7	–	3
Alderson Broaddus		–		7	–	4
Kentucky Wesleyan		–		7	–	4
North Greenville		–		7	–	5
UNC Pembroke		–		2	–	8
Limestone		–		2	–	9
Rankings from AFCA Poll

The 2014 North Greenville Crusaders football team represented North Greenville University in the 2014 NCAA Division II football season. They were led by second year head coach Jeff Farrington and played their home games at Younts Stadium. The team competed as a Division II Independent football team.

North Greenville defeated Shorter 42–16 in the Victory Bowl.

== Schedule ==
Date	Time	Opponent	Site	TV	Result	Attendance
September 4	7:00 pm	Ave Maria	Younts Stadium; Tigerville, SC		W 45–21	3,821
September 13	7:00 pm	at Wofford	Gibbs Stadium; Spartanburg, SC	SDN	L 27–42	7,392
September 20	7:00 pm	at Tusculum	Pioneer Field; Greeneville, TN		W 38–35	2,894
September 28	7:00 pm	Brevard	Younts Stadium; Tigerville, SC		W 41–31	3,441
October 4	1:00 pm	Limestone	Younts Stadium; Tigerville, SC		W 38–9	4,609
October 11	2:00 pm	at No. 6 Lenoir–Rhyne	Moretz Stadium; Hickory, NC		L 21–32	7,821
October 18	2:30 pm	Mars Hill	Younts Stadium; Tigerville, SC		L 27–30	4,871
October 25	2:30 pm	at No. 17 Carson–Newman^{†}	Burke–Tarr Stadium; Jefferson City, TN		L 34–35	4,809
November 1	2:00 pm	Wingate	Younts Stadium; Tigerville, SC		W 24–14	2,414
November 8	1:30 pm	at Catawba	Shuford Stadium; Salisbury, NC		L 17–28	2,641
November 15	1:00 pm	Newberry	Younts Stadium; Tigerville, SC		W 34–14	3,441
November 22	12:00 pm	at Shorter	Barron Stadium; Rome, GA (NCCAA Victory Bowl)		W 42–16	1,175
^{†}Homecoming; Rankings from AFCA Poll released prior to the game; All times are in Eastern time
