= 2014 The Citadel Bulldogs football team =

American college football season

2014 The Citadel Bulldogs football
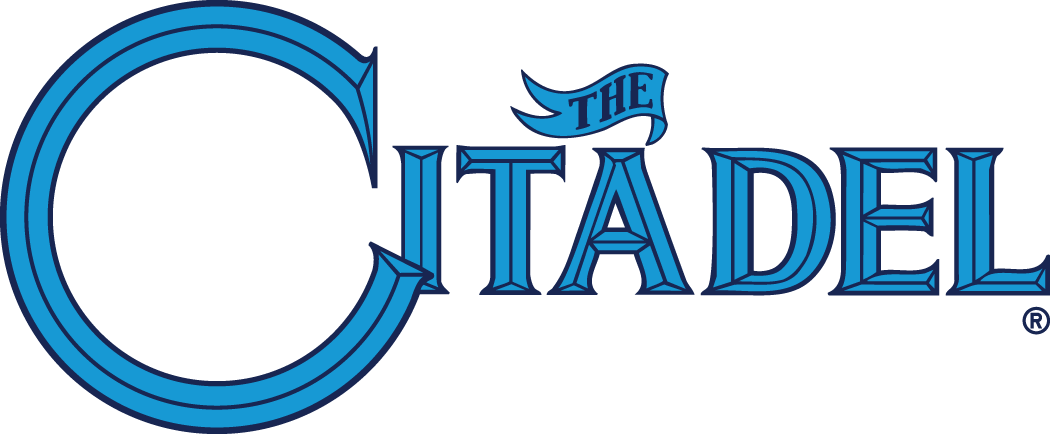
- Conference: Southern Conference
- Record: 5–7 (3–4 SoCon)
- Head coach: Mike Houston (1st season)
- Offensive coordinator: Brent Thompson (1st season)
- Offensive scheme: Triple option
- Defensive coordinator: Maurice Drayton (1st season)
- Base defense: 4–3
- Home stadium: Johnson Hagood Stadium

2014 Southern Conference football standings
	Conf.			Overall
Team	W		L	W		L
No. 8 Chattanooga $^	7	–	0	10	–	4
Samford	5	–	2	7	–	4
Western Carolina	5	–	2	7	–	5
Wofford	4	–	3	6	–	5
The Citadel	3	–	4	5	–	7
Furman	2	–	5	3	–	9
Mercer	1	–	6	6	–	6
VMI	1	–	6	2	–	10
$ – Conference champion; ^ – FCS playoff participant; Rankings from The Sports Network Poll

The 2014 The Citadel Bulldogs football team represented The Citadel, The Military College of South Carolina in the 2014 NCAA Division I FCS football season. The Bulldogs were led by first-year head coach Mike Houston and played their home games at Johnson Hagood Stadium. They played as members of the Southern Conference, as they have since 1936. They finished the season 5–7, 3–4 in SoCon play to finish in fifth place.

== Schedule ==
For the fifth year in a row, home games in September were scheduled for a 6:00 p.m. kickoff rather than the traditional 2:00 p.m. kickoff.

Date	Time	Opponent	Site	TV	Result	Attendance
August 30	6:00 p.m.	No. 7 Coastal Carolina*	Johnson Hagood Stadium; Charleston, SC	SDN	L 16–31	10,828
September 6	7:30 p.m.	at No. 1 (FBS) Florida State*	Doak Campbell Stadium; Tallahassee, FL	RSN	L 12–37	81,294
September 20	6:00 p.m.	at Charleston Southern*	Buccaneer Field; North Charleston, SC		L 18–20	7,954
September 27	6:00 p.m.	Gardner–Webb*	Johnson Hagood Stadium; Charleston, SC	SDN	W 37–14	8,573
October 4	1:30 p.m.	at Wofford	Gibbs Stadium; Spartanburg, SC (rivalry)	ESPN3	L 13–17	9,259
October 11	2:00 p.m.	Charlotte*	Johnson Hagood Stadium; Charleston, SC		W 63–56 ^{2OT}	10,467
October 18	12:00 p.m.	No. 17 Chattanooga	Johnson Hagood Stadium; Charleston, SC	ASN	L 14–34	8,037
October 25	2:00 p.m.	at Western Carolina	E. J. Whitmire Stadium; Cullowhee, NC		L 15–29	13,323
November 1	4:00 p.m.	at Mercer	Moye Complex; Macon, GA	ESPN3	W 28–26	10,271
November 8	2:00 p.m.	Furman^{†}	Johnson Hagood Stadium; Charleston, SC (rivalry)	SDN	W 42–35 ^{OT}	11,488
November 15	1:00 p.m.	Samford	Johnson Hagood Stadium; Charleston, SC	SDN	L 17–20	7,638
November 22	1:30 p.m.	at VMI	Alumni Memorial Field; Lexington, VA (Military Classic of the South)	ESPN3	W 45–25	7,097
*Non-conference game; ^{†}Homecoming; Rankings from The Sports Network Poll released prior to the game; All times are in Eastern time

== Game summaries ==
=== Coastal Carolina ===
Team	1	2	3	4	Total
• #7 Chanticleers	14	0	7	10	31
Bulldogs	0	0	3	13	16

- Date: August 30, 2014
- Location: Johnson Hagood Stadium, Charleston, SC
- Game start: 6:00 PM EST
- Game attendance: 10,828

=== Florida State ===
Team	1	2	3	4	Total
Bulldogs	0	0	6	6	12
• #1 Seminoles	14	14	6	3	37

- Date: September 6, 2014
- Location: Doak Campbell Stadium, Tallahassee, FL
- Game start: 7:30 PM EST

=== Charleston Southern ===
Team	1	2	3	4	Total
Bulldogs	0	3	7	8	18
• Buccaneers	0	10	7	3	20

- Date: September 20, 2014
- Location: Buccaneer Field, North Charleston, SC
- Game start: 6:00 PM EST
- Game attendance: 7,954

=== Gardner–Webb ===
Team	1	2	3	4	Total
Runnin' Bulldogs	0	7	7	0	14
• Bulldogs	7	6	14	10	37

- Date: September 27, 2014
- Location: Johnson Hagood Stadium, Charleston, SC
- Game start: 6:00 PM EST
- Game attendance: 8,573

=== Wofford ===
Team	1	2	3	4	Total
Bulldogs	3	3	7	0	13
• Terriers	7	3	7	0	17

- Date: September 6, 2014
- Location: Gibbs Stadium, Spartanburg, SC
- Game start: 1:30 PM EST
- Game attendance: 9,259

=== Charlotte ===
Team	1	2	3	4	OT	2OT	Total
49ers	7	17	7	18	7	0	56
• Bulldogs	21	14	0	14	7	7	63

- Date: October 11, 2014
- Location: Johnson Hagood Stadium, Charleston, SC
- Game start: 2:00 PM EST
- Game attendance: 10,467

=== Chattanooga ===
Team	1	2	3	4	Total
• #17 Mocs	14	17	3	0	34
Bulldogs	0	0	7	7	14

- Date: October 18, 2014
- Location: Johnson Hagood Stadium, Charleston, SC
- Game start: 12:00 PM EST
- Game attendance: 8,037

=== Western Carolina ===
Team	1	2	3	4	Total
Bulldogs	8	0	0	7	15
• Catamounts	7	0	14	8	29

- Date: October 25, 2014
- Location: E. J. Whitmire Stadium, Cullowhee, NC
- Game start: 2:00 PM EST
- Game attendance: 13,323

=== Mercer ===
Team	1	2	3	4	Total
• Bulldogs	14	14	0	0	28
Bears	10	0	10	6	26

- Date: November 1, 2014
- Location: Moye Complex, Macon, GA
- Game start: 4:00 PM EST

=== Furman ===
Team	1	2	3	4	OT	Total
Paladins	21	7	0	7	0	35
• Bulldogs	13	15	0	7	7	42

- Date: November 8, 2014
- Location: Johnson Hagood Stadium, Charleston, SC
- Game start: 2:00 PM EST

=== Samford ===
Team	1	2	3	4	Total
• Bulldogs (Sam)	0	7	0	13	20
Bulldogs (Cit)	0	0	7	10	17

- Date: November 15, 2014
- Location: Johnson Hagood Stadium, Charleston, SC
- Game start: 1:00 PM EST
- Game attendance: 7,638

=== VMI ===
Team	1	2	3	4	Total
• Bulldogs	7	17	21	0	45
Keydets	0	13	6	6	25

- Date: November 22, 2014
- Location: Alumni Memorial Field, Lexington, VA
- Game start: 1:30 PM EST
- Game attendance: 7,097
- Television network: ESPN3
