= Dave Diles =

American sportscaster

David L. Diles (October 14, 1931 – December 29, 2009) was an American sports broadcaster, journalist, and author. He was a broadcaster for ABC Sports and hosted the Prudential College Football Scoreboard Show.

== Early life ==
Dave Diles was born October 14, 1931, in Middleport, Ohio. At age 13 he started delivering the local newspaper, The Daily Sentinel, in Pomeroy, Ohio.

Diles moved to Athens, Ohio, and attended Ohio University. He then worked for a local newspaper, the Athens Messenger, and later the Associated Press in Columbus and Detroit until 1961.

== Career ==
In 1961, he became sports director of ABC's Detroit station WXYZ-TV until 1972 and then again from 1979 to 1982.

He hosted many other sports broadcasting programs, including College Football Scoreboard, Wide World of Sports, the Indianapolis 500, Olympic Games, NASCAR auto racing, professional golf, bowling, track and field, and college football play by play. He is also known for hosting Race for No. 1 and The Big Ten Today.

During the 1960s, '70s, and '80s, Diles was the host of a local Detroit sports radio broadcasting show called Dial Dave Diles. This was the city's first radio sports talk show.

Diles is known for his work for commentating play by play for the Los Angeles Clippers, Detroit Lions and Pistons, and the Ohio State basketball team. He also covered the Olympics.

He wrote eight books about network television sports and the experiences of coaches and players in the professional and college sport business. This included co-authoring 1979's Terry Bradshaw, Man of Steel, a Christian-themed autobiography of the Pittsburgh Steeler quarterback.

Diles was the president of the Football Writers of America, Michigan Chapter, and the Detroit Sports Media Association.

Outside of sports, Diles was a substitute host for Lou Gordon on occasion.

== Recognition ==
Diles was awarded many honors in the sports world. Some include:

- Three times named the Associated Press Sportscaster of the Year
- Received four Associated Press Documentary Awards
- National Sports Service Award from Sport Magazine
- National Football Foundation and Hall of Fame
- National Association of Intercollegiate Athletics
- Inducted into the Michigan Media Hall of Fame
- Inducted into the Michigan Sports Hall of Fame in 2006
- Received the Silver Circle Award from the National Academy of Television Arts and Sciences

== Later life ==
Diles received the Distinguished Alumni Award from Ohio University. He established a scholarship at the university for students from his hometown in Meigs County. He was a trustee for another local college, The University of Rio Grande.

Diles died on December 29, 2009, of cancer that caused a stroke. He was 78 years old.

Diles' hometown named a park after him. The Dave Diles Park is named in his honor located in his hometown of Middleport, Ohio, along the banks of the Ohio River.
