= Dave Diles Jr. =

American college athletics administrator

Eric Hyman
Biographical details
- Born: 1961 (age 64–65)
- Education: Ohio University (1983); University of Michigan (1988)

Administrative career (AD unless noted)
- 1989–1991: Central Michigan (assistant AD)
- 1991–1994: Auburn (assistant AD)
- 1994–1999: St. Bonaventure
- 1999–2005: Eastern Michigan
- 2005–2013: Case Western Reserve
- 2013–2021: VMI
- 2021–2023: Lake Superior State

Dave Diles Jr. (born 1961) is an American former college athletics administrator. He served as the athletic director at St. Bonaventure University from 1994 to 1999, Eastern Michigan University from 1999 to 2005, Case Western Reserve University from 2005 to 2013, the Virginia Military Institute (VMI) from 2013 to 2021, and Lake Superior State University from 2021 to 2023. Diles was an administrative assistant for the University of Michigan in the late 1980s.

Diles is the son of the late sports broadcaster Dave Diles Sr.

== Early life and education ==
Diles was born in 1961, in Bloomfield Hills, Michigan, a nearby suburb of Detroit. His father, Dave Diles Sr., was a prominent ABC Sports broadcaster. The two had a close bond together through sports, and the younger Diles noted in a press conference that his father once called him on the phone, crying, to let him know that his son's favorite hockey player (Gary Bergman) had been traded. His father died in December 2009 from a stroke.

Diles attended Ohio University from which he graduated in 1983 with a master's degree in sports administration. Diles later earned a doctor of education from the University of Michigan in 1988. He is married to his wife, Suzanne Irene Diles, and the couple has two sons, Matthew and Mitchell.

== Administrative career ==
Diles' athletic administrative career began in at Central Michigan University where he was the Chippewas' assistant athletic director from 1989 to 1991. He then took the same position at Auburn University from 1991 to 1994.

Diles received his first head athletic directing job in 1994 at St. Bonaventure University in western New York. During his tenure with the Bonnies, the school's programs won more Atlantic 10 Conference championships in from 1995 to 1999 than they had in all years prior. After leaving St. Bonaventure in 1999, Diles went to Eastern Michigan University. He oversaw the Eagles win 21 total Mid-American Conference titles in a six-year span, and graduation rates of Eastern Michigan student-athletes almost doubled. The Eagles football team, however, failed to achieve a winning season under Diles' direction.

In 2005, Diles stepped away from the NCAA Division I ranks and became the athletic director at Case Western Reserve University, an NCAA Division III school. He cited that he choose the school for a "breadth of responsibilities. Having an opportunity to expand my professional responsibilities to include physical education, intramurals, club sports, recreational programming was very attractive." In Diles' tenure, Case Western football made the Division III playoffs three times. The team also won 38 consecutive regular-season games, and Diles oversaw the opening of Village at 115, which included expanded fan seating and press boxes.

Following an eight-year career with Case Western, Diles was appointed as the 11th athletic director for the Virginia Military Institute on September 4, 2013. He was appointed by VMI superintendent J. H. Binford Peay III, and was the successor to Donny White, who had been the Keydets' athletic director since 1998. The contract was for four years worth $150,000.
