= Pete Hanna Stadium =

Stadium in Homewood, Alabama, USA

Coordinates: 33°27′48″N 86°47′43″W

Bobby Bowden Field at Pete Hanna Stadium
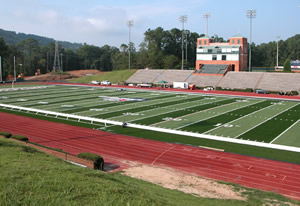
- Interactive map of Bobby Bowden Field at Pete Hanna Stadium
- Location: 800 Lakeshore Drive; Homewood, Alabama 35229
- Owner: Samford University
- Operator: Samford University
- Capacity: 6,700 (1989–present); 6,500 (1958–1988)
- Surface: LSR Blade

Construction
- Groundbreaking: 1957
- Opened: September 26, 1958

Tenant
- Samford Bulldogs (NCAA) (1958–present)

Pete Hanna Stadium (formerly Seibert Stadium) is a 6,700-seat multi-purpose stadium in Homewood, Alabama. It is home to the Samford University Bulldogs college football team. The facility opened in 1958 and was named for F. Page Seibert, who in 1961, donated money for the completion of the stadium. In 2021, the field was named “Bobby Bowden Field” in honor of football coach Bobby Bowden. In 2023, the stadium structure was renamed Pete Hanna Stadium.

The largest crowd in stadium history was in 1994 when over 11,000 showed up to see Steve McNair and Alcorn State.

== History ==
The four-level Bashinsky Press Tower was completed before the 1989 season. This Georgian-Colonial structure contains complete facilities for print and electronic media on the third level, reserved seating for 51 guests on the second level, and a concession stand and restroom facilities on the ground floor. A partially covered film deck is located atop the facility, and an elevator serves all levels.

At the same time, more than 200 theatre-type reserved seats were added in front of the press tower, bringing the seating capacity to 6,700. Aluminum seating replaced the original wooden seats. A scoreboard featuring an electronic matrix message board was added before the 1994 season.

In fall 2005, the original grass surface was replaced with an LSR Blade Synthetic Surface. That surface was updated and replaced in the summer of 2014.

In 2009, Samford added the Cooney Family Field House in the south end zone of the stadium. The field house holds a locker room, weight room, training room, equipment room, coaches offices and meeting rooms for the team.

On October 14, 2023, Samford University announced that the stadium would be renamed to Pete Hanna Stadium, after Pete Hanna, a former Samford two-way player, industrialist, and sponsor.

== See also ==
- List of NCAA Division I FCS football stadiums
