= 2016 Southern Conference football season =

- League: NCAA Division I Football Championship
- Sport: Football
- Duration: September 1, 2015 – November 19, 2015
- Teams: 9
- TV partner(s): SoCon Digital Network; American Sports Network; ESPN3
- Season champions: The Citadel

Southern Conference football seasons
- ← 2015 2017 →

2016 Southern Conference football standings
	Conf.			Overall
Team	W		L	W		L
No. 10 The Citadel $^	8	–	0	10	–	2
No. 9 Wofford ^	6	–	2	10	–	4
No. 13 Chattanooga ^	6	–	2	9	–	4
No. 23 Samford ^	5	–	3	7	–	5
Mercer	4	–	4	6	–	5
Furman	3	–	5	3	–	8
East Tennessee State	2	–	6	5	–	6
Western Carolina	1	–	7	2	–	9
VMI	1	–	7	3	–	8
$ – Conference champion; ^ – FCS playoff participant; Rankings from STATS Poll

The 2016 Southern Conference football season was the 95th season of college football for the Southern Conference (SoCon) and formed a part of the 2016 NCAA Division I FCS football season.

== Head coaches ==
- Russ Huesman, Chattanooga – 8th year
- Brent Thompson, The Citadel – 1st year
- Carl Torbush, East Tennessee State – 2nd year
- Bruce Fowler, Furman – 6th year
- Bobby Lamb, Mercer – 4th year
- Chris Hatcher, Samford – 2nd year
- Scott Wachenheim, VMI – 2nd year
- Mark Speir, Western Carolina – 5th year
- Mike Ayers, Wofford – 29th year

== Preseason poll results ==
First place votes in parentheses

Media			Coaches		
Place	School	Points	Place	School	Points
1	Chattanooga (26)	250	1	Chattanooga (7)	63
2	The Citadel (2)	208	2	The Citadel (1)	52
3	Western Carolina	179	3	Samford (1)	50
4	Mercer	148	4	Western Carolina	41
5	Samford	147	5	Mercer	38
6	Wofford	136	6	Wofford	33
7	Furman	102	7	Furman	24
8	VMI	62	8	VMI	14
9	East Tennessee State	28	9	East Tennessee State	9

=== Preseason All-Conference Teams ===
Offensive Player of the Year: Detrez Newsome, Jr., RB (Western Carolina)
Defensive Player of the Year: Keionta Davis, Sr., DL (Chattanooga)

Position	Player	Class	Team
First Team Offense
QB	Al Cobb	Jr.	VMI
RB	Derrick Craine	Sr.	Chattanooga
RB	Detrez Newsome	Jr.	Western Carolina
WR	Karel Hamilton	Sr.	Samford
WR	Aaron Sanders	Sr.	VMI
TE	Tyler Sexton	Sr.	Western Carolina
OL	Isaiah Pinson	Jr.	The Citadel
OL	Brett Niederreither	Sr.	Mercer
OL	Armando Bonheur	Sr.	Samford
OL	Corey Levin	Sr.	Chattanooga
OL	Jacob Revis	Jr.	Chattanooga
OL (tie)	Anton Wahrby	Sr.	Wofford
First Team Defense
DL	Joe Crochet	Sr.	The Citadel
DL	Ahmad Gooden	Sophomore	Samford
DL	Keionta Davis	Sr.	Chattanooga
DL	Miles Brown	So.	Wofford
LB	Tevin Floyd	Sr.	The Citadel
LB	Nakevion Leslie	Sr.	Chattanooga
LB	Tyson Dickson	Sr.	Western Carolina
LB (tie)	Daniel Riddle	Jr.	Western Carolina
DB	Dee Delaney	Jr.	The Citadel
DB	Trey Robinson	Sr.	Furman
DB	Jamerson Blount	Sr.	Samford
DB	Lucas Webb	Jr.	Chattanooga
First Team Special Teams
PK	Henrique Ribeiro	Sr.	Chattanooga
P	Ian Berryman	So.	Western Carolina
RS	Dane Forlines	Sr.	VMI

== Rankings ==
Legend
Increase in ranking
Decrease in ranking
Not ranked previous week

		Pre	Wk 1	Wk 2	Wk 3	Wk 4	Wk 5	Wk 6	Wk 7	Wk 8	Wk 9	Wk 10	Wk 11	Wk 12	Final
Chattanooga	Stats	6	6	6	5	5	5	5	11	10	9	7	12		
Chattanooga	C	7	6	4	3	3	3	3	8	8	8	7	11		
Chattanooga	FCS	Not released									8	7	NR	Not released	
The Citadel	Stats	15	15	15	10	9	9	8	5	5	5	5	5		
The Citadel	C	15	16	15	10	10	9	9	6	7	7	6	6		
The Citadel	FCS	Not released									6	6	6	Not released	
East Tennessee State	Stats	–	–	–	RV	–	–	–	–	–	–	–	–		
East Tennessee State	C		–	–	–	–	–	–	–	–	–	–	–		
East Tennessee State	FCS	Not released									–	–	–	Not released	
Furman	Stats	–	RV	RV	–	–	–	–	–	–	–	–	–		
Furman	C		RV	–	–	–	–	–	–	–	–	–	–		
Furman	FCS	Not released									–	–	–	Not released	
Mercer	Stats	RV	RV	–	RV	–	–	–	–	–	–	–	–		
Mercer	C		RV	–	–	–	–	–	–	–	–	–	–		
Mercer	FCS	Not released									–	–	–	Not released	
Samford	Stats	RV	RV	RV	RV	RV	RV	24	21	20	20	22	18		
Samford	C		RV	RV	RV	RV	RV	24	20	19	18	21	18		
Samford	FCS	Not released									–	–	–	Not released	
VMI	Stats	–	–	–	–	–	–	–	–	–	–	–	–		
VMI	C		–	–	–	–	–	–	–	–	–	–	–		
VMI	FCS	Not released									–	–	–	Not released	
Western Carolina	Stats	RV	RV	RV	–	–	–	–	–	–	–	–	–		
Western Carolina	C		–	–	–	–	–	–	–	–	–	–	–		
Western Carolina	FCS	Not released									–	–	–	Not released	
Wofford	Stats	RV	RV	RV	RV	RV	RV	RV	RV	RV	RV	RV	20		
Wofford	C		RV	RV	RV	RV	RV	RV	RV	RV	RV	RV	19		
Wofford	FCS	Not released									–	–	–	Not released	

== Regular season ==
Index to colors and formatting
SoCon member won
SoCon member lost
SoCon teams in **bold**

All times Eastern time.

Rankings reflect that of the Sports Network poll for that week.

=== Week One ===
Date	Time	Visiting team	Home team	Site	Broadcast	Result	Attendance	Reference
September 1	7:00 PM	**The Citadel**	**Mercer**	Moye Complex • Macon, GA	FSN	**CIT** 24–23	12,542	
September 1	7:00 PM	Shorter	**Chattanooga**	Finley Stadium • Chattanooga, TN	SDN	**W** 66–0	9,588	
September 1	7:00 PM	Mars Hill	**Samford**	Seibert Stadium • Homewood, AL	ESPN3	**W** 77–7	4,482	
September 1	7:00 PM	**Wofford**	Tennessee Tech	Tucker Stadium • Cookeville, TN	OVCDN	**W** 21–7	9,066	
September 2	7:00 PM	**Furman**	Michigan State	Spartan Stadium • East Lansing, MI	BTN	**L** 13–28	74,516	
September 3	6:00 PM	**Western Carolina**	East Carolina	Dowdy–Ficklen Stadium • Greenville, NC	ESPN3	**L** 7–52	44,161	
September 3	6:30 PM	**VMI**	Akron	InfoCision Stadium • Akron, OH	ESPN3	**L** 24–47	11,061	
September 3	7:00 PM	**East Tennessee State**	Kennesaw State	Fifth Third Bank Stadium • Kennesaw, GA	WPCH	**W** 20–17	8,574	

Players of the week:

Offensive		Defensive		Special teams	
Player	Team	Player	Team	Player	Team
Tyler Renew	The Citadel	Jaleel Green	Wofford	JJ Jerman	East Tennessee State
**Reference: Weekly Release**

=== Week Two ===
Date	Time	Visiting team	Home team	Site	Broadcast	Result	Attendance	Reference
September 10	2:00 PM	Presbyterian	**Chattanooga**	Finley Stadium • Chattanooga, TN	SDN	**W** 34–0	8,370	
September 10	3:00 PM	**Mercer**	Georgia Tech	Bobby Dodd Stadium • Atlanta, GA	ESPN3	**L** 10–35	49,992	
September 10	4:00 PM	**Wofford**	Ole Miss	Vaught–Hemingway Stadium • Oxford, MS	SECN	**L** 13–38	64,232	
September 10	6:00 PM	**Furman**	**The Citadel**	Johnson Hagood Stadium • Charleston, SC	ESPN3	**CIT** 19–14	12,009	
September 10	6:00 PM	**VMI**	Morehead State	Jayne Stadium • Morehead, KY	OVCDN	**W** 17–13	5,588	
September 10	6:00 PM	Gardner–Webb	**Western Carolina**	E. J. Whitmire Stadium • Cullowhee, NC	SDN	**W** 44–14	11,598	
September 10	7:00 PM	**Samford**	Central Arkansas	Estes Stadium • Conway, AR	BNN	**W** 35–29	9,987	

Players of the week:

Offensive		Defensive		Special teams	
Player	Team	Player	Team	Player	Team
Tyrie Adams	Western Carolina	Dee Delaney	The Citadel	Austin Barnard	Samford
**Reference: Weekly Release**

=== Week Three ===
Date	Time	Visiting team	Home team	Site	Broadcast	Result	Attendance	Reference
September 17	1:30 PM	**Western Carolina**	**East Tennessee State**	Bristol Motor Speedway • Bristol, TN	ESPN3	**ETSU** 34–31	13,863	
September 17	3:00 PM	Johnson C. Smith	**Wofford**	Gibbs Stadium • Spartanburg, SC	ESPN3	**W** 59–0	5,417	
September 17	4:00 PM	Tennessee Tech	**Mercer**	Moye Complex • Macon, GA	ESPN3	**W** 34–27	9,772	
September 17	6:00 PM	**The Citadel**	Gardner–Webb	Ernest W. Spangler Stadium • Boiling Springs, NC	BSN	**W** 31–24	6,850	
September 17	7:00 PM	**Chattanooga**	**Furman**	Paladin Stadium • Greenville, SC	ESPN3	**UTC** 21–14	5,347	

Players of the week:

Offensive		Defensive		Special teams	
Player	Team	Player	Team	Player	Team
Austin Herink	East Tennessee State	Nakevion Leslie	Chattanooga	DeAndre Shoultz	The Citadel
**Reference: Weekly Release**

=== Week Four ===
Date	Time	Visiting team	Home team	Site	Broadcast	Result	Attendance	Reference
September 24	1:30 PM	**East Tennessee State**	**Wofford**	Gibbs Stadium • Spartanburg, SC	ESPN3	**WOF** 31–0	7,316	
September 24	2:00 PM	**Samford**	**Chattanooga**	Finley Stadium • Chattanooga, TN	SDN	**UTC** 41–21	8,714	
September 24	3:00 PM	**VMI**	Bucknell	Christy Mathewson–Memorial Stadium • Lewisburg, PA	PLN	**W** 23–17^{3OT}	4,972	
September 24	6:00 PM	**Furman**	Coastal Carolina	Brooks Stadium • Conway, SC	CCUN	**L** 21–41	10,311	

Players of the week:

Offensive		Defensive		Special teams	
Player	Team	Player	Team	Player	Team
Derrick Craine	Chattanooga	Ryan Francis	VMI	Henrique Ribeiro	Chattanooga
**Reference: Weekly Release**

=== Week Five ===
Date	Time	Visiting team	Home team	Site	Broadcast	Result	Attendance	Reference
October 1	12:00 PM	**Chattanooga**	**East Tennessee State**	Kermit Tipton Stadium • Johnson City, TN	SDN	**UTC** 37–17	7,411	
October 1	1:30 PM	**Mercer**	**VMI**	Alumni Memorial Field • Lexington, VA	ESPN3	**MER** 33–30^{OT}	5,266	
October 1	3:00 PM	**Wofford**	**Samford**	Seibert Stadium • Homewood, AL	ESPN3	**SAM** 28–26	8,509	
October 1	3:00 PM	Kennesaw State	**Furman**	Paladin Stadium • Greenville, SC	ESPN3	**L** 42–52	6,970	
October 1	3:30 PM	**The Citadel**	**Western Carolina**	E. J. Whitmire Stadium • Cullowhee, NC	ESPN3	**CIT** 37–14	12,283	

Players of the week:

Offensive		Defensive		Special teams	
Player	Team	Player	Team	Player	Team
Deviln Hodges	Samford	Joe Crochet	The Citadel	Henrique Ribeiro	Chattanooga
**Reference: Weekly Release**

=== Week Six ===
Date	Time	Visiting team	Home team	Site	Broadcast	Result	Attendance	Reference
October 6	7:00 PM	North Greenville	**The Citadel**	Younts Stadium • Tigerville, SC (Note: Due to Hurricane Matthew, this game was moved from October 8 in Charleston, SC to October 6 in Tigerville, SC. The Citadel still competed as the "home" team, although it was played at North Greenville.)		**W** 38–14	5,435	
October 8	1:00 PM	**Samford**	**Furman**	Paladin Stadium • Greenville, SC	ESPN3	**SAM** 38–21	4,587	
October 8	1:30 PM	**East Tennessee State**	**VMI**	Alumni Memorial Field • Lexington, VA	ESPN3	**VMI** 37–7	5,638	
October 8	4:00 PM	**Mercer**	**Chattanooga**	Finley Stadium • Chattanooga, TN	SDN	**UTC** 52–31	11,039	
October 8	7:00 PM	**Wofford**	**Western Carolina**	E. J. Whitmire Stadium • Cullowhee, NC	ESPN3	**WOF** 31–19	9,457	

Players of the week:

Offensive		Defensive		Special teams	
Player	Team	Player	Team	Player	Team
Devlin Hodges	Samford	Montrell Pardue	Chattanooga	David Marvin	Wofford
**Reference: Weekly Release**

=== Week Seven ===
Date	Time	Visiting team	Home team	Site	Broadcast	Result	Attendance	Reference
October 15	12:00 PM	**Furman**	**East Tennessee State**	Kermit Tipton Stadium • Johnson City, TN	SDN	**FUR** 52–7	6,052	
October 15	3:00 PM	**Chattanooga**	**The Citadel**	Johnson Hagood Stadium • Charleston, SC	FSN	**CIT** 22–14	14,590	
October 15	3:00 PM	**VMI**	**Samford**	Seibert Stadium • Homewood, AL	ESPN3	**SAM** 55–21	4,085	
October 15	4:00 PM	**Western Carolina**	**Mercer**	Moye Complex • Macon, GA	ESPN3	**MER** 38–24	12,247	

Players of the week:

Offensive		Defensive		Special teams	
Player	Team	Player	Team	Player	Team
Devlin Hodges	Samford	Nakevion Leslie	Chattanooga	Cody Clark	The Citadel
**Reference: Weekly Release**

=== Week Eight ===
Date	Time	Visiting team	Home team	Site	Broadcast	Result	Attendance	Reference
October 20	7:30 PM	West Virginia Wesleyan	**East Tennessee State**	Kermit Tipton Stadium • Johnson City, TN	SDN	**W** 38–7	6,196	
October 22	1:30 PM	**The Citadel**	**Wofford**	Gibbs Stadium • Spartanburg, SC	ESPN3	**CIT** 24–21^{OT}	11,102	
October 22	2:00 PM	**VMI**	**Chattanooga**	Finley Stadium • Chattanooga, TN	SDN	**UTC** 30–13	10,505	
October 22	5:00 PM	**Mercer**	Austin Peay	Fortera Stadium • Clarksville, TN	OVCDN	**W** 41–34	6,506	
October 22	7:00 PM	**Western Carolina**	**Samford**	Seibert Stadium • Homewood, AL	ASN	**SAM** 30–17	4,031	

Players of the week:

Offensive		Defensive		Special teams	
Player	Team	Player	Team	Player	Team
Karel Hamilton	Samford	Kailik Williams	The Citadel	David Marvin	Wofford
**Reference: Weekly Release**

=== Week Nine ===
Date	Time	Visiting team	Home team	Site	Broadcast	Result	Attendance	Reference
October 29	1:30 PM	**Furman**	**VMI**	Alumni Memorial Stadium • Lexington, VA	ESPN3	**FUR** 24–10	5,610	
October 29	1:30 PM	**Mercer**	**Wofford**	Gibbs Stadium • Spartanburg, SC	ESPN3	**WOF** 31–21	6,190	
October 29	2:00 PM	**East Tennessee State**	**The Citadel**	Johnson Hagood Stadium • Charleston, SC	ESPN3	**CIT** 45–10	12,978	
October 29	2:30 PM	**Samford**	Mississippi State	Davis Wade Stadium • Starkville, MS	SECN	**L** 41–56	58,019	
October 29	3:30 PM	**Chattanooga**	**Western Carolina**	E. J. Whitmire Stadium • Cullowhee, NC	SDN	**UTC** 38–25	10,760	

Players of the week:

Offensive		Defensive		Special teams	
Player	Team	Player	Team	Player	Team
Detrez Newsome	Western Carolina	Paul Hunter	East Tennessee State	David Howerton	Wofford
**Reference: Weekly Release**

=== Week Ten ===
Date	Time	Visiting team	Home team	Site	Broadcast	Result	Attendance	Reference
November 5	1:30 PM	**Wofford**	**Furman**	Paladin Stadium • Greenville, SC	ESPN3	**WOF** 34–27	7,834	
November 5	2:00 PM	**Samford**	**The Citadel**	Johnson Hagood Stadium • Charleston, SC	ESPN3	**CIT** 37–34^{OT}	15,015	
November 5	2:00 PM	**VMI**	**Western Carolina**	E. J. Whitmire Stadium • Cullowhee, NC	SDN	**WCU** 32–29	8,225	
November 5	3:00 PM	**East Tennessee State**	**Mercer**	Moye Complex • Macon, GA	FSN	**MER** 21–13	10,200	

Players of the week:

Offensive		Defensive		Special teams	
Player	Team	Player	Team	Player	Team
Tyler Renew	The Citadel	Keion Crossen	Western Carolina	David Marvin	Wofford
**Reference: Weekly Release**

=== Week Eleven ===
Date	Time	Visiting team	Home team	Site	Broadcast	Result	Attendance	Reference
November 12	1:00 PM	Cumberland	**East Tennessee State**	Kermit Tipton Stadium • Johnson City, TN	SDN	**W** 23-16	6,735	
November 12	1:30 PM	**The Citadel**	**VMI**	Alumni Memorial Stadium • Lexington, VA	ESPN3	**CIT** 30-20	8,251	
November 12	2:00 PM	**Wofford**	**Chattanooga**	Finley Stadium • Chattanooga, TN	SDN	**WOF** 36-28	8,750	
November 12	3:30 PM	**Mercer**	**Samford**	Seibert Stadium • Homewood, AL	ESPN3	**SAM** 24-19	8,379	
November 12	4:00 PM	**Western Carolina**	**Furman**	Paladin Stadium • Greenville, SC	ESPN3	**FUR** 49-21	4,117	

Players of the week:

Offensive		Defensive		Special teams	
Player	Team	Player	Team	Player	Team
Devlin Hodges	Samford	Jonathan King	The Citadel	Lennox McAfee	Wofford
**Reference: Weekly Release**

=== Week Twelve ===
Date	Time	Visiting team	Home team	Site	Broadcast	Result	Attendance	Reference
November 19	1:30 PM	VMI	**Wofford**	Gibbs Stadium • Spartanburg, SC	ESPN3	**WOF** 17–0	8,102	
November 19	3:00 PM	Furman	**Mercer**	Moye Complex • Macon, GA	FSN	**MER** 27–24	10,712	
November 19	3:30 PM	Samford	**East Tennessee State**	Kermit Tipton Stadium • Johnson City, TN	SDN	**ETSU** 15–14	5,752	
November 19	3:30 PM	The Citadel	North Carolina	Kenan Memorial Stadium • Chapel Hill, NC	ACCN Extra	**L** 7–41	41,000	
November 19	7:00 PM	Chattanooga	Alabama	Bryant–Denny Stadium • Tuscaloosa, AL	TBA	**L** 3–31	101,821	
November 19	4:00 PM	Western Carolina	South Carolina	Williams-Brice Stadium • Columbia, SC	TBA	**L** 31–44	76,650	

Players of the week:
Not released

=== Week Thirteen ===
Date	Time	Visiting team	Home team	Site	Broadcast	Result	Attendance	Reference

== Records against other conferences ==
=== FCS conferences ===
Conference	Record
Big Sky	0–0
Big South	4–1
CAA	0–0
Ivy League	0–0
Independents	0–1
MEAC	0–0
MVFC	0–0
NEC	0–0
OVC	3–0
Patriot	1–0
Pioneer	1–0
Southland	1–0
SWAC	0–0
Total	10–2

=== FBS conferences ===
Conference	Record
American	0–1
ACC	0–2
Big Ten	0–1
Independents	0–0
MAC	0–1
SEC	0–3
Sun Belt	0–0
Total	0–8

== Attendance ==
Team	Stadium	Capacity	Game 1	Game 2	Game 3	Game 4	Game 5	Game 6	Total	Average	% of Capacity
Chattanooga	Finley Stadium	20,668	9,588	8,370	8,714	11,039	10,505	8,750	56,966	9,494	46%
The Citadel	Johnson Hagood Stadium	21,000	12,009 (Note: Johnson Hagood Stadium's capacity for this game was listed at 11,500 due to lead paint remediation on the East Side.)	14,590 (Note: Johnson Hagood Stadium's capacity for this game was listed at 15,000 due to lead paint remediation on the East Side.)	12,978 (Note: Johnson Hagood Stadium's capacity for this game was listed at 15,000 due to lead paint remediation on the East Side.)	15,015 (Note: Johnson Hagood Stadium's capacity for this game was listed at 16,000 due to lead paint remediation on the East Side.)			54,592	13,648	65% (Note: Average capacity is based on the full stadium size of 21,000, despite variations in the actual number of seats available for an individual game due to lead paint remediation on the East Side.)
East Tennessee State	Kermit Tipton Stadium	6,600	7,411	6,052	6,196	6,735			26,394	6,598	100%
Furman	Paladin Stadium	16,000	5,347	6,970	4,587	7,834	4,117		28,855	5,771	36%
Mercer	Moye Complex	10,200	12,542	9,772	12,247	10,200			44,761	11,190	110%
Samford	Seibert Stadium	6,700	4,482	8,509	4,085	4,031	8,379		29,486	5,897	88%
VMI	Alumni Memorial Field	10,000	5,266	5,638	5,610	8,251			24,765	6,191	62%
Western Carolina	E. J. Whitmire Stadium	13,742	11,598	12,283	9,457	8,225			41,563	10,391	76%
Wofford	Gibbs Stadium	13,000	5,417	7,316	11,102	6,190			30,025	7,506	58%

== NFL draft ==
The following list includes all SoCon players who were drafted in the 2017 NFL draft.

Round #	Pick #	NFL team	Player	Position	College
6	217	Tennessee Titans	Corey Levin	G	Chattanooga
