= 2016 Furman Paladins football team =

American college football season

2016 Furman Paladins football
- Conference: Southern Conference
- Record: 3–8 (3–5 SoCon)
- Head coach: Bruce Fowler (6th season)
- Offensive coordinator: Tim Sorrells (2nd season)
- Defensive coordinator: Kyle Gillenwater (2nd season)
- Captains: Trey Robinson; Reese Hannon; Duncan Fletcher
- Home stadium: Paladin Stadium

2016 Southern Conference football standings
	Conf.			Overall
Team	W		L	W		L
No. 10 The Citadel $^	8	–	0	10	–	2
No. 9 Wofford ^	6	–	2	10	–	4
No. 13 Chattanooga ^	6	–	2	9	–	4
No. 23 Samford ^	5	–	3	7	–	5
Mercer	4	–	4	6	–	5
Furman	3	–	5	3	–	8
East Tennessee State	2	–	6	5	–	6
Western Carolina	1	–	7	2	–	9
VMI	1	–	7	3	–	8
$ – Conference champion; ^ – FCS playoff participant; Rankings from STATS Poll

The 2016 Furman Paladins team represented Furman University as a member of the Southern Conference (SoCon) during the 2016 NCAA Division I FCS football season. Led by Bruce Fowler in his sixth and final season as head coach, the Paladins compiled an overall record of 3–8 with a mark of 3–5 in conference play, placing sixth in the SoCon. The team played home games at Paladin Stadium in Greenville, South Carolina.

Fowler resigned on December 2. He finished at Furman with a six-year record of 27–43.

== Schedule ==
Date	Time	Opponent	Site	TV	Result	Attendance
September 2	7:00 pm	at No. 12 (FBS) Michigan State*	Spartan Stadium; East Lansing, MI	BTN	L 13–28	74,516
September 10	6:00 pm	at No. 15 The Citadel	Johnson Hagood Stadium; Charleston, SC (rivalry)	ESPN3	L 14–19	12,009
September 17	7:00 pm	No. 6 Chattanooga	Paladin Stadium; Greenville, SC	ESPN3	L 14–21	5,347
September 24	6:00 pm	at No. 17 Coastal Carolina*	Brooks Stadium; Conway, SC	CSN	L 21–41	10,311
October 1	3:00 pm	Kennesaw State*	Paladin Stadium; Greenville, SC	ESPN3	L 42–52	6,970
October 8	12:00 pm	Samford	Paladin Stadium; Greenville, SC	ESPN3	L 21–38	4,587
October 15	12:00 pm	at East Tennessee State	Kermit Tipton Stadium; Johnson City, TN	SDN	W 52–7	6,052
October 29	1:30 pm	at VMI	Alumni Memorial Field; Lexington, VA	ESPN3	W 24–10	5,610
November 5	1:30 pm	Wofford^{†}	Paladin Stadium; Greenville, SC (rivalry)	ESPN3	L 27–34	7,834
November 12	4:00 pm	Western Carolina	Paladin Stadium; Greenville, SC	ESPN3	W 49–21	4,117
November 19	3:00 pm	at Mercer	Five Star Stadium; Macon, GA	FSN	L 24–27	10,712
*Non-conference game; ^{†}Homecoming; Rankings from STATS Poll released prior to the game; All times are in Eastern time

== Game summaries ==
=== At Michigan State ===
	1	2	3	4	Total
Paladins	0	3	3	7	13
#12 (FBS) Spartans	7	7	7	7	28

=== At The Citadel ===
	1	2	3	4	Total
Paladins	7	0	7	0	14
#15 Bulldogs	7	6	0	6	19

=== Chattanooga ===
	1	2	3	4	Total
#6 Mocs	0	7	14	0	21
Paladins	0	0	0	14	14

=== At Coastal Carolina ===
	1	2	3	4	Total
Paladins	0	7	7	7	21
#17 Chanticleers	7	20	7	7	41

=== Kennesaw State ===
	1	2	3	4	Total
Owls	21	28	0	3	52
Paladins	0	14	21	7	42

=== Samford ===
	1	2	3	4	Total
Bulldogs	14	10	7	7	38
Paladins	0	14	0	7	21

=== At East Tennessee State ===
	1	2	3	4	Total
Paladins	21	14	14	3	52
Buccaneers	0	0	0	7	7

=== At VMI ===
	1	2	3	4	Total
Paladins	7	10	7	0	24
Keydets	3	0	0	7	10

=== Wofford ===
	1	2	3	4	Total
Terriers	7	13	0	14	34
Paladins	6	7	14	0	27

=== Western Carolina ===
	1	2	3	4	Total
Catamounts	14	0	7	0	21
Paladins	7	6	22	14	49

=== At Mercer ===
	1	2	3	4	Total
Paladins	0	9	8	7	24
Bears	7	3	7	10	27
