= 2016 East Tennessee State Buccaneers football team =

American college football season

2016 East Tennessee State Buccaneers football
- Conference: Southern Conference
- Record: 5–6 (2–6 SoCon)
- Head coach: Carl Torbush (2nd season)
- Offensive coordinator: Mike O'Cain (2nd season)
- Defensive coordinator: Billy Taylor (2nd season)
- Home stadium: Kermit Tipton Stadium

2016 Southern Conference football standings
	Conf.			Overall
Team	W		L	W		L
No. 10 The Citadel $^	8	–	0	10	–	2
No. 9 Wofford ^	6	–	2	10	–	4
No. 13 Chattanooga ^	6	–	2	9	–	4
No. 23 Samford ^	5	–	3	7	–	5
Mercer	4	–	4	6	–	5
Furman	3	–	5	3	–	8
East Tennessee State	2	–	6	5	–	6
Western Carolina	1	–	7	2	–	9
VMI	1	–	7	3	–	8
$ – Conference champion; ^ – FCS playoff participant; Rankings from STATS Poll

The 2016 East Tennessee State Buccaneers football team represented East Tennessee State University (ETSU) in the 2016 NCAA Division I FCS football season and were in the first year of their second stint as football members of the Southern Conference (SoCon). ETSU had originally joined the SoCon in 1978, with football joining in 1979, but dropped the sport after the 2003 season and left the conference entirely in 2005. ETSU returned to the SoCon as a full but non-football member in 2014, at that time announcing that the school would reinstate football with play beginning in the 2015 season. The Buccaneers played that season as an FCS independent.

They were led by second-year head coach Carl Torbush and played all but one of their home games at Kermit Tipton Stadium. The other home game, the Buccaneers' first SoCon game since 2003, was held at the nearby Bristol Motor Speedway on September 17. The game was played on a temporary grass surface that will be laid down from the Tennessee–Virginia Tech game to be held one week earlier. They finished the season 5–6, 2–6 in SoCon play to finish in seventh place.

== Schedule ==
Date	Time	Opponent	Site	TV	Result	Attendance
September 3	7:00 pm	at Kennesaw State*	Fifth Third Bank Stadium; Kennesaw, GA	WPCH	W 20–17 ^{2OT}	8,574
September 17	1:30 pm	vs. Western Carolina	Bristol Motor Speedway; Bristol, TN	ESPN3	W 34–31	13,863
September 24	1:30 pm	at Wofford	Gibbs Stadium; Spartanburg, SC	ESPN3	L 0–31	7,316
October 1	12:00 pm	No. 5 Chattanooga	Kermit Tipton Stadium; Johnson City, TN	SDN	L 7–37	7,411
October 8	1:30 pm	at VMI	Alumni Memorial Field; Lexington, VA	ESPN3	L 7–37	5,638
October 15	12:00 pm	Furman	Kermit Tipton Stadium; Johnson City, TN	SDN	L 7–52	6,052
October 20	7:30 pm	West Virginia Wesleyan*	Kermit Tipton Stadium; Johnson City, TN	SDN	W 38–7	6,196
October 29	2:00 pm	at No. 5 The Citadel	Johnson Hagood Stadium; Charleston, SC	ESPN3	L 10–45	12,978
November 5	3:00 pm	at Mercer	Moye Complex; Macon, GA	FSN	L 13–21	10,913
November 12	1:00 pm	Cumberland (TN)*^{†}	Kermit Tipton Stadium; Johnson City, TN	SDN	W 23–16	6,735
November 19	3:30 pm	No. 18 Samford	Kermit Tipton Stadium; Johnson City, TN	SDN	W 15–14	5,752
*Non-conference game; ^{†}Homecoming; Rankings from STATS Poll released prior to the game; All times are in Eastern time

== Game summaries ==
=== At Kennesaw State ===
	1	2	3	4	OT	2OT	Total
Buccaneers	0	3	7	0	7	3	20
Owls	0	7	0	3	7	0	17

=== Vs. Western Carolina ===
	1	2	3	4	Total
Catamounts	7	14	0	10	31
Buccaneers	0	10	14	10	34

=== At Wofford ===
	1	2	3	4	Total
Buccaneers	0	0	0	0	0
Terriers	14	0	7	10	31

=== Chattanooga ===
	1	2	3	4	Total
#5 Mocs	3	14	14	6	37
Buccaneers	0	0	0	7	7

=== At VMI ===
	1	2	3	4	Total
Buccaneers	0	0	0	7	7
Keydets	14	13	3	7	37

=== Furman ===
	1	2	3	4	Total
Paladins	21	14	14	3	52
Buccaneers	0	0	0	7	7

=== West Virginia Wesleyan ===
	1	2	3	4	Total
Bobcats	0	7	0	0	7
Buccaneers	7	14	17	0	38

=== At The Citadel ===
	1	2	3	4	Total
Buccaneers	0	7	3	0	10
#5 Bulldogs	14	17	0	14	45

=== At Mercer ===
	1	2	3	4	Total
Buccaneers	0	0	13	0	13
Bears	0	7	0	14	21

=== Cumberland ===
	1	2	3	4	Total
Phoenix	7	9	0	0	16
Buccaneers	7	16	0	0	23

=== Samford ===
	1	2	3	4	Total
#18 Bulldogs	7	0	7	0	14
Buccaneers	0	3	6	6	15
