= 2016 Samford Bulldogs football team =

American college football season

2016 Samford Bulldogs football

FCS playoffs first round, L 24–38 vs. Youngstown State
- Conference: Southern Conference

Ranking
- STATS: No. 23
- FCS Coaches: No. 23
- Record: 7–5 (5–3 SoCon)
- Head coach: Chris Hatcher (2nd season)
- Offensive coordinator: Russ Callaway (1st season)
- Offensive scheme: Air raid
- Defensive coordinator: Bill D'Ottavio (10th season)
- Base defense: 4–3
- Home stadium: Seibert Stadium

2016 Southern Conference football standings
	Conf.			Overall
Team	W		L	W		L
No. 10 The Citadel $^	8	–	0	10	–	2
No. 9 Wofford ^	6	–	2	10	–	4
No. 13 Chattanooga ^	6	–	2	9	–	4
No. 23 Samford ^	5	–	3	7	–	5
Mercer	4	–	4	6	–	5
Furman	3	–	5	3	–	8
East Tennessee State	2	–	6	5	–	6
Western Carolina	1	–	7	2	–	9
VMI	1	–	7	3	–	8
$ – Conference champion; ^ – FCS playoff participant; Rankings from STATS Poll

The 2016 Samford Bulldogs football team represented Samford University in the 2016 NCAA Division I FCS football season. They were led by ssecond-yearhead coach Chris Hatcher and played their home games at Seibert Stadium. They were a member of the Southern Conference. They finished the season 7–5, 5–3 in SoCon play to finish in fourth place. They received an at-large bid to the FCS Playoffs where they lost to Youngstown State in the first round.

== Schedule ==
Date	Time	Opponent	Rank	Site	TV	Result	Attendance
September 1	6:00 pm	Mars Hill*		Seibert Stadium; Homewood, AL	ESPN3	W 77–7	4,482
September 10	6:00 pm	at Central Arkansas*		Estes Stadium; Conway, AR	BNN	W 35–29	9,987
September 24	1:00 pm	at No. 5 Chattanooga		Finley Stadium; Chattanooga, TN	SDN	L 21–41	8,714
October 1	2:00 pm	Wofford		Seibert Stadium; Homewood, AL	ESPN3	W 28–26	8,509
October 8	12:00 pm	at Furman		Paladin Stadium; Greenville, SC	ESPN3	W 38–21	4,587
October 15	2:00 pm	VMI	No. 24	Seibert Stadium; Homewood, AL	ESPN3	W 55–21	4,085
October 22	6:00 pm	Western Carolina	No. 21	Seibert Stadium; Homewood, AL	ASN	W 30–17	4,031
October 29	2:30 pm	at Mississippi State*	No. 20	Davis Wade Stadium; Starkville, MS	SECN	L 41–56	58,019
November 5	1:00 pm	at No. 5 The Citadel	No. 20	Johnson Hagood Stadium; Charleston, SC	ESPN3	L 34–37 ^{OT}	15,015
November 12	2:30 pm	Mercer^{†}	No. 22	Seibert Stadium; Homewood, AL	ESPN3	W 24–19	8,379
November 19	2:30 pm	at East Tennessee State	No. 18	Kermit Tipton Stadium; Johnson City, TN	SDN	L 14–15	5,752
November 26	4:00 pm	at No. 13 Youngstown State*	No. 23	Stambaugh Stadium; Youngstown, OH (NCAA Division I first round)	ESPN3	L 24–38	5,322
*Non-conference game; ^{†}Homecoming; Rankings from STATS Poll released prior to the game; All times are in Central time

== Ranking movements ==
Ranking movements Legend: ██ Increase in ranking ██ Decrease in ranking RV = Received votes
	Week													
Poll	Pre	1	2	3	4	5	6	7	8	9	10	11	12	Final
STATS FCS	RV	RV	RV	RV	RV	RV	24	21	20	20	22	18	23	23
Coaches	RV	RV	RV	RV	RV	RV	24	20	19	18	21	18	24	23

== Game summaries ==
=== Mars Hill ===
Mars Hill at Samford

Team	1	2	3	4	Total
Mountain Lions	0	7	0	0	7
• Bulldogs	14	14	21	28	77

- Date: September 1
- Location: Seibert Stadium
  Homewood, Alabama
- Game start: 6:00 PM CDT
- Game attendance: 4,482
- Game weather: Partly cloudy, 90 °F (32 °C)
- Referee: Bob Johnson
- Television network: ESPN3

Statistics	MAR	SAM
First downs	8	36
Total yards	136	573
Rushing yards	48	221
Passing yards	88	352
Turnovers	3	2
Time of possession	27:14	32:46

Team	Category	Player	Statistics
Mars Hill	Passing	Austin Brown	6/10, 68 yards, TD
Mars Hill	Rushing	Jamel Harbison	17 rushes, 27 yards
Mars Hill	Receiving	Craig Rucker	5 receptions, 62 yards, TD
Samford	Passing	Devlin Hodges	39/49, 313 yards, 5 TD
Samford	Rushing	Roland Adams	13 rushes, 89 yards, TD
Samford	Receiving	TaDarryl Marshall	14 receptions, 100 yards, TD

=== At Central Arkansas ===
Samford at Central Arkansas

Team	1	2	3	4	Total
• Bulldogs	7	21	7	0	35
Bears	3	7	0	19	29

- Date: September 10
- Location: Estes Stadium
  Conway, Arkansas
- Game start: 6:00 PM CDT
- Game attendance: 9,987

Statistics	SAM	UCA
First downs	11	36
Total yards	257	577
Rushing yards	-25	231
Passing yards	282	346
Turnovers	1	3
Time of possession	23:14	36:46

Team	Category	Player	Statistics
Samford	Passing	Devlin Hodges	23/35, 282 yards, 3 TD, INT
Samford	Rushing	Kelvin McKnight	1 carry, 7 yards
Samford	Receiving	Kelvin McKnight	7 receptions, 108 yards, TD
Central Arkansas	Passing	Hayden Hildebrand	26/48, 346 yards, TD, 2 INT
Central Arkansas	Rushing	Carlos Blackman	28 rushes, 123 yards, TD
Central Arkansas	Receiving	Jatavious Wilson	9 receptions, 134 yards

=== At No. 5 Chattanooga ===
Samford at Chattanooga

Team	1	2	3	4	Total
Bulldogs	0	7	7	7	21
• No. 5 Mocs	7	14	10	10	41

- Date: September 24
- Location: Finley Stadium
  Chattanooga, Tennessee
- Game start: 1:00 PM CDT
- Game attendance: 8,714
- Game weather: Mostly sunny, 84 °F (29 °C)
- Television network: SDN

Statistics	SAM	CHAT
First downs	19	22
Total yards	389	518
Rushing yards	46	282
Passing yards	343	236
Turnovers	3	2
Time of possession	20:42	39:18

Team	Category	Player	Statistics
Samford	Passing	Devlin Hodges	28/45, 314 yards, 2 TD, INT
Samford	Rushing	Krondis Larry	5 rushes, 25 yards
Samford	Receiving	Kelvin McKnight	9 receptions, 143 yards, 2 TD
Chattanooga	Passing	Alejandro Bennifield	19/34, 236 yards, 2 TD, INT
Chattanooga	Rushing	Derrick Craine	23 rushes, 222 yards, 2 TD
Chattanooga	Receiving	Xavier Borishade	5 receptions, 79 yards, TD

=== Wofford ===
Wofford at Samford

Team	1	2	3	4	Total
Terriers	7	10	3	6	26
• Bulldogs	7	14	0	7	28

- Date: October 1
- Location: Seibert Stadium
  Homewood, Alabama
- Game start: 2:00 PM CDT
- Game attendance: 8,509
- Television network: ESPN3/SDN

Statistics	WOF	SAM
First downs		
Total yards		
Rushing yards		
Passing yards		
Turnovers		
Time of possession		

Team	Category	Player	Statistics
Wofford	Passing		
Wofford	Rushing		
Wofford	Receiving		
Samford	Passing		
Samford	Rushing		
Samford	Receiving		

=== At Furman ===
Samford at Furman

Team	1	2	3	4	Total
• Bulldogs	14	10	7	7	38
Paladins	0	14	0	7	21

- Date: October 8
- Location: Paladin Stadium
  Greenville, South Carolina
- Game start: 12:00 PM CDT
- Game attendance: 4,587
- Television network: ESPN3

Statistics	SAM	FUR
First downs		
Total yards		
Rushing yards		
Passing yards		
Turnovers		
Time of possession		

Team	Category	Player	Statistics
Samford	Passing		
Samford	Rushing		
Samford	Receiving		
Furman	Passing		
Furman	Rushing		
Furman	Receiving		

=== VMI ===
VMI at Samford

Team	1	2	3	4	Total
Keydets	7	7	7	0	21
• No. 24 Bulldogs	28	10	0	17	55

- Date: October 15
- Location: Seibert Stadium
  Homewood, Alabama
- Game start: 2:00 PM CDT
- Game attendance: 4,085
- Television network: ESPN3

Statistics	VMI	SAM
First downs		
Total yards		
Rushing yards		
Passing yards		
Turnovers		
Time of possession		

Team	Category	Player	Statistics
VMI	Passing		
VMI	Rushing		
VMI	Receiving		
Samford	Passing		
Samford	Rushing		
Samford	Receiving		

=== Western Carolina ===
Western Carolina at Samford

Team	1	2	3	4	Total
Catamounts	7	0	3	7	17
• No. 21 Bulldogs	7	6	14	3	30

- Date: October 22
- Location: Seibert Stadium
  Homewood, Alabama
- Game start: 6:00 PM CDT
- Game attendance: 4,031
- Television network: ASN

Statistics	WCU	SAM
First downs		
Total yards		
Rushing yards		
Passing yards		
Turnovers		
Time of possession		

Team	Category	Player	Statistics
Western Carolina	Passing		
Western Carolina	Rushing		
Western Carolina	Receiving		
Samford	Passing		
Samford	Rushing		
Samford	Receiving		

=== At Mississippi State ===
Samford at Mississippi State

Team	1	2	3	4	Total
No. 20 SAM Bulldogs	13	7	13	8	41
• MSST Bulldogs	21	7	21	7	56

- Date: October 29
- Location: Davis Wade Stadium
  Starkville, Mississippi
- Game start: 2:30 PM CDT
- Game attendance: 58,019
- Television network: SECN

Statistics	SAM	MSST
First downs		
Total yards		
Rushing yards		
Passing yards		
Turnovers		
Time of possession		

Team	Category	Player	Statistics
Samford	Passing		
Samford	Rushing		
Samford	Receiving		
Mississippi State	Passing		
Mississippi State	Rushing		
Mississippi State	Receiving		

=== At No. 5 The Citadel ===
Samford at The Citadel

Team	1	2	3	4	OT	Total
No. 20 SAM Bulldogs	7	13	0	14	0	34
• No. 5 CIT Bulldogs	7	7	7	13	3	37

- Date: November 5
- Location: Johnson Hagood Stadium
  Charleston, South Carolina
- Game start: 1:00 PM CDT
- Game attendance: 15,015
- Television network: ESPN3

Statistics	SAM	CIT
First downs		
Total yards		
Rushing yards		
Passing yards		
Turnovers		
Time of possession		

Team	Category	Player	Statistics
Samford	Passing		
Samford	Rushing		
Samford	Receiving		
The Citadel	Passing		
The Citadel	Rushing		
The Citadel	Receiving		

=== Mercer ===
Mercer at Samford

Team	1	2	3	4	Total
Bears	0	10	0	9	19
• No. 22 Bulldogs	21	0	0	3	24

- Date: November 12
- Location: Seibert Stadium
  Homewood, Alabama
- Game start: 2:30 PM CST
- Game attendance: 8,379
- Television network: ESPN3

Statistics	MER	SAM
First downs		
Total yards		
Rushing yards		
Passing yards		
Turnovers		
Time of possession		

Team	Category	Player	Statistics
Mercer	Passing		
Mercer	Rushing		
Mercer	Receiving		
Samford	Passing		
Samford	Rushing		
Samford	Receiving		

=== At East Tennessee State ===
Samford at East Tennessee State

Team	1	2	3	4	Total
No. 18 Bulldogs	7	0	7	0	14
• Buccaneers	0	3	6	6	15

- Date: November 19
- Location: Kermit Tipton Stadium
  Johnson City, Tennessee
- Game start: 2:30 PM CST
- Game attendance: 5,752
- Television network: SDN

Statistics	SAM	ETSU
First downs		
Total yards		
Rushing yards		
Passing yards		
Turnovers		
Time of possession		

Team	Category	Player	Statistics
Samford	Passing		
Samford	Rushing		
Samford	Receiving		
East Tennessee State	Passing		
East Tennessee State	Rushing		
East Tennessee State	Receiving		

=== At No. 13 Youngstown State (NCAA Division I first round) ===
Samford at Youngstown State

Team	1	2	3	4	Total
No. 23 Bulldogs	7	0	0	17	24
• No. 13 Penguins	7	3	14	14	38

- Date: November 26
- Location: Stambaugh Stadium
  Youngstown, Ohio
- Game start: 4:00 PM CST
- Game attendance: 5,322
- Television network: ESPN3

Statistics	SAM	YSU
First downs		
Total yards		
Rushing yards		
Passing yards		
Turnovers		
Time of possession		

Team	Category	Player	Statistics
Samford	Passing		
Samford	Rushing		
Samford	Receiving		
Youngstown State	Passing		
Youngstown State	Rushing		
Youngstown State	Receiving		
