= 2016 Chattanooga Mocs football team =

American college football season

2016 Chattanooga Mocs football

NCAA Division I Second Round, L 36–41 vs. Sam Houston State
- Conference: Southern Conference

Ranking
- STATS: No. 13
- FCS Coaches: No. 10
- Record: 9–4 (6–2 SoCon)
- Head coach: Russ Huesman (8th season)
- Offensive coordinator: Jeff Durden (4th season)
- Defensive coordinator: Adam Braithwaite (4th season)
- Home stadium: Finley Stadium

2016 Southern Conference football standings
	Conf.			Overall
Team	W		L	W		L
No. 10 The Citadel $^	8	–	0	10	–	2
No. 9 Wofford ^	6	–	2	10	–	4
No. 13 Chattanooga ^	6	–	2	9	–	4
No. 23 Samford ^	5	–	3	7	–	5
Mercer	4	–	4	6	–	5
Furman	3	–	5	3	–	8
East Tennessee State	2	–	6	5	–	6
Western Carolina	1	–	7	2	–	9
VMI	1	–	7	3	–	8
$ – Conference champion; ^ – FCS playoff participant; Rankings from STATS Poll

The 2016 Chattanooga Mocs football team represented the University of Tennessee at Chattanooga in the 2016 NCAA Division I FCS football season as a member of the Southern Conference (SoCon). The Mocs were led by eighth-year head coach Russ Huesman and played their home games at Finley Stadium in Chattanooga, Tennessee. They finished the season 9–4 overall and 6–2 in SoCon play to tie for second place. They received an at-large bid to the NCAA Division I Football Championship playoffs, where they defeated Weber State in the first round before losing to Sam Houston State in the second round.

== Schedule ==
Date	Time	Opponent	Rank	Site	TV	Result	Attendance
September 1	7:00 pm	Shorter*	No. 6	Finley Stadium; Chattanooga, TN	SDN	W 66–0	9,588
September 10	2:00 pm	Presbyterian*	No. 6	Finley Stadium; Chattanooga, TN	SDN	W 34–0	8,370
September 17	7:00 pm	at Furman	No. 6	Paladin Stadium; Greenville, SC	ESPN3	W 21–14	5,347
September 24	2:00 pm	Samford	No. 5	Finley Stadium; Chattanooga, TN	SDN	W 41–21	8,714
October 1	12:00 pm	at East Tennessee State	No. 5	Kermit Tipton Stadium; Johnson City, TN	SDN	W 37–7	7,411
October 8	4:00 pm	Mercer	No. 5	Finley Stadium; Chattanooga, TN	SDN	W 52–31	11,039
October 15	3:00 pm	at No. 8 The Citadel	No. 5	Johnson Hagood Stadium; Charleston, SC	FSN	L 14–22	14,590
October 22	2:00 pm	VMI	No. 11	Finley Stadium; Chattanooga, TN	SDN	W 30–13	10,505
October 29	3:30 pm	at Western Carolina	No. 10	E. J. Whitmire Stadium; Cullowhee, NC	SDN	W 38–25	10,760
November 12	2:00 pm	Wofford	No. 7	Finley Stadium; Chattanooga, TN	SDN	L 28–36	8,750
November 19	7:00 pm	at No. 1 (FBS) Alabama*	No. 12	Bryant–Denny Stadium; Tuscaloosa, AL	ESPN2	L 3–31	101,821
November 26	2:00 pm	No. 25 Weber State*	No. 11	Finley Stadium; Chattanooga, TN (FCS Playoffs First Round)	ESPN3	W 45–14	5,238
December 3	3:00 pm	at No. 1 Sam Houston State*	No. 11	Bowers Stadium; Huntsville, TX (FCS Playoffs Second Round)	ESPN3	L 36–41	4,897
*Non-conference game; Rankings from STATS Poll released prior to the game; All times are in Eastern time

== Game summaries ==
=== Shorter ===
	1	2	3	4	Total
Hawks	0	0	0	0	0
#6 Mocs	24	21	14	7	66

=== At Presbyterian ===
	1	2	3	4	Total
Blue Hose	0	0	0	0	0
#6 Mocs	7	13	14	0	34

=== At Furman ===
	1	2	3	4	Total
#6 Mocs	0	7	14	0	21
Paladins	0	0	0	14	14

=== Samford ===
	1	2	3	4	Total
Bulldogs	0	7	7	7	21
#5 Mocs	7	14	10	10	41

=== At East Tennessee State ===
	1	2	3	4	Total
#5 Mocs	3	14	14	6	37
Buccaneers	0	0	0	7	7

=== Mercer ===
	1	2	3	4	Total
Bears	3	0	14	14	31
#5 Mocs	14	24	14	0	52

=== At The Citadel ===
	1	2	3	4	Total
#5 Mocs	7	7	0	0	14
#8 Bulldogs	7	10	2	3	22

=== VMI ===
	1	2	3	4	Total
Keydets	0	0	13	0	13
#11 Mocs	7	10	6	7	30

=== At Western Carolina ===
	1	2	3	4	Total
#10 Mocs	14	17	7	0	38
Catamounts	10	0	7	8	25

=== Wofford ===
	1	2	3	4	Total
Terriers	10	16	7	3	36
#7 Mocs	14	7	0	7	28

=== At Alabama ===
	1	2	3	4	Total
#12 Mocs	3	0	0	0	3
#1 (FBS) Crimson Tide	0	14	7	10	31

== FCS Playoffs ==
=== First Round–Weber State ===
	1	2	3	4	Total
#25 Wildcats	0	0	7	7	14
#11 Mocs	14	10	7	14	45

=== Second Round–Sam Houston State ===
	1	2	3	4	Total
#11 Mocs	0	14	10	12	36
#1 Bearkats	14	7	14	6	41

== Ranking movements ==
Ranking movements Legend: ██ Increase in ranking ██ Decrease in ranking — = Not ranked
	Week													
Poll	Pre	1	2	3	4	5	6	7	8	9	10	11	12	Final
STATS	6	6	6	5	5	5	5	11	10	9	7	12	11	13
Coaches	7	6	4	3	3	3	3	8	8	8	7	11	9	10
FCS Playoffs	Not released									8	7	—	Not released	

== NFL Draft Selections ==
Year	Round	Overall	Player	Team	Position
2017	6	217	Corey Levin	Tennessee Titans	G
