= 2016 The Citadel Bulldogs football team =

American college football season

2016 The Citadel Bulldogs football

SoCon champion

NCAA Division I second round, L 3–17 vs. Wofford
- Conference: Southern Conference

Ranking
- STATS: No. 10
- FCS Coaches: No. 9
- Record: 10–2 (8–0 SoCon)
- Head coach: Brent Thompson (1st season)
- Offensive coordinator: Lou Conte (1st season)
- Offensive scheme: Triple option
- Defensive coordinator: Blake Harrell (1st season)
- Base defense: 4–3
- Home stadium: Johnson Hagood Stadium

2016 Southern Conference football standings
	Conf.			Overall
Team	W		L	W		L
No. 10 The Citadel $^	8	–	0	10	–	2
No. 9 Wofford ^	6	–	2	10	–	4
No. 13 Chattanooga ^	6	–	2	9	–	4
No. 23 Samford ^	5	–	3	7	–	5
Mercer	4	–	4	6	–	5
Furman	3	–	5	3	–	8
East Tennessee State	2	–	6	5	–	6
Western Carolina	1	–	7	2	–	9
VMI	1	–	7	3	–	8
$ – Conference champion; ^ – FCS playoff participant; Rankings from STATS Poll

The 2016 The Citadel Bulldogs football team represented The Citadel, The Military College of South Carolina in the 2016 NCAA Division I FCS football season. The Bulldogs were led by first-year head coach Brent Thompson and played their home games at Johnson Hagood Stadium. They played as members of the Southern Conference, as they have since 1936.

With their win over Samford on November 4, the Bulldogs clinched their second consecutive, and fourth overall, SoCon championship. By virtue of their victory over VMI on November 12, 2016, The Citadel completed their first undefeated SoCon season in program history and claimed the championship outright. The win over VMI also marked the second time in program history that the Bulldogs earned double digit wins in one season, after winning 11 games in 1992.

They finished the season 10–2, 8–0 in SoCon play to win the SoCon title. They received the SoCon's automatic bid to the FCS Playoffs where they lost in the second round to Wofford.

== Schedule ==
The Bulldogs planned to host North Greenville for their traditional Parents' Day game on October 8. Due to Hurricane Matthew, the game against North Greenville took place at NGU's Younts Stadium in Tigerville, South Carolina on Thursday, October 6.

Date	Time	Opponent	Rank	Site	TV	Result	Attendance
September 1	7:00 pm	at Mercer	No. 15	Moye Complex; Macon, GA	FSN	W 24–23	12,542
September 10	6:00 pm	Furman	No. 15	Johnson Hagood Stadium; Charleston, SC (rivalry)	ESPN3	W 19–14	12,009
September 17	6:00 pm	at Gardner–Webb*	No. 15	Ernest W. Spangler Stadium; Boiling Springs, NC	BSN	W 31–24	6,850
October 1	3:30 pm	at Western Carolina	No. 9	Bob Waters Field at E. J. Whitmire Stadium; Cullowhee, NC	ESPN3	W 37–14	12,283
October 6	7:00 pm	at North Greenville*	No. 9	Younts Stadium; Tigerville, SC	ESPN3	W 38–14	5,435
October 15	3:00 pm	No. 5 Chattanooga	No. 8	Johnson Hagood Stadium; Charleston, SC	FSN	W 22–14	14,590
October 22	1:30 pm	at Wofford	No. 5	Gibbs Stadium; Spartanburg, SC (rivalry)	ESPN3	W 24–21 ^{OT}	11,102
October 29	2:00 pm	East Tennessee State	No. 5	Johnson Hagood Stadium; Charleston, SC	ESPN3	W 45–10	12,978
November 5	2:00 pm	No. 20 Samford^{†}	No. 5	Johnson Hagood Stadium; Charleston, SC	ESPN3	W 37–34 ^{OT}	15,015
November 12	1:30 pm	at VMI	No. 5	Alumni Memorial Field; Lexington, VA (Military Classic of the South)	ESPN3	W 30–20	8,251
November 19	3:30 pm	at North Carolina*	No. 5	Kenan Memorial Stadium; Chapel Hill, NC	ACCN+	L 7–41	41,000
December 3	6:00 pm	No. 19 Wofford*	No. 6	Johnson Hagood Stadium; Charleston, SC (NCAA Division I second round)	ESPN3	L 3–17	10,336
*Non-conference game; ^{†}Homecoming; Rankings from STATS Poll released prior to the game; All times are in Eastern time

== Stadium issues ==
In 2016, The Citadel determined that lead paint needed remediation on the east (visitor's) side of Johnson Hagood Stadium. The work resulted in the entire east side being closed for the first game of the season against Furman and some sections being opened for subsequent games. The capacity was thus 10,500 for the first game and about 15,000 for later games.

== Game summaries ==
=== Mercer ===
Team	1	2	3	4	Total
• #15 Bulldogs	21	0	0	3	24
Bears	10	10	3	0	23

- Date: September 1, 2016
- Location: Moye Complex, Macon, GA
- Game start: 7:00 PM EST
- Elapsed time: 2:49
- Game attendance: 12,542
- Game weather: 86°F • ESE 12 • Mostly cloudy
- Referee: Larry Saunders
- TV announcers (FSN): Darren Goldwater, Ray Goff, Lyndsay Rowley

Scoring summary
1	14:21	CIT	Tyler Renew 70-yard run (Cody Clark kick)	CIT 7–0
1	12:59	CIT	Cam Jackson 8-yard run (Clark kick)	CIT 14–0
1	7:44	MER	Cole Fisher 26-yard field goal	CIT 14–3
1	5:46	CIT	Reggie Williams 29-yard run (Clark kick)	CIT 21–3
1	3:08	MER	John Russ 38-yard run (Fisher kick)	CIT 21–10
2	11:21	MER	Fisher 31-yard field goal	CIT 21–13
2	6:46	MER	Russ 1-yard run (Fisher kick)	CIT 21–20
3	1:33	MER	Fisher 47-yard field goal	MER 23–21
4	8:16	CIT	Clark 35-yard field goal	CIT 24–23

=== Furman ===
Team	1	2	3	4	Total
Paladins	7	0	7	0	14
• #15 Bulldogs	7	6	0	6	19

- Date: September 10, 2016
- Location: Johnson Hagood Stadium, Charleston, SC
- Game start: 6:00 PM EST
- Elapsed time: 2:53
- Game attendance: 12,009
- Referee: Marshall Lewis
- TV announcers (ESPN3): Kevin Fitzgerald, Saddath Jean-Pierre

Scoring summary
1	12:38	FUR	Andrej Suttles 12-yard pass from P.J. Blazejowski (Jon Croft Hollingsworth kick)	FUR 7–0
1	5:05	CIT	Jordan Black 1-yard run (Cody Clark kick)	7–7
2	4:04	CIT	Black 1-yard run (Clark kick failed)	CIT 13–7
3	1:19	FUR	Blazejowski 1-yard run (Hollingsworth kick)	FUR 14–13
4	2:13	CIT	Dominique Allen 1-yard run (two-point run conv. failed)	CIT 19–14

=== Gardner–Webb ===
Team	1	2	3	4	Total
• #15 Bulldogs	7	7	7	10	31
Runnin' Bulldogs	7	3	7	7	24

- Date: September 17, 2016
- Location: Ernest W. Spangler Stadium, Boiling Springs, NC
- Game start: 6:00 PM EST
- Elapsed time: 2:34
- Game attendance: 6,850
- Game weather: 83°F • SE 4 • 48% humidity
- Referee: Henry Johns
- TV announcers (BSN): Fabian Fuentes, Alex Guest

Scoring summary
1	11:22	GW	Jonathan Blackmon 39-yard run (Paul Schumacher kick)	GW 7–0
1	6:50	CIT	Jordan Black 1-yard run (Cody Clark kick)	7–7
2	13:49	GW	Schumacher 27-yard field goal	GW 10–7
2	2:44	CIT	Rod Johnson 7-yard run (Clark kick)	CIT 14–10
3	4:05	GW	Khalil Lewis 28-yard run (Schumacher kick)	GW 17–14
3	0:00	CIT	DeAndre Schoultz 81-yard punt return (Clark kick)	CIT 21–17
4	8:10	GW	Willie Jackson IV 19-yard pass from Tyrell Maxwell (Schumacher kick)	GW 24–21
4	2:51	CIT	Dominique Allen 1-yard run (Clark kick)	CIT 28–24
4	0:26	CIT	Clark 45-yard field goal	CIT 31–24

=== Western Carolina ===
Team	1	2	3	4	Total
• #9 Bulldogs	7	20	7	3	37
Catamounts	0	0	7	7	14

- Date: October 1, 2016
- Location: Bob Waters Field at E. J. Whitmire Stadium, Cullowhee, NC
- Game start: 3:30 PM EST
- Elapsed time: 3:11
- Game attendance: 12,283
- Game weather: Low 70s • W 4 • Sunny
- Referee: Larry Saunders
- TV announcers (ESPN3): Pete Yanity, Will Merritt

Scoring summary
1	2:49	CIT	Rod Johnson 31-yard run (Cody Clark kick)	CIT 7–0
2	10:50	CIT	Johnson 1-yard run (Clark kick)	CIT 14–0
2	6:46	CIT	Rudder Brown 5-yard pass from Jordan Black (two-point run conv. failed)	CIT 21–0
2	3:11	CIT	Tyler Renew 75-yard pass from Cam Jackson (Clark kick)	CIT 28–0
3	8:23	CIT	Johnson 15-yard run (Clark kick)	CIT 34–0
3	1:36	WCU	Tyrie Adams 7-yard run (Logan Howard kick)	CIT 34–7
4	11:43	WCU	Detrez Newsome 65-yard run (Logan Howard kick)	CIT 34–14
4	4:32	CIT	Clark 33-yard field goal	CIT 37–14

=== North Greenville ===
Team	1	2	3	4	Total
• #9 Bulldogs	7	14	14	3	38
Crusaders	7	7	0	0	14

- Date: October 6, 2016
- Location: Younts Stadium, Tigerville, SC
- Game start: 7:00 PM EST
- Elapsed time: 2:48
- Game attendance: 5,435
- Game weather: 71°F • NE 8 • Sunny
- Referee: Thomas Graham
- TV announcers (ESPN3): Kevin Fitzgerald, Sadath Jean-Pierre

Scoring summary
1	11:22	NGR	Javon Smith 99-yard pass from Will Hunter (Matt Gravely kick)	NGR 7–0
1	6:50	CIT	Reggie Williams 17-yard run (Cody Clark kick)	7–7
2	14:17	CIT	Rod Johnson 49-yard run (Clark kick)	CIT 14–7
2	5:39	NGR	Smith 90-yard pass from Hunter (Gravely kick)	14–14
2	5:29	CIT	Cam Jackson 52-yard run (Clark kick)	CIT 21–14
3	6:48	CIT	Dominique Allen 15-yard run (Clark kick)	CIT 28–14
3	0:10	CIT	Williams 30-yard pass from Allen (Cody Clark kick)	CIT 35–14
4	10:16	CIT	Clark 31-yard field goal	CIT 38–14

=== Chattanooga ===
Team	1	2	3	4	Total
#5 Mocs	7	7	0	0	14
• #8 Bulldogs	7	10	2	3	22

- Date: October 15, 2016
- Location: Johnson Hagood Stadium, Charleston, SC
- Game start: 3:00 PM EST
- Elapsed time: 2:44
- Game attendance: 14,590
- Referee: Bob Johnson
- TV announcers (FSN): Kevin Fitzgerald, Sadath Jean-Pierre

Scoring summary
1	5:00	CIT	Dominique Allen 1-yard run (Cody Clark kick)	CIT 7–0
1	4:49	CHA	C.J. Board 75-yard pass from Alejandro Bennifield (Henrique Ribeiro kick)	7–7
2	10:16	CIT	Allen 1-yard run (Clark kick)	CIT 14–7
2	3:41	CHA	Derrick Craine 1-yard run (Ribeiro kick)	14–14
2	0:00	CIT	Clark 37-yard field goal	CIT 17–14
3	0:00	CIT	Team Safety	CIT 19–14
4	0:24	CIT	Clark 32-yard field goal	CIT 22–14

=== Wofford ===
Team	1	2	3	4	OT	Total
• #5 Bulldogs	0	0	7	14	3	24
Terriers	7	3	3	8	0	21

- Date: October 22, 2016
- Location: Gibbs Stadium, Spartanburg, SC
- Game start: 1:30 PM EST
- Elapsed time: 3:12
- Game attendance: 11,102
- Referee: Larry Adcock
- TV announcers (ESPN3): Mark Hauser, Thom Henson

Scoring summary
1	2:30	WOF	Chase Nelson 1-yard run (David Marvin kick)	WOF 7–0
2	0:00	WOF	Marvin 41-yard field goal	WOF 10–0
3	6:46	WOF	Marvin 39-yard field goal	WOF 13–0
3	1:33	CIT	Reggie Williams 34-yard run (Cody Clark kick)	WOF 13–7
4	12:55	CIT	Dominique Allen 1-yard run (Clark kick)	CIT 14–13
4	8:09	WOF	Lennox McAfee 16-yard run (Chandler Gouger pass from Brandon Goodson)	WOF 21–14
4	5:57	CIT	Kailik Williams 13-yard interception return (Clark kick)	21–21
OT		CIT	Clark 21-yard field goal	CIT 24–21

=== East Tennessee State ===
Team	1	2	3	4	Total
Buccaneers	0	7	3	0	10
• #5 Bulldogs	14	17	0	14	45

- Date: October 29, 2016
- Location: Johnson Hagood Stadium, Charleston, SC
- Game start: 2:00 PM EST
- Elapsed time: 2:56
- Game attendance: 12,978
- Referee: Marshall Lewis
- TV announcers (ESPN3): Kevin Fitzgerald, Sadath Jean-Pierre

Scoring summary
1	10:32	CIT	Cam Jackson 1-yard run (Cody Clark kick)	CIT 7–0
1	8:14	CIT	Jorian Jordan 5-yard pass from Dominique Allen (Clark kick)	CIT 14–0
2	14:11	CIT	Reggie Williams 11-yard run (Clark kick)	CIT 21–0
2	7:41	ETSU	Haddon Hill 3-yard pass from Austin Herink (J.J. Jerman kick)	CIT 21–7
2	6:47	CIT	Jackson 38-yard run (Clark kick)	CIT 28–7
2	0:07	CIT	Cody Clark 29-yard field goal	CIT 31–7
3	2:33	ETSU	Jerman 22-yard field goal	CIT 31–10
4	13:24	CIT	Jordan Black 2-yard run (Clark kick)	CIT 38–10
4	8:04	CIT	Jonathan Dorogy 3-yard run (Clark kick)	CIT 45–10

=== Samford ===
Team	1	2	3	4	OT	Total
#20 Bulldogs (SAM)	7	13	0	14	0	34
• #5 Bulldogs (CIT)	7	7	7	13	3	37

- Date: November 5, 2016
- Location: Johnson Hagood Stadium, Charleston, SC
- Game start: 2:00 PM EST
- Elapsed time: 3:24
- Game attendance: 15,015
- Referee: Edwin Lee
- TV announcers (ESPN3): Kevin Fitzgerald, Sadath Jean-Pierre

Scoring summary
1	4:23	CIT	Cam Jackson 8-yard run (Cody Clark kick)	CIT 7–0
1	1:53	SAM	Devlin Hodges 10-yard run (Reece Everett kick)	7–7
2	10:11	SAM	Hodges 57-yard run (Everett kick)	SAM 14–7
2	8:18	CIT	Tyler Renew 55-yard run (Clark kick)	14–14
2	5:23	SAM	Everett 51-yard field goal	SAM 17–14
2	0:46	SAM	Everett 44-yard field goal	SAM 20–14
3	1:53	CIT	Renew 58-yard run (Clark kick)	CIT 21–20
4	13:02	CIT	Clark 48-yard field goal	CIT 24–20
4	10:36	SAM	Emmanuel Obajimi 18-yard pass from Hodges (Everett kick)	SAM 27–24
4	6:17	SAM	Karel Hamilton 9-yard pass from Hodges (Everett kick)	SAM 34–24
4	4:24	CIT	Renew 4-yard run (Clark kick)	SAM 34–31
4	0:03	CIT	Clark 34-yard field goal	34–34
OT		CIT	Clark 36-yard field goal	CIT 37–34

=== VMI ===
Team	1	2	3	4	Total
• #5 Bulldogs	10	7	6	7	30
Keydets	0	7	13	0	20

- Date: November 12, 2016
- Location: Alumni Memorial Stadium, Lexington, VA
- Game start: 1:30 PM EST
- Elapsed time: 3:07
- Game attendance: 8,251
- Game weather: Low 50's • 3–5 MPH • Cool, clear, not bad
- Referee: Larry Saunders
- TV announcers (ESPN3): Wade Branner, Dave Harding

Scoring summary
1	6:01	CIT	Cody Clark 21-yard field goal	CIT 3–0
1	1:36	CIT	Jonathan King 54-yard fumble recovery (Clark kick)	CIT 10–0
2	14:26	VMI	Austin Coulling 30-yard pass from Ryan Swingle (Tommy Smith kick)	CIT 10–7
2	10:49	CIT	Dominique Allen 7-yard run (Clark kick)	CIT 17–7
3	8:51	CIT	Tyler Renew 8-yard pass from Dominique Allen (Clark kick blocked)	CIT 23–7
3	3:40	VMI	Aaron Sanders 27-yard pass from Jake Paladino (Smith kick)	CIT 23–14
3	1:18	VMI	Tyain Smith 5-yard run (Smith kick blocked)	CIT 23–20
4	13:03	CIT	Jonathan Dorogy 17-yard run (Clark kick)	CIT 30–20

=== North Carolina ===
Team	1	2	3	4	Total
#5 Bulldogs	0	0	0	7	7
• Tar Heels	14	17	10	0	41

- Date: November 19, 2016
- Location: Kenan Memorial Stadium, Chapel Hill, NC
- Game start: 3:30 PM EST
- Elapsed time: 2:55
- Game attendance: 41,000
- Game weather: 68°F • Variable • Mostly sunny
- Referee: Gary Patterson
- TV announcers (ACCN+): Dan Gutowsky, John Gregory

Scoring summary
1	3:10	UNC	Brandon Fritts 19-yard pass from Mitch Trubisky (Nick Weiler kick)	UNC 7–0
1	1:15	UNC	Ryan Switzer 72-yard pass from Trubisky (Weiler kick)	UNC 14–0
2	11:09	UNC	T.J. Logan 23-yard pass from Trubisky (Weiler Kick)	UNC 21–0
2	9:54	UNC	Dominquie Green 58-yard interception return (Weiler kick)	UNC 28–0
2	0:59	UNC	Weiler 23-yard field goal	UNC 31–0
3	14:46	UNC	Logan 100-yard kickoff return (Weiler kick)	UNC 38–0
3	6:29	UNC	Weiler 41-yard field goal	UNC 41–0
4	9:21	CIT	Grant Drakeford 28-yard run (Cody Clark kick)	UNC 41–7

== FCS playoffs ==
=== Second round – Wofford ===
Team	1	2	3	4	Total
• #19 Terriers	0	0	3	14	17
#6 Bulldogs	3	0	0	0	3

- Date: December 3, 2016
- Location: Johnson Hagood Stadium, Charleston, SC
- Game start: 6:00 PM EST
- Elapsed time: 2:51
- Game attendance: 10,336
- Referee: Charlie Jebran
- TV announcers (ESPN3): Greg Mescall, Stan Lewter

Scoring summary
1	7:25	CIT	Cody Clark 24-yard field goal	CIT 3–0
3	8:09	WOF	David Marvin 47-yard field goal	3–3
4	10:28	WOF	Joe Newman 36-yard run (Marvin kick)	WOF 10–3
4	0:30	WOF	Devin Watson 64-yard interception (Marvin kick)	WOF 17–3

== Ranking movements ==
Ranking movements Legend: ██ Increase in ranking ██ Decrease in ranking ( ) = First-place votes
	Week													
Poll	Pre	1	2	3	4	5	6	7	8	9	10	11	12	Final
STATS	15	15	15	10	9	9	8	5 (5)	5 (3)	5 (3)	5 (7)	5 (6)	6	10
Coaches	15	16	15	10	10	9	9	6	7	7	6	6	6	9
FCS Playoffs	Not released									6	6	6	Not released	
