= 2016 Western Carolina Catamounts football team =

American college football season

2016 Western Carolina Catamounts football
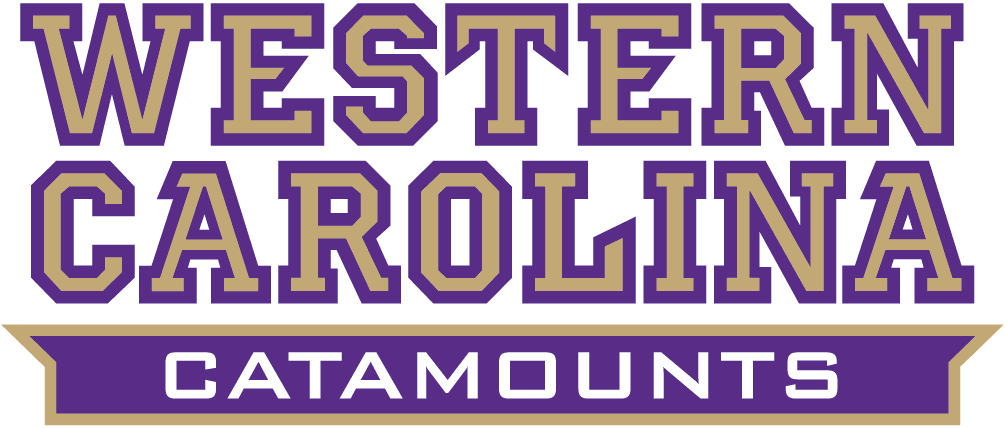
- Conference: Southern Conference
- Record: 2–9 (1–7 SoCon)
- Head coach: Mark Speir (5th season)
- Offensive coordinator: Brad Glenn (5th season)
- Offensive scheme: Spread
- Defensive coordinator: Dustin Landry (1st season)
- Base defense: 4–3
- Home stadium: Bob Waters Field at E. J. Whitmire Stadium

2016 Southern Conference football standings
	Conf.			Overall
Team	W		L	W		L
No. 10 The Citadel $^	8	–	0	10	–	2
No. 9 Wofford ^	6	–	2	10	–	4
No. 13 Chattanooga ^	6	–	2	9	–	4
No. 23 Samford ^	5	–	3	7	–	5
Mercer	4	–	4	6	–	5
Furman	3	–	5	3	–	8
East Tennessee State	2	–	6	5	–	6
Western Carolina	1	–	7	2	–	9
VMI	1	–	7	3	–	8
$ – Conference champion; ^ – FCS playoff participant; Rankings from STATS Poll

The 2016 Western Carolina Catamounts team represented Western Carolina University as a member of the Southern Conference (SoCon) during the 2016 NCAA Division I FCS football season. Led by fifth-year head coach Mark Speir, the Catamounts compiled an overall record of 2–9 with a mark of 1–7 in conference play, tying for eighth place in the SoCon. Western Carolina played home games at Bob Waters Field at E. J. Whitmire Stadium in Cullowhee, North Carolina.

== Schedule ==
Date	Time	Opponent	Site	TV	Result	Attendance
September 3	6:00 pm	at East Carolina*	Dowdy–Ficklen Stadium; Greenville, NC	ESPN3	L 7–52	44,161
September 10	6:00 pm	Gardner–Webb*	Bob Waters Field at E. J. Whitmire Stadium; Cullowhee, NC	SDN	W 44–14	11,598
September 17	1:30 pm	vs. East Tennessee State	Bristol Motor Speedway; Bristol, TN	ESPN3	L 31–34	13,863
October 1	3:30 pm	No. 9 The Citadel	Bob Waters Field at E. J. Whitmire Stadium; Cullowhee, NC	ESPN3	L 14–37	12,283
October 8	7:00 pm	Wofford	Bob Waters Field at E. J. Whitmire Stadium; Cullowhee, NC	ASN	L 19–31	9,457
October 15	4:00 pm	at Mercer	Moye Complex; Macon, GA	ESPN3	L 24–38	12,247
October 22	6:00 pm	at No. 21 Samford	Seibert Stadium; Homewood, AL	ASN	L 17–30	4,031
October 29	3:30 pm	No. 10 Chattanooga^{†}	Bob Waters Field at E. J. Whitmire Stadium; Cullowhee, NC	SDN/WMYA	L 25–38	10,760
November 5	2:00 pm	VMI	Bob Waters Field at E. J. Whitmire Stadium; Cullowhee, NC	ESPN3	W 32–29	8,225
November 12	4:00 pm	at Furman	Paladin Stadium; Greenville, SC	ESPN3/WMYA	L 21–49	4,117
November 19	4:00 pm	at South Carolina*	Williams–Brice Stadium; Columbia, SC	SECN	L 31–44	76,650
*Non-conference game; ^{†}Homecoming; Rankings from STATS Poll released prior to the game; All times are in Eastern time

== Game summaries ==
=== @ East Carolina Pirates ===
Western Carolina @ East Carolina

Team	1	2	3	4	Total
Catamounts	0	7	0	0	7
• Pirates	10	21	21	0	52

- Date: September 3
- Location: Dowdy–Ficklen Stadium
  Greenville, NC
- Game start: 6:00 PM EDT
- Elapsed time: 2:59
- Game attendance: 44,161
- Game weather: 73°F • NNW 12 • Overcast with light rain
- Referee: Todd LaPenta
- Television network: ESPN3

=== Gardner–Webb ===
Gardner–Webb @ Western Carolina

Team	1	2	3	4	Total
Runnin' Bulldogs	7	7	0	0	14
• Catamounts	14	3	13	14	44

- Date: September 10
- Location: E. J. Whitmire Stadium
  Cullowhee, NC
- Game start: 6:00 pm EDT
- Elapsed time: 3:30
- Game attendance: 11,598
- Game weather: Low 80s • WSW 5 • Mostly sunny
- Referee: Edwin Lee
- Television network: SDN

=== Vs. East Tennessee State ===
Western Carolina vs. East Tennessee State

Team	1	2	3	4	Total
Catamounts	7	14	0	10	31
• Buccaneers	0	10	14	10	34

- Date: September 17
- Location: Bristol Motor Speedway
  Bristol, TN
- Game start: 1:30 PM EDT
- Elapsed time: 3:31
- Game attendance: 13,863
- Game weather: 80°F • S 6 • Fair
- Referee: Thomas Graham
- Television network: ESPN3

=== The Citadel ===
The Citadel @ Western Carolina

Team	1	2	3	4	Total
• #9 Bulldogs	7	20	7	3	37
Catamounts	0	0	7	7	14

- Date: October 1
- Location: E. J. Whitmire Stadium
  Cullowhee, NC
- Game start: 3:30 PM EDT
- Elapsed time: 3:11
- Game attendance: 12,283
- Game weather: Low 70s • W 4 • Sunny
- Referee: Larry Saunders
- Television network: ESPN3

=== Wofford ===
Wofford @ Western Carolina

Team	1	2	3	4	Total
• Terriers	3	14	7	7	31
Catamounts	9	0	7	3	19

- Date: October 8
- Location: E. J. Whitmire Stadium
  Cullowhee, NC
- Game start: 7:00 pm EDT
- Elapsed time: 3:01
- Game attendance: 9,457
- Game weather: Low 60s • NNW 12 • Partly cloudy, windy
- Referee: Edwin Lee
- Television network: ASN

=== @ Mercer ===
Western Carolina @ Mercer

Team	1	2	3	4	Total
Catamounts	0	7	14	3	24
• Bears	0	3	21	14	38

- Date: October 15
- Location: Moye Complex
  Macon, GA
- Game start: 4:00 PM EDT
- Elapsed time: 3:33
- Game attendance: 12,247
- Game weather: 75°F • E 6 • Cloudy
- Referee: Marshall Lewis
- Television network: ESPN3

=== @ Samford ===
Western Carolina @ Samford

Team	1	2	3	4	Total
Catamounts	7	0	3	7	17
• #21 Bulldogs	7	6	14	3	30

- Date: October 22
- Location: Seibert Stadium
  Homewood, AL
- Game start: 7:00 PM EDT
- Elapsed time: 3:25
- Game attendance: 4,031
- Game weather: 65°F • NNW 8 • Sunny and clear
- Referee: Larry Saunders
- Television network: ASN

=== Chattanooga ===
Chattanooga @ Western Carolina

Team	1	2	3	4	Total
• #10 Mocs	14	17	7	0	38
Catamounts	10	0	7	8	25

- Date: October 29
- Location: E. J. Whitmire Stadium
  Cullowhee, NC
- Game start: 3:30 PM EDT
- Elapsed time: 2:51
- Game attendance: 10,760
- Game weather: 75°F • 4–6 mph • Mostly sunny and mild
- Referee: Larry Adcock
- Television network: SDN/WMYA

=== VMI ===
VMI @ Western Carolina

Team	1	2	3	4	Total
Keydets	0	9	6	14	29
• Catamounts	7	14	3	8	32

- Date: November 5
- Location: E. J. Whitmire Stadium
  Cullowhee, NC
- Game start: 2:00 PM EDT
- Elapsed time: 3:17
- Game attendance: 8,225
- Game weather: High 60s • NW 3 • Sunny
- Referee: Thomas Graham
- Television network: ESPN3

=== @ Furman ===
Western Carolina @ Furman

Team	1	2	3	4	Total
Catamounts	14	0	7	0	21
• Paladins	7	6	22	14	49

- Date: November 12
- Location: Paladin Stadium
  Greenville, SC
- Game start: 4:00 PM EST
- Elapsed time: 2:47
- Game attendance: 4,117
- Game weather: 59°F • Light wind • Clear
- Referee: Bob Johnson
- Television network: ESPN3/WYMA

=== @ South Carolina ===
Western Carolina @ South Carolina

Team	1	2	3	4	Total
Catamounts	14	3	8	6	31
• Gamecocks	21	14	3	6	44

- Date: November 19
- Location: Williams-Brice Stadium
  Columbia, SC
- Game start: 4:00 PM EST
- Elapsed time: 3:12
- Game attendance: 76,650
- Game weather: 70°F • NW 16 • Sunny
- Referee: Matt Loeffler
- Television network: SECN
