= 2016 VMI Keydets football team =

American college football season

2016 VMI Keydets football
- Conference: Southern Conference
- Record: 3–8 (1–7 SoCon)
- Head coach: Scott Wachenheim (2nd season)
- Offensive coordinator: Dustin Ward (2nd season)
- Offensive scheme: Pro-style
- Defensive coordinator: Tom Clark (2nd season)
- Base defense: 3–4
- Home stadium: Alumni Memorial Field

2016 Southern Conference football standings
	Conf.			Overall
Team	W		L	W		L
No. 10 The Citadel $^	8	–	0	10	–	2
No. 9 Wofford ^	6	–	2	10	–	4
No. 13 Chattanooga ^	6	–	2	9	–	4
No. 23 Samford ^	5	–	3	7	–	5
Mercer	4	–	4	6	–	5
Furman	3	–	5	3	–	8
East Tennessee State	2	–	6	5	–	6
Western Carolina	1	–	7	2	–	9
VMI	1	–	7	3	–	8
$ – Conference champion; ^ – FCS playoff participant; Rankings from STATS Poll

The 2016 VMI Keydets football team represented the Virginia Military Institute in the 2016 NCAA Division I FCS football season. It was VMI's 126th football season and the Keydets were led by second year head coach Scott Wachenheim. They played their home games at 10,000–seat Alumni Memorial Field at Foster Stadium, as they have since 1962. This was VMI's third season as a member of the Southern Conference, after playing for 11 seasons in the Big South Conference. VMI was also a charter member of the Southern Conference, from 1921 through 2003. They finished the season 3–8, 1–7 in SoCon play to finish in a tie for eighth place.

== Schedule ==
Date	Time	Opponent	Site	TV	Result	Attendance
September 3	6:30 pm	at Akron*	InfoCision Stadium; Akron, OH	ESPN3	L 24–47	11,061
September 10	6:00 pm	at Morehead State*	Jayne Stadium; Morehead, KY	OVCDN	W 17–13	5,588
September 24	3:00 pm	at Bucknell*	Christy Mathewson–Memorial Stadium; Lewisburg, PA	CI	W 23–17 ^{3OT}	4,972
October 1	1:30 pm	Mercer	Alumni Memorial Field; Lexington, VA	ESPN3	L 30–33 ^{OT}	5,266
October 8	1:30 pm	East Tennessee State	Alumni Memorial Field; Lexington, VA	ESPN3	W 37–7	5,638
October 15	3:00 pm	at No. 24 Samford	Seibert Stadium; Homewood, AL	ESPN3	L 21–55	4,085
October 22	2:00 pm	at No. 11 Chattanooga	Finley Stadium; Chattanooga, TN	SDN	L 13–30	10,505
October 29	1:30 pm	Furman	Alumni Memorial Field; Lexington, VA	ESPN3	L 10–24	5,610
November 5	2:00 pm	at Western Carolina	E. J. Whitmire Stadium; Cullowhee, NC	ESPN3	L 29–32	8,225
November 12	1:30 pm	No. 5 The Citadel	Alumni Memorial Field; Lexington, VA (Military Classic of the South)	ESPN3	L 20–30	8,251
November 19	1:30 pm	at No. 20 Wofford	Gibbs Stadium; Spartanburg, SC	ESPN3	L 0–17	8,102
*Non-conference game; Rankings from STATS Poll released prior to the game; All times are in Eastern time

- Source: Schedule

== Game summaries ==
=== At Akron ===
	1	2	3	4	Total
Keydets	7	3	14	0	24
Zips	12	7	7	21	47

=== At Morehead State ===
	1	2	3	4	Total
Keydets	0	14	3	0	17
Eagles	0	7	0	6	13

=== At Bucknell ===
	1	2	3	4	OT	2OT	3OT	Total
Keydets	6	0	8	3	0	0	6	23
Bison	0	7	7	3	0	0	0	17

=== Mercer ===
	1	2	3	4	OT	Total
Bears	14	7	0	6	6	33
Keydets	0	7	7	13	3	30

=== East Tennessee State ===
	1	2	3	4	Total
Buccaneers	0	0	0	7	7
Keydets	14	13	3	7	37

=== At Samford ===
	1	2	3	4	Total
Keydets	7	7	7	0	21
#24 Bulldogs	28	10	0	17	55

=== At Chattanooga ===
	1	2	3	4	Total
Keydets	0	0	13	0	13
#11 Mocs	7	10	6	7	30

=== Furman ===
	1	2	3	4	Total
Paladins	7	10	7	0	24
Keydets	3	0	0	7	10

=== At Western Carolina ===
	1	2	3	4	Total
Keydets	0	9	6	14	29
Catamounts	7	14	3	8	32

=== The Citadel ===
	1	2	3	4	Total
#5 Bulldogs	10	7	6	7	30
Keydets	0	7	13	0	20

=== At Wofford ===
	1	2	3	4	Total
Keydets	0	0	0	0	0
#20 Terriers	3	0	0	14	17
