= 2016 Mercer Bears football team =

American college football season

2016 Mercer Bears football
- Conference: Southern Conference
- Record: 6–5 (4–4 SoCon)
- Head coach: Bobby Lamb (4th season)
- Offensive coordinator: Casey Vogt (4th season)
- Defensive coordinator: Mike Kolakowski (4th season)
- Home stadium: Moye Complex

2016 Southern Conference football standings
	Conf.			Overall
Team	W		L	W		L
No. 10 The Citadel $^	8	–	0	10	–	2
No. 9 Wofford ^	6	–	2	10	–	4
No. 13 Chattanooga ^	6	–	2	9	–	4
No. 23 Samford ^	5	–	3	7	–	5
Mercer	4	–	4	6	–	5
Furman	3	–	5	3	–	8
East Tennessee State	2	–	6	5	–	6
Western Carolina	1	–	7	2	–	9
VMI	1	–	7	3	–	8
$ – Conference champion; ^ – FCS playoff participant; Rankings from STATS Poll

The 2016 Mercer Bears football team represented Mercer University as a member the Southern Conference (SoCon) during the 2016 NCAA Division I FCS football season. They were led by fourth-year head coach Bobby Lamb and played their home games at the Moye Complex in Macon, Georgia. Mercer finished the season 6–5 overall and 4–4 in SoCon play to place fifth.

== Schedule ==
Date	Time	Opponent	Site	TV	Result	Attendance
September 1	7:00 pm	No. 15 The Citadel	Five Star Stadium; Macon, GA	FSN	L 23–24	12,542
September 10	3:00 pm	at Georgia Tech*	Bobby Dodd Stadium; Atlanta, GA	ACCN+	L 10–35	49,992
September 17	4:00 pm	Tennessee Tech*	Five Star Stadium; Macon, GA	ESPN3	W 34–27	9,772
October 1	1:30 pm	at VMI	Alumni Memorial Field; Lexington, VA	ESPN3	W 33–30 ^{OT}	5,266
October 8	4:00 pm	at No. 5 Chattanooga	Finley Stadium; Chattanooga, TN	SDN	L 31–52	11,039
October 15	4:00 pm	Western Carolina	Five Star Stadium; Macon, GA	ESPN3	W 38–24	12,247
October 22	4:00 pm	at Austin Peay*	Fortera Stadium; Clarksville, TN	OVCDN	W 41–34	6,506
October 29	1:30 pm	at Wofford	Gibbs Stadium; Spartanburg, SC	ESPN3	L 21–31	6,190
November 5	3:00 pm	East Tennessee State^{†}	Five Star Stadium; Macon, GA	FSN	W 21–13	10,913
November 12	3:30 pm	at No. 22 Samford	Seibert Stadium; Homewood, AL	ESPN3	L 19–24	8,379
November 19	3:00 pm	Furman	Five Star Stadium; Macon, GA	FSN	W 27–24	10,712
*Non-conference game; ^{†}Homecoming; Rankings from STATS Poll released prior to the game; All times are in Eastern time
