= 2016 Wofford Terriers football team =

American college football season

2016 Wofford Terriers football

FCS Playoffs Quarterfinals, L 23–30 ^{2OT} vs. Youngstown State
- Conference: Southern Conference

Ranking
- STATS: No. 9
- FCS Coaches: No. 11
- Record: 10–4 (6–2 SoCon)
- Head coach: Mike Ayers (29th season)
- Offensive coordinator: Wade Lang (29th season)
- Defensive coordinator: Nathan Fuqua (12th season)
- Home stadium: Gibbs Stadium

2016 Southern Conference football standings
| | Conf. | | | Overall |
| Team | W | | L | W | | L |
|---|---|---|---|---|---|---|
| No. 10 The Citadel $^ | 8 | – | 0 | 10 | – | 2 |
| No. 9 Wofford ^ | 6 | – | 2 | 10 | – | 4 |
| No. 13 Chattanooga ^ | 6 | – | 2 | 9 | – | 4 |
| No. 23 Samford ^ | 5 | – | 3 | 7 | – | 5 |
| Mercer | 4 | – | 4 | 6 | – | 5 |
| Furman | 3 | – | 5 | 3 | – | 8 |
| East Tennessee State | 2 | – | 6 | 5 | – | 6 |
| Western Carolina | 1 | – | 7 | 2 | – | 9 |
| VMI | 1 | – | 7 | 3 | – | 8 |
$ – Conference champion; ^ – FCS playoff participant; Rankings from STATS Poll

The 2016 Wofford Terriers football team represented Wofford College in the 2016 NCAA Division I FCS football season. They were led by 29th-year head coach Mike Ayers and played their home games at Gibbs Stadium. They were a member of the Southern Conference. They finished the season 10–4, 6–2 in SoCon play to finish in a tie for second place. They received an at-large bid to the FCS playoffs where they defeated Charleston Southern and The Citadel in the first and second round, before losing to Youngstown State in the quarterfinals.

== Schedule ==
| Date | Time | Opponent | Rank | Site | TV | Result | Attendance |
|---|---|---|---|---|---|---|---|
| September 1 | 7:00 pm | at Tennessee Tech* | | Tucker Stadium; Cookeville, TN | OVCDN | W 21–7 | 9,066 |
| September 10 | 4:00 pm | at No. 19 (FBS) Ole Miss* | | Vaught–Hemingway Stadium; Oxford, MS | SECN | L 13–38 | 64,232 |
| September 17 | 3:00 pm | Johnson C. Smith* | | Gibbs Stadium; Spartanburg, SC | ESPN3 | W 59–0 | 5,417 |
| September 24 | 1:30 pm | East Tennessee State | | Gibbs Stadium; Spartanburg, SC | ESPN3 | W 31–0 | 7,316 |
| October 1 | 3:00 pm | at Samford | | Seibert Stadium; Homewood, AL | ESPN3 | L 26–28 | 8,509 |
| October 8 | 7:00 pm | at Western Carolina | | E. J. Whitmire Stadium; Cullowhee, NC | ASN | W 31–14 | 9,457 |
| October 22 | 1:30 pm | No. 5 The Citadel^{†} | | Gibbs Stadium; Spartanburg, SC | ESPN3 | L 21–24 ^{OT} | 11,102 |
| October 29 | 1:30 pm | Mercer | | Gibbs Stadium; Spartanburg, SC | ESPN3 | W 31–21 | 6,190 |
| November 5 | 1:30 pm | at Furman | | Paladin Stadium; Greenville, SC | ESPN3 | W 34–27 | 7,834 |
| November 12 | 2:00 pm | at No. 7 Chattanooga | | Finley Stadium; Chattanooga, TN | SDN | W 36–28 | 8,750 |
| November 19 | 1:30 pm | VMI | No. 20 | Gibbs Stadium; Spartanburg, SC | ESPN3 | W 17–0 | 8,102 |
| November 26 | 1:00 pm | No. 10 Charleston Southern* | No. 19 | Gibbs Stadium; Spartanburg, SC (NCAA Division I First Round) | ESPN3 | W 15–14 | 2,605 |
| December 3 | 6:00 pm | at No. 6 The Citadel* | No. 19 | Johnson Hagood Stadium; Charleston, SC (NCAA Division I Second Round) | ESPN3 | W 17–3 | 10,336 |
| December 10 | 2:00 pm | at No. 13 Youngstown State* | No. 19 | Stambaugh Stadium; Youngstown, OH (NCAA Division I Quarterfinal) | ESPN3 | L 23–30 ^{2OT} | 8,066 |
*Non-conference game; ^{†}Homecoming; Rankings from STATS Poll released prior to the game; All times are in Eastern time

== Ranking movements ==
Ranking movements Legend: ██ Increase in ranking ██ Decrease in ranking RV = Received votes
| | Week | | | | | | | | | | | | | |
| Poll | Pre | 1 | 2 | 3 | 4 | 5 | 6 | 7 | 8 | 9 | 10 | 11 | 12 | Final |
|---|---|---|---|---|---|---|---|---|---|---|---|---|---|---|
| STATS FCS | RV | RV | RV | RV | RV | RV | RV | RV | RV | RV | RV | 20 | 19 | 9 |
| Coaches | RV | RV | RV | RV | RV | RV | RV | RV | RV | RV | RV | 19 | 19 | 11 |
