= Greg Mescall =

American sports broadcaster (born 1981)

Greg Mescall (born December 20, 1981) is a sports broadcaster and host covering a variety of sports for different networks. 2018 marked Mescall's second Olympic Games for Westwood One Sports/NBC Radio where he covered freestyle ski and snowboard including Shaun White's return to the podium. Currently calling Manhattan College men's basketball, Mescall has also worked for ESPN, Pac-12 Network, Olympic Channel, Big Ten Network, ESPNU, Fox Sports West, Fox Sports and USA Water Polo, and has done play-by-play for the Metro Atlantic Athletic Conference, IVY League on ESPN+ and Monmouth University's ESPN digital broadcasts.

== Personal ==
A native of Leonardo, New Jersey, Mescall earned his B.A. in communication, Radio and Television from Monmouth University, and an M.S. in education from Wagner College.
