= Bruce Fowler (American football) =

American football coach

Current position
- Title: Head coach/Athletic director
- Team: Lakeway Christian Academy (TN)

Playing career
- 1977–1980: Furman
- Position: Defensive back

Coaching career (HC unless noted)
- 1981–1983: Wren HS (SC) (assistant)
- 1984–2001: Furman (assistant)
- 2002–2010: Vanderbilt (DC)
- 2011–2016: Furman
- 2018–2018: Lakeway Christian Academy (TN)

Administrative career (AD unless noted)
- 2018–2018: Lakeway Christian Academy (TN)

Head coaching record
- Overall: 27–43 (college)

Bruce Fowler is an American football coach and athletics administrator. He was the head football coach and athletic director at Lakeway Christian Academy in Morristown, Tennessee. Fowler was the head football coach at Furman University in Greenville, South Carolina from 2011 to 2016, compiling a record of 27–43. He was named the head coach of the Furman Paladins football program in December 2010 and resigned on December 2, 2016.

== Head coaching record ==
=== College ===
Year	Team	Overall	Conference	Standing	Bowl/playoffs
Furman Paladins (Southern Conference) (2011–2016)
2011	Furman	6–5	5–3	4th	
2012	Furman	3–8	2–6	7th	
2013	Furman	8–6	6–2	T–1st	L NCAA Division I Second Round
2014	Furman	3–9	2–5	6th	
2015	Furman	4–7	2–5	T–6th	
2016	Furman	3–8	3–5	6th	
Furman:		27–43	20–26		
Total:		27–43			
National championship Conference title Conference division title or championship game berth
