= Moye Complex =

Sports complex in Macon, Georgia, United States

Coordinates: 32.8267°N 83.6551°W

- Interactive map of Moye Complex
- Full name: Tony and Nancy Moye Football and Lacrosse Complex (complex) Five Star Stadium (stadium)
- Location: 1501 Mercer University Dr; Macon, GA 31207
- Owner: Mercer University
- Operator: Mercer University
- Capacity: 10,200
- Surface: AstroTurf 3D Extreme
- Record attendance: 12,542 (September 1, 2016 vs. The Citadel

Construction
- Groundbreaking: November 12, 2011
- Opened: August 31, 2013
- Cost: $14 million
- Architect: McMillan-Pazdan-Smith
- General contractors: Chris R. Sheridan & Co.

Tenants
- Mercer Bears football team Mercer Bears men's lacrosse team

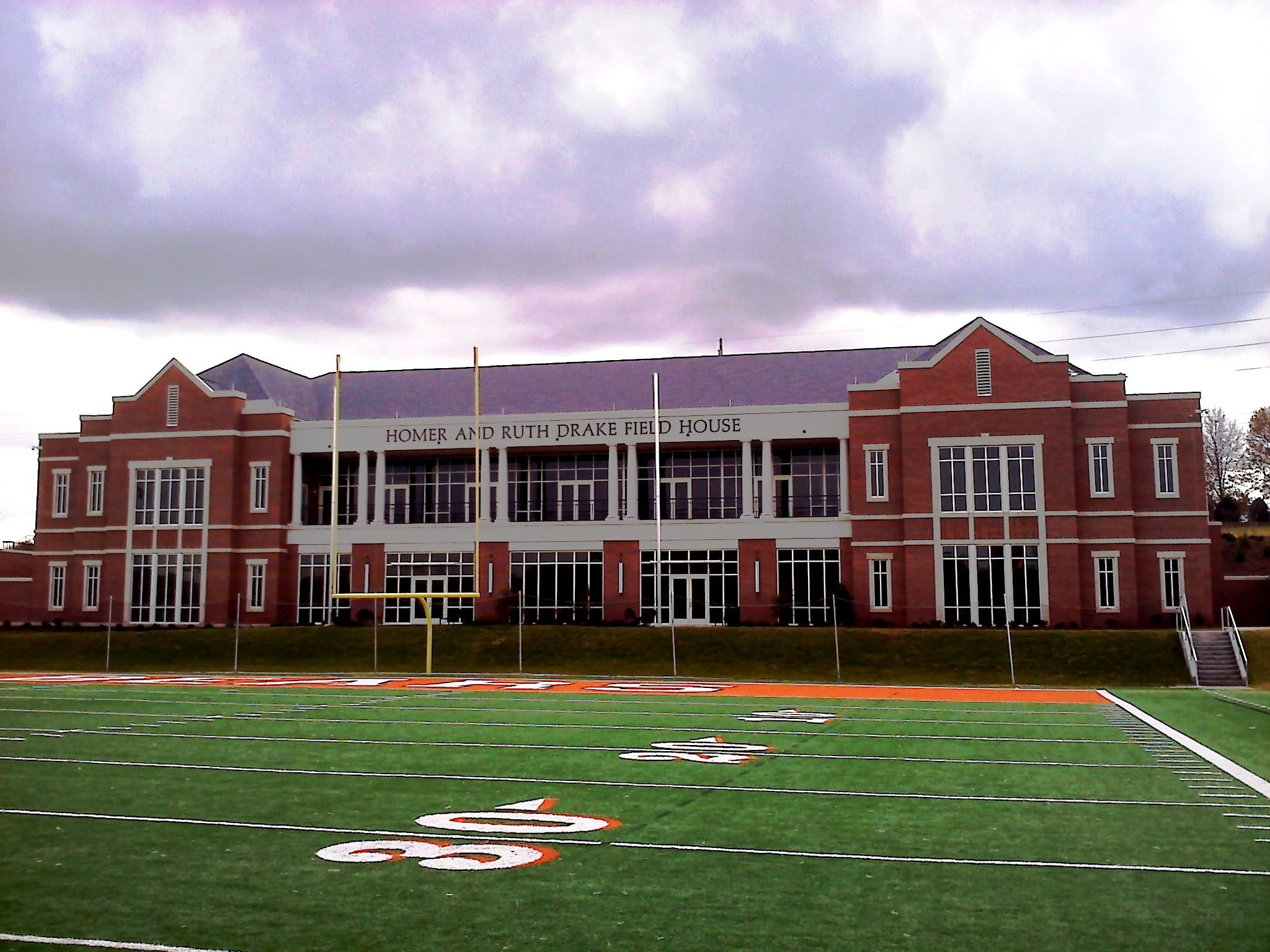
Homer and Ruth Drake Field House

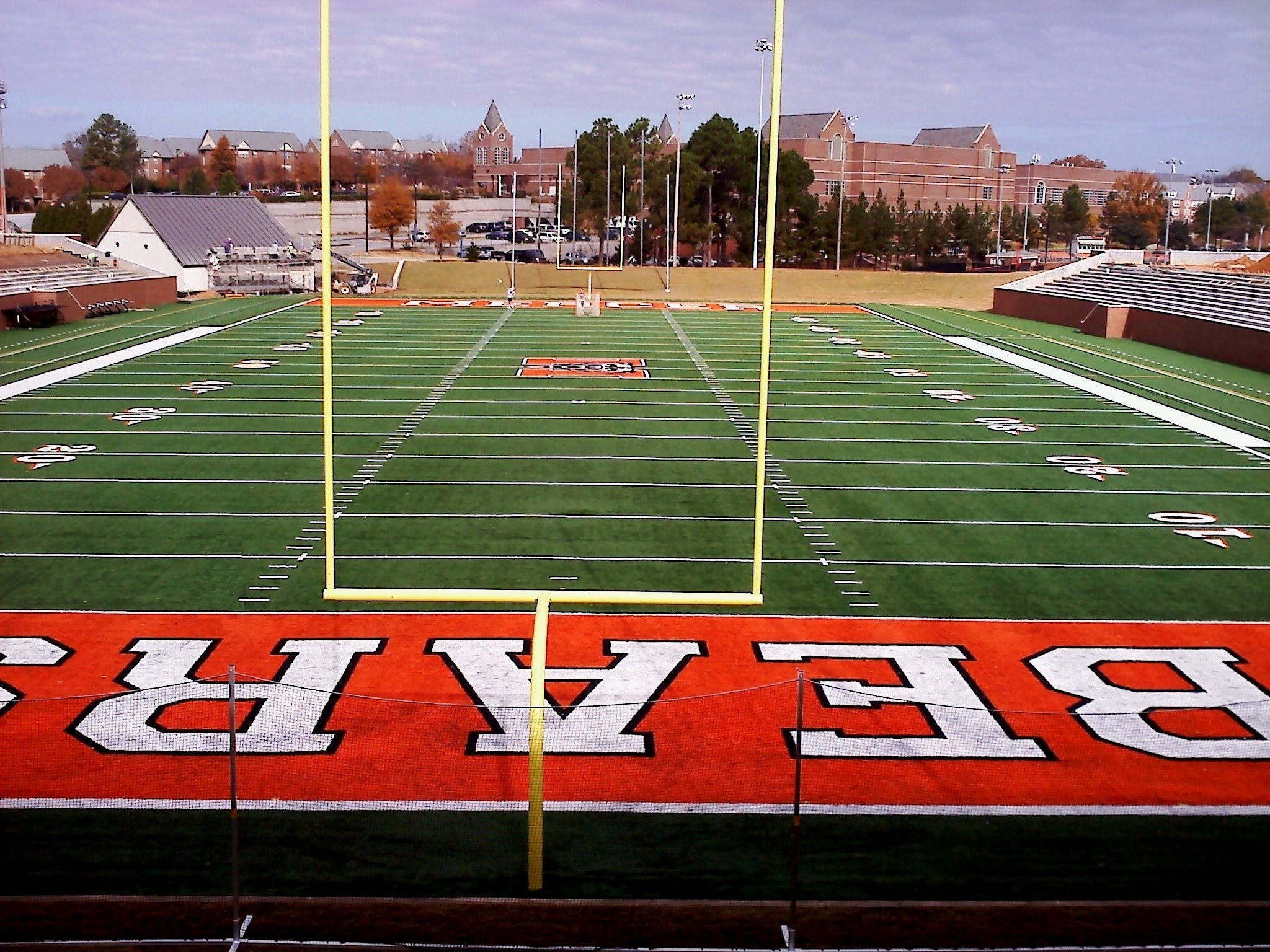
Moye Complex (under construction, view from the Homer and Ruth Drake Field House)

The Tony and Nancy Moye Football and Lacrosse Complex (also known as Moye Complex, the stadium itself is officially named Five Star Stadium) is a 10,200 seat football and lacrosse stadium on the campus of Mercer University in Macon, Georgia, United States. Construction began on November 12, 2011 and was completed in 2013; the AstroTurf 3D Extreme surface was completed in 2012, the football team conducted its first practice in the stadium on August 27, 2012. The university initially announced the complex would have 6,000 seats; the number was increased to 10,200 in 2012. The first football game at Moye Complex was on August 31, 2013; Mercer defeated Reinhardt University in front of an overflow crowd of 12,172 spectators.

The sports complex has the following components: the Homer and Ruth Drake Field House, the William H. Anderson II Family Field, the Marshall and Jane Butler Family Plaza, and the Tony and Nancy Moye Family Football and Lacrosse Complex. Messrs. Drake, Anderson, Butler, and Moye are university trustees and were major donors towards the stadium.

On February 26, 2015, the stadium portion of the complex was named Five Star Stadium in recognition of a multimillion-dollar financial commitment to Mercer athletics by Five Star Automotive Group, which owns dealerships in Georgia, Tennessee and South Carolina. The president of Five Star Automotive Group, Charlie Cantrell, is also president of the Mercer Athletic Foundation.

The complex is located adjacent to Mercer's other athletic facilities including Hawkins Arena (basketball and athletic department offices), Claude Smith Field (baseball), and Sikes Field (softball). There is a 101-room Hilton Garden Inn on university-owned land adjacent to the complex. Parking lots are available for visitors-spectators arriving via the Mercer University Drive exit off of Interstate 75.

Mercer has an NCAA Division I athletic program and fields teams in eight men's and ten women's sports; all university-sponsored sports compete in the Southern Conference except women's lacrosse and women's sand volleyball, which are not sponsored by the SoCon, and thus compete in the ASUN Conference.

== See also ==
- Mercer Bears
- Claude Smith Field
- University Center
- List of NCAA Division I FCS football stadiums
