= Kermit Tipton Stadium =

Multi-use stadium in Johnson City, Tennessee

Steve Spurrier Field at
- Kermit Tipton Stadium
- Interactive map of Steve Spurrier Field at
- Location: 1509 John Exum Pkwy. Johnson City, Tennessee
- Coordinates: 36°19′32″N 82°22′10″W
- Owner: Johnson City Schools
- Capacity: 6,600
- Surface: Artificial turf

Construction
- Opened: 2010

Tenants
- Science Hill Hilltoppers (TSSAA) (2010–present); ETSU Buccaneers (NCAA D-I) (2015–2016); Tri-Cities Otters (USL2) (2016–present)

Steve Spurrier Field at Kermit Tipton Stadium is a 6,600-capacity multi-use stadium on the campus of Science Hill High School in Johnson City, Tennessee. In addition to serving as home to the Hilltoppers, the stadium played host to the East Tennessee State Buccaneers football team while their own facility was being built.

Kermit Tipton Stadium was built to replace the aging Memorial Stadium located near Howard Johnson Field.

The stadium was named for Kermit Tipton, a former head football coach at Science Hill High School, and later principal of Johnson City Junior High and Independence Hall Junior High.
