= 2011 Rhode Island Rams football team =

American college football season

2011 Rhode Island Rams football
- Conference: Colonial Athletic Association
- Record: 3–8 (2–6 CAA)
- Head coach: Joe Trainer (3rd season)
- Offensive coordinator: Roy Istvan (1st season)
- Defensive coordinator: Ryan Crawford (1st season)
- Home stadium: Meade Stadium

2011 Colonial Athletic Association football standings
| | Conf. | | | Overall |
| Team | W | | L | W | | L |
|---|---|---|---|---|---|---|
| No. 9 Towson $^ | 7 | – | 1 | 9 | – | 3 |
| No. 10 Old Dominion ^ | 6 | – | 2 | 10 | – | 3 |
| No. 8 Maine ^ | 6 | – | 2 | 9 | – | 4 |
| No. 11 New Hampshire ^ | 6 | – | 2 | 8 | – | 4 |
| No. 17 Delaware | 5 | – | 3 | 7 | – | 4 |
| No. 15 James Madison ^ | 5 | – | 3 | 8 | – | 5 |
| William & Mary | 3 | – | 5 | 5 | – | 6 |
| Rhode Island | 2 | – | 6 | 3 | – | 8 |
| Villanova | 1 | – | 7 | 2 | – | 9 |
| Richmond | 0 | – | 8 | 3 | – | 8 |
| UMass * | 0 | – | 0 | 5 | – | 6 |
$ – Conference champion; ^ – FCS playoff participant; * – UMass' conference record was 0–0 because they were transitioning to FBS.; Rankings from The Sports Network poll

The 2011 Rhode Island Rams football team represented the University of Rhode Island in the 2011 NCAA Division I FCS football season. The Rams were led by third year head coach Joe Trainer and played their home games at Meade Stadium. They are a member of the Colonial Athletic Association. They finished the season 3–8, 2–6 in CAA play to finish in eighth place.

== Schedule ==
| Date | Time | Opponent | Site | Result | Attendance |
|---|---|---|---|---|---|
| September 10 | 4:30 pm | at Syracuse* | Carrier Dome; Syracuse, NY | L 14–21 | 36,421 |
| September 17 | 6:30 pm | at No. 21 UMass | Warren McGuirk Alumni Stadium; Hadley, MA | L 27–36 | 11,167 |
| September 24 | 1:00 pm | Fordham* | Meade Stadium; Kingston, RI | W 21–17 | 3,428 |
| October 1 | 6:00 pm | at Brown* | Brown Stadium; Providence, RI (Battle for the Governor's Cup) | L 21–35 | 8,534 |
| October 8 | 1:00 pm | Old Dominion | Meade Stadium; Kingston, RI | L 23–31 | 4,026 |
| October 15 | 1:00 pm | at No. 12 Maine | Alfond Stadium; Orono, ME | L 21–27 | 7,256 |
| October 22 | 12:30 pm | No. 16 Delaware | Meade Stadium; Kingston, RI | W 38–34 | 6,222 |
| October 29 | 12:00 pm | at No. 10 New Hampshire | Cowell Stadium; Durham, NH | L 24–31 | 10,554 |
| November 5 | 1:00 pm | No. 19 William & Mary | Meade Stadium; Kingston, RI | W 24–21 | 7,014 |
| November 12 | 3:00 pm | at No. 20 James Madison | Bridgeforth Stadium; Harrisonburg, VA | L 13–31 | 25,096 |
| November 19 | 12:30 pm | No. 8 Towson | Meade Stadium; Kingston, RI | L 17–28 | 2,883 |
*Non-conference game; Rankings from The Sports Network Poll released prior to the game; All times are in Eastern time
