= Kirk Ciarrocca =

American football coach (born 1965)

Current position
- Title: Offensive coordinator
- Team: Rutgers
- Conference: Big Ten

Biographical details
- Born: August 12, 1965 (age 61)
- Education: Temple University

Coaching career (HC unless noted)
- 1990–1991: Temple (GA)
- 1992: Western Connecticut (PGC/WR)
- 1993: Delaware Valley (PGC/WR)
- 1994–1995: Western Connecticut (OC/QB/WR)
- 1996–1999: Princeton (WR)
- 2000–2001: Penn (WR)
- 2002–2007: Delaware (OC/QB)
- 2008–2010: Rutgers (co-OC/QB)
- 2011: Richmond (QB)
- 2012: Delaware (RB)
- 2013–2016: Western Michigan (OC/QB)
- 2017–2019: Minnesota (OC/QB)
- 2020: Penn State (OC/QB)
- 2021: West Virginia (OA)
- 2022: Minnesota (OC/QB)
- 2023–present: Rutgers (OC/QB)

Kirk Ciarrocca (born August 12, 1965) is an American college football coach. He is the offensive coordinator at Rutgers University. He has previously served as the offensive coordinator at the University of Minnesota and Penn State University.

== Early life ==
Ciarrocca, a native of York County, graduated from Red Land High School in Lewisberry, Pennsylvania. After high school he attended Juniata College, where he played defensive back for the Eagles football team before a knee injury ended his career. He continued his education at Temple University, where he earned both a bachelor's and master's degree in education.

== Coaching career ==
Ciarrocca began his coaching career in 1990 as an offensive graduate assistant at his alma mater Temple. He spent the 1992 and 1993 seasons as the passing game coordinator and wide receivers coach at Western Connecticut State and Delaware Valley respectively. He returned to Western Connecticut State as the offensive coordinator for the 1994 and 1995 seasons before spending six seasons in the Ivy League.

From 1996 to 1999 Ciarrocca served as the wide receiver coach and junior varsity head coach for the Princeton Tigers. The next two seasons Ciarrocca served as the wide receivers coach at the University of Pennsylvania.

=== Delaware ===
Ciarrocca spent six seasons as the offensive coordinator and quarterbacks coach for the Delaware Fightin' Blue Hens and head coach K. C. Keeler from 2002 to 2007. During his time at Delaware, the Blue Hens posted a record of 52–26, winning the 2003 Division I-AA National Championship. Ciarrocca mentored Joe Flacco who was a first round selection in the 2008 NFL draft. Flacco led the Blue Hens to an 11–4 record and the FCS title game.

=== Rutgers ===
In 2008, Ciarrocca was hired by the Rutgers University and head coach Greg Schiano as the Scarlet Knights wide receivers coach. During his time as wide receivers coach, Ciarrocca tutored Kenny Britt who was selected in the first round of the 2009 NFL draft and Tiquan Underwood who was selected in the seventh round of that same draft. Following the 2008 season, Ciarrocca was promoted to quarterbacks coach and co-offensive coordinator for the Scarlet Knights, a title he would share with offensive line coach Kyle Flood. This is a title that Ciarrocca would hold for two season before being fired. In 2010, the Scarlet Knights' offense ranked 114th out of 120 teams, and finished with a 4–8 record.

=== Richmond and Delaware ===
Ciarrocca spent the 2011 season coaching quarterbacks for the Richmond Spiders and interim head coach Wayne Lineburg before rejoined the Delaware staff and head coach K.C. Keeler as the teams running backs coach in 2012.

=== Western Michigan ===
In 2013, Ciarrocca joined the staff of the Western Michigan Broncos and head coach P. J. Fleck as the team's offensive coordinator and quarterbacks coach. Fleck and Ciarrocca were on the same staff at Rutgers during the 2010 season. In 2015, Ciarrocca's offense featured a duo of receivers in Daniel Braverman and Corey Davis who each finished the season with more than 1,300 receiving yards.

=== Minnesota ===
In 2017, it was announced that Ciarrocca would be following head coach P.J. Fleck to Minnesota to be the team's offensive coordinator and quarterbacks coach.

=== Penn State ===
On December 26, 2019, it was announced that Ciarrocca was hired by the Penn State Nittany Lions and head coach James Franklin as the offensive coordinator and quarterback coach, a position left vacant by Ricky Rahne. After one season, Ciarrocca was fired and replaced by Mike Yurcich.

=== Minnesota ===
On December 6, 2021, it was announced that Ciarrocca would return to Minnesota to be the team's offensive coordinator and quarterbacks coach.

=== Rutgers (second stint) ===
On January 7, 2023, Ciarrocca officially returned to Rutgers to be the team's offensive coordinator and quarterbacks coach.
