= Kevin Morris (American football) =

American football player and coach

Biographical details
- Born: c. 1964 (age 61–62)

Playing career
- 1982–1985: Williams
- Position: Quarterback

Coaching career (HC unless noted)
- 1986–1987: Albany (QB/RB)
- 1988–1989: WPI (QB/WR)
- 1990: WPI (DC)
- 1991: Union (NY) (DB)
- 1992: Union (NY) (DC)
- 1993–1998: WPI
- 1999: Stony Brook (OC)
- 2000–2003: Northeastern (OC/QB)
- 2004–2008: UMass (OC/QB)
- 2009–2011: UMass
- 2012–2013: Yale (OC)
- 2014–2018: Monmouth (OC/QB)
- 2019–2021: Penn (OC/QB)

Head coaching record
- Overall: 40–49

Accomplishments and honors

Championships
- 1 FFC (1993)

Kevin Morris (born c. 1962) is an American football coach and former player. He was most recently the offensive coordinator at the University of Pennsylvania. He was formerly the head football coach at the University of Massachusetts Amherst, a position he held from 2009 through November 21, 2011. Morris served as the head football coach at Worcester Polytechnic Institute from 1993 to 1998.

== Head coaching record ==
Year	Team	Overall	Conference	Standing	Bowl/playoffs
WPI Engineers (Freedom Football Conference) (1993–1998)
1993	WPI	5–4	5–0	1st	
1994	WPI	5–4	3–2	4th	
1995	WPI	4–5	3–3	5th	
1996	WPI	2–8	0–6	7th	
1997	WPI	4–6	2–4	5th	
1998	WPI	4–5	3–3	T–4th	
WPI:		24–32	16–18		
UMass Minutemen (Colonial Athletic Association) (2009–2011)
2009	UMass	5–6	3–5	T–8th	
2010	UMass	6–5	4–4	5th	
2011	UMass	5–6	0–0*	N/A	
UMass:		16–17	7–9		
Total:		40–49			
National championship Conference title Conference division title or championship game berth

*UMass' conference record is listed as 0–0 because they were in the process of transitioning to FBS.
