= 2011 Maine Black Bears football team =

American college football season

2011 Maine Black Bears football

FCS Playoffs Quarterfinals, L 23–35 vs. Georgia Southern
- Conference: Colonial Athletic Association

Ranking
- Sports Network: No. 13
- FCS Coaches: No. 13
- Record: 9–4 (6–2 CAA)
- Head coach: Jack Cosgrove (19th season)
- Offensive coordinator: Kevin Bourgoin
- Defensive coordinator: Joe Rossi
- Home stadium: Alfond Stadium

2011 Colonial Athletic Association football standings
	Conf.			Overall
Team	W		L	W		L
No. 9 Towson $^	7	–	1	9	–	3
No. 10 Old Dominion ^	6	–	2	10	–	3
No. 8 Maine ^	6	–	2	9	–	4
No. 11 New Hampshire ^	6	–	2	8	–	4
No. 17 Delaware	5	–	3	7	–	4
No. 15 James Madison ^	5	–	3	8	–	5
William & Mary	3	–	5	5	–	6
Rhode Island	2	–	6	3	–	8
Villanova	1	–	7	2	–	9
Richmond	0	–	8	3	–	8
UMass *	0	–	0	5	–	6
$ – Conference champion; ^ – FCS playoff participant; * – UMass' conference record was 0–0 because they were transitioning to FBS.; Rankings from The Sports Network poll

The 2011 Maine Black Bears football team represented the University of Maine in the 2011 NCAA Division I FCS football season. The Black Bears were led by 19th-year head coach Jack Cosgrove and played their home games at Alfond Stadium. They are a member of the Colonial Athletic Association. They finished the season 9–4, 6–2 in CAA play to finish in a three way tie for second place. They received an at-large bid into the FCS playoffs where they defeated Appalachian State in the second round before falling to Georgia Southern in the quarterfinals.

== Schedule ==
Date	Time	Opponent	Rank	Site	TV	Result	Attendance
September 3	5:00 PM	Bryant*		Alfond Stadium; Orono, ME		W 28–13	6,041
September 10	1:00 PM	at Pittsburgh*		Heinz Field; Pittsburgh, PA	ESPN3	L 29–35	41,230
September 17	6:00 PM	at Albany*		University Field; Albany, NY	ESPN3	W 31–15	4,944
October 1	3:00 PM	No. 6 Delaware		Alfond Stadium; Orono, ME	TWC9	W 31–17	6,000
October 8	3:30 PM	at No. 7 James Madison	No. 19	Bridgeforth Stadium; Harrisonburg, VA	WABI	W 25–24 ^{OT}	24,023
October 15	1:00 PM	Rhode Island	No. 12	Alfond Stadium; Orono, ME	CSNNE	W 27–21	7,256
October 22	3:30 PM	at No. 18 Richmond	No. 9	Robins Stadium; Richmond, VA	WABI	W 23–22	8,700
October 29	3:30 PM	at Villanova	No. 8	Villanova Stadium; Villanova, PA		W 41–25	3,201
November 5	12:30 PM	No. 14 Towson	No. 7	Alfond Stadium; Orono, ME		L 30–40	5,258
November 12	12:30 PM	UMass	No. 13	Alfond Stadium; Orono, ME	WABI/CSN	W 32–21	4,460
November 19	12:00 PM	at No. 12 New Hampshire	No. 11	Cowell Stadium; Durham, NH (Battle for the Brice–Cowell Musket)	WABI	L 27–30	8,536
December 3	2:00 PM	at No. 9 Appalachian State*	No. 13	Kidd Brewer Stadium; Boone, NC (NCAA Division I Second Round)	ESPN3	W 34–12	15,291
December 10	2:00 PM	at No. 3 Georgia Southern*	No. 13	Paulson Stadium; Statesboro, GA (NCAA Division I Quarterfinal)	ESPN3	L 23–35	12,886
*Non-conference game; Rankings from The Sports Network Poll released prior to the game; All times are in Eastern time

== After the season ==
The following Black Bear was selected in the 2012 NFL draft after the season.

Round	Pick	Player	Position	NFL club
4	133	Jerron McMillian	Defensive back	Green Bay Packers
