= New England Nor'easters football =

College football team

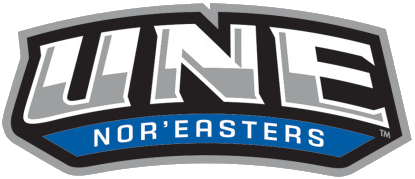
- First season: 2017; 9 years ago
- Athletic director: Heather Davis
- Head coach: Mike Lichten; 7th season, 33–35 (.485)
- Location: Biddeford, Maine
- Stadium: Blue Storm Stadium (capacity: 1,600)
- NCAA division: Division III
- Conference: CNE
- Colors: Blue and white
- All-time record: 33–35 (.485)
- Rivalries: Husson
- Mascot: Nor'easter
- Website: athletics.une.edu

The New England Nor'easters football team represents University of New England in college football at the NCAA Division III level. The Nor'easters are members of the Conference of New England (CNE), fielding its team in the CNE since 2018. The Nor'easters play their home games at Blue Storm Stadium in Biddeford, Maine.

Their head coach is Mike Lichten, who took over the position for the 2017 season.

== History ==
In December 2014, school president Danielle Ripich announced that football would be added as a varsity sport for the university for the 2016 or 2017 season. The team would play on the blue-turfed field of Blue Storm Stadium.

On February 4, 2016, New England hired Mike Lichten from Becker.

== Conference affiliations ==
- Club team (2017)
- Commonwealth Coast Conference / Conference of New England (2018–present)

== List of head coaches ==
=== Key ===
Key to symbols in coaches list
General		Overall		Conference		Postseason (Note: Although the first Rose Bowl Game was played in 1902, it has been continuously played since the 1916 game, and is recognized as the oldest bowl game by the NCAA. "—" indicates any season prior to 1916 when postseason games were not played.)	
No.	Order of coaches (Note: A running total of the number of head coaches, with coaches who served separate tenures being counted only once. Interim head coaches are represented with "Int" and are not counted in the running total. "—" indicates the team played but either without a coach or no coach is on record. "X" indicates an interim year without play.)	GC	Games coached	CW	Conference wins	PW	Postseason wins
DC	Division championships	OW	Overall wins	CL	Conference losses	PL	Postseason losses
CC	Conference championships	OL	Overall losses	CT	Conference ties	PT	Postseason ties
NC	National championships	OT	Overall ties (Note: Overtime rules in college football were introduced in 1996, making ties impossible in the period since.)	C%	Conference winning percentage		
†	Elected to the College Football Hall of Fame	O%	Overall winning percentage (Note: When computing the win–loss percentage, a tie counts as half a win and half a loss.)				

=== Coaches ===
List of head football coaches showing season(s) coached, overall records, conference records, postseason records, championships and selected awards
No.	Name	Season(s)	GC	OW	OL	OT	O%	CW	CL	CT	C%	PW	PL	PT	DC	CC	NC	Awards
1	Mike Lichten	2017–present	68	33	35	0	0.485	–	–	–	–	–	–	–	–	–	–	–

== Year-by-year results ==
National champions	Conference champions	Bowl game berth	Playoff berth

Season	Year	Head Coach	Association	Division	Conference	Record							Postseason	Final ranking
Season	Year	Head Coach	Association	Division	Conference	Overall			Conference				Postseason	Final ranking
Season	Year	Head Coach	Association	Division	Conference	Win	Loss	Tie	Finish	Win	Loss	Tie	Postseason	Final ranking
New England Nor'easters
2017	2017	Mike Lichten	Club team											
2018	2018	Mike Lichten	NCAA	Division III	CCC	2	7	0	T-5th	1	5	0	—	—
2019	2019	Mike Lichten	NCAA	Division III	CCC	4	6	0	T-6th	2	5	0	—	—
Season canceled due to COVID-19
2021	2021	Mike Lichten	NCAA	Division III	CCC / CNE	4	5	0	5th	2	4	0	—	—
2022	2022	Mike Lichten	NCAA	Division III	CCC / CNE	5	5	0	T-3rd	3	4	0	—	—
2023	2023	Mike Lichten	NCAA	Division III	CCC / CNE	6	4	0	4th	2	3	0	—	—
2024	2024	Mike Lichten	NCAA	Division III	CCC / CNE	4	6	0	T-4th	2	3	0	—	—
2025	2025	Mike Lichten	NCAA	Division III	CCC / CNE	8	2	0	3rd	5	2	0	—	—
