= 2011 Villanova Wildcats football team =

American college football season

2011 Villanova Wildcats football
- Conference: Colonial Athletic Association
- Record: 2–9 (1–7 CAA)
- Head coach: Andy Talley (27th season)
- Offensive coordinator: Sam Venuto (13th season)
- Offensive scheme: Multiple spread
- Defensive coordinator: Mark Reardon (7th season)
- Base defense: 4–2–5
- Home stadium: Villanova Stadium

2011 Colonial Athletic Association football standings
	Conf.			Overall
Team	W		L	W		L
No. 9 Towson $^	7	–	1	9	–	3
No. 10 Old Dominion ^	6	–	2	10	–	3
No. 8 Maine ^	6	–	2	9	–	4
No. 11 New Hampshire ^	6	–	2	8	–	4
No. 17 Delaware	5	–	3	7	–	4
No. 15 James Madison ^	5	–	3	8	–	5
William & Mary	3	–	5	5	–	6
Rhode Island	2	–	6	3	–	8
Villanova	1	–	7	2	–	9
Richmond	0	–	8	3	–	8
UMass *	0	–	0	5	–	6
$ – Conference champion; ^ – FCS playoff participant; * – UMass' conference record was 0–0 because they were transitioning to FBS.; Rankings from The Sports Network poll

The 2011 Villanova Wildcats football team represented Villanova University in the 2011 NCAA Division I FCS football season. The Wildcats were led by 27th year head coach Andy Talley and played their home games at Villanova Stadium. They are a member of the Colonial Athletic Association. They finished the season 2–9, 1–7 in CAA play to finish in ninth place.

== Schedule ==
Date	Time	Opponent	Rank	Site	TV	Result	Attendance
September 1	7:00 pm	at Temple*	No. 14	Lincoln Financial Field; Philadelphia, PA (Mayor's Cup)	ESPN3	L 7–42	32,368
September 10	7:00 pm	at Towson	No. 20	Johnny Unitas Stadium; Towson, MD		L 10–31	7,696
September 17	3:30 pm	Monmouth*		Villanova Stadium; Villanova, PA		L 9–20	11,817
September 24	7:00 pm	at Pennsylvania*		Franklin Field; Philadelphia, PA		W 30–21	10,071
October 1	12:00 pm	No. 11 William & Mary		Villanova Stadium; Villanova, PA	TCN	L 16–20	6,027
October 8	12:00 pm	at No. 6 New Hampshire		Cowell Stadium; Durham, NH		L 17–47	5,760
October 15	1:30 pm	at No. 13 James Madison		Bridgeforth Stadium; Harrisonburg, VA		L 10–34	25,047
October 22	3:30 pm	No. 21 Old Dominion		Villanova Stadium; Villanova, PA		L 14–37	7,471
October 29	3:30 pm	No. 8 Maine		Villanova Stadium; Villanova, PA		L 25–41	3,201
November 5	3:30 pm	at UMass		Warren McGuirk Alumni Stadium; Hadley, MA	TCN	W 35–17	10,012
November 19	3:30 pm	vs. No. 15 Delaware		PPL Park; Chester, PA (Battle of the Blue)	TCN	L 16–26	14,107
*Non-conference game; Rankings from The Sports Network Poll released prior to the game; All times are in Eastern time
