= 2012 NCAA Division I Football Championship Game =

Postseason college football game

2012 NCAA Division I Football Championship
- FCS National Championship Game
Sam Houston State Bearkats	North Dakota State Bison
(11–0)	(10–1)
Southland	MVFC
6	17
Head coach: Willie Fritz	Head coach: Craig Bohl
TSN / Seed; 1 / 1	TSN / Seed; 4 / 2
	1	2	3	4	Total
Sam Houston State	0	6	0	0	6
North Dakota State	3	0	7	7	17
- Date: January 7, 2012
- Season: 2011
- Stadium: Pizza Hut Park
- Location: Frisco, Texas
- MVP: Travis Beck (LB, North Dakota State)
- Favorite: Sam Houston State by 3
- Referee: Tony Marcella (CAA)
- Attendance: 20,586

United States TV coverage
- Network: ESPN2
- Announcers: Dave Neal (play-by-play), David Diaz-Infante (color), Allison Williams (sideline)

The 2012 NCAA Division I Football Championship Game was a postseason college football game between the North Dakota State Bison and the Sam Houston State Bearkats. It was played on January 7, 2012, at Pizza Hut Park in Frisco, Texas. The culminating game of the 2011 NCAA Division I FCS football season, it was won by North Dakota State, 17–6.

With sponsorship by Enterprise Rent-A-Car, the game was officially known as the NCAA FCS Championship presented by Enterprise Rent-A-Car. This was the final day that the name of the venue was officially Pizza Hut Park, although ESPN2 referred to it as FC Dallas Stadium during its broadcast.

== Teams ==
The participants of the Championship Game were the finalists of the 2011 FCS Playoffs, which began with a 20-team bracket.

=== North Dakota State Bison ===
North Dakota State finished their regular season with a 10–1 record (7–1 in conference), including a win over Minnesota of the FBS. As the second-seed in the tournament, the Bison defeated James Madison, Lehigh, and third-seed Georgia Southern to reach the final. This was North Dakota State's first appearance in an FCS/Division I-AA title game.

=== Sam Houston State Bearkats ===
Sam Houston State finished their regular season with an 11–0 record (7–0 in conference), including a win over New Mexico of the FBS. As the first-seed in the tournament, the Bearkats defeated Stony Brook, Montana State, and fourth-seed Montana to reach the final. This was also Sam Houston State's first appearance in an FCS/Division I-AA championship game.

== Game summary ==
First-half scoring was limited to three field goals, with the Bearkats holding a 6–3 lead at halftime. The only second-half scoring was a pair of touchdowns by the Bison; the first setup by a fake punt that gained 27 yards, and the second following a 63-yard interception return by the game's MVP, linebacker Travis Beck. The Bison won their first FCS championship via the 17–6 final score.

=== Scoring summary ===
Scoring summary

Quarter	Time	Drive			Team	Scoring information	Score	
Quarter	Time	Plays	Yards	TOP	Team	Scoring information	SHSU	NSDU
1	0:03	10	67	5:56	NDSU	19-yard field goal by Ryan Jastram	0	3
2	2:18	9	41	4:11	SHSU	24-yard field goal by Craig Alaniz	3	3
2	0:40	7	25	1:04	SHSU	31-yard field goal by Alaniz	6	3
3	12:47	5	72	2:13	NDSU	D. J. McNorton 39-yard touchdown reception from Brock Jensen, Jastram kick good	6	10
4	8:45	1	1	0:03	NDSU	Jensen 1-yard touchdown run, Jastram kick good	6	17
"TOP" = time of possession. For other American football terms, see Glossary of American football.							6	17

=== Game statistics ===
	1	2	3	4	Total
No. 1 Bearkats	0	6	0	0	6
No. 2 Bison	3	0	7	7	17

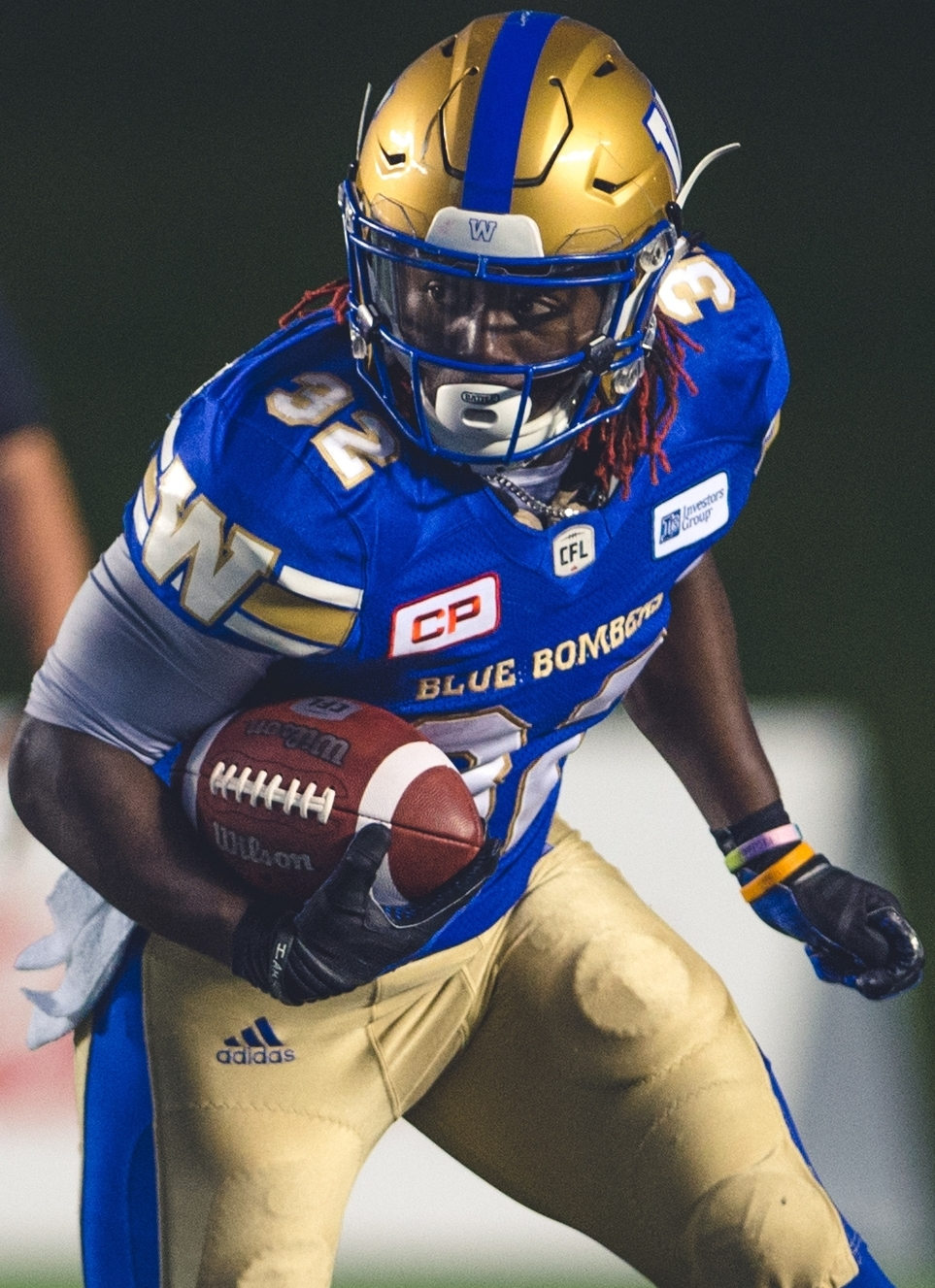
Sam Houston State running back Timothy Flanders

Statistics	SHSU	NDSU
First downs	12	9
Plays–yards	74–210	54–235
Rushes–yards	42–95	34–115
Passing yards	115	120
Passing: comp–att–int	12–32–2	10–20–1
Time of possession	33:05	26:55

Team	Category	Player	Statistics
Sam Houston State	Passing	Brian Bell	12–31, 115 yds, 2 INT
Sam Houston State	Rushing	Timothy Flanders	21 car, 84 yds
Sam Houston State	Receiving	Torrance Williams	3 rec, 53 yds
North Dakota State	Passing	Brock Jensen	10–20, 120 yds, 1 TD, 1 INT
North Dakota State	Rushing	D. J. McNorton	14 car, 39 yds
North Dakota State	Receiving	D. J. McNorton	2 rec, 35 yds, 1 TD
