= 2011 UMass Minutemen football team =

American college football season

2011 UMass Minutemen football
- Conference: Colonial Athletic Association
- Record: 5–6 (3-5 CAA)
- Head coach: Kevin Morris (3rd season)
- Offensive coordinator: Brian Picucci (3rd season)
- Offensive scheme: Pro-style
- Defensive coordinator: Frank Forcucci (1st season)
- Base defense: 4–3
- Home stadium: Warren McGuirk Alumni Stadium

2011 Colonial Athletic Association football standings
	Conf.			Overall
Team	W		L	W		L
No. 9 Towson $^	7	–	1	9	–	3
No. 10 Old Dominion ^	6	–	2	10	–	3
No. 8 Maine ^	6	–	2	9	–	4
No. 11 New Hampshire ^	6	–	2	8	–	4
No. 17 Delaware	5	–	3	7	–	4
No. 15 James Madison ^	5	–	3	8	–	5
William & Mary	3	–	5	5	–	6
Rhode Island	2	–	6	3	–	8
Villanova	1	–	7	2	–	9
Richmond	0	–	8	3	–	8
UMass *	0	–	0	5	–	6
$ – Conference champion; ^ – FCS playoff participant; * – UMass' conference record was 0–0 because they were transitioning to FBS.; Rankings from The Sports Network poll

The 2011 UMass Minutemen football team represented the University of Massachusetts Amherst in the 2011 NCAA Division I FCS football season as a member of the Colonial Athletic Association. The team was coached by Kevin Morris and played its home games at Warren McGuirk Alumni Stadium in Hadley, Massachusetts, with the exception of the second annual Colonial Clash, which was played at Gillette Stadium.

The 2011 season was the team's last as a member of the CAA, as they began their transition to NCAA Division I FBS play. Because of this, they were ineligible for post season play.

They finished the season 5–6, with a 3–5 record against members of the CAA. They did not occupy a spot in the CAA standings due to their transition to the FBS.

Two days after the final game of the season, Kevin Morris was fired from his position as head coach.

== Schedule ==
Highlights of the 2011 schedule, which was the final FCS schedule for the Minutemen, included:

- The season opening night game at in-state rival Holy Cross.
- A game against FBS and in-state rival Boston College.
- The Colonial Clash matchup against New Hampshire at Gillette Stadium.
- The final game at McGuirk Stadium for the immediate future against James Madison.

Date	Time	Opponent	Rank	Site	TV	Result	Attendance
September 1	8:00 p.m.	at Holy Cross*	No. 25	Fitton Field; Worcester, MA	CBS Sports Network	W 24–16	15,942
September 17	6:30 p.m.	Rhode Island	No. 21	McGuirk Stadium; Hadley, MA	CSN NE	W 36–27	11,167
September 24	1:00 p.m.	at Boston College*	No. 17	Alumni Stadium; Chestnut Hill, MA (rivalry)	ESPN3	L 17–45	30,176
October 1	6:00 p.m.	at Old Dominion	No. 20	S. B. Ballard Stadium; Norfolk, VA		L 33–48	19,818
October 8	6:00 p.m.	Central Connecticut*		McGuirk Stadium; Hadley, MA		W 42–26	11,736
October 15	3:30 p.m.	at No. 9 Delaware		Delaware Stadium; Newark, DE	CSN NE/Comcast Network	W 28–10	21,902
October 22	3:30 p.m.	vs. No. 13 New Hampshire	No. 22	Gillette Stadium; Foxboro, MA (Colonial Clash)	CSN NE	L 21–27	24,022
October 29	1:00 p.m.	at Richmond		Robins Stadium; Richmond, VA		W 28–7	8,700
November 5	3:30 p.m.	Villanova^{†}		McGuirk Stadium; Hadley, MA	CSN NE/Comcast Network	L 17–35	10,012
November 12	12:30 p.m.	at No. 13 Maine		Alfond Stadium; Orono, ME		L 21–32	4,460
November 19	1:00 p.m.	No. 19 James Madison		McGuirk Stadium; Hadley, MA		L 17–34	7,103
*Non-conference game; ^{†}Homecoming; Rankings from The Sports Network Poll released prior to the game; All times are in Eastern time
