= Lichten =

Lichten is a surname. Notable people with the surname include:

- Joseph L. Lichten (1906–1987), Polish-American lawyer and diplomat
- Mike Lichten, American football coach

== See also ==
- Lichnov (Bruntál District), village in the Czech Republic
