= 2011 Towson Tigers football team =

American college football season

2011 Towson Tigers football

CAA champion

NCAA Division I Second Round, L 38–40 vs. Lehigh
- Conference: Colonial Athletic Association

Ranking
- Sports Network: No. 8
- FCS Coaches: No. 9
- Record: 9–3 (7–1 CAA)
- Head coach: Rob Ambrose (3rd season)
- Offensive coordinator: John Donatelli
- Defensive coordinator: Matt Hachmann
- Home stadium: Johnny Unitas Stadium

2011 Colonial Athletic Association football standings
	Conf.			Overall
Team	W		L	W		L
No. 9 Towson $^	7	–	1	9	–	3
No. 10 Old Dominion ^	6	–	2	10	–	3
No. 8 Maine ^	6	–	2	9	–	4
No. 11 New Hampshire ^	6	–	2	8	–	4
No. 17 Delaware	5	–	3	7	–	4
No. 15 James Madison ^	5	–	3	8	–	5
William & Mary	3	–	5	5	–	6
Rhode Island	2	–	6	3	–	8
Villanova	1	–	7	2	–	9
Richmond	0	–	8	3	–	8
UMass *	0	–	0	5	–	6
$ – Conference champion; ^ – FCS playoff participant; * – UMass' conference record was 0–0 because they were transitioning to FBS.; Rankings from The Sports Network poll

The 2011 Towson Tigers football team represented Towson University in the 2011 NCAA Division I FCS football season. The Tigers were led by third-year head coach Rob Ambrose and played their home games at Johnny Unitas Stadium. They are a member of the Colonial Athletic Association (CAA). They finished the season 9–3, 7–1 in CAA play to win the conference championship. They received the CAA's automatic bid into the FCS playoffs where they lost in the second round to Lehigh.

== Schedule ==
Date	Time	Opponent	Rank	Site	TV	Result	Attendance
September 3	7:00 pm	Morgan State*		Johnny Unitas Stadium; Towson, MD	CSN	W 42–3	9,759
September 10	7:00 pm	No. 20 Villanova		Johnny Unitas Stadium; Towson, MD		W 31–10	7,696
September 24	7:00 pm	Colgate*^{†}		Johnny Unitas Stadium; Towson, MD		W 42–17	9,919
October 1	2:30 pm	at Maryland*	No. 23	Byrd Stadium; College Park, MD	FSN	L 3–28	35,573
October 8	7:30 pm	No. 14 Richmond	No. 25	Johnny Unitas Stadium; Towson, MD		W 31–28	7,587
October 15	3:30 pm	at No. 18 Old Dominion	No. 17	Foreman Field; Norfolk, VA		W 39–35	19,818
October 22	3:30 pm	at No. 14 William & Mary	No. 15	Zable Stadium; Williamsburg, VA		W 38–27	12,259
October 29	7:00 pm	No. 21 Delaware	No. 13	Johnny Unitas Stadium; Towson, MD	TCN	L 30–35	8,122
November 5	12:30 pm	at No. 7 Maine	No. 14	Alfond Stadium; Orono, ME	CSN	W 40–30	5,258
November 12	3:30 pm	No. 7 New Hampshire	No. 12	Johnny Unitas Stadium; Towson, MD		W 56–42	8,366
November 19	12:30 pm	at Rhode Island	No. 8	Meade Stadium; Kingston, RI		W 28–17	2,883
December 3	3:30 pm	No. 6 Lehigh*	No. 8	Johnny Unitas Stadium; Towson, MD (NCAA Division I Second Round)	ESPN3	L 38–40	11,196
*Non-conference game; ^{†}Homecoming; Rankings from The Sports Network Poll released prior to the game; All times are in Eastern time
