= Battle of the Blue =

American college football rivalry

- Delaware Fightin' Blue Hens Villanova Wildcats
- Sport: College football
- First meeting: November 11, 1895; Delaware, 10–6
- Latest meeting: November 23, 2024; Villanova, 38–28
- Trophy: Battle of the Blue Trophy

Statistics
- Total meetings: 58
- All-time series: Villanova leads, 35–22–1
- Trophy series: Villanova leads, 16–2
- Largest victory: Delaware, 49–7 (1974)
- Longest win streak: Villanova, 8 (2012–2019)
- Current win streak: Villanova, 3 (2021–present)

Locations of Delaware and Villanova

The Battle of the Blue was an annual college football rivalry game between the University of Delaware Fightin' Blue Hens and Villanova University Wildcats. The first game was played between the two teams in 1895 and was played annually from 1964 to 1980, when Villanova dropped football. The rivalry resumed when Villanova restarted its football program in 1988. Beginning in 2007, the annual Delaware–Villanova game became known as Battle of the Blue. As part of this concept, the winning team gets to keep the Battle of the Blue Trophy at its institution for the year and is responsible for bringing the trophy to the following installment of the rivalry game. The trophy consists of a football with a Villanova logo and the Wildcat shade of blue on one side and the Blue Hen logo and the Delaware shade of blue on the other side. The ball sits in a wooden platform and the scores of each game are engraved on the base of the trophy. Villanova had possession of the trophy for the first four years, until Delaware won in 2011.

Three times within the first four years of the rivalry's existence, one of the teams went on to reach the NCAA Division I Football Championship. In 2007, the Wildcats upset #9 Delaware 19–14 to claim the first Battle of the Blue Trophy. Delaware would later reach the FCS National Championship game before falling to the Appalachian State Mountaineers 49–21. In 2009, Villanova would win their first-ever appearance in the national championship, defeating the Montana Grizzlies 23–21. The 2010 meeting marked the first time the game had gone into overtime, with the Wildcats securing another upset win over the #1-ranked Delaware team on a recovered fumble. Once again, however, Delaware would reach the national championship, but would lose to Eastern Washington, 20–19.

In 2011, the Battle of the Blue was the first American football game to be played at the venue now known as Subaru Park in Chester, Pennsylvania, in which Delaware beat Villanova to earn the trophy for the first time.

On November 27, 2023, it was announced that the Delaware Fightin' Blue Hens football program had accepted an invitation to move up to the FBS Subdivision and would join Conference USA prior to the 2025 football season. There are no future meetings scheduled.

== Game results ==
Delaware victories	Villanova victories	Tie games

No.	Date	Location	Winner	Score
1	November 23, 1895	Villanova, PA	Delaware	10–6
2	October 3, 1896	Newark, DE	Villanova	14–0
3	October 18, 1924	Villanova, PA	Villanova	17–3
4	October 20, 1962	Newark, DE	Villanova	22–10
5	October 17, 1964	Villanova, PA	Villanova	34–0
6	October 16, 1965	Newark, DE	Delaware	24–21
7	October 15, 1966	Villanova, PA	Villanova	16–14
8	September 30, 1967	Newark, DE	Villanova	21–13
9	September 28, 1968	Villanova, PA	Villanova	16–0
10	September 27, 1969	Newark, DE	Villanova	36–33
11	October 3, 1970	Newark, DE	Villanova	34–31
12	October 2, 1971	Newark, DE	Delaware	23–15
13	November 4, 1972	Villanova, PA	Delaware	14–7
14	November 3, 1973	Villanova, PA	Villanova	24–7
15	November 2, 1974	Newark, DE	Delaware	49–7
16	November 1, 1975	Villanova, PA	Delaware	14–13
17	October 16, 1976	Newark, DE	Tie	24–24
18	October 15, 1977	Villanova, PA	Villanova	33–16
19	November 11, 1978	Newark, DE	Delaware	23–22
20	October 13, 1979	Villanova, PA	Delaware	21–20
21	November 1, 1980	Newark, DE	Delaware	17–7
22	October 15, 1988	Villanova, PA	Delaware	10–7
23	October 14, 1989	Newark, DE	Villanova	20–11
24	October 13, 1990	Villanova, PA	Delaware	19–15
25	October 19, 1991	Newark, DE	Delaware	38–28
26	October 17, 1992	Villanova, PA	Delaware	21–20
27	October 16, 1993	Newark, DE	Delaware	19–7
28	September 17, 1994	Villanova, PA	Delaware	38–31
29	September 16, 1995	Newark, DE	Delaware	28–7
30	September 14, 1996	Villanova, PA	Villanova	27–0

No.	Date	Location	Winner	Score
31	September 13, 1997	Newark, DE	Villanova	35–25
32	September 12, 1998	Villanova, PA	Villanova	34–31
33	November 20, 1999	Villanova, PA	Villanova	51–45 ^{OT}
34	November 18, 2000	Newark, DE	Delaware	59–42
35	November 17, 2001	Villanova, PA	Villanova	19–14
36	November 23, 2002	Newark, DE	Villanova	38–34
37	November 22, 2003	Villanova, PA	Delaware	20–17
38	November 20, 2004	Newark, DE	Delaware	41–35
39	November 19, 2005	Villanova, PA	Delaware	38–13
40	November 18, 2006	Newark, DE	Villanova	28–27
41	November 17, 2007	Villanova, PA	Villanova	19–14
42	November 22, 2008	Newark, DE	Villanova	21–7
43	November 21, 2009	Villanova, PA	Villanova	31–12
44	November 20, 2010	Newark, DE	Villanova	28–21^{OT}
45	November 19, 2011	Chester, PA	Delaware	26–16
46	November 17, 2012	Newark, DE	Villanova	41–10
47	November 23, 2013	Chester, PA	Villanova	35–34
48	November 22, 2014	Newark, DE	Villanova	35–28
49	September 19, 2015	Villanova, PA	Villanova	28–21
50	November 19, 2016	Newark, DE	Villanova	41–10
51	November 18, 2017	Villanova, PA	Villanova	28–7
52	November 17, 2018	Newark, DE	Villanova	42–21
53	November 23, 2019	Villanova, PA	Villanova	55–33
54	April 17, 2021	Villanova, PA	Delaware	27–20
55	November 20, 2021	Newark, DE	Villanova	21–13
56	November 19, 2022	Villanova, PA	Villanova	29–26
57	November 18, 2023	Newark, DE	Villanova	35–7
58	November 23, 2024	Villanova, PA	Villanova	38–28
Series: Villanova leads 35–22–1

== See also ==
- List of NCAA college football rivalry games
