= 2011 New Hampshire Wildcats football team =

American college football season

2011 New Hampshire Wildcats football

FCS Playoffs Second Round, L 25–26 vs. Montana State
- Conference: Colonial Athletic Association

Ranking
- Sports Network: No. 11
- FCS Coaches: No. 12
- Record: 8–4 (6–2 CAA)
- Head coach: Sean McDonnell (13th season)
- Offensive coordinator: Tim Cramsey (3rd season)
- Defensive coordinator: John Lyons (1st season)
- Home stadium: Cowell Stadium

2011 Colonial Athletic Association football standings
	Conf.			Overall
Team	W		L	W		L
No. 9 Towson $^	7	–	1	9	–	3
No. 10 Old Dominion ^	6	–	2	10	–	3
No. 8 Maine ^	6	–	2	9	–	4
No. 11 New Hampshire ^	6	–	2	8	–	4
No. 17 Delaware	5	–	3	7	–	4
No. 15 James Madison ^	5	–	3	8	–	5
William & Mary	3	–	5	5	–	6
Rhode Island	2	–	6	3	–	8
Villanova	1	–	7	2	–	9
Richmond	0	–	8	3	–	8
UMass *	0	–	0	5	–	6
$ – Conference champion; ^ – FCS playoff participant; * – UMass' conference record was 0–0 because they were transitioning to FBS.; Rankings from The Sports Network poll

The 2011 New Hampshire Wildcats football team represented the University of New Hampshire in the 2011 NCAA Division I FCS football season. The Wildcats were led by 13th-year head coach Sean McDonnell and played their home games at Cowell Stadium. They are a member of the Colonial Athletic Association. They finished the season 8–4, 6–2 in CAA play to finish in a three-way tie for second place. They received an at-large bid into the FCS playoffs where they lost in the second round to Montana State.

== Schedule ==
Date	Time	Opponent	Rank	Site	TV	Result	Attendance
September 1	7:00 pm	at Toledo*	No. 10	Glass Bowl; Toledo, OH	ESPN3	L 22–58	20,106
September 10	12:30 pm	at No. 14 Lehigh*	No. 13	Goodman Stadium; Bethlehem, PA		W 48–41 ^{OT}	7,519
September 24	3:30 pm	at No. 5 Richmond	No. 11	E. Claiborne Robins Stadium; Richmond, VA	CSN	W 45–43	8,700
October 1	12:00 pm	Holy Cross*	No. 7	Cowell Stadium; Durham, NH	UNHTV	W 39–32	8,307
October 8	12:00 pm	Villanova	No. 6	Cowell Stadium; Durham, NH	UNHTV	W 47–17	5,760
October 15	12:00 pm	at No. 16 William & Mary	No. 6	Zable Stadium; Williamsburg, VA	CSN	L 10–24	9,642
October 22	3:30 pm	vs. No. 22 UMass	No. 13	Gillette Stadium; Foxborough, MA (Colonial Clash)	CSN	W 27–21	24,022
October 29	12:00 pm	Rhode Island	No. 11	Cowell Stadium; Durham, NH	CSN	W 31–24	10,554
November 5	12:00 pm	No. 13 James Madison	No. 9	Cowell Stadium; Durham, NH	UNHTV	W 28–10	4,466
November 12	3:30 pm	at No. 12 Towson	No. 7	Johnny Unitas Stadium; Towson, MD		L 42–56	8,366
November 19	12:00 pm	No. 11 Maine	No. 12	Cowell Stadium; Durham, NH (Battle for the Brice–Cowell Musket)	CSN	W 30–27	8,536
December 3	3:00 pm	at No. 7 Montana State*	No. 11	Bozeman, MT (NCAA Division I Second Round)	ESPN3	L 25–26	11,367
*Non-conference game; Rankings from The Sports Network Poll released prior to the game; All times are in Eastern time
