= 2011 Delaware Fightin' Blue Hens football team =

American college football season

2011 Delaware Fightin' Blue Hens football
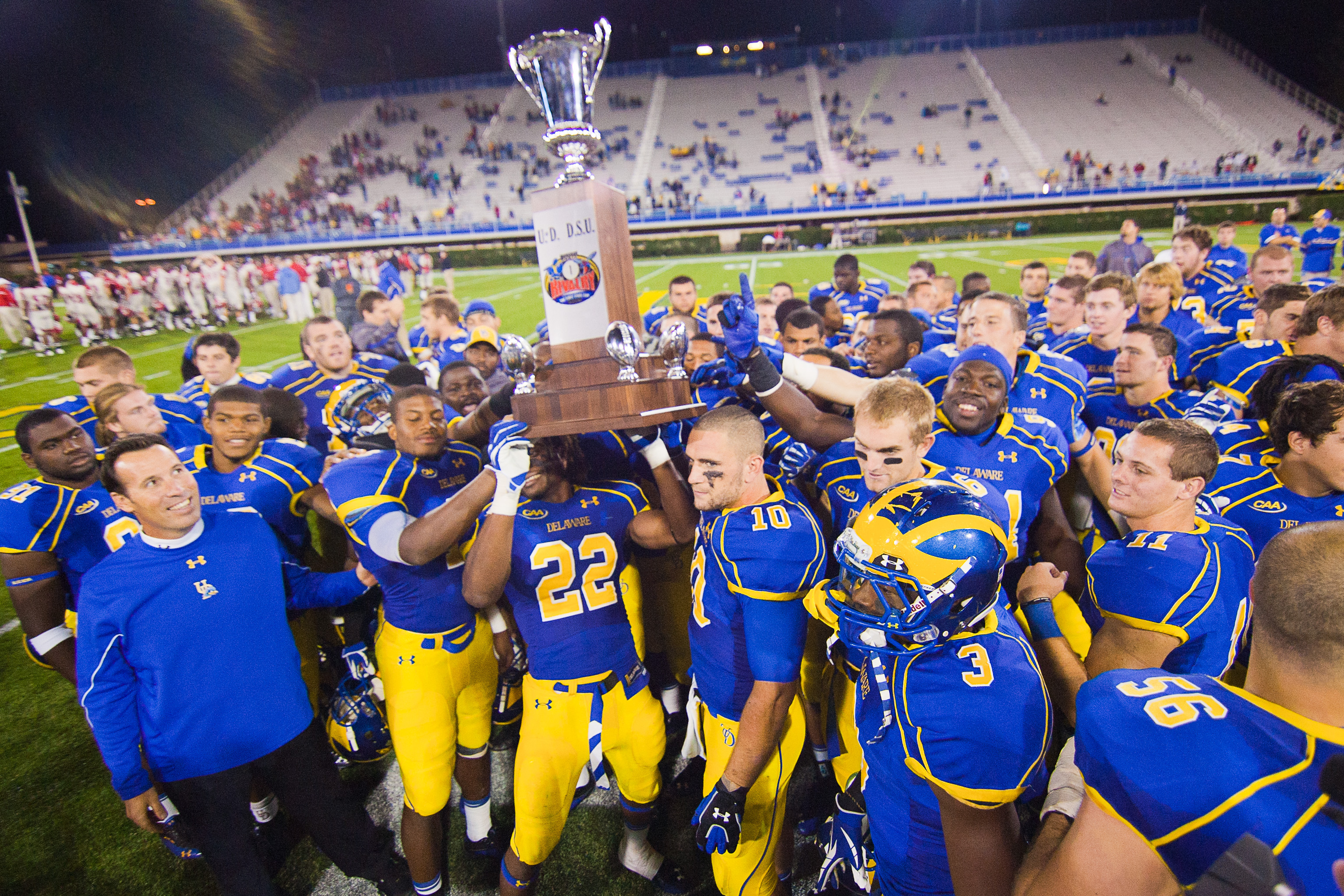
- Delaware players hold up the first state cup trophy after defeating Delaware State 45–0
- Conference: Colonial Athletic Association

Ranking
- Sports Network: No. 17
- FCS Coaches: No. 20
- Record: 7–4 (5–3 CAA)
- Head coach: K. C. Keeler (10th season)
- Offensive coordinator: Jim Hofher (3rd season)
- Offensive scheme: Spread
- Defensive coordinator: Nick Rapone (6th season)
- Base defense: 4–3
- Home stadium: Delaware Stadium

2011 Colonial Athletic Association football standings
	Conf.			Overall
Team	W		L	W		L
No. 9 Towson $^	7	–	1	9	–	3
No. 10 Old Dominion ^	6	–	2	10	–	3
No. 8 Maine ^	6	–	2	9	–	4
No. 11 New Hampshire ^	6	–	2	8	–	4
No. 17 Delaware	5	–	3	7	–	4
No. 15 James Madison ^	5	–	3	8	–	5
William & Mary	3	–	5	5	–	6
Rhode Island	2	–	6	3	–	8
Villanova	1	–	7	2	–	9
Richmond	0	–	8	3	–	8
UMass *	0	–	0	5	–	6
$ – Conference champion; ^ – FCS playoff participant; * – UMass' conference record was 0–0 because they were transitioning to FBS.; Rankings from The Sports Network poll

The 2011 Delaware Fightin' Blue Hens football team represented the University of Delaware as a member of the Colonial Athletic Association (CAA) during the 2011 NCAA Division I FCS football season. Led by tenth-year head coach K. C. Keeler, the Fightin' Blue Hens compiled an overall record of 7–4 with a mark of 5–3 in conference play, tying for fifth place in the CAA. Delaware was not invited to the NCAA Division I Football Championship playoffs. The team played home games at Delaware Stadium in Newark, Delaware.

== Schedule ==
Date	Time	Opponent	Rank	Site	TV	Result	Attendance
September 3	3:30 pm	at Navy*	No. 5	Navy–Marine Corps Memorial Stadium; Annapolis, MD	CBSSN	L 17–40	34,117
September 10	6:00 pm	West Chester*	No. 8	Delaware Stadium; Newark, DE (Band Day, rivalry)		W 28–17	19,593
September 17	6:00 pm	Delaware State*	No. 7	Delaware Stadium; Newark, DE (Route 1 Rivalry)		W 45–0	18,011
September 24	12:00 pm	Old Dominion	No. 7	Delaware Stadium; Newark, DE (Hall of Fame Day)	CSN	W 27–17	16,789
October 1	3:00 pm	at Maine	No. 6	Alfond Stadium; Orono, ME	WABI	L 17–31	6,000
October 8	6:00 pm	No. 9 William & Mary	No. 13	Delaware Stadium; Newark, DE (rivalry)		W 21–0	17,808
October 15	3:30 pm	UMass	No. 9	Delaware Stadium; Newark, DE (Parents & Family Weekend)	CSN	L 10–21	21,902
October 22	12:30 pm	at Rhode Island	No. 16	Meade Stadium; Kingston, RI		L 34–38	6,222
October 29	7:00 pm	at No. 13 Towson	No. 21	Johnny Unitas Stadium; Towson, MD	TCN	W 35–30	8,122
November 12	3:30 pm	Richmond^{†}	No. 15	Delaware Stadium; Newark, DE (Senior Day)	TCN	W 24–10	20,008
November 19	3:30 pm	vs. Villanova	No. 15	PPL Park; Chester, PA (Battle of the Blue)	TCN	W 26–16	14,107
*Non-conference game; ^{†}Homecoming; Rankings from The Sports Network Poll released prior to the game; All times are in Eastern time
