= 2011 Richmond Spiders football team =

American college football season

2011 Richmond Spiders football
- Conference: Colonial Athletic Association
- Record: 3–8 (0–8 CAA)
- Head coach: Wayne Lineburg (interim) (1st season)
- Offensive coordinator: Wayne Lineburg
- Defensive coordinator: Bob Trott (2nd year)
- Home stadium: E. Claiborne Robins Stadium

2011 Colonial Athletic Association football standings
| | Conf. | | | Overall |
| Team | W | | L | W | | L |
|---|---|---|---|---|---|---|
| No. 9 Towson $^ | 7 | – | 1 | 9 | – | 3 |
| No. 10 Old Dominion ^ | 6 | – | 2 | 10 | – | 3 |
| No. 8 Maine ^ | 6 | – | 2 | 9 | – | 4 |
| No. 11 New Hampshire ^ | 6 | – | 2 | 8 | – | 4 |
| No. 17 Delaware | 5 | – | 3 | 7 | – | 4 |
| No. 15 James Madison ^ | 5 | – | 3 | 8 | – | 5 |
| William & Mary | 3 | – | 5 | 5 | – | 6 |
| Rhode Island | 2 | – | 6 | 3 | – | 8 |
| Villanova | 1 | – | 7 | 2 | – | 9 |
| Richmond | 0 | – | 8 | 3 | – | 8 |
| UMass * | 0 | – | 0 | 5 | – | 6 |
$ – Conference champion; ^ – FCS playoff participant; * – UMass' conference record was 0–0 because they were transitioning to FBS.; Rankings from The Sports Network poll

The 2011 Richmond Spiders football team represented the University of Richmond during the 2011 NCAA Division I FCS football season. Richmond competed as a member of the Colonial Athletic Association (CAA) under interim head football coach Wayne Lineburg and played its home games at E. Claiborne Robins Stadium.

Latrell Scott, who was entering his second season as the head coach at Richmond, resigned on August 23, 2011, just ten days before the team's opening game. Offensive coordinator Wayne Lineburg was named interim head coach for the 2011 season.

== Schedule ==
Richmond's 2011 schedule kicked off against Football Bowl Subdivision (FBS) team Duke and included other non-conference games against Wagner and VMI. The schedule also included an eight-game CAA slate including a game against new CAA football member Old Dominion and wrapping up against rival William & Mary in the Capital Cup.

| Date | Time | Opponent | Rank | Site | TV | Result | Attendance |
|---|---|---|---|---|---|---|---|
| September 3 | 7:00 pm | at Duke* | No. 16 | Wallace Wade Stadium; Durham, NC | ESPN3 | W 23–21 | 32,741 |
| September 10 | 6:00 pm | Wagner* | No. 9 | Robins Stadium; Richmond, VA | | W 21–6 | 8,700 |
| September 17 | 6:00 pm | VMI* | No. 6 | Robins Stadium; Richmond, VA (rivalry) | | W 34–19 | 8,700 |
| September 24 | 3:30 pm | No. 11 New Hampshire | No. 5 | Robins Stadium; Richmond, VA | CSN | L 43–45 | 8,700 |
| October 1 | 3:30 pm | at No. 9 James Madison | No. 10 | Bridgeforth Stadium; Harrisonburg, VA (rivalry) | CSN | L 7–31 | 25,742 |
| October 8 | 7:30 pm | at No. 25 Towson | No. 14 | Johnny Unitas Stadium; Towson, MD | | L 28–31 | 7,587 |
| October 22 | 3:30 pm | No. 9 Maine^{†} | No. 18 | Robins Stadium; Richmond, VA | | L 22–23 | 8,700 |
| October 29 | 1:00 pm | UMass | | Robins Stadium; Richmond, VA | | L 7–28 | 8,700 |
| November 5 | 12:00 pm | at No. 12 Old Dominion | | Foreman Field; Norfolk, VA | | L 28–42 | 19,818 |
| November 12 | 3:30 pm | at No. 15 Delaware | | Delaware Stadium; Newark, DE | CSN | L 10–24 | 20,008 |
| November 19 | 12:00 pm | William & Mary | | Robins Stadium; Richmond, VA (Capital Cup) | CSN | L 23–25 | 8,700 |
*Non-conference game; ^{†}Homecoming; Rankings from The Sports Network Poll released prior to the game; All times are in Eastern time
