= 2011 William & Mary Tribe football team =

American college football season

2011 William & Mary Tribe football
- Conference: Colonial Athletic Association
- Record: 5–6 (3–5 CAA)
- Head coach: Jimmye Laycock (32nd season)
- Offensive coordinator: Zbig Kepa (19th season)
- Offensive scheme: Pro-style
- Defensive coordinator: Scott Boone (1st season)
- Base defense: 4–3
- Captains: Jonathan Grimes; Marcus Hyde; James Pagliaro; Jake Trantin
- Home stadium: Zable Stadium

2011 Colonial Athletic Association football standings
	Conf.			Overall
Team	W		L	W		L
No. 9 Towson $^	7	–	1	9	–	3
No. 10 Old Dominion ^	6	–	2	10	–	3
No. 8 Maine ^	6	–	2	9	–	4
No. 11 New Hampshire ^	6	–	2	8	–	4
No. 17 Delaware	5	–	3	7	–	4
No. 15 James Madison ^	5	–	3	8	–	5
William & Mary	3	–	5	5	–	6
Rhode Island	2	–	6	3	–	8
Villanova	1	–	7	2	–	9
Richmond	0	–	8	3	–	8
UMass *	0	–	0	5	–	6
$ – Conference champion; ^ – FCS playoff participant; * – UMass' conference record was 0–0 because they were transitioning to FBS.; Rankings from The Sports Network poll

The 2011 William & Mary Tribe football team represented The College of William & Mary in the 2011 NCAA Division I FCS football season. The Tribe were led by 32nd year head coach Jimmye Laycock and played their home games at Zable Stadium. They are a member of the Colonial Athletic Association. They finished the season 5–6, 3–5 in CAA play to finish in seventh place.

== Schedule ==
Date	Time	Opponent	Rank	Site	TV	Result	Attendance
September 3	6:00 pm	at Virginia*	No. 3	Scott Stadium; Charlottesville, VA	ESPN3	L 3–40	51,956
September 10	1:30 pm	at VMI*	No. 5	Alumni Memorial Field; Lexington, Virginia (rivalry)		W 24–7	5,786
September 17	7:00 pm	No. 23 (DII) New Haven*	No. 4	Zable Stadium; Williamsburg, VA		W 13–10	8,649
September 24	7:00 pm	No. 12 James Madison	No. 6	Zable Stadium; Williamsburg, VA (rivalry)	CSN-MA, CSN-NE	L 14–20	12,259
October 1	12:00 pm	at Villanova	No. 11	Villanova Stadium; Philadelphia, PA	TCN, CSN-NE	W 20–16	6,027
October 8	6:00 pm	at No. 13 Delaware	No. 9	Delaware Stadium; Newark, DE (rivalry)		L 0–21	17,808
October 15	12:00 pm	No. 6 New Hampshire	No. 16	Zable Stadium; Williamsburg, VA	TCN, COX 11	W 24–10	9,462
October 22	3:30 pm	No. 15 Towson^{†}	No. 14	Zable Stadium; Williamsburg, VA		L 27–38	12,259
November 5	1:00 pm	at Rhode Island	No. 19	Meade Stadium; Kingston, RI		L 21–24	7,014
November 12	12:00 pm	No. 11 Old Dominion		Zable Stadium; Williamsburg, VA (Battle for the Silver Mace)		L 31–35	12,259
November 19	12:00 pm	at Richmond		E. Claiborne Robins Stadium; Richmond, Virginia (Capital Cup)	CSN-MA	W 25–23	8,700
*Non-conference game; ^{†}Homecoming; Rankings from The Sports Network Poll released prior to the game; All times are in Eastern time
