= Wayne Lineburg =

American football player and coach (born 1974)

Current position
- Title: Assistant head coach and tight ends coach
- Team: Rice
- Conference: AAC

Biographical details
- Born: January 12, 1974 (age 52); Radford, Virginia, U.S.

Playing career
- 1992–1996: Virginia
- Position: Quarterback

Coaching career (HC unless noted)
- 1996–1997: William & Mary (assistant)
- 1998–1999: Virginia (GA)
- 2000–2003: William & Mary (RB)
- 2004–2006: Richmond (OC/RB)
- 2007–2008: Virginia (WR)
- 2009: Virginia (RB)
- 2010: Richmond (OC/RB)
- 2011: Richmond (interim HC)
- 2012–2013: Richmond (AHC/RB/RC)
- 2014: Connecticut (WR/ST)
- 2015–2016: Connecticut (QB)
- 2017–2024: Wake Forest (TE/ST)
- 2025–present: Rice (AHC/TE)

Head coaching record
- Overall: 3–8

Wayne Lineburg (born January 12, 1974) is the former interim head coach of the Richmond Spiders college football team, representing the University of Richmond, for the 2011 season. He was named to the position on August 23, 2011 following the resignation of Latrell Scott. Before taking the head coaching position at Richmond, Lineburg served as the offensive coordinator and running backs coach for one season at Richmond under Scott. He had also previously served as the offensive coordinator and running backs coach at Richmond under Dave Clawson from 2004 through 2006. Lineburg has also held coaching positions at the University of Virginia and the College of William & Mary.

== Head coaching record ==
Year	Team	Overall	Conference	Standing	Bowl/playoffs
Richmond Spiders (Colonial Athletic Association) (2011)
2011	Richmond	3–8	0–8	11th	
Richmond:		3–8	0–8		
Total:		3–8			
