= 2011 NCAA Division I FCS football season =

American college football season

2011 NCAA Division I FCS season

Regular season
- Number of teams: 126
- Duration: September – November
- Payton Award: Bo Levi Mitchell, Eastern Washington
- Buchanan Award: Matt Evans, New Hampshire

Playoff
- Duration: November 26 – December 17
- Championship date: January 7, 2012
- Championship site: Pizza Hut Park, Frisco, TX
- Champion: North Dakota State

NCAA Division I FCS football seasons
- «2010 2012»

The 2011 NCAA Division I FCS football season, part of college football in the United States, was organized by the National Collegiate Athletic Association (NCAA) at the Division I Football Championship Subdivision (FCS) level. The season began on September 1, 2011, and concluded with the 2012 NCAA Division I Football Championship Game on January 7, 2012, at Pizza Hut Park in Frisco, Texas. North Dakota State won their first FCS championship, defeating Sam Houston State by a final score of 17–6.

== Conference changes and new programs ==
School	2010 conference	2011 conference
Lamar	FCS Independent	Southland
Old Dominion	FCS Independent	CAA
Savannah State	FCS Independent	MEAC
South Alabama	New program^{+}	FCS Independent
UTSA	New program	FCS Independent
Texas State	Southland	FCS Independent

+ "unclassified" for 2009 (partial season) and 2010 (full season)

== FCS team wins over FBS teams ==
September 3: Richmond 23, Duke 21
September 3: Sacramento State 29, Oregon State 28^{OT}
September 17: Indiana State 44, Western Kentucky 16
September 24: North Dakota State 37, Minnesota 24
September 24: Sam Houston State 48, New Mexico 45 ^{OT}
September 24: Southern Utah 41, UNLV 16

== Conference standings ==
2011 Big Sky Conference football standings
	Conf.			Overall
Team	W		L	W		L
No. 7 Montana State $^	7	–	1	10	–	3
No. ~~5~~ Montana† ^	5	–	1	6	–	2
Portland State	5	–	3	7	–	4
Eastern Washington	5	–	3	6	–	5
Weber State	5	–	3	5	–	6
Northern Arizona	3	–	5	4	–	7
Sacramento State	3	–	5	4	–	7
Idaho State*	1	–	7	2	–	9
Northern Colorado	0	–	8	0	–	11
$ – Conference champion; ^ – FCS playoff participant; † Montana vacated two conference wins, five total wins, their conference co-championship, and playoff participation (three games, including two of the five total wins) in 2011 * Idaho State ineligible for FCS playoffs due to APR violations; Rankings from The Sports Network poll, using Montana's later-diminished W–L record

2011 Big South Conference football standings
	Conf.			Overall
Team	W		L	W		L
No. 18 Stony Brook $^	6	–	0	9	–	4
No. 25 Liberty	5	–	1	7	–	4
Coastal Carolina	3	–	3	7	–	4
Presbyterian	3	–	3	4	–	7
Gardner–Webb	2	–	4	4	–	7
VMI	2	–	4	2	–	9
Charleston Southern	0	–	6	0	–	11
$ – Conference champion; ^ – FCS playoff participant; Rankings from The Sports Network poll

2011 Colonial Athletic Association football standings
	Conf.			Overall
Team	W		L	W		L
No. 9 Towson $^	7	–	1	9	–	3
No. 10 Old Dominion ^	6	–	2	10	–	3
No. 8 Maine ^	6	–	2	9	–	4
No. 11 New Hampshire ^	6	–	2	8	–	4
No. 17 Delaware	5	–	3	7	–	4
No. 15 James Madison ^	5	–	3	8	–	5
William & Mary	3	–	5	5	–	6
Rhode Island	2	–	6	3	–	8
Villanova	1	–	7	2	–	9
Richmond	0	–	8	3	–	8
UMass *	0	–	0	5	–	6
$ – Conference champion; ^ – FCS playoff participant; * – UMass' conference record was 0–0 because they were transitioning to FBS.; Rankings from The Sports Network poll

2011 Great West Conference football standings
	Conf.			Overall
Team	W		L	W		L
No. 23 North Dakota +	3	–	1	8	–	3
Cal Poly +	3	–	1	6	–	5
South Dakota	2	–	2	6	–	5
Southern Utah	1	–	3	6	–	5
UC Davis	1	–	3	4	–	7
+ – Conference co-champions; Rankings from The Sports Network poll

2011 Ivy League football standings
	Conf.			Overall
Team	W		L	W		L
No. 16 Harvard $	7	–	0	9	–	1
Brown	4	–	3	7	–	3
Dartmouth	4	–	3	5	–	5
Penn	4	–	3	5	–	5
Yale	4	–	3	5	–	5
Cornell	3	–	4	5	–	5
Columbia	1	–	6	1	–	9
Princeton	1	–	6	1	–	9
$ – Conference champion; Rankings from The Sports Network poll

2011 Mid-Eastern Athletic Conference football standings
	Conf.			Overall
Team	W		L	W		L
No. 19 Norfolk State $^	7	–	1	9	–	3
Bethune–Cookman	6	–	2	8	–	3
South Carolina State	6	–	2	7	–	4
Florida A&M	5	–	3	7	–	4
Hampton	5	–	3	7	–	4
Howard	4	–	4	5	–	6
Morgan State	4	–	4	5	–	6
North Carolina A&T	4	–	4	5	–	6
Delaware State	1	–	7	3	–	8
North Carolina Central	1	–	7	2	–	9
Savannah State	1	–	7	1	–	10
$ – Conference champion; ^ – FCS playoff participant; Rankings from The Sports Network poll

2011 Missouri Valley Football Conference standings
	Conf.			Overall
Team	W		L	W		L
No. 1 North Dakota State +^	7	–	1	14	–	1
No. 6 Northern Iowa +^	7	–	1	10	–	3
No. 20 Illinois State	5	–	3	7	–	4
Indiana State	4	–	4	6	–	5
Youngstown State	4	–	4	6	–	5
South Dakota State	4	–	4	5	–	6
Southern Illinois	2	–	6	4	–	7
Missouri State	2	–	6	2	–	9
Western Illinois	1	–	7	2	–	9
+ – Conference co-champions; ^ – FCS playoff participant; Rankings from The Sports Network poll

2011 Northeast Conference football standings
	Conf.			Overall
Team	W		L	W		L
Duquesne +	7	–	1	9	–	2
Albany +^	7	–	1	8	–	4
Bryant	5	–	3	7	–	4
Monmouth	4	–	4	5	–	6
Wagner	4	–	4	4	–	7
Sacred Heart	3	–	5	5	–	6
Central Connecticut	3	–	5	4	–	7
Robert Morris	2	–	6	2	–	9
Saint Francis (PA)	1	–	7	2	–	9
+ – Conference co-champions; ^ – FCS playoff participant

2011 Ohio Valley Conference football standings
	Conf.			Overall
Team	W		L	W		L
No. 21 Tennessee Tech +^	6	–	2	7	–	4
Eastern Kentucky +^	6	–	2	7	–	5
Jacksonville State +	6	–	2	7	–	4
Murray State	5	–	3	7	–	4
Tennessee State	4	–	4	5	–	6
UT Martin	4	–	4	5	–	6
Austin Peay	2	–	6	3	–	8
Southeast Missouri State	2	–	6	3	–	8
Eastern Illinois	1	–	7	2	–	9
+ – Conference co-champions; ^ – FCS playoff participant; Rankings from The Sports Network poll

2011 Patriot League football standings
	Conf.			Overall
Team	W		L	W		L
No. 6 Lehigh $^	6	–	0	11	–	2
Georgetown	4	–	2	8	–	3
Holy Cross	4	–	2	6	–	5
Bucknell	3	–	3	6	–	5
Colgate	2	–	4	5	–	6
Lafayette	2	–	4	4	–	7
Fordham	0	–	6	1	–	10
$ – Conference champion; ^ – FCS playoff participant; Fordham was ineligible for conference title because they offered football scholarships while other Patriot League members did not.; Rankings from The Sports Network poll

2011 Pioneer Football League standings
	Conf.			Overall
Team	W		L	W		L
San Diego +	7	–	1	9	–	2
Drake +	7	–	1	9	–	2
Jacksonville	6	–	2	7	–	4
Campbell	5	–	3	6	–	5
Dayton	4	–	4	6	–	5
Marist	3	–	5	4	–	7
Butler	3	–	5	5	–	6
Davidson	2	–	6	4	–	7
Morehead State	2	–	6	3	–	8
Valparaiso	1	–	7	1	–	10
+ – Conference co-champions

2011 Southern Conference football standings
	Conf.			Overall
Team	W		L	W		L
No. 3 Georgia Southern $^	7	–	1	11	–	3
No. 12 Wofford ^	6	–	2	8	–	4
No. 9 Appalachian State ^	6	–	2	8	–	4
Furman	5	–	3	6	–	5
Samford	4	–	4	6	–	5
Chattanooga	3	–	5	5	–	6
Elon	3	–	5	5	–	6
The Citadel	2	–	6	4	–	7
Western Carolina	0	–	8	1	–	10
$ – Conference champion; ^ – FCS playoff participant; Rankings from The Sports Network Poll

2011 Southland Conference football standings
	Conf.			Overall
Team	W		L	W		L
No. 2 Sam Houston State $^	7	–	0	14	–	1
No. 14 Central Arkansas ^	6	–	1	9	–	4
Stephen F. Austin	5	–	2	6	–	5
McNeese State	4	–	3	6	–	5
Northwestern State	3	–	4	5	–	6
Lamar	2	–	5	4	–	7
Southeastern Louisiana	1	–	6	3	–	8
Nicholls State	0	–	7	1	–	10
$ – Conference champion; ^ – FCS playoff participant; Rankings from The Sports Network poll

2011 Southwestern Athletic Conference football standings
	Conf.			Overall
Team	W		L	W		L
East Division
No. 21 Jackson State x	7	–	2	9	–	2
Alabama State x	7	–	2	8	–	3
Alabama A&M xy	7	–	2	8	–	4
Alcorn State	1	–	8	2	–	8
Mississippi Valley State	1	–	8	1	–	10
West Division
Grambling State xy$	6	–	3	8	–	4
Arkansas–Pine Bluff	5	–	4	6	–	5
Prairie View A&M	5	–	4	5	–	6
Southern	4	–	5	4	–	7
Texas Southern	2	–	7	4	–	7
Championship: Grambling State 16, Alabama A&M 15
$ – Conference champion; x – Division champion/co-champions; y – Championship game participant; Jackson State and Southern were ineligible to participate in the SWAC Championship Game due to low APR scores.; Rankings from The Sports Network Poll

2011 NCAA Division I FCS independents football standings
	Conf.			Overall
Team	W		L	W		L
South Alabama		–		6	–	4
Texas State		–		6	–	6
UTSA		–		4	–	6
Georgia State		–		3	–	8

== Conference summaries ==
=== Championship games ===
Conference	Champion	Runner-up	Score	Offensive Player of the Year	Defensive Player of the Year
SWAC	Grambling State	Alabama A&M	16–15	Casey Therriault (QB, Jackson State)	Adrian Hamilton (DE, Prairie View A&M); Cliff Exama (Grambling State)

=== Other conference winners ===
Note: Records are regular-season only, and do not include playoff games.

Conference	Champion	Record	Offensive Player of the Year	Defensive Player of the Year	Coach of the Year
Big Sky	Montana State	9–2 (7–1)	Bo Levi Mitchell (Eastern Washington)	Caleb McSurdy (Montana)	Robin Pflugrad (Montana)
Big South	Stony Brook	8–3 (6–0)	Miguel Maysonet (Stony Brook)	Justin Bethel (Presbyterian)	Chuck Priore (Stony Brook)
CAA	Towson	9–2 (7–1)	Kevin Decker (New Hampshire)	Ronnie Cameron (Old Dominion)	Rob Ambrose (Towson)
Great West	North Dakota; Cal Poly	8–3 (3–1); 6–5 (3–1)	Brad Sorensen (Southern Utah)	Tyler Osborne (Southern Utah)	Chris Mussman (North Dakota)
Ivy	Harvard	9–1 (7–0)	Jeff Mathews (Cornell)	Josue Ortiz (Harvard)	
MEAC	Norfolk State	9–2 (7–1)	Mike Mayhew (North Carolina A&T); Chris Walley (Norfolk State)	Ryan Davis (Bethune–Cookman)	Pete Adrian (Norfolk State)
MVFC	North Dakota State; Northern Iowa	10–1 (7–1); 9–2 (7–1)	Shakir Bell (Indiana State)	L. J. Fort (Northern Iowa)	Craig Bohl (North Dakota State)
NEC	Duquesne; Albany	9–2 (7–1); 8–3 (7–1)	Jordan Brown (Bryant)	Serge Kona (Duquesne)	Bob Ford (Albany)
OVC	Tennessee Tech; Eastern Kentucky; Jacksonville State	7–3 (6–2); 7–4 (6–2); 7–4 (6–2)	Tim Benford (Tennessee Tech)	Rico Council (Tennessee State)	Watson Brown (Tennessee Tech)
Patriot	Lehigh	10–1 (6–0)	Chris Lum (Lehigh)	Andrew Schaetzke (Georgetown)	Kevin Kelly (Georgetown)
Pioneer	San Diego; Drake	9–2 (7–1)	Mike Piatkowski (Drake)	Blake Oliaro (San Diego)	Ron Caragher (San Diego)
Southern	Georgia Southern	9–2 (7–1)	Eric Breitenstein (Wofford)	Brent Russell (Georgia Southern)	Jeff Monken (Georgia Southern)
Southland	Sam Houston State	11–0 (7–0)	Richard Sincere (Sam Houston State)	Darnell Taylor (Sam Houston State)	Willie Fritz (Sam Houston State)

== Playoff qualifiers ==
=== Automatic berths for conference champions ===
- Big Sky Conference – Montana
- Big South Conference – Stony Brook
- Colonial Athletic Association – Towson
- Missouri Valley Football Conference – North Dakota State
- Mid-Eastern Athletic Conference – Norfolk State
- Northeast Conference – Albany
- Ohio Valley Conference – Tennessee Tech
- Patriot League – Lehigh
- Southern Conference – Georgia Southern
- Southland Conference – Sam Houston State

=== At large qualifiers ===
- Big Sky Conference – Montana State
- Colonial Athletic Association – James Madison, Maine, New Hampshire, Old Dominion
- Missouri Valley Football Conference – Northern Iowa
- Ohio Valley Conference – Eastern Kentucky
- Southern Conference – Appalachian State, Wofford
- Southland Conference – Central Arkansas

No teams from the conferences that do not have automatic bids—currently the Great West Conference and Pioneer Football League—received bids.

=== Abstains ===
- Ivy League – Harvard
- Southwestern Athletic Conference – Grambling State

== Postseason ==
=== NCAA Division I playoff bracket ===
First Round
November 26
Campus sites

Second Round
December 3
Campus sites

Quarterfinals
December 9 and December 10
Campus sites

Semifinals
December 16 and December 17
Campus sites

National Championship Game

January 7
Pizza Hut Park,
Frisco, Texas

Stony Brook
27

Albany
28

1
Sam Houston State*
34

Stony Brook*
31

1
Sam Houston State*
49

Montana State
13

New Hampshire
25

Montana State*
26

1
Sam Houston State*
31

4
Montana
28

Central Arkansas
14

Central Arkansas
34

4
Montana*
41

Tennessee Tech*
14

4
Montana*
48

5
Northern Iowa
10

Wofford
21

5
Northern Iowa*
28

1
Sam Houston State
6

2
North Dakota State
17

James Madison
14

James Madison
20

2
North Dakota State*
26

Eastern Kentucky*
17

2
North Dakota State*
24

Lehigh
0

Lehigh
40

Towson*
38

2
North Dakota State*
35

3
Georgia Southern
7

Old Dominion
48

Norfolk State
18

3
Georgia Southern*
55

Old Dominion*
35

3
Georgia Southern*
35

Maine
23

Maine
34

Appalachian State*
12

* Host institution

=== SWAC Championship Game ===
Date	Location	Venue	West Div. Champion	East Div. Champion	Result
December 10	Birmingham, Alabama	Legion Field	Grambling State	Alabama A&M	GSU 16 – AAMU 15

== Conference summaries ==
=== Championship games ===
Conference	Champion	Runner-up	Score	Offensive Player of the Year	Defensive Player of the Year
SWAC	Grambling State	Alabama A&M	16–15	Casey Therriault (QB, Jackson State)	Adrian Hamilton (DE, Prairie View A&M); Cliff Exama (Grambling State)

=== Other conference winners ===
Note: Records are regular-season only, and do not include playoff games.

Conference	Champion	Record	Offensive Player of the Year	Defensive Player of the Year	Coach of the Year
Big Sky	Montana State	9–2 (7–1)	Bo Levi Mitchell (Eastern Washington)	Caleb McSurdy (Montana)	Robin Pflugrad (Montana)
Big South	Stony Brook	8–3 (6–0)	Miguel Maysonet (Stony Brook)	Justin Bethel (Presbyterian)	Chuck Priore (Stony Brook)
CAA	Towson	9–2 (7–1)	Kevin Decker (New Hampshire)	Ronnie Cameron (Old Dominion)	Rob Ambrose (Towson)
Great West	North Dakota; Cal Poly	8–3 (3–1); 6–5 (3–1)	Brad Sorensen (Southern Utah)	Tyler Osborne (Southern Utah)	Chris Mussman (North Dakota)
Ivy	Harvard	7–0 (9–1)	Jeff Mathews (Cornell)	Josue Ortiz (Harvard)	
MEAC	Norfolk State	9–2 (7–1)	Mike Mayhew (North Carolina A&T); Chris Walley (Norfolk State)	Ryan Davis (Bethune–Cookman)	Pete Adrian (Norfolk State)
MVFC	North Dakota State; Northern Iowa	10–1 (7–1); 9–2 (7–1)	Shakir Bell (Indiana State)	L. J. Fort (Northern Iowa)	Craig Bohl (North Dakota State)
NEC	Duquesne; Albany	9–2 (7–1); 8–3 (7–1)	Jordan Brown (Bryant)	Serge Kona (Duquesne)	Bob Ford (Albany)
OVC	Tennessee Tech; Eastern Kentucky; Jacksonville State	7–3 (6–2); 7–4 (6–2); 7–4 (6–2)	Tim Benford (Tennessee Tech)	Rico Council (Tennessee State)	Watson Brown (Tennessee Tech)
Patriot	Lehigh	10–1 (6–0)	Chris Lum (Lehigh)	Andrew Schaetzke (Georgetown)	Kevin Kelly (Georgetown)
Pioneer	San Diego; Drake	9–2 (7–1)	Mike Piatkowski (Drake)	Blake Oliaro (San Diego)	Ron Caragher (San Diego)
Southern	Georgia Southern	9–2 (7–1)	Eric Breitenstein (Wofford)	Brent Russell (Georgia Southern)	Jeff Monken (Georgia Southern)
Southland	Sam Houston State	11–0 (7–0)	Richard Sincere (Sam Houston State)	Darnell Taylor (Sam Houston State)	Willie Fritz (Sam Houston State)

== See also ==
- 2011 NCAA Division I FCS football rankings
