= 2011 Old Dominion Monarchs football team =

American college football season

2011 Old Dominion Monarchs football

FCS Playoffs Second Round, L 48–55 vs. Georgia Southern
- Conference: Colonial Athletic Association

Ranking
- Sports Network: No. 10
- FCS Coaches: No. 10
- Record: 10–3 (6–2 CAA)
- Head coach: Bobby Wilder (3rd season)
- Offensive coordinator: Brian Scott (3rd season)
- Offensive scheme: Hurry-up spread option
- Defensive coordinator: Andy Rondeau (3rd season)
- Base defense: 3–4
- Home stadium: Foreman Field at S. B. Ballard Stadium

2011 Colonial Athletic Association football standings
	Conf.			Overall
Team	W		L	W		L
No. 9 Towson $^	7	–	1	9	–	3
No. 10 Old Dominion ^	6	–	2	10	–	3
No. 8 Maine ^	6	–	2	9	–	4
No. 11 New Hampshire ^	6	–	2	8	–	4
No. 17 Delaware	5	–	3	7	–	4
No. 15 James Madison ^	5	–	3	8	–	5
William & Mary	3	–	5	5	–	6
Rhode Island	2	–	6	3	–	8
Villanova	1	–	7	2	–	9
Richmond	0	–	8	3	–	8
UMass *	0	–	0	5	–	6
$ – Conference champion; ^ – FCS playoff participant; * – UMass' conference record was 0–0 because they were transitioning to FBS.; Rankings from The Sports Network poll

The 2011 Old Dominion Monarchs football team represented Old Dominion University in the 2011 NCAA Division I FCS football season. The Monarchs were led by third-year head coach Bobby Wilder and played their home games at Foreman Field at S. B. Ballard Stadium. They were in their first year as a member of the Colonial Athletic Association. They finished the season 10–3, 6–2 in CAA play, to finish in a three-way tie for second place. They received an at-large bid into the FCS playoffs, their first ever playoff berth, where they defeated Norfolk State in the first round before falling to Georgia Southern in the second round.

== Schedule ==
Date	Time	Opponent	Rank	Site	TV	Result	Attendance
September 3	6:00 p.m.	Campbell*		Foreman Field; Norfolk, VA		W 41–14	19,818
September 10	12:00 p.m.	at Georgia State*		Georgia Dome; Atlanta, GA	CSN	W 40–17	11,701
September 17	6:00 p.m.	Hampton*		Foreman Field; Norfolk, VA	CSN	W 45–42	19,818
September 24	12:00 p.m.	at No. 7 Delaware		Delaware Stadium; Newark, DE	TCN	L 17–27	16,789
October 1	7:00 p.m.	No. 20 UMass		Foreman Field; Norfolk, VA	TCN	W 48–33	19,818
October 8	1:00 p.m.	at Rhode Island	No. 21	Meade Stadium; Kingston, RI		W 31–23	4,026
October 15	3:30 p.m.	No. 17 Towson^{†}	No. 18	Foreman Field; Norfolk, VA		L 35–39	19,818
October 22	3:30 p.m.	at Villanova	No. 21	Villanova Stadium; Villanova, PA		W 37–14	7,471
October 29	12:00 p.m.	No. 9 James Madison	No. 15	Foreman Field; Norfolk, VA (Oyster Bowl, rivalry)	CSN	W 23–20	19,818
November 5	2:00 p.m.	Richmond	No. 12	Foreman Field; Norfolk, VA		W 42–28	19,818
November 12	12:00 p.m.	at William & Mary	No. 11	Zable Stadium; Williamsburg, VA (Battle for the Silver Mace)	CSN	W 35–31	12,259
November 26	1:30 p.m.	No. 19 Norfolk State*	No. 10	Foreman Field; Norfolk, VA (FCS First Round)	ESPN3	W 35–18	19,818
December 3	1:00 p.m.	at No. 3 Georgia Southern*	No. 10	Paulson Stadium; Statesboro, GA (FCS Second Round)	ESPN3	L 48–55	13,226
*Non-conference game; ^{†}Homecoming; Rankings from The Sports Network FCS Poll released prior to game Poll released prior to the game; All times are in Eastern time

== Post season awards ==
- All-CAA 1st team Offense – WR Nick Mayers
- All-CAA 1st team Defense – DL Ronnie Cameron, LB Craig Wilkins, P Jonathan Plisco
- All-CAA 2nd team Defense – CB Eriq Lewis
- All-CAA 3rd team Offense – QB Taylor Heinicke, WR & PR Reid Evans, OL Jeremy Hensley, PK Jarod Brown
- All-CAA 3rd team Defense – DL Chris Burnette
- Ronnie Cameron – CAA Defensive Player of the Year, seven total All-American Awards (three first team selections, fourth second team selections), 2011 CFPA Elite Defensive tackle Award
- Jonathan Plisco – six All-American Awards
- Taylor Heinicke – National Freshman Performer of the Year
