= Dave Dunn (American football) =

American football player and coach (born 1965)

Current position
- Title: Head coach
- Team: Christopher Columbus HS (FL)

Biographical details
- Born: October 15, 1965 (age 61); Detroit, Michigan, U.S.

Playing career
- 1986–1989: San Diego
- 1991–1992: Graz Giants
- Position: Nose guard

Coaching career (HC unless noted)
- 1990: San Diego (DL)
- 1992: Indiana State (OLB)
- 1993–1996: Masuk HS (CT)
- 1997–1998: Harvard (DL)
- 1999–2000: Christopher Columbus HS (FL)
- 2001–2002: Pope John Paul II HS (FL)
- 2003–2004: Florida Atlantic (RB/ST)
- 2005: Becker
- 2006–2015: Catholic University
- 2016: Marshall (TE)
- 2017: Colby (OC/QB)
- 2019–present: Christopher Columbus HS (FL)

Head coaching record
- Overall: 42–67 (college); 56–26 (high school)
- Bowls: 1–0

Accomplishments and honors

Championships
- 1 ODAC (2008); 3 FHSAA 8A (2019, 2022–2023)

Dave Dunn (born October 15, 1965) is an American football coach and former player. He is the head football coach at Christopher Columbus High School in Westchester, Florida. Dunn served as the head football coach at Becker College in 2005 and the Catholic University of America from 2006 to 2015.

== Playing career ==
Dunn played college football at the University of San Diego and was team captain his junior and senior years, all conference and team MVP while playing defensive line. Dunn signed and played professionally in 1991-1992 for the Graz Giants in the Austrian Football League. The Giants won the Austrian Bowl league championship and were 16-4 during his the two seasons.

== Coaching career ==
Dunn began his college coaching career in 1990 at his alma mater, the University of San Diego, as defensive line coach. Afterwards, he moved to Indiana State University as outside linebackers coach. He then went to Harvard University, where he was the defensive line and strength coach. After Harvard, he moved to Florida Atlantic University as the running backs and special teams coach.

His first job as head coach came in 2005, as he signed for Becker College. The following season, 2006, he was named head coach at the Catholic University of America. In May 2016, he announced that he was stepping down from the position and moving on to Marshall University as an assistant coach.

== Head coaching record ==
=== College ===
Year	Team	Overall	Conference	Standing	Bowl/playoffs
Becker Hawks (NCAA Division III independent) (2005)
2005	Becker	0–8			
Becker:		0–8			
Catholic University Cardinals (Old Dominion Athletic Conference) (2006–2014)
2006	Catholic University	3–7	1–5	6th	
2007	Catholic University	5–5	1–5	T–6th	
2008	Catholic University	9–2	4–2	T–1st	W ECAC Southeast
2009	Catholic University	1–9	0–6	7th	
2010	Catholic University	4–6	2–4	5th	
2011	Catholic University	5–5	1–5	T–6th	
2012	Catholic University	3–7	2–5	7th	
2013	Catholic University	6–4	3–4	T–4th	
2014	Catholic University	3–7	1–6	8th	
2015	Catholic University	3–7	1–6	T–7th	
Catholic University:		42–59			
Total:		42–67			
National championship Conference title Conference division title or championship game berth
