= Mike Lichten =

American football coach

Current position
- Title: Head coach
- Team: New England (ME)
- Conference: CNE
- Record: 33–35

Coaching career (HC unless noted)
- 2008: Northeastern (DB)
- 2009: Northeastern (WR)
- 2010: Becker (DC)
- 2011–2015: Becker
- 2016–present: New England (ME)

Head coaching record
- Overall: 48–70 (college); 2–6 (club)

Accomplishments and honors

Awards
- ECFC Coach of the Year (2015)

Mike Lichten is an American college football coach. He is the head football coach for the University of New England, a position he has held since the inception of the program in 2017. New England began play in 2018. Lichten was the head football coach at Becker College in Leicester, Massachusetts from 2011 to 2015. He is a native of Newton, Massachusetts, and graduated from the University of New Hampshire in 2008.

== Head coaching record ==
=== College ===
Year	Team	Overall	Conference	Standing	Bowl/playoffs
Becker Hawks (Eastern Collegiate Football Conference) (2011–2015)
2011	Becker	1–9	1–6	7th	
2012	Becker	3–7	2–5	6th	
2013	Becker	3–7	2–5	6th	
2014	Becker	1–9	1–6	7th	
2015	Becker	7–3	5–2	T–3rd	
Becker:		15–35	11–24		
New England Nor'easters (Commonwealth Coast Football) (2018–2021)
2018	New England	2–7	1–5	T–5th	
2019	New England	4–6	2–5	T–5th	
2020–21	No team—COVID-19				
2021	New England	4–5	2–4	5th	
New England Nor'easters (Commonwealth Coast Conference / Conference of New England) (2022–present)
2022	New England	5–5	3–3	T–3rd	
2023	New England	6–4	2–3	4th	
2024	New England	4–6	2–3	T–4th	
2025	New England	8–2	5–2	3rd	
2026	New England	0–0	0–0		
New England:		33–35	17–25		
Total:		48–70			

=== Club ===
Year	Team	Overall	Conference	Standing	Bowl/playoffs
New England Nor'easters (Club team) (2017)
2017	New England	2–6			
New England:		2–6			
Total:		2–6			
