= Adrian Hamilton =

American gridiron football player (born 1987)

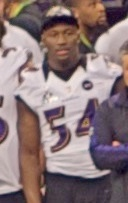
- Hamilton on the sidelines during Super Bowl XLVII

No. 54
- Position: Linebacker

Personal information
- Born: November 29, 1987 (age 38); Dallas, Texas, U.S.
- Listed height: 6 ft 3 in (1.91 m)
- Listed weight: 255 lb (116 kg)

Career information
- High school: David W. Carter (Dallas)
- College: Prairie View A&M
- NFL draft: 2012: undrafted

Career history
- Dallas Cowboys (2012)*; Baltimore Ravens (2012–2013); San Diego Chargers (2014)*; Calgary Stampeders (2015)*; Portland Thunder (2015); Ottawa RedBlacks (2015)*; Portland Steel (2016)*; Texas Revolution (2017)
- * Offseason or practice squad member only

Awards and highlights
- Super Bowl champion (XLVII); All-SWAC (2011); SWAC co-Defensive Player of the Year (2011); FCS All-American (2011); FCS Defensive Player of the Year (2011); Gator Bowl champion (2008)

Career NFL statistics
- Games played: 2
- Total tackles: 1
- Stats at Pro Football Reference

Career AFL statistics
- Total tackles: 12
- Sacks: 1.0
- Pass deflections: 4
- Stats at ArenaFan.com

Adrian Charles Hamilton (born November 29, 1987) is an American former professional football player who was a linebacker for the Baltimore Ravens of the National Football League (NFL). He played college football for the Prairie View A&M Panthers and was signed with the Dallas Cowboys as an undrafted free agent in 2012. Hamilton was also a member of the Portland Thunder in the Arena Football League (AFL).

== Early life ==
Hamilton attended David W. Carter High School, where he played both at linebacker and defensive end.

In his last 2 years, he totaled 155 tackles, 12 sacks, 29 quarterback hurries, 9 forced fumbles and one fumble returned for a touchdown.

== College career ==
Hamilton accepted a football scholarship from Oklahoma State University in 2006. As a freshman, he was suspended after failing to meet the NCAA academic requirements. The school also asked him to pay for his own tuition and "greyshirt" while sitting out the first semester, which he couldn't do.

In 2007, he walked on at Texas Tech University. As a sophomore, he played sparingly as a backup in 6 games, recording 4 tackles (one for loss). On November 17, in the season finale against No. 3 ranked Oklahoma, he tallied 2 tackles as Texas Tech won 34–27.

In August 2008, he was dismissed from the team by head coach Mike Leach for a team rules violation. In 2008, he enrolled at Dallas County Community College to improve his academic grades, although he didn't play football.

In 2010, he transferred to Football Championship Subdivision Prairie View A&M. As a junior, he was a backup defensive end behind Quinton Spears and Jarvis Wilson. He registered 27 tackles (8 for loss), 5½ sacks, eight tackles for loss and one blocked punt (returned for a touchdown).

As a senior in 2011, he started 9 out of 11 games. Hamilton broke the FCS single season sack record held by former Indianapolis Colts Robert Mathis with 22, while leading the team with 81 tackles, 26.5 tackles for loss, 5 quarterback hurries and 6 forced fumbles. On December 6, he was announced as the Southwestern Athletic Conference (SWAC) co-Defensive Player of the Year along with Grambling State linebacker Cliff Exama. He also was named to the All-SWAC defensive first-team. The Football Championship Subdivision also recognized Hamilton as Defensive Player of the Year in 2011.

== Professional career ==
=== Dallas Cowboys ===
Hamilton was signed as an undrafted free agent by the Dallas Cowboys after the 2012 NFL draft on April 29. He was limited with knee and wrist injuries during training camp. On August 25, in a preseason game against the St. Louis Rams, Hamilton had a sack on Kellen Clemens. On August 30, Hamilton was released.

=== Baltimore Ravens ===
On September 2, 2012, Hamilton signed with Baltimore Ravens to join the Practice squad. On December 22, 2012, Hamilton was promoted to the active roster after the team placed Jameel McClain on Injured Reserve. Hamilton played in the final two regular season games of the Ravens' Super Bowl XLVII championship season and made one tackle. He was declared inactive for the postseason.

On August 25, 2013, he was placed on the injured reserve list. On June 17, 2014, he was waived.

=== San Diego Chargers ===
On July 22, 2014, Hamilton signed with San Diego Chargers. The Chargers released Hamilton on August 25.

=== Calgary Stampeders (CFL) ===
On March 18, 2015, he was signed by the Calgary Stampeders of the Canadian Football League. He was released on June 14.

=== Portland Thunder (AFL) ===
On July 8, 2015, he signed with the Portland Thunder of the Arena Football League. He appeared in the last 5 games, making 12 tackles (2 for loss), 3 pass break ups, and one sack. He was placed on the Other League Exemption list, to allow him to sign a contract with the Ottawa RedBlacks of the Canadian Football League.

=== Ottawa RedBlacks (CFL) ===
On September 8, 2015, he was signed to the practice roster of the Ottawa RedBlacks in the Canadian Football League. He was released on October 18.

=== Texas Revolution (CIF) ===
In 2017, he was signed by the Texas Revolution of the Champions Indoor Football. He was released on May 31.
