= 2011 James Madison Dukes football team =

American college football season

2011 James Madison Dukes football

NCAA Division I Second Round, L 14–26 at North Dakota State
- Conference: Colonial Athletic Association
- South Division

Ranking
- Sports Network: No. 15
- FCS Coaches: No. 14
- Record: 8–5 (5–3 CAA)
- Head coach: Mickey Matthews (13th season)
- Offensive coordinator: Jeff Durden (8th season)
- Defensive coordinator: Kyle Gillenwater (3rd season)
- Home stadium: Bridgeforth Stadium

2011 Colonial Athletic Association football standings
	Conf.			Overall
Team	W		L	W		L
No. 9 Towson $^	7	–	1	9	–	3
No. 10 Old Dominion ^	6	–	2	10	–	3
No. 8 Maine ^	6	–	2	9	–	4
No. 11 New Hampshire ^	6	–	2	8	–	4
No. 17 Delaware	5	–	3	7	–	4
No. 15 James Madison ^	5	–	3	8	–	5
William & Mary	3	–	5	5	–	6
Rhode Island	2	–	6	3	–	8
Villanova	1	–	7	2	–	9
Richmond	0	–	8	3	–	8
UMass *	0	–	0	5	–	6
$ – Conference champion; ^ – FCS playoff participant; * – UMass' conference record was 0–0 because they were transitioning to FBS.; Rankings from The Sports Network poll

The 2011 James Madison Dukes football team represented James Madison University in the 2011 NCAA Division I FCS football season. The Dukes were led by 13th year head coach Mickey Matthews and played their home games at Bridgeforth Stadium. They are a member of the Colonial Athletic Association. They finished the season 8–5, 5–3 in CAA play to finish in a tie for fifth place. They received an at-large bid into the FCS playoffs where they defeated Eastern Kentucky in the first round before falling to North Dakota State in the second round.

== Schedule ==
Date	Time	Opponent	Rank	Site	TV	Result	Attendance	Source
September 3	3:30 pm	at North Carolina*	No. 15	Kenan Memorial Stadium; Chapel Hill, NC	ACCN	L 10–42	57,000	
September 10	6:00 pm	Central Connecticut*	No. 19	Bridgeforth Stadium; Harrisonburg, VA		W 14–9	25,102	
September 17	7:00 pm	at No. 22 Liberty*	No. 13	Williams Stadium; Lynchburg, VA	ESPN3	W 27–24	18,878	
September 24	7:00 pm	at No. 6 William & Mary	No. 12	Zable Stadium; Williamsburg, VA (rivalry)	CSN	W 20–14	12,259	
October 1	3:30 pm	No. 10 Richmond^{†}	No. 9	Bridgeforth Stadium; Harrisonburg, VA (rivalry)	CSN	W 31–7	25,742	
October 8	3:30 pm	No. 19 Maine	No. 7	Bridgeforth Stadium; Harrisonburg, VA	CSN	L 24–25 ^{OT}	24,023	
October 15	1:30 pm	Villanova	No. 13	Bridgeforth Stadium; Harrisonburg, VA		W 34–10	25,047	
October 29	3:30 pm	at No. 15 Old Dominion	No. 9	Foreman Field; Norfolk, VA (Oyster Bowl, rivalry)	CSN	L 20–23	19,818	
November 5	12:00 pm	at No. 9 New Hampshire	No. 13	Cowell Stadium; Durham, NH		L 10–28	4,466	
November 12	3:00 pm	Rhode Island	No. 20	Bridgeforth Stadium; Harrisonburg, VA		W 31–13	25,096	
November 19	1:00 pm	at UMass	No. 19	Warren McGuirk Alumni Stadium; Hadley, MA		W 34–17	7,103	
November 26	12:00 pm	at Eastern Kentucky*	No. 17	Roy Kidd Stadium; Richmond, KY (NCAA Division I First Round)	ESPNU	W 20–17	2,388	
December 3	4:00 pm	at No. 4 North Dakota State*	No. 17	Fargodome; Fargo, ND (NCAA Division I Second Round)	ESPN3	L 14–26	17,432	
*Non-conference game; ^{†}Homecoming; Rankings from The Sports Network Poll released prior to the game; All times are in Eastern time
