= Becker Hawks football =

College football team

- First season: 2005
- Last season: 2020
- Head coach: Frank Forcucci; 5th season, 7–33 (.175)
- Stadium: Alumni Field (capacity: 1,000)
- Location: Leicester, Massachusetts
- NCAA division: Division III
- Conference: CCC Football
- All-time record: 28–117 (.193)
- Colors: Blue
- Mascot: Hawk

The Becker Hawks football team represented Becker College in college football at the NCAA Division III level. The Hawks were members of Commonwealth Coast Football (CCC Football) from 2017 to 2020. The Hawks played their home games at Alumni Field in Leicester, Massachusetts.

Their final head coach was Frank Forcucci from 2016 to 2020.

== Conference affiliations ==
- Division III Independent (2005–2008)
- Eastern Collegiate Football Conference (2009–2016)
- Commonwealth Coast Football (2017–2020)
- indicates a former Division I FBS/I-A or University Division Conference
- indicates a former Division I FCS/I-AA conference
- indicates a former Division II/College Division conference
- indicates a former Division III conference
- indicates a former National Association of Intercollegiate Athletics (NAIA)
- + indicates a former conference, of any level, that technically still exists but under a different name
- Successor conferences in bold are still in existence:

Eastern Collegiate Football Conference (ECFC) 2009 2024 Northeast United States

North Star Athletic Association (North Star) 2013 2024 The Dakotas Dakotas Dakota DAC Dakota Athletic Conference (DAC) Frontier Conference (Frontier Conference)

== List of head coaches ==
=== Key ===
Key to symbols in coaches list
General		Overall		Conference		Postseason (Note: Although the first Rose Bowl Game was played in 1902, it has been continuously played since the 1916 game, and is recognized as the oldest bowl game by the NCAA. "—" indicates any season prior to 1916 when postseason games were not played.)	
No.	Order of coaches (Note: A running total of the number of head coaches, with coaches who served separate tenures being counted only once. Interim head coaches are represented with "Int" and are not counted in the running total. "—" indicates the team played but either without a coach or no coach is on record. "X" indicates an interim year without play.)	GC	Games coached	CW	Conference wins	PW	Postseason wins
DC	Division championships	OW	Overall wins	CL	Conference losses	PL	Postseason losses
CC	Conference championships	OL	Overall losses	CT	Conference ties	PT	Postseason ties
NC	National championships	OT	Overall ties (Note: Overtime rules in college football were introduced in 1996, making ties impossible in the period since.)	C%	Conference winning percentage		
†	Elected to the College Football Hall of Fame	O%	Overall winning percentage (Note: When computing the win–loss percentage, a tie counts as half a win and half a loss.)				

=== Coaches ===
List of head football coaches showing season(s) coached, overall records, and conference records
No.	Name	Season(s)	GC	OW	OL	O%	CW	CL	C%
1	Dave Dunn	2005	8	0	8	.000	—	—	—
2	Mel Mills	2006–2007	18	2	16	0.111	—	—	—
3	William McDonald	2008–2010	29	4	25	0.138	2	11	0.154
4	Mike Lichten	2011–2015	50	15	35	0.300	11	24	0.314
5	Frank Forcucci	2016–2020	40	7	33	0.175	4	21	0.160

== Year-by-year results ==
**National champions**	**Conference champions**	**Bowl game berth**	**Playoff berth**

Season	Year	Head coach	Association	Division	Conference	Record					Postseason	Final ranking
Season	Year	Head coach	Association	Division	Conference	Overall		Conference			Postseason	Final ranking
Season	Year	Head coach	Association	Division	Conference	Win	Loss	Finish	Win	Loss	Postseason	Final ranking
Becker Hawks
2005	2005	Dave Dunn	NCAA	Division III	Independent	0	8				—	—
2006	2006	Mel Mills	NCAA	Division III	Independent	0	9				—	—
2007	2007	Mel Mills	NCAA	Division III	Independent	2	7				—	—
2008	2008	William McDonald	NCAA	Division III	Independent	2	7				—	—
2009	2009	William McDonald	NCAA	Division III	ECFC	0	10	7th	0	6	—	—
2010	2010	William McDonald	NCAA	Division III	ECFC	2	8	6th	2	5	—	—
2011	2011	Mike Lichten	NCAA	Division III	ECFC	1	9	7th	1	6	—	—
2012	2012	Mike Lichten	NCAA	Division III	ECFC	3	7	6th	2	5	—	—
2013	2013	Mike Lichten	NCAA	Division III	ECFC	3	7	6th	2	5	—	—
2014	2014	Mike Lichten	NCAA	Division III	ECFC	1	9	7th	1	6	—	—
2015	2015	Mike Lichten	NCAA	Division III	ECFC	7	3	T–3rd	5	2	—	—
2016	2016	Frank Forcucci	NCAA	Division III	ECFC	3	7	6th	2	5	—	—
2017	2017	Frank Forcucci	NCAA	Division III	CCC Football	1	9	5th	1	4	—	—
2018	2018	Frank Forcucci	NCAA	Division III	CCC Football	1	9	T–5th	1	5	—	—
2019	2019	Frank Forcucci	NCAA	Division III	CCC Football	2	8	8th	0	7	—	—
Season canceled due to COVID-19
