= Frank Forcucci =

American baseball player and football coach

Current position
- Title: Defensive coordinator
- Team: Southern Connecticut Owls

Playing career

Baseball
- 1984–1987: New Haven
- Positions: Catcher, third baseman

Coaching career (HC unless noted)

Football
- 1994–1997: Bristol Central HS (CT) (DC)
- 1998: Bristol Central HS (CT)
- 1999: UMass (dir. ops.)
- 2000: UMass (DL)
- 2001–2003: UMass (OLB)
- 2004–2005: Central Connecticut (DC/LB)
- 2006: Fordham (DC/LB)
- 2007–2008: Fordham (DC/DB)
- 2009: Northeastern (DC/DB)
- 2010: Central Connecticut (LB)
- 2011: UMass (DC/DB)
- 2013–2015: Becker (AHC/DC)
- 2016–2020: Becker
- 2021: New Haven (LB)
- 2023–2025: Western New England (DC)
- 2026–present: Southern Connecticut (DC/DB)

Head coaching record
- Overall: 7–33 (college)

Frank Forcucci is an American college football coach and former college baseball player who is currently the defensive coordinator for Southern Connecticut. He most recently served as the defensive coordinator for Western New England University, a position he held from 2023 to 2025. Forcucci served as the head football coach at Becker College in Leicester, Massachusetts from 2016 until the school closed in 2021. He was hired in 2011 as the defensive coordinator at the University of Massachusetts Amherst.

== Head coaching record ==
=== College ===
Year	Team	Overall	Conference	Standing	Bowl/playoffs
Becker Hawks (Eastern Collegiate Football Conference) (2016)
2016	Becker	3–7	2–5	6th	
Becker Hawks (Commonwealth Coast Football) (2017–2020)
2017	Becker	1–9	1–4	5th	
2018	Becker	1–9	1–5	T–5th	
2019	Becker	2–8	0–7	8th	
2020–21	No team—COVID-19				
Becker:		7–33	4–21		
Total:		7–33			
