= 2011 NCAA Division I FCS football rankings =

Legend
	Increase in ranking
	Decrease in ranking
	Not ranked previous week
Italics	Number of first place votes
(#–#)	Win–loss record
т	Tied with team above or below also with this symbol

== The Sports Network poll ==
	Preseason Aug 15	Week 1 Sep 5	Week 2 Sep 12	Week 3 Sep 19	Week 4 Sep 26	Week 5 Oct 3	Week 6 Oct 10	Week 7 Oct 17	Week 8 Oct 24	Week 9 Oct 31	Week 10 Nov 7	Week 11 Nov 14	Week 12 Nov 21	Week 13 Nov 28	Week 14 Dec 5	Week 15 (Final) Jan 10	
1.	Eastern Washington (90)	Eastern Washington (0–1) (111)	Georgia Southern (2–0) (102)	Georgia Southern (2–0) (115)	Georgia Southern (3–0) (124)	Georgia Southern (4–0) (128)	Georgia Southern (5–0) (132)	Georgia Southern (6–0) (125)	Georgia Southern (7–0) (131)	North Dakota State (8–0) (133)	North Dakota State (9–0) (143)	Montana State (9–1) (76)				North Dakota State	1.
2.	Appalachian State (14)	Georgia Southern (1–0) (29)	Northern Iowa (1–1) (16)	Northern Iowa (1–1) (15)	Northern Iowa (2–1) (17)	Northern Iowa (3–1) (19)	Northern Iowa (4–1) (24)	Northern Iowa (5–1) (18)	Northern Iowa (6–1) (17)	Montana State (8–1) (19)	Montana State (9–1) (16)	Sam Houston State (10–0) (71)				Sam Houston State	2.
3.	William & Mary (20)	Appalachian State (0–1) (2)	Appalachian State (1–1) (10)	Appalachian State (2–1) (9)	Appalachian State (3–1) (8)	Montana State (4–1) (3)	Montana State (5–1) (2)	North Dakota State (6–0) (9)	North Dakota State (7–0) (10)	Appalachian State (6–2) (5)	Sam Houston State (9–0) (1)	Georgia Southern (9–1) (8)				Montana	3.
4.	Georgia Southern (11)	Northern Iowa (0–1) (1)	William & Mary (1–1) (5)	Montana State (2–1) (1)	Montana State (3–1) (2)	North Dakota State (4–0) (7)	North Dakota State (5–0) (6)	Montana State (6–1) (2)	Montana State (7–1) (1)	Sam Houston State (8–0) (1)	Georgia Southern (8–1)	Northern Iowa (8–2)				Georgia Southern	4.
5.	Delaware (2)	William & Mary (0–1) (1)	Montana State (1–1) (2)	Richmond (3–0) (11)	North Dakota State (3–0) (8)	Wofford (3–1)	Wofford (4–1) (2)	Wofford (5–1) (3)	Appalachian State (5–2)	Georgia Southern (7–1)	Northern Iowa (7–2)	North Dakota State (9–1) (1)				Lehigh	5.
6.	Montana State	Montana State (0–1)	Richmond (2–0) (9)	William & Mary (2–1) (1)	Delaware (3–1) (1)	New Hampshire (3–1)	New Hampshire (4–1) т	Appalachian State (4–2)	Sam Houston State (7–0)	Northern Iowa (6–2)	Lehigh (8–1)	Lehigh (9–1)				Northern Iowa	6.
7.	Northern Iowa	Wofford (1–0)	Delaware (1–1) (1)	Delaware (2–1) (1)	New Hampshire (2–1)	James Madison (4–1)	Appalachian State (3–2) т	Sam Houston State (6–0)	Lehigh (6–1)	Maine (7–1)	New Hampshire (7–2) (1)	Montana (8–2)				Montana State	7.
8.	Wofford	Delaware (0–1)	North Dakota State (2–0) (1)	North Dakota State (2–0) (1)	Wofford (2–1)	Appalachian State (3–2)	Lehigh (5–1)	Lehigh (6–1)	Maine (6–1)	Lehigh (7–1)	Montana (8–2)	Towson (8–2)				Maine	8.
9.	Jacksonville State	Richmond (1–0) (2)	Wofford (1–1)	Wofford (1–1)	James Madison (3–1)	William & Mary (3–2)	Delaware (4–2)	Maine (5–1)	James Madison (5–2)	New Hampshire (6–2)	Wofford (7–2)	Appalachian State (7–3)				Towson	9.
10.	New Hampshire (1)	Jacksonville State (1–0)	Eastern Washington (0–2) (2)	Montana (2–1)	Richmond (3–1)	Lehigh (4–1)	Sam Houston State (5–0)	Jacksonville State (5–1)	New Hampshire (5–2)	Montana (7–2)	Appalachian State (6–3)	Old Dominion (9–2)				Old Dominion	10.
11.	North Dakota State	North Dakota State (1–0)	New Hampshire (1–1)	New Hampshire (1–1)	William & Mary (2–2)	Sam Houston State (4–0)	Jacksonville State (4–1)	James Madison (5–2)	Montana (6–2)	Wofford (6–2)	Old Dominion (8–2)	Maine (8–2)				New Hampshire	11.
12.	Montana	Sacramento State (1–0) (3)	Montana (1–1)	James Madison (2–1)	Southern Illinois (2–1)	Jacksonville State (4–1)	Maine (4–1)	Montana (5–2)	Wofford (5–2)	Old Dominion (7–2)	Towson (7–2)	New Hampshire (7–3)				Appalachian State	12.
13.	Lehigh	New Hampshire (0–1)	James Madison (1–1)	Chattanooga (2–1)	Lehigh (3–1)	Delaware (3–2)	James Madison (4–2)	New Hampshire (4–2)	Towson (6–1)	James Madison (5–3)	Maine (7–2)	Wofford (7–3)				Wofford	13.
14.	Villanova (2)	Lehigh (1–0)	Chattanooga (1–1)	Southern Illinois (1–1)	Jacksonville State (3–1)	Richmond (3–2)	Montana (4–2)	William & Mary (4–3)	Jacksonville State (5–2)	Towson (6–2)	Illinois State (7–3)	Illinois State (7–3)				Central Arkansas	14.
15.	James Madison	Montana (0–1)	Southern Illinois (1–1)	Lehigh (2–1)	Chattanooga (2–2)	McNeese State (3–1)	South Dakota (4–2)	Towson (5–1)	Old Dominion (6–2)	Jackson State (7–1)	Delaware (5–4)	Delaware (6–4)				James Madison	15.
16.	Richmond	Stephen F. Austin (1–0)	Lehigh (1–1)	Jacksonville State (2–1)	Sam Houston State (3–0)	Montana (3–2)	William & Mary (3–3)	Delaware (4–3)	Alabama State (6–1)	Delaware (5–4)	Liberty (7–3)	Liberty (7–3)				Harvard	16.
17.	Stephen F. Austin	Southern Illinois (1–0)	Jacksonville State (1–1)	Massachusetts (2–0)	Southern Utah (3–1)	Indiana State (4–1)	Towson (4–1)	Indiana State (5–2)	South Dakota (5–3)	Illinois State (6–3)	Furman (6–3)	Central Arkansas (8–3)				Delaware	17.
18.	Central Arkansas	Central Arkansas (1–0)	Central Arkansas (1–1)	South Dakota (2–1)	McNeese State (2–1)	South Dakota (3–2)	Old Dominion (5–1)	Richmond (3–3)	William & Mary (4–4)	Jacksonville State (5–3)	Harvard (7–1)	Harvard (8–1)				Stony Brook	18.
19.	Southern Illinois	James Madison (0–1)	Stephen F. Austin (1–1)	McNeese State (1–1)	Montana (2–2)	Maine (3–1)	Tennessee Tech (4–1)	Alabama State (6–1)	Jackson State (6–1)	William & Mary (4–4)	Central Arkansas (7–3)	James Madison (6–4)				Norfolk State	19.
20.	McNeese State	Villanova (0–1)	Sacramento State (1–1)	Sam Houston State (2–0)	Massachusetts (2–1)	Southern Illinois (2–2)	Richmond (3–3)	North Dakota (4–2)	Indiana State (5–3)	Tennessee Tech (5–2)	James Madison (5–4)	Norfolk State (9–2)				Illinois State	20.
21.	Chattanooga	Massachusetts (1–0)	Massachusetts (1–0)	Eastern Washington (0–3)	South Dakota (2–2)	Old Dominion (4–1)	Indiana State (4–2)	Old Dominion (5–2)	Delaware (4–4)	Indiana State (5–3)	Jackson State (7–2)	Jackson State (8–2)				Tennessee Tech	21.
22.	Liberty	McNeese State (0–1)	Liberty (1–1)	Stephen F. Austin (1–2)	South Carolina State (2–2)	Southern Utah (3–2)	McNeese State (3–2)	Massachusetts (4–2)	Illinois State (5–3)	Liberty (6–3)	Norfolk State (8–2)	South Dakota (6–4)				Jackson State	22.
23.	South Carolina State	Chattanooga (0–1)	McNeese State (0–1)	Southern Utah (2–1)	Towson (3–0)	Tennessee Tech (4–1)	North Dakota (4–2)	Jackson State (6–1)	Liberty (5–3)	Harvard (6–1)	Alabama State (7–2)	Tennessee Tech (6–3)				North Dakota	23.
24.	Sacramento State	Liberty (0–1)	South Dakota (1–1)	Murray State (2–1)	Indiana State (3–1)	Chattanooga (2–3)	Alabama State (5–1)	Norfolk State (6–1)	Harvard (5–1)	South Dakota (5–4)	South Dakota (5–4)	Furman (6–4)				Eastern Kentucky	24.
25.	Massachusetts	Bethune-Cookman (1–0)	South Carolina State (1–1)	South Carolina State (1–2)	Sacramento State (2–2)	Towson (3–1)	Jackson State (5–1)	South Dakota (4–3)	Tennessee Tech (4–2)	Central Arkansas (6–3)	Eastern Kentucky (6–3)	Portland State (7–3)				Liberty	25.
	Preseason Aug 15	Week 1 Sep 5	Week 2 Sep 12	Week 3 Sep 19	Week 4 Sep 26	Week 5 Oct 3	Week 6 Oct 10	Week 7 Oct 17	Week 8 Oct 24	Week 9 Oct 31	Week 10 Nov 7	Week 11 Nov 14	Week 12 Nov 21	Week 13 Nov 28	Week 14 Dec 5	Week 15 (Final) Jan 10	
		Dropped: South Carolina State	Dropped: Chattanooga; Bethune-Cookman	Dropped: Central Arkansas; Sacramento State; Liberty	Dropped: North Dakota; Eastern Washington; Youngstown State	Dropped: Massachusetts; South Carolina State; Sacramento State	Dropped: Southern Illinois; Southern Utah; Chattanooga	Dropped: Tennessee Tech; McNeese State	Dropped: Richmond; North Dakota; Massachusetts; Norfolk State	Dropped: Alabama State	Dropped: Jacksonville State; William & Mary; Tennessee Tech; Jackson State	Dropped: Alabama State; Eastern Kentucky	None	None	None	None	

== The Coaches Poll ==
	Preseason Aug 15	Week 1 Sep 5	Week 2 Sep 12	Week 3 Sep 19	Week 4 Sep 26	Week 5 Oct 3	Week 6 Oct 10	Week 7 Oct 17	Week 8 Oct 24	Week 9 Oct 31	Week 10 Nov 7	Week 11 Nov 14	Week 12 Nov 21	Week 13 Nov 28	Week 14 Dec 5	Week 15 (Final) Jan 10	
1.	Eastern Washington (23)	Eastern Washington (0–1) (22)	Georgia Southern (2–0) (23)	Georgia Southern (2–0) (25)	Georgia Southern (3–0) (25)	Georgia Southern (4–0) (26)	Georgia Southern (5–0) (26)	Georgia Southern (6–0) (27)	Georgia Southern (7–0) (27)	North Dakota State (8–0) (22)	North Dakota State (9–0) (26)	Montana State (9–1) (18)	Sam Houston State (12–0) (17)			North Dakota State	1.
2.	Appalachian State (1)	Georgia Southern (1–0) (6)	Northern Iowa (1–1) (4)	Northern Iowa (1–1) (3)	Northern Iowa (2–1) (3)	Northern Iowa (3–1) (2)	Northern Iowa (4–1) (2)	Northern Iowa (5–1) (1)	Northern Iowa (6–1) (1)	Montana State (8–1) (2)	Montana State (9–1) (2)	Georgia Southern (9–1) (2)	Georgia Southern (10–2) (4)			Sam Houston State	2.
3.	Georgia Southern (3)	Appalachian State (0–1) т	Appalachian State (1–1)	Appalachian State (2–1)	Appalachian State (3–1)	Montana State (4–1)	Montana State (5–1)	Montana State (6–1)	North Dakota State (7–0)	Appalachian State (6–2)	Georgia Southern (8–1)	Sam Houston State (10–0) (8)	Northern Iowa (10–2)			Georgia Southern	3.
4.	William & Mary (1)	Northern Iowa (0–1) т	Montana State (1–1)	Montana State (2–1)	Montana State (3–1)	Wofford (3–1)	Wofford (4–1)	Wofford (5–1)	Montana State (7–1)	Georgia Southern (7–1) (4)	Sam Houston State (9–0)	Northern Iowa (8–2)	North Dakota State (11–1) (1)			Eastern Washington	4.
5.	Delaware	William & Mary (0–1)	William & Mary (1–1)	William & Mary (2–1)	Delaware (3–1)	North Dakota State (4–0)	North Dakota State (5–0)	North Dakota State (6–0)	Appalachian State (5–2)	Sam Houston State (8–0)	Northern Iowa (7–2)	North Dakota State (9–1)	Montana (10–2)			Montana State	5.
6.	Montana State	Montana State (0–1)	North Dakota State (2–0)	Delaware (2–1)	North Dakota State (3–0) т	James Madison (4–1)	New Hampshire (4–1)	Appalachian State (4–2)	Lehigh (6–1)	Northern Iowa (6–2)	Lehigh (8–1)	Lehigh (9–1)	Lehigh (11–1)			Old Dominion	6.
7.	Northern Iowa	Delaware (0–1)	Delaware (1–1)	Richmond (3–0)	Wofford (2–1) т	New Hampshire (3–1)	Appalachian State (3–2)	Lehigh (6–1)	Sam Houston State (7–0)	Lehigh (7–1)	Montana (8–2)	Montana (8–2)	Montana State (10–2) (1)			Wofford	7.
8.	Wofford	North Dakota State (1–0)	Wofford (1–1)	Wofford (1–1)	James Madison (3–1)	Appalachian State (3–2)	Delaware (4–2)	Jacksonville State (5–1)	Montana (6–2)	Montana (7–2)	Appalachian State (6–3)	Appalachian State (7–3)	Appalachian State (8–4)			Maine	8.
9.	Jacksonville State	Wofford (1–0)	Richmond (2–0)	Montana (2–1)	New Hampshire (2–1)	William & Mary (3–2)	Lehigh (5–1)	Montana (5–2)	Wofford (5–2)	Wofford (6–2)	Wofford (7–2)	Old Dominion (8–2)	Towson (9–3)			Towson	9.
10.	New Hampshire	Jacksonville State (1–0)	Eastern Washington (0–2) (1)	James Madison (2–1)	Richmond (3–1) т	Lehigh (4–1)	Jacksonville State (4–1)	Sam Houston State (6–0)	James Madison (5–2)	Maine (7–1)	New Hampshire (7–2)	Towson (8–2)	Old Dominion (10–3)			Old Dominion	10.
11.	North Dakota State	Richmond (1–0)	Montana (1–1)	New Hampshire (1–1)	William & Mary (2–2) т	Delaware (3–2)	Montana (4–2)	James Madison (5–2)	New Hampshire (5–2)	New Hampshire (6–2)	Old Dominion (8–2)	Maine (8–2)	Wofford (8–4)			Appalachian State	11.
12.	Montana	Stephen F. Austin (1–0)	New Hampshire (1–1)	North Dakota State (2–0)	Southern Illinois (2–1)	Jacksonville State (4–1)	Sam Houston State (5–0)	New Hampshire (4–2)	Maine (6–1)	Old Dominion (7–2)	Towson (7–2)	Wofford (7–3)	New Hampshire (8–4)			New Hampshire	12.
13.	Villanova	Montana (0–1)	Stephen F. Austin (1–1)	Southern Illinois (1–1)	Jacksonville State (3–1)	McNeese State (3–1)	James Madison (4–2)	Delaware (4–3)	Jacksonville State (5–2)	James Madison (5–3)	Maine (7–2)	New Hampshire (7–3)	Maine (9–3)			Wofford	13.
14.	Stephen F. Austin	Lehigh (1–0)	James Madison (1–1)	Chattanooga (2–1)	Lehigh (3–1)	Montana (3–2)	South Dakota (4–2)	Maine (5–1)	Towson (6–1)	Jackson State (7–1)	Harvard (7–1) т	Illinois State (7–3) т	Harvard (9–1)			James Madison	14.
15.	Lehigh	Southern Illinois (1–0)	Southern Illinois (1–1)	Jacksonville State (2–1)	McNeese State (2–1)	Sam Houston State (4–0)	William & Mary (3–3)	William & Mary (5–1)	South Dakota (5–3)	Tennessee Tech (5–2)	Liberty (7–3) т	Harvard (8–1) т	Central Arkansas (9–4)			Central Arkansas	15.
16.	James Madison	New Hampshire (0–1)	Jacksonville State (1–1)	Lehigh (2–1)	Montana (2–2)	Richmond (3–2)	Maine (4–1)	Indiana State (5–2)	Old Dominion (6–2)	Indiana State (5–3)	Illinois State (7–3)	Liberty (7–3) т	Delaware (7–4)			Stony Brook	16.
17.	Southern Illinois	James Madison (0–1)	Chattanooga (1–1)	Stephen F. Austin (1–2)	Chattanooga (2–2)	Southern Illinois (2–2)	McNeese State (3–2)	Towson (5–1)	Jackson State (6–1)	Towson (6–2)	Delaware (5–4)	Delaware (6–4)	Illinois State (7–4)			Harvard	17.
18.	Liberty	Sacramento State (1–0)	Central Arkansas (1–1)	McNeese State (1–1)	Sam Houston State (3–0)	South Dakota (3–2)	North Dakota (4–2)	North Dakota (4–2)	Indiana State (5–3)	Jacksonville State (5–3)	Jackson State (7–2)	Jackson State (8–2)	Jackson State (9–2)			Norfolk State	18.
19.	Richmond	Villanova (0–1)	Lehigh (1–1)	Massachusetts (2–0)	Southern Utah (3–1)	Indiana State (4–1)	Tennessee Tech (4–1)	South Dakota (4–3)	Tennessee Tech (4–2)	Delaware (5–4)	James Madison (5–4)	Central Arkansas (8–3)	James Madison (8–5)			Tennessee Tech	19.
20.	McNeese State	Central Arkansas (0–1)	Liberty (1–1)	South Dakota (2–1)	Massachusetts (2–1)	North Dakota (3–2)	Coastal Carolina (4–1)	Jackson State (6–1)	Delaware (4–4)	Harvard (6–1)	Tennessee Tech (5–3)	James Madison (6–4)	Tennessee Tech (7–4)			Delaware	20.
21.	South Carolina State	Liberty (0–1)	South Carolina State (1–1)	North Dakota (1–2)	South Dakota (2–2)	Tennessee Tech (4–1)	Indiana State (4–2)	Richmond (3–3)	William & Mary (4–4)	William & Mary (4–4)	Furman (6–3)	Tennessee Tech (6–3)	North Dakota (8–3)			Eastern Kentucky	21.
22.	Central Arkansas	McNeese State (0–1)	McNeese State (0–1)	Eastern Washington (0–3)	South Carolina State (2–2)	Southern Utah (3–2)	Old Dominion (5–1)	Old Dominion (5–2)	Alabama State (6–1)	Liberty (6–3)	North Dakota (6–3)	North Dakota (7–3)	Norfolk State (9–3)			Illinois State	22.
23.	Chattanooga	South Carolina State (0–1)	South Dakota (1–1)	Liberty (1–2)	Indiana State (3–1)	Chattanooga (2–3)	Towson (4–1)	Tennessee Tech (4–2)	Harvard (5–1)	South Dakota (5–4)	Indiana State (5–4)	Indiana State (6–4)	Liberty (7–4)			Albany	23.
24.	Penn	Bethune-Cookman (1–0)	Sacramento State (1–1)	Youngstown State (2–1)	North Dakota (2–2)	Coastal Carolina (3–1)	Jackson State (5–1)	McNeese State (3–3)	Liberty (5–3)	Illinois State (6–3)	South Dakota (5–4)	South Dakota (6–4)	Stony Brook (9–4)			Jackson State	24.
25.	Bethune-Cookman	Chattanooga (0–1)	Massachusetts (1–0)	South Carolina State (1–2)	Sacramento State (2–2)	Jackson State (4–1)	Richmond (3–3)	Norfolk State (6–2)	North Dakota (4–3)	North Dakota (5–3)	Central Arkansas (7–3)	Norfolk State (9–2)	San Diego (9–2)			Liberty	25.
	Preseason Aug 15	Week 1 Sep 5	Week 2 Sep 12	Week 3 Sep 19	Week 4 Sep 26	Week 5 Oct 3	Week 6 Oct 10	Week 7 Oct 17	Week 8 Oct 24	Week 9 Oct 31	Week 10 Nov 7	Week 11 Nov 14	Week 12 Nov 21	Week 13 Nov 28	Week 14 Dec 5	Week 15 (Final) Jan 10	
		Dropped: Penn	Dropped: Villanova; Bethune-Cookman	Dropped: Central Arkansas; Sacramento State	Dropped: Stephen F. Austin; Eastern Washington; Liberty; Youngstown State	Dropped: Massachusetts; South Carolina State; Sacramento State	Dropped: Southern Illinois; Southern Utah; Chattanooga	Dropped: Coastal Carolina	Dropped: Richmond; McNeese State; Norfolk State	Dropped: Alabama State	Dropped: Jacksonville State; William & Mary	Dropped: Furman	Dropped: Florida A&M; Stephen F. Austin; Jacksonville	None	None	None	

== Preseason polls ==
Various publications release their preseason top 25 months before the season commences.

	Athlon
1.	Georgia Southern
2.	William & Mary
3.	Eastern Washington
4.	Montana State
5.	Appalachian State
6.	Delaware
7.	Richmond
8.	Wofford
9.	Jacksonville State
10.	Northern Iowa
11.	North Dakota State
12.	Massachusetts
13.	New Hampshire
14.	Lehigh
15.	Sacramento State
16.	Chattanooga
17.	Villanova
18.	Southern Illinois
19.	Montana
20.	Liberty
21.	Northwestern State
22.	Eastern Kentucky
23.	Indiana State
24.	Central Arkansas
25.	Jacksonville
	Athlon
