= Bridgeforth Stadium =

American college football stadium

- The Dog House
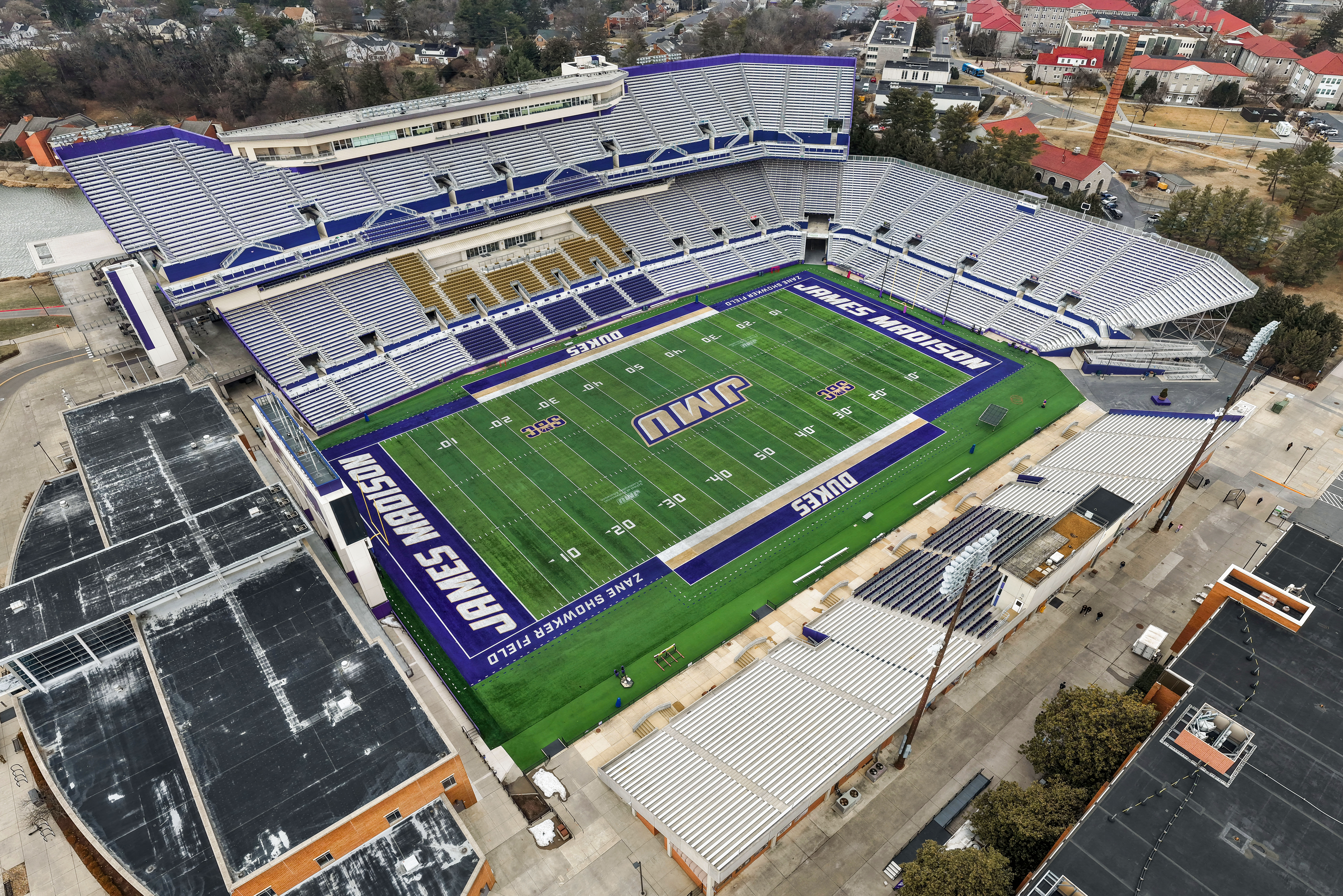
- Aerial view in 2026

- Location in the United States Location in Virginia–
- Interactive map of Bridgeforth Stadium
- Former names: JMU Stadium (1981–1989); Madison Stadium (1975–1981)
- Address: 250 Champions Drive
- Location: James Madison University; Harrisonburg, Virginia, U.S.
- Coordinates: 38°26′7″N 78°52′23″W
- Elevation: 1,300 feet (395 m) AMSL
- Owner: James Madison University
- Operator: James Madison University
- Capacity: 24,877 (2011–present); 15,694 (2010); 15,778 (2008–2009); 13,559 (2001–2007); 12,500 (1981–2000); 5,200 (1975–1980)
- Surface: FieldTurf (2006–present); Astroturf (1975–2005)
- Record attendance: 26,239 (October 28, 2023 vs. Old Dominion

Construction
- Groundbreaking: 1973
- Opened: September 20, 1975; 51 years ago
- Expanded: 1981, 2011
- Cost: $62 million (expansion)
- Architects: HKS, Inc. (Sports Design – expansion), Moseley Architects (Architect of Record – expansion)

Tenant
- James Madison Dukes football (1975–present)

Bridgeforth Stadium is a football stadium located on the campus of James Madison University in Harrisonburg, Virginia. It is home to the James Madison Dukes football team and the playing surface is named Zane Showker Field.

With a seating capacity of 24,877, Bridgeforth Stadium is currently the twelfth-largest stadium in the Sun Belt Conference. Beginning in 2027, it will be 14th (out of 15) in the American Conference.

== History ==
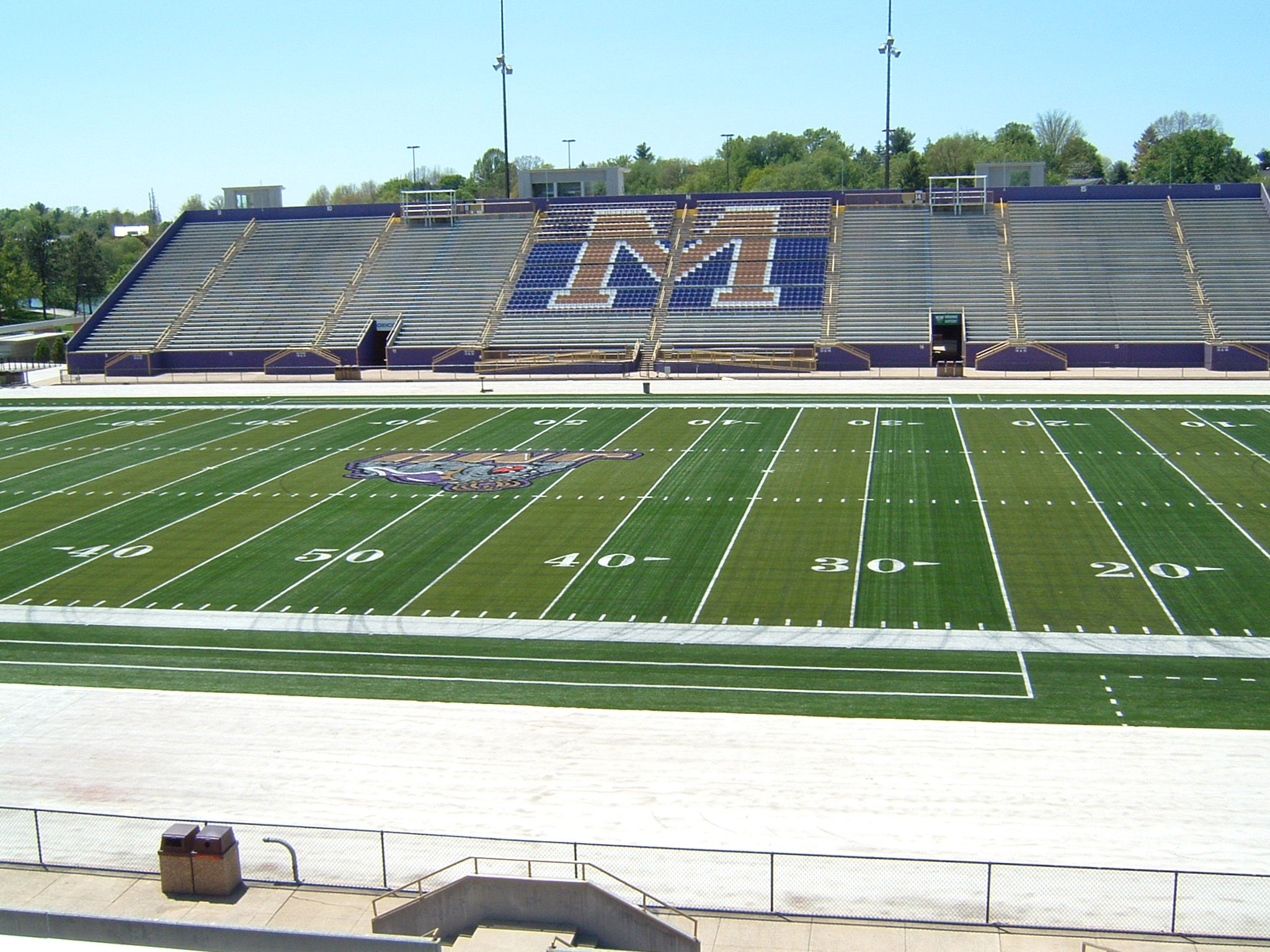
View from west grandstand in 2007, prior to renovations

Opened as Madison Stadium in 1975, the original seating capacity was approximately 5,200. Designed as a multi-purpose facility, it hosted football, track and field, lacrosse, and field hockey events. In addition, the stadium contained indoor racquetball courts, several classrooms, support space for the JMU ROTC program, and administrative offices for JMU varsity athletic teams and media relations.

In 1981, the stadium then called JMU Stadium, underwent its first expansion which included a second set of seats giving it a total capacity of more than 12,000. The stadium was again renamed in 1990 for William E. Bridgeforth, former member of the JMU Board of Visitors. In 2003 the field was named in honor of JMU benefactor Zane Showker (whose name is also on the building for JMU's School of Business). In 2004, the university added a new scoreboard with video replay features, which was dismantled after the 2010 season as part of a significant renovation of the entire facility. It was replaced by a much larger video scoreboard behind the south endzone. In 2006, the existing artificial turf was replaced with FieldTurf. The stadium is situated in the Lakeside area of campus, and is adjacent to the multimillion-dollar Plecker Athletic Center and a five-story parking deck.

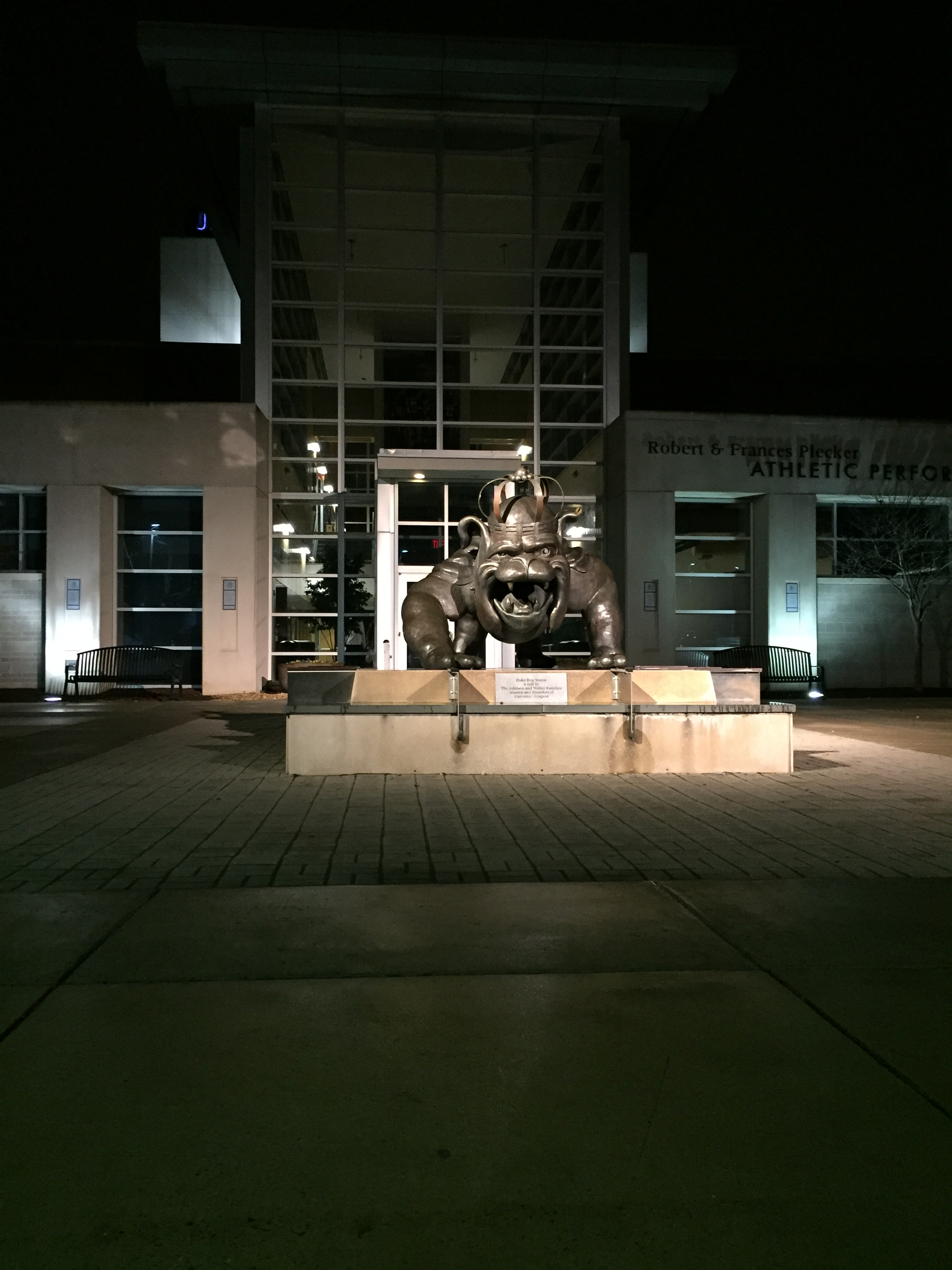
A statue of the school's mascot, Duke Dog, sits on the stadium's exterior.

== Renovation ==
A major stadium renovation and expansion project began in December 2009. The expansion included the demolition of the then existing west stands, removal of the track, and the construction of a $62 million, two-tiered complex in its place. After completion in August 2011, Bridgeforth Stadium's seating capacity was raised to 24,877 permanent seats. In addition to increased seating, the expansion included the construction of a larger video and scoreboard, the addition of 17 suites, a club lounge with chairback seating, and increased stadium lighting. All total, the completion of the Bridgeforth Stadium and Zane Showker Field complex, including the Plecker Athletic Performance Center and parking deck, represents an investment of approximately $90 million.

On September 10, 2011, the Dukes played for the first time in the newly expanded stadium. In front of a sellout crowd of 25,102 fans, the Dukes defeated the Blue Devils of Central Connecticut State University by a score of 14–9.

== Notable games ==
Some of the recent notable games in JMU history that have been played at Bridgeforth Stadium are:

- The 20–13 victory over University of Delaware in 2004
- The 2008 35–32 victory over Appalachian State
- The 38–35 victory over Wofford in the first round of the 2008 FCS playoffs
- The 31–27 victory over Villanova in the second round of the 2008 FCS playoffs
- The 2010 victory over the FCS #1 William and Mary, 30–24
- The 14–9 victory over Central Connecticut State in the 2011 debut of the newly renovated Bridgeforth Stadium
- The 27–26 double overtime victory over William & Mary, the 31–24 come back victory over William & Mary
- The 2015 59–49 loss against Richmond in front of a record 26,069 fans on the heels of a visit from ESPN's College GameDay
- The 2015 38–29 win over Villanova clinching JMUs first CAA football title since 2008.
- The record setting 84–7 win over Rhode Island in 2016.
- The 2016 55–20 win over New Hampshire in the FCS Second round
- The 2016 65–7 win over Sam Houston State in the FCS Quarterfinals
- A 30–8 win over Villanova in 2017 on the heels of a return visit from College GameDay
- A 51-16 win over South Dakota State in the 2017 FCS Semifinals to send JMU to their second consecutive FCS National Championship Game
- A 44-7 win over Middle Tennessee in 2022 in their first game as a member of the FBS subdivision of football and as a member of the Sun Belt Conference
- The 2022 26-12 loss against Marshall set a new single-game attendance record of 26,159 fans in their second home game as a member of the Sun Belt Conference
- A 30-27 win over Old Dominion on October 28, 2023 saw a new Bridgeforth Stadium attendance record as 26,239 fans saw James Madison's 11th consecutive victory
- A 26-23 OT loss to Appalachian State University in front of 25,838 fans following College GameDay's third visit to Harrisonburg and first visit after JMU's FBS transition during the 2023 season saw the team's 13-game winning streak come to an end. This loss led to the University dropping plans for a lawsuit against the NCAA over bowl eligibility.
- The 2026 Sun Belt football championship win over Troy University with a final score of 31-14.

== Largest crowds ==
| Rank | Attendance | Date | Game result |
|---|---|---|---|
| 1 | 26,239 | October 28, 2023 | #25 James Madison 30, Old Dominion 27 |
| 2 | 26,159 | October 22, 2022 | Marshall 26, James Madison 12 |
| 3 | 26,069 | October 24, 2015 | #11 Richmond 59, #4 James Madison 49 |
| 4 | 26,064 | September 30, 2023 | James Madison 31, South Alabama 23 |
| 5 | 25,993 | October 14, 2017 | #1 James Madison 30, #11 Villanova 8 |
| 6 | 25,838 | November 18, 2023 | #18 James Madison 23, Appalachian State 26 |
| 7 | 25,786 | September 28, 2024 | James Madison 63, Ball State 7 |
| 8 | 25,742 | October 1, 2011 | #9 James Madison 31, #10 Richmond 7 |
| 9 | 25,622 | October 10, 2024 | James Madison 39, Coastal Carolina 7 |
| 10 | 25,484 | October 6, 2018 | #10 Elon 27, #2 James Madison 24 |

== Panorama ==
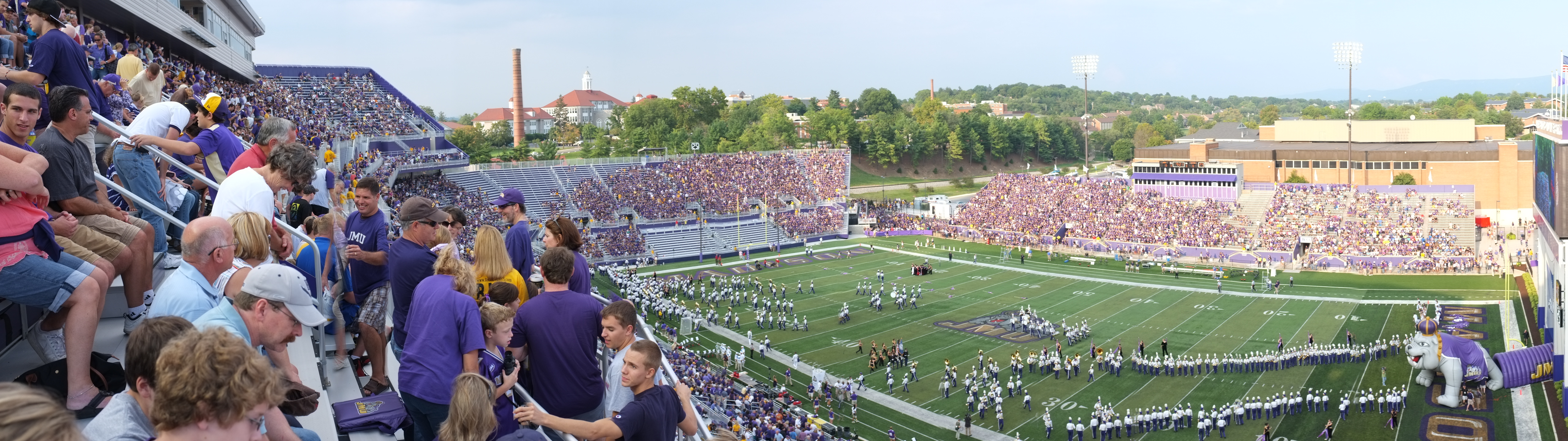
A panorama of the stadium before 2013

== See also ==
- List of NCAA Division I FBS football stadiums
