= 2011 North Dakota State Bison football team =

American college football season

2011 North Dakota State Bison football
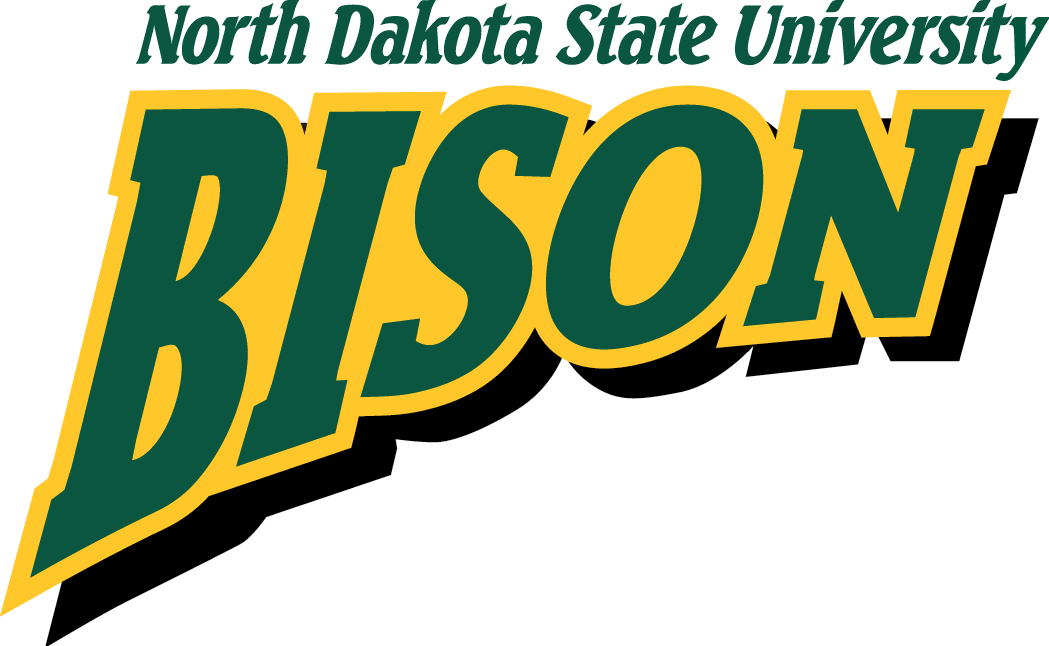

NCAA Division I champion MVFC co-champion

NCAA Division I Championship, W 17–6 vs. Sam Houston State
- Conference: Missouri Valley Football Conference

Ranking
- Sports Network: No. 1
- FCS Coaches: No. 1
- Record: 14–1 (7–1 MVFC)
- Head coach: Craig Bohl (9th season)
- Offensive coordinator: Brent Vigen (3rd season)
- Offensive scheme: Pro-style
- Defensive coordinator: Scottie Hazelton (2nd season)
- Base defense: 3–4
- Home stadium: Fargodome

2011 Missouri Valley Football Conference standings
	Conf.			Overall
Team	W		L	W		L
No. 1 North Dakota State +^	7	–	1	14	–	1
No. 6 Northern Iowa +^	7	–	1	10	–	3
No. 20 Illinois State	5	–	3	7	–	4
Indiana State	4	–	4	6	–	5
Youngstown State	4	–	4	6	–	5
South Dakota State	4	–	4	5	–	6
Southern Illinois	2	–	6	4	–	7
Missouri State	2	–	6	2	–	9
Western Illinois	1	–	7	2	–	9
+ – Conference co-champions; ^ – FCS playoff participant; Rankings from The Sports Network poll

The 2011 North Dakota State Bison football team represented North Dakota State University in the 2011 NCAA Division I FCS football season. The Bison were led by ninth year head coach Craig Bohl and played their home games at the Fargodome. They are a member of the Missouri Valley Football Conference. They finished the season 14–1, 7–1 in MVFC play to share the conference title with Northern Iowa.

The Bison received the conference's automatic bid into the FCS playoffs, their second FCS playoff bid in school history, where they advanced to the National Championship Game and defeated Sam Houston State to win their first FCS National Championship and their first national championship since 1990 when they won the Division II championship.

== Schedule ==
Date	Time	Opponent	Rank	Site	TV	Result	Attendance	Source
September 3	6:00 pm	Lafayette*	No. 11	Fargodome; Fargo, ND		W 42–6	17,023	
September 10	6:00 pm	Saint Francis (PA)*	No. 11	Fargodome; Fargo, ND	ND-NBC	W 56–3	18,341	
September 24	6:00 pm	at Minnesota*	No. 8	TCF Bank Stadium; Minneapolis, MN	BTN	W 37–24	48,802	
October 1	1:00 pm	Illinois State^{†}	No. 5	Fargodome; Fargo, ND	CSNC	W 20–10	18,904	
October 8	2:00 pm	at No. 20 Southern Illinois	No. 4	Saluki Stadium; Carbondale, IL	ESPN3	W 9–3	9,059	
October 15	6:00 pm	Missouri State	No. 4	Fargodome; Fargo, ND	MSN	W 51–21	18,029	
October 22	2:00 pm	at South Dakota State	No. 3	Coughlin–Alumni Stadium; Brookings, SD (Dakota Marker)	MSN	W 38–14	14,823	
October 29	3:00 pm	No. 2 Northern Iowa	No. 3	Fargodome; Fargo, ND	FCS Central	W 27–19	18,886	
November 5	1:00 pm	at No. 21 Indiana State	No. 1	Memorial Stadium; Terre Haute, IN	ESPN3	W 27–16	6,412	
November 12	3:00 pm	Youngstown State	No. 1	Fargodome; Fargo, ND	ND-NBC	L 24–27	18,450	
November 19	1:00 pm	at Western Illinois	No. 5	Hanson Field; Macomb, IL	KXJB-TV	W 37–21	3,560	
December 3	3:00 pm	No. 17 James Madison*	No. 4	Fargodome; Fargo, ND (FCS Second Round)	ESPN3	W 26–14	17,432	
December 10	3:00 pm	No. 6 Lehigh*	No. 4	Fargodome; Fargo, ND (FCS Quarterfinals)	ESPN3	W 24–0	18,111	
December 17	1:00 pm	No. 3 Georgia Southern*	No. 4	Fargodome; Fargo, ND (FCS Semifinals)	ESPNU	W 35–7	18,108	
January 7	12:00 pm	No. 1 Sam Houston State*	No. 4	Pizza Hut Park; Frisco, TX (FCS National Championship Game)	ESPN2	W 17–6	20,586	
*Non-conference game; ^{†}Homecoming; Rankings from The Sports Network Poll released prior to the game; All times are in Central time

== Rankings ==
Ranking movements Legend: ██ Increase in ranking ██ Decrease in ranking т = Tied with team above or below ( ) = First-place votes
	Week													
Poll	Pre	1	2	3	4	5	6	7	8	9	10	11	12	Final
Sports Network	11	11	8 (1)	8 (1)	5 (5)	4 (7)	4 (6)	3 (9)	3 (10)	1 (133)	1 (143)	5 (1)	5 (1)	1
Coaches	11	8	6	12	6 т	5	5	5	3	1 (22)	1 (26)	5	4 (1)	1

== Personnel ==
2011 North Dakota State Bison football team roster
Players
Coaches
Offense

Pos.	#	Name	Class
WR	3	Trevor Gebhart	Fr
WR	4	Ryan Smith	So
QB	5	Dante Perez	Sr
RB	8	D. J. McNorton	Sr
QB	9	Esley Thornton	Fr
QB	11	Carson Wentz	Fr
WR	12	Cooper Wahlo	So
WR	15	Dylan Dunn	Fr
QB	16	Brock Jensen	So
QB	18	Ryan Stanford	Fr
RB	22	Sam Ojuri	So
RB	23	Matt Voigtlander	Sr
FB	30	Jedre Cyr	Fr
RB	31	Amos Buehner	Jr
RB	33	Matt Jones	Fr
FB	37	Berkley Grimm	Fr
FB	39	Brennan Cable	Fr
FB	40	Andrew Grothmann	So
RB	42	Derrick Lang	So
FB	46	Andrew Bonnet	Fr
TE	47	Garrett Bruhn	Jr
TE	49	Derek Lee	Fr
G	57	Boen Andersen	Sr
OT	59	Joe Haeg	Fr
OL	61	Will Britt	Sr
G	62	Jacob Lesar	Fr
G	63	Austin Richard	Sr
OL	64	Josh Colville	Fr
G	65	Adam Schueller	Fr
G	68	Ty Beckius	Jr
G	71	Tyler Gimmestad	So
OL	72	Jeff Jerve	So
C	73	Joe Lund	Jr
OL	74	Andrew Nack	So
OT	75	Jason Pomerenke	Fr
C	76	Jesse Hinz	So
OT	77	Billy Turner	So
OT	78	Paul Cornick	Sr
WR	80	Nate Moody	Fr
WR	81	Warren Holloway	Sr
TE	82	Matt Veldman	Sr
WR	83	Brady Hansen	Sr
TE	85	Kevin Vaadeland	So
TE	86	Taylor Nelson	So
WR	87	Andrew Okland	Fr
TE	88	Luke Albers	Fr
WR	89	Zach Vraa	Fr

Defense

Pos.	#	Name	Class
CB	1	Marcus Williams	So
CB	2	Brendan Pierre	Jr
FS	7	Daniel Evans	Sr
SS	10	Bobby Ollman	Jr
CB	13	Aireal Boyd	Jr
SS	14	Brock Gion	Jr
DB	15	John Pike	Sr
SS	20	Colten Heagle	So
SS	21	Frank Veldman	Fr
CB	24	Bryan Shepherd	So
DB	26	Joey Blackmore	So
CB	27	Zach Colvin	Fr
CB	28	C. J. Smith	Fr
SS	29	A. J. Van Voorhis	So
CB	32	Jordan Champion	Fr
LB	34	Grant Olson	So
CB	35	Christian Dudzik	Fr
FS	36	Joey Sonnenfeld	Fr
LB	38	Carlton Littlejohn	Fr
S	41	Michael Wiest	Fr
LB	43	Don Carter	So
LB	44	Preston Evans	Sr
LB	45	Chad Wilson	Sr
LB	48	Logan Hushka	So
LB	49	Codee Lee	Fr
LB	51	DeShawn Dinwiddie	Fr
LB	52	Travis Beck	Fr
DE	53	Kyle Emanuel	Fr
LB	54	Tyler Gefroh	Fr
LB	55	Nick Scoliere	Fr
LB	56	Brandon Jemison	Jr
LB	58	Alex Yaggie	Sr
LB	59	Alex LaVoy	Fr
NG	60	Ryan Drevlow	So
DL	61	Brian Schaetz	Fr
DT	66	Josh Liseneby	Fr
DE	67	Leighton Talmadge	Fr
DT	69	Leevon Perry	So
DE	70	Lyle Norman	Fr
DL	90	Anthony LaVoy	So
DE	91	Mike Hardie	Fr
DE	92	Coulter Boyer	Sr
DE	93	Cole Jirik	So
DT	94	Danny Luecke	So
DT	95	Dan Wood	Fr
DE	96	Ricky Hagen	Jr
NG	97	Justin Juckem	So
DE	98	Scott Stoczynski	Sr
DT	99	Joe Horvath	Fr

Special teams

Pos.	#	Name	Class
PK	17	Adam Keller	Fr
P	19	Ben LeCompte	Fr
P	23	Matt Voigtlander	Sr
PK	30	Ryan Jastram	Sr
LS	50	Michael Murphy	So

Head coach

- Craig Bohl

Coordinators/assistant coaches

- Brent Vigen
  Offensive coordinator
  Quarterbacks
- Scottie Hazelton
  Defensive coordinator
  Linebackers
- Kenni Burns
  Wide receivers
- A. J. Cooper
  Defensive ends
- Scott Fuchs
  Offensive line
- Nick Goeser
  Defensive tackles
- Chris Klieman
  Defensive backs
- Tim Polasek
  Special teams coordinator
  Running backs
  Recruiting coordinator

Legend

- (C) Team captain
- (S) Suspended
- (I) Ineligible
- Injured
- Redshirt

Roster
Last update: January 6, 2024

== Game summaries ==
=== Lafayette ===
Lafayette Leopards at No. 11 North Dakota State Bison – Game summary

Quarter	1	2	3	4	Total
Leopards	0	0	0	6	6
No. 11 Bison	0	14	14	14	42

at Fargodome, Fargo, North Dakota

- Date: September 3
- Game time: 6:00 p.m. CDT
- Game weather: None (played indoors)
- Game attendance: 17,023
- Referee: Greg Blum
- Box score, Recap

Game information
First quarter
- No scoring plays

Second quarter

- NDSU – Warren Holloway 67-yard pass from Brock Jensen (Ryan Jastram kick), 14:49. Bison 7–0. Drive: 5 plays, 77 yards, 1:46.
- NDSU – D. J. McNorton 1-yard run (Ryan Jastram kick), 0:08. Bison 14–0. Drive: 13 plays, 74 yards, 4:51.

Third quarter

- NDSU – D. J. McNorton 21-yard run (Ryan Jastram kick), 12:25. Bison 21–0. Drive: 5 plays, 63 yards, 2:27.
- NDSU – D. J. McNorton 2-yard run (Ryan Jastram kick), 4:49. Bison 28–0. Drive: 10 plays, 44 yards, 5:49.

Fourth quarter

- LAF – Mitch Bennett 6-yard pass from Ryan O'Neil (kick failed), 14:52. Bison 28–6. Drive: 10 plays, 83 yards, 4:52.
- NDSU – Warren Holloway 57-yard pass from Brock Jensen (Ryan Jastram kick), 9:04. Bison 35–6. Drive: 2 plays, 63 yards, 0:54.
- NDSU – Derrick Lang 9-yard run (Ryan Jastram kick), 1:37. Bison 42–6. Drive: 10 plays, 63 yards, 5:01.

Statistics	LAF	NDSU
First downs	8	18
Total yards	198	416
Rushing yards	54	180
Passing yards	144	236
Turnovers	0	0
Time of possession	27:55	32:05

Team	Category	Player	Statistics
Lafayette	Passing	Ryan O'Neil	15/20, 144 yards, TD
Lafayette	Rushing	Ross Scheuerman	8 rushes, 46 yards
Lafayette	Receiving	Mitchell Bennett	3 receptions, 45 yards, TD
North Dakota State	Passing	Brock Jensen	15/22, 197 yards, 2 TD
North Dakota State	Rushing	D. J. McNorton	13 rushes, 80 yards, 3 TD
North Dakota State	Receiving	Warren Holloway	6 receptions, 147 yards, 2 TD

=== Saint Francis (PA) ===
Saint Francis Red Flash at No. 11 North Dakota State Bison – Game summary

Quarter	1	2	3	4	Total
Red Flash	0	0	0	3	3
No. 11 Bison	7	21	28	0	56

at Fargodome, Fargo, North Dakota

- Date: September 10
- Game time: 6:00 p.m. CDT
- Game weather: None (played indoors)
- Game attendance: 18,341
- Referee: Tom Stapleton
- TV: ND-NBC
- Box score, Recap

Game information
First quarter
- NDSU – Sam Ojuri 95-yard run (Ryan Jastram kick), 2:45. Bison 7–0. Drive: 2 plays, 99 yards, 0:55.

Second quarter

- NDSU – Cooper Wahlo 12-yard punt return (Ryan Jastram kick), 11:24. Bison 14–0.
- NDSU – Brock Jensen 8-yard run (Ryan Jastram kick), 7:42. Bison 21–0. Drive: 6 plays, 54 yards, 2:31.
- NDSU – Warren Holloway 22-yard pass from Brock Jensen (Ryan Jastram kick), 0:18. Bison 28–0. Drive: 7 plays, 66 yards, 2:50.

Third quarter

- NDSU – Wes Hudson 10-yard run (Ryan Jastram kick), 12:51. Bison 35–0. Drive: 4 plays, 57 yards, 2:01.
- NDSU – Matt Veldman 18-yard pass from Brock Jensen (Ryan Jastram kick), 7:44. Bison 42–0. Drive: 5 plays, 55 yards, 2:41.
- NDSU – Carlton Littlejohn 37-yard interception return (Ryan Jastram kick), 6:37. Bison 49–0.
- NDSU – Wes Hudson 1-yard run (Ryan Jastram kick), 2:17. Bison 56–0. Drive: 6 plays, 44 yards, 3:02.

Fourth quarter

- STF – Josh Thiel 26-yard field goal, 10:42. Bison 56–3. Drive: 11 plays, 71 yards, 6:29.

Statistics	STF	NDSU
First downs	15	17
Total yards	182	394
Rushing yards	66	233
Passing yards	116	161
Turnovers	3	0
Time of possession	37:31	22:29

Team	Category	Player	Statistics
Saint Francis	Passing	John Kelly	8/17, 62 yards, 2 INT
Saint Francis	Rushing	Kyle Harbridge	14 rushes, 41 yards
Saint Francis	Receiving	Ryan Laduke	5 receptions, 42 yards
North Dakota State	Passing	Brock Jensen	11/13, 139 yards, 2 TD
North Dakota State	Rushing	Sam Ojuri	12 rushes, 165 yards, TD
North Dakota State	Receiving	Warren Holloway	4 receptions, 73 yards, TD

=== At Minnesota ===
No. 8 North Dakota State Bison at Minnesota Golden Gophers – Game summary

Quarter	1	2	3	4	Total
No. 8 Bison	0	28	3	6	37
Golden Gophers	7	7	3	7	24

at TCF Bank Stadium, Minneapolis, Minnesota

- Date: September 24
- Game time: 6:00 p.m. CDT
- Game weather: Clear, 59 °F (15 °C)
- Game attendance: 48,802
- Referee: John O'Neill
- TV: BTN
- Box score, Recap

Game information
First quarter
- MINN – Donnell Kirkwood 4-yard run (Chris Hawthorne kick), 8:39. Golden Gophers 7–0. Drive: 13 plays, 68 yards, 6:21.

Second quarter

- NDSU – Brock Jensen 1-yard run (Ryan Jastram kick), 14:57. Tied 7–7. Drive: 11 plays, 65 yards, 8:42.
- NDSU – Sam Ojuri 3-yard run (Ryan Jastram kick), 7:30. Bison 14–7. Drive: 8 plays, 83 yards, 3:47.
- MINN – Donnell Kirkwood 30-yard run (Chris Hawthorne kick), 2:11. Tied 14–14. Drive: 10 plays, 95 yards, 5:19.
- NDSU – D. J. McNorton 2-yard run (Ryan Jastram kick), 0:24. Bison 21–14. Drive: 5 plays, 71 yards, 1:47.
- NDSU – Marcus Williams 52-yard interception return (Ryan Jastram kick), 0:00. Bison 28–14.

Third quarter

- NDSU – Ryan Jastram 49-yard field goal, 6:25. Bison 31–14. Drive: 12 plays, 55 yards, 8:35.
- MINN – Chris Hawthorne 36-yard field goal, 1:12. Bison 31–17. Drive: 10 plays, 53 yards, 5:13.

Fourth quarter

- MINN – Eric Lair 20-yard pass from Max Shortell (Chris Hawthorne kick), 9:05. Bison 31–24. Drive: 10 plays, 46 yards, 5:41.
- NDSU – Marcus Williams 40-yard interception return (kick failed), 2:36. Bison 37–24.

Statistics	NDSU	MINN
First downs	17	18
Total yards	336	292
Rushing yards	139	168
Passing yards	197	124
Turnovers	0	2
Time of possession	31:21	28:39

Team	Category	Player	Statistics
North Dakota State	Passing	Brock Jensen	16/21, 197 yards
North Dakota State	Rushing	D. J. McNorton	13 rushes, 92 yards, TD
North Dakota State	Receiving	Ryan Smith	4 receptions, 74 yards
Minnesota	Passing	Max Shortell	4/8, 71 yards, TD, INT
Minnesota	Rushing	Duane Bennett	13 rushes, 74 yards
Minnesota	Receiving	Eric Lair	2 receptions, 41 yards, TD

=== Illinois State ===
Illinois State Redbirds at No. 5 North Dakota State Bison – Game summary

Quarter	1	2	3	4	Total
Redbirds	0	3	0	7	10
No. 5 Bison	0	7	13	0	20

at Fargodome, Fargo, North Dakota

- Date: October 1
- Game time: 1:00 p.m. CDT
- Game weather: None (played indoors)
- Game attendance: 18,904
- Referee: Jerry Frump
- TV: CSNC
- Box score, Recap

Game information
First quarter
- No scoring plays

Second quarter

- NDSU – D. J. McNorton 36-yard pass from Brock Jensen (Ryan Jastram kick), 8:19. Bison 7–0. Drive: 6 plays, 73 yards, 2:51.
- ILST – Nick Aussieker 27-yard field goal, 2:57. Bison 7–3. Drive: 11 plays, 71 yards, 5:16.

Third quarter

- NDSU – D. J. McNorton 15-yard run (Ryan Jastram kick), 7:39. Bison 14–3. Drive: 5 plays, 45 yards, 2:08.
- NDSU – Bobby Ollman 82-yard interception return (kick blocked), 4:46. Bison 20–3.

Fourth quarter

- ILST – Milton Cobert 43-yard pass from Matt Brown (Nick Aussieker kick), 3:07. Bison 20–10. Drive: 4 plays, 41 yards, 1:27.

Statistics	ILST	NDSU
First downs	21	16
Total yards	397	331
Rushing yards	127	124
Passing yards	270	207
Turnovers	3	2
Time of possession	30:44	29:16

Team	Category	Player	Statistics
Illinois State	Passing	Matt Brown	31/48, 270 yards, TD, 2 INT
Illinois State	Rushing	Ashton Leggett	16 rushes, 73 yards
Illinois State	Receiving	Lechein Neblett	9 receptions, 78 yards
North Dakota State	Passing	Brock Jensen	15/22, 207 yards, TD
North Dakota State	Rushing	D. J. McNorton	17 rushes, 56 yards, TD
North Dakota State	Receiving	Warren Holloway	6 receptions, 70 yards

=== At No. 20 Southern Illinois ===
No. 8 North Dakota State Bison at No. 20 Southern Illinois Salukis – Game summary

Quarter	1	2	3	4	Total
No. 8 Bison	0	0	3	6	9
No. 20 Salukis	0	3	0	0	3

at Saluki Stadium, Carbondale, Illinois

- Date: October 8
- Game time: 2:00 p.m. CDT
- Game weather: Clear, 75 °F (24 °C)
- Game attendance: 9,059
- Referee: Bill Etzler
- TV: ESPN3
- Box score, Recap

Game information
First quarter
- No scoring plays

Second quarter

- SIU – Jackson MacLachlan 31-yard field goal, 3:26. Salukis 3–0. Drive: 7 plays, 53 yards, 3:09.

Third quarter

- NDSU – Ryan Jastram 36-yard field goal, 3:25. Tied 3–3. Drive: 7 plays, 71 yards, 2:21.

Fourth quarter

- NDSU – Matt Veldman 10-yard pass from Brock Jensen (kick failed), 6:51. Bison 9–3. Drive: 7 plays, 50 yards, 3:59.

Statistics	NDSU	SIU
First downs	9	17
Total yards	210	297
Rushing yards	60	128
Passing yards	150	169
Turnovers	1	3
Time of possession	28:28	31:32

Team	Category	Player	Statistics
North Dakota State	Passing	Brock Jensen	13/23, 150 yards, TD, INT
North Dakota State	Rushing	D. J. McNorton	13 rushes, 31 yards
North Dakota State	Receiving	Ryan Smith	3 receptions, 70 yards
Southern Illinois	Passing	Kory Faulkner	16/28, 169 yards, 3 INT
Southern Illinois	Rushing	Jewel Hampton	23 rushes, 120 yards
Southern Illinois	Receiving	Cam Fuller	2 receptions, 59 yards

=== Missouri State ===
Missouri State Bears at No. 4 North Dakota State Bison – Game summary

Quarter	1	2	3	4	Total
Bears	7	7	7	0	21
No. 4 Bison	10	14	17	10	51

at Fargodome, Fargo, North Dakota

- Date: October 15
- Game time: 6:00 p.m. CDT
- Game weather: None (played indoors)
- Game attendance: 18,029
- Referee: Wally Righton
- TV: MSN
- Box score, Recap

Game information
First quarter
- NDSU – Ryan Jastram 34-yard field goal, 9:47. Bison 3–0. Drive: 7 plays, 31 yards, 3:32.
- MOST – Ian Starnes 29-yard pass from Trevor Wooden (Austin Witmer kick), 5:50. Bears 7–3. Drive: 9 plays, 84 yards, 3:51.
- NDSU – Warren Holloway 31-yard pass from Brock Jensen (Ryan Jastram kick), 1:37. Bison 10–7. Drive: 8 plays, 74 yards, 4:08.

Second quarter

- MOST – Chris Douglas 19-yard pass from Trevor Wooden (Austin Witmer kick), 14:31. Bears 14–10. Drive: 7 plays, 69 yards, 2:00.
- NDSU – Warren Holloway 47-yard pass from Brock Jensen (Ryan Jastram kick), 11:06. Bison 17–14. Drive: 7 plays, 75 yards, 3:19.
- NDSU – D. J. McNorton 20-yard run (Ryan Jastram kick), 2:11. Bison 24–14. Drive: 10 plays, 96 yards, 5:31.

Third quarter

- NDSU – Marcus Williams 90-yard kickoff return (Ryan Jastram kick), 14:49. Bison 31–14.
- NDSU – Ryan Jastram 33-yard field goal, 9:08. Bison 34–14. Drive: 10 plays, 14 yards, 5:38.
- NDSU – Matt Veldman 10-yard pass from Brock Jensen (Ryan Jastram kick), 6:48. Bison 41–14. Drive: 5 plays, 28 yards, 2:09.
- MOST – Trevor Wooden 1-yard run (Austin Witmer kick), 2:22. Bison 41–21. Drive: 9 plays, 78 yards, 4:20.

Fourth quarter

- NDSU – Ryan Jastram 35-yard field goal, 12:45. Bison 44–21. Drive: 9 plays, 72 yards, 4:32.
- NDSU – D. J. McNorton 9-yard run (Ryan Jastram kick), 11:27. Bison 51–21. Drive: 1 play, 9 yards, 0:07.

Statistics	MOST	NDSU
First downs	19	26
Total yards	363	428
Rushing yards	141	212
Passing yards	222	216
Turnovers	3	0
Time of possession	22:30	37:30

Team	Category	Player	Statistics
Missouri State	Passing	Trevor Wooden	18/25, 222 yards, 2 TD
Missouri State	Rushing	Vernon Scott	13 rushes, 66 yards
Missouri State	Receiving	Ian Starnes	5 receptions, 79 yards, TD
North Dakota State	Passing	Brock Jensen	19/23, 211 yards, 3 TD
North Dakota State	Rushing	D. J. McNorton	14 rushes, 92 yards, 2 TD
North Dakota State	Receiving	Warren Holloway	6 receptions, 109 yards, 2 TD

=== At South Dakota State ===
No. 3 North Dakota State Bison at South Dakota State Jackrabbits – Game summary

Quarter	1	2	3	4	Total
No. 3 Bison	7	3	7	21	38
Jackrabbits	0	0	7	7	14

at Coughlin–Alumni Stadium, Brookings, South Dakota

- Date: October 22
- Game time: 2:00 p.m. CDT
- Game weather: Sunny, 62 °F (17 °C)
- Game attendance: 14,823
- Referee: Greg Blum
- TV: MSN
- Box score, Recap

Statistics	NDSU	SDSU
First downs		
Total yards		
Rushing yards		
Passing yards		
Turnovers		
Time of possession		

Team	Category	Player	Statistics
North Dakota State	Passing		
North Dakota State	Rushing		
North Dakota State	Receiving		
South Dakota State	Passing		
South Dakota State	Rushing		
South Dakota State	Receiving		

=== No. 2 Northern Iowa ===
No. 2 Northern Iowa Panthers at No. 3 North Dakota State Bison – Game summary

Quarter	1	2	3	4	Total
No. 2 Panthers	3	10	0	6	19
No. 3 Bison	7	10	7	3	27

at Fargodome, Fargo, North Dakota

- Date: October 29
- Game time: 3:00 p.m. CDT
- Game weather: None (played indoors)
- Game attendance: 18,886
- Referee: Bill Etzler
- TV: FCS Central
- Box score, Recap

Statistics	UNI	NDSU
First downs		
Total yards		
Rushing yards		
Passing yards		
Turnovers		
Time of possession		

Team	Category	Player	Statistics
Northern Iowa	Passing		
Northern Iowa	Rushing		
Northern Iowa	Receiving		
North Dakota State	Passing		
North Dakota State	Rushing		
North Dakota State	Receiving		

=== At No. 21 Indiana State ===
No. 1 North Dakota State Bison at No. 21 Indiana State Sycamores – Game summary

Quarter	1	2	3	4	Total
No. 1 Bison	10	7	0	10	27
No. 21 Sycamores	3	7	0	6	16

at Memorial Stadium, Terre Haute, Indiana

- Date: November 5
- Game time: 1:00 p.m. CDT/2:00 p.m. EDT
- Game weather: Sunny, 48 °F (9 °C)
- Game attendance: 6,412
- Referee: Wally Righton
- TV: ESPN3
- Box score, Recap

Statistics	NDSU	INST
First downs		
Total yards		
Rushing yards		
Passing yards		
Turnovers		
Time of possession		

Team	Category	Player	Statistics
North Dakota State	Passing		
North Dakota State	Rushing		
North Dakota State	Receiving		
Indiana State	Passing		
Indiana State	Rushing		
Indiana State	Receiving		

=== Youngstown State ===
Youngstown State at No. 1 North Dakota State Bison – Game summary

Quarter	1	2	3	4	Total
Penguins	3	14	10	0	27
No. 1 Bison	7	14	3	0	24

at Fargodome, Fargo, North Dakota

- Date: November 12
- Game time: 3:00 p.m. CST
- Game weather: None (played indoors)
- Game attendance: 18,450
- Referee: Justin Ingalls
- TV: ND-NBC
- Box score, Recap

Statistics	YSU	NDSU
First downs		
Total yards		
Rushing yards		
Passing yards		
Turnovers		
Time of possession		

Team	Category	Player	Statistics
Youngstown State	Passing		
Youngstown State	Rushing		
Youngstown State	Receiving		
North Dakota State	Passing		
North Dakota State	Rushing		
North Dakota State	Receiving		

=== At Western Illinois ===
No. 5 North Dakota State Bison at Western Illinois Leathernecks – Game summary

Quarter	1	2	3	4	Total
No. 5 Bison	7	14	16	0	37
Leathernecks	0	0	7	14	21

at Hanson Field, Macomb, Illinois

- Date: November 19
- Game time: 1:00 p.m. CST
- Game weather: Cloudy, 59 °F (15 °C)
- Game attendance: 3,560
- Referee: Tom Stapleton
- TV: KXJB-TV
- Box score, Recap

Statistics	NDSU	WIU
First downs		
Total yards		
Rushing yards		
Passing yards		
Turnovers		
Time of possession		

Team	Category	Player	Statistics
North Dakota State	Passing		
North Dakota State	Rushing		
North Dakota State	Receiving		
Western Illinois	Passing		
Western Illinois	Rushing		
Western Illinois	Receiving		

=== No. 17 James Madison (FCS Second Round) ===
No. 17 James Madison Dukes at No. 4 North Dakota State Bison (FCS Second Round) – Game summary

Quarter	1	2	3	4	Total
No. 17 Dukes	0	7	0	7	14
No. 4 Bison	0	10	6	10	26

at Fargodome, Fargo, North Dakota

- Date: December 3
- Game time: 3:00 p.m. CST
- Game weather: None (played indoors)
- Game attendance: 17,432
- Referee: Ross Smith
- TV: ESPN3
- Box score, Recap

Statistics	JMU	NDSU
First downs		
Total yards		
Rushing yards		
Passing yards		
Turnovers		
Time of possession		

Team	Category	Player	Statistics
James Madison	Passing		
James Madison	Rushing		
James Madison	Receiving		
North Dakota State	Passing		
North Dakota State	Rushing		
North Dakota State	Receiving		

=== No. 6 Lehigh (FCS Quarterfinals) ===
No. 6 Lehigh Mountain Hawks at No. 4 North Dakota State Bison (FCS Quarterfinals) – Game summary

Quarter	1	2	3	4	Total
No. 6 Mountain Hawks	0	0	0	0	0
No. 4 Bison	0	17	0	7	24

at Fargodome, Fargo, North Dakota

- Date: December 10
- Game time: 3:00 p.m. CST
- Game weather: None (played indoors)
- Game attendance: 18,111
- Referee: Kelly Hollman
- TV: ESPN3
- Box score, Recap

Statistics	LEH	NDSU
First downs		
Total yards		
Rushing yards		
Passing yards		
Turnovers		
Time of possession		

Team	Category	Player	Statistics
Lehigh	Passing		
Lehigh	Rushing		
Lehigh	Receiving		
North Dakota State	Passing		
North Dakota State	Rushing		
North Dakota State	Receiving		

=== No. 3 Georgia Southern (FCS Semifinals) ===
No. 3 Georgia Southern Eagles at No. 4 North Dakota State Bison (FCS Semifinals) – Game summary

Quarter	1	2	3	4	Total
No. 3 Eagles	0	7	0	0	7
No. 4 Bison	7	7	6	15	35

at Fargodome, Fargo, North Dakota

- Date: December 17
- Game time: 1:00 p.m. CST
- Game weather: None (played indoors)
- Game attendance: 18,108
- Referee: William Boyd
- TV: ESPNU
- Box score, Recap

Statistics	GASO	NDSU
First downs		
Total yards		
Rushing yards		
Passing yards		
Turnovers		
Time of possession		

Team	Category	Player	Statistics
Georgia Southern	Passing		
Georgia Southern	Rushing		
Georgia Southern	Receiving		
North Dakota State	Passing		
North Dakota State	Rushing		
North Dakota State	Receiving		

=== Vs. Sam Houston State (FCS Championship Game) ===
No. 1 Sam Houston State Bearkats vs. No. 4 North Dakota State Bison (FCS Championship Game) – Game summary

Quarter	1	2	3	4	Total
No. 1 Bearkats	0	6	0	0	6
No. 4 Bison	3	0	7	7	17

at Pizza Hut Park, Frisco, Texas

- Date: January 7, 2012
- Game time: 12:00 p.m. CST
- Game weather: Overcast, 50 °F (10 °C)
- Game attendance: 20,586
- Referee: Tony Marcella
- TV announcers (ESPN2): Dave Neal, David Diaz-Infante, and Allison Williams
- Box score, Recap

Game information
First quarter
- NDSU – Ryan Jastram 19-yard field goal, 0:03. Bison 3–0. Drive: 10 plays, 67 yards, 5:56.

Second quarter

- SHSU – Craig Alaniz 24-yard field goal, 2:18. Tied 3–3. Drive: 9 plays, 41 yards, 4:11.
- SHSU – Craig Alaniz 31-yard field goal, 0:40. Bearkats 6–3. Drive: 7 plays, 25 yards, 1:04.

Third quarter

- NDSU – D. J. McNorton 39-yard pass from Brock Jensen (Ryan Jastram kick), 12:47. Bison 10–6. Drive: 5 plays, 72 yards, 2:13.

Fourth quarter

- NDSU – Brock Jensen 1-yard run (Ryan Jastram kick), 8:45. Bison 17–6. Drive: 1 play, 1 yard, 0:03.

Statistics	SHSU	NDSU
First downs	12	9
Total yards	210	235
Rushing yards	95	115
Passing yards	115	120
Turnovers	2	2
Time of possession	33:05	26:55

Team	Category	Player	Statistics
Sam Houston State	Passing	Brian Bell	12/31, 115 yards, 2 INT
Sam Houston State	Rushing	Tim Flanders	21 rushes, 84 yards
Sam Houston State	Receiving	Torrance Williams	3 receptions, 53 yards
North Dakota State	Passing	Brock Jensen	10/20, 120 yards, TD, INT
North Dakota State	Rushing	D. J. McNorton	14 rushes, 39 yards
North Dakota State	Receiving	D. J. McNorton	2 receptions, 35 yards, TD
