= 2011 UT Martin Skyhawks football team =

American college football season

2011 UT Martin Skyhawks football
- Conference: Ohio Valley Conference
- Record: 5–6 (4–4 OVC)
- Head coach: Jason Simpson (6th season)
- Co-offensive coordinators: Mac Bryan (2nd season); Carmen Felus (1st season)
- Defensive coordinator: Lytrel Pollard (1st season)
- Home stadium: Graham Stadium

2011 Ohio Valley Conference football standings
	Conf.			Overall
Team	W		L	W		L
No. 21 Tennessee Tech +^	6	–	2	7	–	4
Eastern Kentucky +^	6	–	2	7	–	5
Jacksonville State +	6	–	2	7	–	4
Murray State	5	–	3	7	–	4
Tennessee State	4	–	4	5	–	6
UT Martin	4	–	4	5	–	6
Austin Peay	2	–	6	3	–	8
Southeast Missouri State	2	–	6	3	–	8
Eastern Illinois	1	–	7	2	–	9
+ – Conference co-champions; ^ – FCS playoff participant; Rankings from The Sports Network poll

The 2011 UT Martin Skyhawks football team represented the University of Tennessee at Martin as a member of the Ohio Valley Conference (OVC) during the 2011 NCAA Division I FCS football season. Led by sixth-year head coach Jason Simpson, the Skyhawks compiled an overall record of 5–6 with a mark of 4–4 in conference play, tying for fifth place in the OVC. UT Martin played home games at Graham Stadium in Martin, Tennessee.

== Schedule ==
Date	Time	Opponent	Site	TV	Result	Attendance
September 1	6:00 pm	at No. 9 Jacksonville State	JSU Stadium; Jacksonville, AL	ESPN3	L 23–24	17,919
September 15	6:00 pm	Union (KY)*	Graham Stadium; Martin, TN		W 63–0	2,431
September 22	6:00 pm	No. 24 Murray State	Graham Stadium; Martin, TN		W 48–26	5,281
October 1	6:30 pm	Tennessee Tech	Graham Stadium; Martin, TN (Sgt. York Trophy)		L 31–34	5,631
October 8	2:00 pm	Austin Peay^{†}	Graham Stadium; Martin, TN (Sgt. York Trophy)		W 61–23	6,143
October 15	4:00 pm	at South Alabama*	Ladd–Peebles Stadium; Mobile, AL	ESPN3	L 30–33	24,582
October 22	1:30 pm	at Eastern Illinois	O'Brien Field; Charleston, IL		W 24–23	6,832
October 29	6:30 pm	Southeast Missouri State	Graham Stadium; Martin, TN		W 38–30	3,349
November 5	6:30 pm	at Mississippi State*	Davis Wade Stadium; Starkville, MS	ESPN3	L 17–55	55,096
November 12	5:00 pm	at Tennessee State	LP Field; Nashville, TN (Sgt. York Trophy)		L 30–35	19,537
November 19	12:00 pm	at Eastern Kentucky	Roy Kidd Stadium; Richmond, KY		L 16–23	3,300
*Non-conference game; ^{†}Homecoming; Rankings from The Sports Network Poll released prior to the game; All times are in Central time
