= 2011 Southern Illinois Salukis football team =

American college football season

2011 Southern Illinois Salukis football
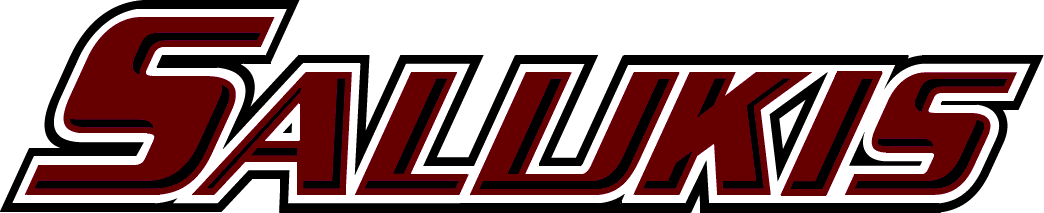
- Conference: Missouri Valley Football Conference
- Record: 4–7 (2–6 MVFC)
- Head coach: Dale Lennon (4th season)
- Offensive coordinator: Kalen DeBoer (2nd season)
- Defensive coordinator: Bubba Schweigert (4th season)
- Home stadium: Saluki Stadium

2011 Missouri Valley Football Conference standings
	Conf.			Overall
Team	W		L	W		L
No. 1 North Dakota State +^	7	–	1	14	–	1
No. 6 Northern Iowa +^	7	–	1	10	–	3
No. 20 Illinois State	5	–	3	7	–	4
Indiana State	4	–	4	6	–	5
Youngstown State	4	–	4	6	–	5
South Dakota State	4	–	4	5	–	6
Southern Illinois	2	–	6	4	–	7
Missouri State	2	–	6	2	–	9
Western Illinois	1	–	7	2	–	9
+ – Conference co-champions; ^ – FCS playoff participant; Rankings from The Sports Network poll

The 2011 Southern Illinois Salukis football team represented Southern Illinois University Carbondale as a member of the Missouri Valley Football Conference (MVFC) during the 2011 NCAA Division I FCS football season. Led by fourth-year head coach Dale Lennon, the Salukis compiled an overall record of 4–7 with a mark of 2–6 in conference play, tying for seventh place in the MVFC. Southern Illinois played home games at Saluki Stadium in Carbondale, Illinois.

== Schedule ==
Date	Time	Opponent	Rank	Site	TV	Result	Attendance	Source
September 3	6:00 pm	at Southeast Missouri State*	No. 19	Houck Stadium; Cape Girardeau, MO		W 38–10	10,136	
September 10	5:00 pm	at Ole Miss*	No. 17	Vaught–Hemingway Stadium; Oxford, MS	ESPN3	L 24–42	58,504	
September 24	6:00 pm	Missouri State	No. 14	Saluki Stadium; Carbondale, IL		W 20–18	13,271	
October 1	3:00 pm	at Western Illinois	No. 12	Hanson Field; Macomb, IL		L 21–27	14,168	
October 8	2:00 pm	No. 4 North Dakota State	No. 20	Saluki Stadium; Carbondale, IL	ESPN3	L 3–9	9,059	
October 15	2:00 pm	Youngstown State^{†}		Saluki Stadium; Carbondale, IL		L 23–35	12,796	
October 22	4:00 pm	at No. 2 Northern Iowa		UNI-Dome; Cedar Falls, IA		L 10–17	15,265	
October 29	2:00 pm	No. 22 Illinois State		Saluki Stadium; Carbondale, IL		L 30–38	8,129	
November 5	2:00 pm	at South Dakota State		Coughlin–Alumni Stadium; Brookings, SD		L 34–45	12,147	
November 12	2:00 pm	Eastern Illinois*		Saluki Stadium; Carbondale, IL		W 45–28	7,447	
November 19	1:00 pm	at Indiana State		Memorial Stadium; Terre Haute, IN		W 35–28	4,519	
*Non-conference game; ^{†}Homecoming; Rankings from The Sports Network Poll released prior to the game; All times are in Central time
