= Eric Wolford =

American football player and coach (born 1971)

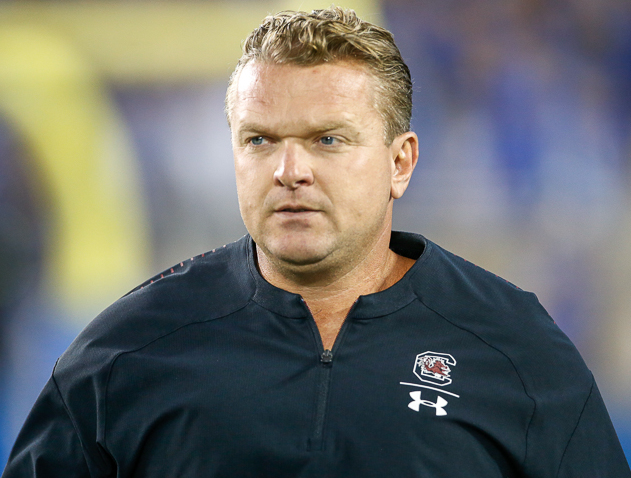
- Wolford with South Carolina in 2018

Current position
- Title: Offensive line coach
- Team: LSU
- Conference: SEC

Biographical details
- Born: April 5, 1971 (age 55); Youngstown, Ohio, U.S.
- Education: Kansas State

Playing career
- 1990–1993: Kansas State
- 1994: Arizona Cardinals
- Position: Guard

Coaching career (HC unless noted)
- 1995: Kansas State (GA)
- 1996: Emporia State (OL)
- 1997–1999: South Florida (OL)
- 2000–2002: Houston (OL)
- 2003: North Texas (OL)
- 2004–2006: Arizona (OL)
- 2007–2008: Illinois (OL)
- 2009: South Carolina (OL)
- 2010–2014: Youngstown State
- 2015–2016: San Francisco 49ers (asst. OL)
- 2017–2020: South Carolina (OL)
- 2021: Kentucky (OL)
- 2022–2023: Alabama (OL)
- 2024–2025: Kentucky (OL)
- 2026–present: LSU (OL)

Head coaching record
- Overall: 31–26

Eric Wolford is an American football coach and former player who is currently the offensive line coach at LSU. He previously served as the offensive line coach at the University of Alabama from 2022 to 2023 and the University of Kentucky in 2021 then again from 2024 to 2025. He was the head football coach at Youngstown State University from 2010 to 2014. After a 3–8 mark in his first season, the Penguins compiled a 28–18 mark over his final four campaigns, were ranked in the top-10 three times, and broke 32 school records during his tenure. Highlights included a 2012 win over 2012 Pittsburgh Panthers football team—the first win over a BCS team in school history, and a 2011 win over top-ranked North Dakota State.

== Head coaching record ==
Year	Team	Overall	Conference	Standing	Bowl/playoffs	TSN^{#}	Coaches^{°}
Youngstown State Penguins (Missouri Valley Football Conference) (2010–2014)
2010	Youngstown State	3–8	1–7	9th			
2011	Youngstown State	6–5	4–4	T–4th			
2012	Youngstown State	7–4	4–4	T–6th			
2013	Youngstown State	8–4	5–3	T–2nd		18	19
2014	Youngstown State	7–5	4–4	T–5th		22	25
Youngstown State:		31–26	18–22				
Total:		31–26					
