= 2011 Austin Peay Governors football team =

American college football season

2011 Austin Peay Governors football
- Conference: Ohio Valley Conference
- Record: 3–8 (2–6 OVC)
- Head coach: Rick Christophel (5th season)
- Defensive coordinator: Granville Eastman (7th season)
- Home stadium: Governors Stadium

2011 Ohio Valley Conference football standings
	Conf.			Overall
Team	W		L	W		L
No. 21 Tennessee Tech +^	6	–	2	7	–	4
Eastern Kentucky +^	6	–	2	7	–	5
Jacksonville State +	6	–	2	7	–	4
Murray State	5	–	3	7	–	4
Tennessee State	4	–	4	5	–	6
UT Martin	4	–	4	5	–	6
Austin Peay	2	–	6	3	–	8
Southeast Missouri State	2	–	6	3	–	8
Eastern Illinois	1	–	7	2	–	9
+ – Conference co-champions; ^ – FCS playoff participant; Rankings from The Sports Network poll

The 2011 Austin Peay Governors football team represented Austin Peay State University in the 2011 NCAA Division I FCS football season. The Governors were led by fifth-year head coach Rick Christophel and played their home games at Governors Stadium. They are a member of the Ohio Valley Conference. They finished the season 3–8, 2–6 in OVC play to finish in a tie for seventh place.

== Schedule ==
Date	Time	Opponent	Site	Result	Attendance
September 3	6:00 pm	at Cincinnati*	Nippert Stadium; Cincinnati, OH	L 10–72	23,282
September 17	6:00 pm	at Memphis*	Liberty Bowl Memorial Stadium; Memphis, TN	L 6–27	18,808
September 24	6:00 pm	Eastern Kentucky	Governors Stadium; Clarksville, TN	W 23–17	5,634
October 1	6:00 pm	Tennessee State	Governors Stadium; Clarksville, TN (Sgt. York Trophy)	W 37–34	8,614
October 8	2:00 pm	at UT Martin	Graham Stadium; Martin, TN (Sgt. York Trophy)	L 23–61	6,143
October 15	6:00 pm	No. 11 Jacksonville State	Governors Stadium; Clarksville, TN	L 14–44	5,186
October 22	1:00 pm	at Southeast Missouri State	Houck Stadium; Cape Girardeau, MO	L 13–17	6,800
October 29	4:00 pm	Eastern Illinois	Governors Stadium; Clarksville, TN	L 10–19	5,273
November 5	1:00 pm	Central State*	Governors Stadium; Clarksville, TN	W 40–0	2,627
November 12	1:00 pm	at Murray State	Roy Stewart Stadium; Murray, KY	L 24–56	3,018
November 19	1:30 pm	at No. 23 Tennessee Tech	Tucker Stadium; Cookeville, TN (Sgt. York Trophy)	L 7–49	9,142
*Non-conference game; Rankings from The Sports Network Poll released prior to the game; All times are in Central time
