= 2011 South Dakota State Jackrabbits football team =

American college football season

2011 South Dakota State Jackrabbits football
- Conference: Missouri Valley Football Conference
- Record: 5–6 (4–4 MVFC)
- Head coach: John Stiegelmeier (15th season)
- Offensive coordinator: Eric Eidsness (6th season)
- Co-defensive coordinators: Clint Brown (3rd season); Jay Bubak (3rd season)
- Home stadium: Coughlin–Alumni Stadium

2011 Missouri Valley Football Conference standings
| | Conf. | | | Overall |
| Team | W | | L | W | | L |
|---|---|---|---|---|---|---|
| No. 1 North Dakota State +^ | 7 | – | 1 | 14 | – | 1 |
| No. 6 Northern Iowa +^ | 7 | – | 1 | 10 | – | 3 |
| No. 20 Illinois State | 5 | – | 3 | 7 | – | 4 |
| Indiana State | 4 | – | 4 | 6 | – | 5 |
| Youngstown State | 4 | – | 4 | 6 | – | 5 |
| South Dakota State | 4 | – | 4 | 5 | – | 6 |
| Southern Illinois | 2 | – | 6 | 4 | – | 7 |
| Missouri State | 2 | – | 6 | 2 | – | 9 |
| Western Illinois | 1 | – | 7 | 2 | – | 9 |
+ – Conference co-champions; ^ – FCS playoff participant; Rankings from The Sports Network poll

The 2011 South Dakota State Jackrabbits football team represented South Dakota State University as a member of the Missouri Valley Football Conference (MVFC) during the 2011 NCAA Division I FCS football season. Led by 15th-year head coach John Stiegelmeier, the Jackrabbits compiled an overall record of 5–6 with a mark of 4–4 in conference play, placing in a three-way tie for fourth in the MVFC. South Dakota State played their home games at Coughlin–Alumni Stadium in Brookings, South Dakota.

== Schedule ==
| Date | Time | Opponent | Site | TV | Result | Attendance | Source |
|---|---|---|---|---|---|---|---|
| September 3 | 6:00 pm | Southern Utah* | Coughlin–Alumni Stadium; Brookings, SD | | W 29–28 | 10,113 | |
| September 10 | 11:00 am | at Illinois* | Memorial Stadium; Champaign, IL | BTN | L 3–56 | 42,212 | |
| September 17 | 6:00 pm | at Cal Poly* | Alex G. Spanos Stadium; San Luis Obispo, CA | | L 14–48 | 11,075 | |
| September 24 | 6:00 pm | at Illinois State | Hancock Stadium; Normal, IL | | L 13–20 | 7,536 | |
| October 1 | 6:00 pm | No. 24 Indiana State | Coughlin–Alumni Stadium; Brookings, SD | | L 28–38 | 12,313 | |
| October 8 | 3:00 pm | at Youngstown State | Stambaugh Stadium; Youngstown, OH | | W 35–28 | 16,209 | |
| October 15 | 6:00 pm | No. 2 Northern Iowa | Coughlin–Alumni Stadium; Brookings, SD | | L 14–31 | 11,131 | |
| October 22 | 2:00 pm | No. 3 North Dakota State | Coughlin–Alumni Stadium; Brookings, SD (Dakota Marker) | | L 14–38 | 14,823 | |
| October 29 | 2:00 pm | at Missouri State | Plaster Sports Complex; Springfield, MO | | W 43–36 ^{2OT} | 12,312 | |
| November 5 | 2:00 pm | Southern Illinois | Coughlin–Alumni Stadium; Brookings, SD | | W 45–34 | 12,147 | |
| November 12 | 1:00 pm | at Western Illinois | Hanson Field; Macomb, IL | | W 27–7 | 3,821 | |
*Non-conference game; Rankings from The Sports Network Poll released prior to the game; All times are in Central time
