= 2011 Tennessee Tech Golden Eagles football team =

American college football season

2011 Tennessee Tech Golden Eagles football

OVC co-champion

NCAA Division I First Round, L 14–34 vs. Central Arkansas
- Conference: Ohio Valley Conference

Ranking
- Sports Network: No. 21
- FCS Coaches: No. 20
- Record: 7–4 (6–2 OVC)
- Head coach: Watson Brown (5th season)
- Offensive scheme: Multiple
- Defensive coordinator: Billy Taylor (4th season)
- Base defense: Multiple 3–4
- Home stadium: Tucker Stadium

2011 Ohio Valley Conference football standings
	Conf.			Overall
Team	W		L	W		L
No. 21 Tennessee Tech +^	6	–	2	7	–	4
Eastern Kentucky +^	6	–	2	7	–	5
Jacksonville State +	6	–	2	7	–	4
Murray State	5	–	3	7	–	4
Tennessee State	4	–	4	5	–	6
UT Martin	4	–	4	5	–	6
Austin Peay	2	–	6	3	–	8
Southeast Missouri State	2	–	6	3	–	8
Eastern Illinois	1	–	7	2	–	9
+ – Conference co-champions; ^ – FCS playoff participant; Rankings from The Sports Network poll

The 2011 Tennessee Tech Golden Eagles football team represented Tennessee Technological University as a member of Ohio Valley Conference (OVC) during the 2011 NCAA Division I FCS football season. Led by fifth-year head coach Watson Brown, the Golden Eagles compiled an overall record of 7–4 overall with a mark of 6–2 in conference play, sharing the OVC title with Eastern Kentucky and Jacksonville State. Tennessee Tech received the conference's automatic bid into the NCAA Division I Football Championship playoffs, where they lost in the first round to Central Arkansas. The team played home games at Tucker Stadium in Cookeville, Tennessee.

== Schedule ==
Date	Time	Opponent	Rank	Site	TV	Result	Attendance
September 3	11:00 am	at Iowa*		Kinnick Stadium; Iowa City, IA	BTN	L 7–34	70,585
September 8	7:00 pm	Maryville*		Tucker Stadium; Cookeville, TN		W 56–7	7,232
September 17	6:30 pm	at Eastern Illinois		O'Brien Stadium; Charleston, IL		W 31–20	6,157
September 24	7:00 pm	Southeast Missouri State		Tucker Stadium; Cookeville, TN		W 38–31	8,251
October 1	6:30 pm	at UT Martin		Graham Stadium; Martin, TN (Sgt. York Trophy)		W 34–31	5,631
October 15	1:30 pm	Tennessee State	No. 19	Tucker Stadium; Cookeville, TN (Sgt. York Trophy)		L 40–42	8,676
October 29	3:00 pm	at No. 14 Jacksonville State	No. 25	JSU Stadium; Jacksonville, AL	ESPN3	W 21–14	18,933
November 5	1:30 pm	Murray State	No. 20	Tucker Stadium; Cookeville, TN	ESPN3	L 37–38	16,845
November 12	12:00 pm	at No. 25 Eastern Kentucky		Roy Kidd Stadium; Richmond, KY		W 28–21	6,100
November 19	1:30 pm	Austin Peay	No. 23	Tucker Stadium; Cookeville, TN (Sgt. York Trophy)		W 49–7	9,142
November 26	2:00 pm	No. 15 Central Arkansas	No. 21	Tucker Stadium; Cookeville, TN (NCAA Division I First Round)	ESPN3	L 14–34	6,115
*Non-conference game; Rankings from The Sports Network Poll released prior to the game; All times are in Central time
