= 2011 Northern Iowa Panthers football team =

American college football season

2011 Northern Iowa Panthers football

MVFC co-champion

NCAA Division I Quarterfinal, L 10–48 at Montana
- Conference: Missouri Valley Football Conference

Ranking
- Sports Network: No. 6
- FCS Coaches: No. 5
- Record: 10–3 (7–1 MVFC)
- Head coach: Mark Farley (11th season)
- Co-offensive coordinators: Bill Salmon (11th season); Mario Verduzco (6th season)
- Defensive coordinator: Jovan Dewitt (1st season)
- Home stadium: UNI-Dome

2011 Missouri Valley Football Conference standings
	Conf.			Overall
Team	W		L	W		L
No. 1 North Dakota State +^	7	–	1	14	–	1
No. 6 Northern Iowa +^	7	–	1	10	–	3
No. 20 Illinois State	5	–	3	7	–	4
Indiana State	4	–	4	6	–	5
Youngstown State	4	–	4	6	–	5
South Dakota State	4	–	4	5	–	6
Southern Illinois	2	–	6	4	–	7
Missouri State	2	–	6	2	–	9
Western Illinois	1	–	7	2	–	9
+ – Conference co-champions; ^ – FCS playoff participant; Rankings from The Sports Network poll

The 2011 Northern Iowa Panthers football team was an American football team that represented the University of Northern Iowa as a member of the Missouri Valley Football Conference (MVFC) during the 2011 NCAA Division I FCS football season. In its eleventh year under head coach Mark Farley, the team compiled a 10–3 record (7–1 in conference games), outscored opponents by a total of 339 to 247, and tied with North Dakota State for the MVFC championship. Northern Iowa received an at-large bid to NCAA Division I Football Championship playoffs, where, after a first-round bye, the Panthers defeated Wofford in the second round before losing to Montana in the quarterfinals.

Middle linebacker L. J. Fort and defensive tackle Ben Boothby were selected as first-team players on the Division I FCS All-American team. Boothby also received academic All-America honors. Fort set a school record with 184 total tackles, and Boothby led with 18.5 tackles for loss. Six Northern Iowa players were selected as first-team players on the 2011 all-MVFC football team: Fort; Boothby; quarterback Tirrell Rennie; offensive lineman Jay Teply; placekicker Tyler Sievertsen; and cornerback Varmah Sonie. One other, linebacker Jordan Smith, was named to the second team. Sievertsen converted 18 of 20 field goals and 39 of 39 point-after-touchdown kicks.

The team played its home games at the UNI-Dome in Cedar Falls, Iowa.

== Schedule ==
Date	Time	Opponent	Rank	Site	TV	Result	Attendance	Source
September 3	6:00 pm	at Iowa State*	No. 7	Jack Trice Stadium; Ames, IA		L 19–20	54,672	
September 10	6:00 pm	at No. 16 Stephen F. Austin*	No. 4	Homer Bryce Stadium; Nacogdoches, TX		W 34–23	8,741	
September 24	4:00 pm	Western Illinois	No. 2	UNI-Dome; Cedar Falls, IA		W 38–10	16,059	
October 1	1:00 pm	at Missouri State	No. 2	Plaster Sports Complex; Springfield, MO		W 42–7	14,827	
October 8	4:00 pm	No. 17 Indiana State^{†}	No. 2	UNI-Dome; Cedar Falls, IA		W 23–9	16,890	
October 15	6:00 pm	at South Dakota State	No. 2	Coughlin–Alumni Stadium; Brookings, SD	ESPN3	W 31–14	11,131	
October 22	4:00 pm	Southern Illinois	No. 2	UNI-Dome; Cedar Falls, IA	Panther Sports Network	W 17–10	15,265	
October 29	3:00 pm	at No. 3 North Dakota State	No. 2	Fargodome; Fargo, ND	FCS	L 19–27	18,886	
November 5	4:00 pm	Youngstown State	No. 6	UNI-Dome; Cedar Falls, IA	Panther Sports Network	W 21–17	11,523	
November 12	6:00 pm	Southern Utah*	No. 5	UNI-Dome; Cedar Falls, IA		W 34–21	12,480	
November 19	11:00 am	at No. 14 Illinois State	No. 4	Hancock Stadium; Normal, IL	ESPN3	W 23–20 ^{2OT}	6,092	
December 3	4:00 pm	No. 12 Wofford*	No. 2	UNI-Dome; Cedar Falls, IA (NCAA Division I Second Round)	ESPN3	W 28–21	6,915	
December 10	7:05 pm	at No. 5 Montana*	No. 2	Washington–Grizzly Stadium; Missoula, MT (NCAA Division I Quarterfinal)	ESPN	L 10–48	23,049	
*Non-conference game; ^{†}Homecoming; Rankings from The Sports Network Poll released prior to the game; All times are in Central time

== Rankings ==
Ranking movements Legend: ██ Increase in ranking ██ Decrease in ranking т = Tied with team above or below
	Week														
Poll	Pre	1	2	3	4	5	6	7	8	9	10	11	12	13	Final
The Sports Network	7	4	2	2	2	2	2	2	2	2	6	5	4	2	6
FCS Coaches	7	T–3	2	2	2	2	2	2	2	2	6	5	4	3	5

== Game summaries ==
=== Game 1: vs. Iowa State Cyclones ===
Game One: Northern Iowa Panthers at Iowa State Cyclones – Game summary

Quarter	1	2	3	4	Total
Panthers	3	3	7	6	19
Cyclones	0	7	0	13	20

at Jack Trice Stadium, Ames, Iowa

- Date: September 3
- Game time: 6:00 p.m. CDT
- Game weather: Temperature: 71 • Wind: W 5-10 • Weather: humid, scat. showers
- Game attendance: 54,672
- Referee: Referee: Greg Burks • Umpire: Scott Campbell • Linesman: George Gusman • Line judge: Doug Moore • Back judge: Brian Ernest • Field judge: Nick Lave • Side judge: Gene Semko • Scorer: Shuey/Pope

Game information

First quarter

- UNI - 12:09 Tyler Sievertsen 42 yd field goal (UNI 3-0)

Second quarter

- UNI - 08:55 Tyler Sievertsen 24 yd field goal (UNI 6-0)
- ISU - 00:00 Steele Jantz 1 yd run, Zach Guyer XP good (ISU 7-6)

Third quarter

- UNI - 02:30 David Johnson 1 yd run, Tyler Sievertsen XP good (UNI 13-7)

Fourth quarter

- ISU - 04:30 John Lenz 27 yd pass from Steele Jantz, Zach Guyer XP good (ISU 14-13)
- UNI - 04:17 David Johnson 80 yd pass from Tirrell Rennie, Tirrell Rennie pass failed (UNI 19-14)
- ISU - 00:40 Steele Jantz 1 yd run, Steele Jantz pass intercepted (ISU 20-19)

Top passers

- UNI – Tirrell Rennie 15/32, 181 yards, 1 TD
- ISU – Steele Jantz 18/40, 187 yards, 1 TD, 3 INT's

Top rushers

- UNI – Tirrell Rennie 18 attempts, 127 yards
- ISU – Steele Jantz 20 attempts, 80 yards

Top receivers

- UNI – David Johnson 2 receptions, 83 yards, 1 TD
- ISU – Aaron Horne 7 receptions, 69 yards

Top tacklers

- UNI – L.J. Fort 13 tackles
- ISU – Jake Knott 15 tackles

== Personnel ==
=== Coaching staff ===
Name	Position	Year at Northern Iowa	Alma mater (year)
Mark Farley	Head coach	11th	Northern Iowa (1987)
Rick Nelson	Recruiting coordinator Offensive Line	12th	Northern Iowa (1984)
Bill Salmon	Associate head coach Offensive coordinator Receivers	11th	Northern Iowa (1980)
Mario Verduzco	Co-offensive coordinator Quarterbacks	11th	San José State (1988)
Jeremiah Johnson	Recruiting coordinator/Asst. Defensive Coach	5th	Kansas (2000)
Dan Clark	Tight ends	2nd	Simpson (1995)
Jovan Dewitt	Defensive coordinator Linebackers	3rd	Northern Michigan (1999)
Matt Entz	Defensive line	2nd	Wartburg (1995)
Eric Sanders	Running backs	2nd	Northern Iowa (2008)
Blue Adams	Defensive backs	1st	Cincinnati (2003)
