= 2011 Indiana State Sycamores football team =

American college football season

2011 Indiana State Sycamores football
- Conference: Missouri Valley Football Conference
- Record: 6–5 (4–4 MVFC)
- Head coach: Trent Miles (4th season)
- Offensive coordinator: Harold Etheridge (1st season)
- Co-defensive coordinators: Shannon Jackson (4th season); Jesse Minter (1st season)
- Home stadium: Memorial Stadium

2011 Missouri Valley Football Conference standings
	Conf.			Overall
Team	W		L	W		L
No. 1 North Dakota State +^	7	–	1	14	–	1
No. 6 Northern Iowa +^	7	–	1	10	–	3
No. 20 Illinois State	5	–	3	7	–	4
Indiana State	4	–	4	6	–	5
Youngstown State	4	–	4	6	–	5
South Dakota State	4	–	4	5	–	6
Southern Illinois	2	–	6	4	–	7
Missouri State	2	–	6	2	–	9
Western Illinois	1	–	7	2	–	9
+ – Conference co-champions; ^ – FCS playoff participant; Rankings from The Sports Network poll

The 2011 Indiana State Sycamores football team represented Indiana State University as a member of the Missouri Valley Football Conference (MVFC) during the 2011 NCAA Division I FCS football season. Led by fourth-year head coach Trent Miles, the Sycamores compiled an overall record of 6–5 with a mark of 4–4 in conference play, tying for fourth place in the MVFC. Indiana State played home games at Memorial Stadium in Terre Haute, Indiana.

== Schedule ==
Date	Time	Opponent	Rank	Site	TV	Result	Attendance	Source
September 3	12:00 pm	at No. 25 (FBS) Penn State*		Beaver Stadium; University Park, PA	BTN	L 7–41	96,461	
September 10	2:00 pm	Butler*		Memorial Stadium; Terre Haute, IN		W 48–34	7,148	
September 17	7:00 pm	at Western Kentucky*		Houchens Industries–L. T. Smith Stadium; Bowling Green, KY	ESPN3	W 44–16	15,793	
September 24	2:00 pm	Youngstown State		Memorial Stadium; Terre Haute, IN		W 37–35	6,523	
October 1	7:00 pm	at South Dakota State	No. 24	Coughlin–Alumni Stadium; Brookings, SD		W 38–28	12,313	
October 8	5:00 pm	at No. 2 Northern Iowa	No. 17	UNI-Dome; Cedar Falls, IA		L 9–23	16,890	
October 15	3:00 pm	Western Illinois^{†}	No. 21	Memorial Stadium; Terre Haute, IN	WTWO	W 46–24	8,255	
October 22	2:00 pm	at Illinois State	No. 17	Hancock Stadium; Normal, IL		L 14–17	6,867	
November 5	2:00 pm	No. 1 North Dakota State	No. 21	Memorial Stadium; Terre Haute, IN		L 16–27	6,412	
November 12	2:00 pm	at Missouri State		Plaster Sports Complex; Springfield, MO		W 28–20	5,278	
November 19	2:00 pm	Southern Illinois		Memorial Stadium; Terre Haute, IN		L 28–35	4,519	
*Non-conference game; ^{†}Homecoming; Rankings from The Sports Network Poll released prior to the game; All times are in Eastern time
