= 2011 Tennessee State Tigers football team =

American college football season

2011 Tennessee State Tigers football
- Conference: Ohio Valley Conference
- Record: 5–6 (4–4 OVC)
- Head coach: Rod Reed (2nd season)
- Offensive coordinator: Mike Jones (2nd season)
- Co-defensive coordinators: Osita Alaribe (1st season); Justin Roberts (1st season)
- Home stadium: LP Field

2011 Ohio Valley Conference football standings
| | Conf. | | | Overall |
| Team | W | | L | W | | L |
|---|---|---|---|---|---|---|
| No. 21 Tennessee Tech +^ | 6 | – | 2 | 7 | – | 4 |
| Eastern Kentucky +^ | 6 | – | 2 | 7 | – | 5 |
| Jacksonville State + | 6 | – | 2 | 7 | – | 4 |
| Murray State | 5 | – | 3 | 7 | – | 4 |
| Tennessee State | 4 | – | 4 | 5 | – | 6 |
| UT Martin | 4 | – | 4 | 5 | – | 6 |
| Austin Peay | 2 | – | 6 | 3 | – | 8 |
| Southeast Missouri State | 2 | – | 6 | 3 | – | 8 |
| Eastern Illinois | 1 | – | 7 | 2 | – | 9 |
+ – Conference co-champions; ^ – FCS playoff participant; Rankings from The Sports Network poll

The 2011 Tennessee State Tigers football team represented Tennessee State University as a member of the a member of the Ohio Valley Conference (OVC) in the 2011 NCAA Division I FCS football season. The Tigers were led by second-year head coach Rod Reed and played their home games at LP Field. They finished the season 5–6 overall and 4–4 in OVC play to tie for fifth place.

== Schedule ==
| Date | Time | Opponent | Site | TV | Result | Attendance |
|---|---|---|---|---|---|---|
| September 3 | 6:00 pm | Southern* | LP Field; Nashville, TN | | W 33–7 | 25,209 |
| September 10 | 6:00 pm | vs. Jackson State* | Liberty Bowl Memorial Stadium; Memphis, TN (Southern Heritage Classic) | | L 29–35 | 43,532 |
| September 17 | 6:00 pm | at Murray State | Roy Stewart Stadium; Murray, KY | | L 27–58 | 10,031 |
| September 24 | 2:00 pm | at Air Force* | Falcon Stadium; Colorado Springs, CO | The Mtn. | L 24–63 | 33,487 |
| October 1 | 6:00 pm | at Austin Peay | Governors Stadium; Clarksville, TN (Sgt. York Trophy) | | L 34–37 | 8,614 |
| October 8 | 6:00 pm | Southeast Missouri State | LP Field; Nashville, TN | | W 55–3 | 6,234 |
| October 15 | 1:30 pm | at No. 19 Tennessee Tech | Tucker Stadium; Cookeville, TN | | W 42–40 | 8,676 |
| October 22 | 2:00 pm | at Eastern Kentucky | Roy Kidd Stadium; Richmond, KY | | L 22–33 | 10,800 |
| November 5 | 1:30 pm | at Eastern Illinois | O'Brien Field; Charleston, IL | | W 18–17 | 6,774 |
| November 12 | 5:00 pm | UT Martin^{†} | LP Field; Nashville, TN | | W 35–30 | 19,537 |
| November 19 | 2:00 pm | Jacksonville State | LP Field; Nashville, TN | | L 16–38 | 6,137 |
*Non-conference game; ^{†}Homecoming; Rankings from The Sports Network Poll released prior to the game; All times are in Central time
