= 2011 Missouri State Bears football team =

American college football season

2011 Missouri State Bears football
- Conference: Missouri Valley Football Conference
- Record: 2–9 (2–6 MVFC)
- Head coach: Terry Allen (6th season)
- Offensive coordinator: Rob Christophel (6th season)
- Offensive scheme: Spread
- Defensive coordinator: D. J. Vokolek (6th season)
- Base defense: 3–4
- Captains: Chris Douglas; David Ingram; Stephen Johnston; Mikel Ruder; Travis Simmons
- Home stadium: Plaster Sports Complex

2011 Missouri Valley Football Conference standings
	Conf.			Overall
Team	W		L	W		L
No. 1 North Dakota State +^	7	–	1	14	–	1
No. 6 Northern Iowa +^	7	–	1	10	–	3
No. 20 Illinois State	5	–	3	7	–	4
Indiana State	4	–	4	6	–	5
Youngstown State	4	–	4	6	–	5
South Dakota State	4	–	4	5	–	6
Southern Illinois	2	–	6	4	–	7
Missouri State	2	–	6	2	–	9
Western Illinois	1	–	7	2	–	9
+ – Conference co-champions; ^ – FCS playoff participant; Rankings from The Sports Network poll

The 2011 Missouri State Bears football team represented Missouri State University as a member of the Missouri Valley Football Conference (MVFC) during the 2011 NCAA Division I FCS football season. Led by sixth-year head coach Terry Allen, the Bears compiled an overall record of 2–9 with a mark of 2–6 in conference play, tying for seventh place in the MVFC. Missouri State played home games at Plaster Sports Complex in Springfield, Missouri.

== Schedule ==
Date	Time	Opponent	Site	TV	Result	Attendance	Source
September 3	6:00 pm	at No. 14 (FBS) Arkansas*	Donald W. Reynolds Razorback Stadium; Fayetteville, AR		L 7–51	70,607	
September 10	5:00 pm	at Eastern Kentucky*	Roy Kidd Stadium; Richmond, KY		L 24–28	9,200	
September 17	2:30 pm	at No. 12 (FBS) Oregon*	Autzen Stadium; Eugene, OR	CSNNW/OSN	L 7–56	58,847	
September 24	6:00 pm	at No. 14 Southern Illinois	Saluki Stadium; Carbondale, IL		L 18–20	13,271	
October 1	1:00 pm	No. 2 Northern Iowa	Plaster Sports Complex; Springfield, MO		L 7–42	14,168	
October 8	2:00 pm	Illinois State	Plaster Sports Complex; Springfield, MO		L 13–38	10,800	
October 15	6:00 pm	at No. 4 North Dakota State	Fargodome; Fargo, ND		L 21–51	18,029	
October 22	6:00 pm	at Western Illinois	Hanson Field; Macomb, IL		W 31–17	10,041	
October 29	2:00 pm	South Dakota State^{†}	Plaster Sports Complex; Springfield, MO		L 36–43 ^{2OT}	12,312	
November 12	1:00 pm	Indiana State	Plaster Sports Complex; Springfield, MO		L 20–28	5,278	
November 19	12:00 pm	at Youngstown State	Stambaugh Stadium; Youngstown, OH		W 38–34	11,102	
*Non-conference game; ^{†}Homecoming; Rankings from The Sports Network Poll released prior to the game; All times are in Central time
