= 2011 Illinois State Redbirds football team =

American college football season

2011 Illinois State Redbirds football
- Conference: Missouri Valley Football Conference

Ranking
- Sports Network: No. 18
- FCS Coaches: No. 17
- Record: 7–4 (5–3 MVFC)
- Head coach: Brock Spack (3rd season)
- Offensive coordinator: Luke Huard (2nd season)
- Defensive coordinator: Steve Szabo (1st season)
- MVPs: Josh Howe; Eric Brunner; Cal McCarty; Nick Bledsoe Cody White Milton Owens Keenan Wimbley
- Captains: Cal McCarthy; Cody White; Matt Brown; Eric Brunner
- Home stadium: Hancock Stadium

2011 Missouri Valley Football Conference standings
	Conf.			Overall
Team	W		L	W		L
No. 1 North Dakota State +^	7	–	1	14	–	1
No. 6 Northern Iowa +^	7	–	1	10	–	3
No. 20 Illinois State	5	–	3	7	–	4
Indiana State	4	–	4	6	–	5
Youngstown State	4	–	4	6	–	5
South Dakota State	4	–	4	5	–	6
Southern Illinois	2	–	6	4	–	7
Missouri State	2	–	6	2	–	9
Western Illinois	1	–	7	2	–	9
+ – Conference co-champions; ^ – FCS playoff participant; Rankings from The Sports Network poll

The 2011 Illinois State Redbirds football team represented Illinois State University as a member of the Missouri Valley Football Conference (MVFC) during the 2011 NCAA Division I FCS football season. Led by third-year head coach Brock Spack, the Redbirds compiled an overall record of 7–4 with a mark of 5–3 in conference play, placing third in the MVFC. Illinois State played home games at Hancock Stadium in Normal, Illinois.

== Schedule ==
Date	Time	Opponent	Rank	Site	TV	Result	Attendance	Source
September 1	6:30 pm	at Eastern Illinois*		O'Brien Stadium; Charleston, IL	CSNC	L 26–33	9,111	
September 10	6:30 pm	Morehead State*		Hancock Stadium; Normal, IL		W 52–21	8,003	
September 17	3:00 pm	at Youngstown State		Stambaugh Stadium; Youngstown, OH		L 27–34	18,543	
September 24	6:00 pm	South Dakota State		Hancock Stadium; Normal, IL		W 20–13	7,536	
October 1	1:00 pm	at No. 5 North Dakota State		Fargodome; Fargo, ND	CSNC	L 10–20	18,904	
October 8	2:00 pm	at Missouri State		Plaster Sports Complex; Springfield, MO		W 38–13	10,800	
October 15	3:00 pm	No. 15 South Dakota*^{†}		Hancock Stadium; Normal, IL		W 28–3	10,014	
October 22	1:00 pm	No. 17 Indiana State		Hancock Stadium; Normal, IL	ESPN3	W 17–14	6,867	
October 29	2:00 pm	at Southern Illinois	No. 22	Saluki Stadium; Carbondale, IL	CSNC	W 38–30	8,129	
November 5	1:00 pm	Western Illinois	No. 17	Hancock Stadium; Normal, IL		W 31–7	10,179	
November 19	11:00 am	No. 4 Northern Iowa	No. 14	Hancock Stadium; Normal, IL	ESPN3	L 20–23 ^{2OT}	6,092	
*Non-conference game; ^{†}Homecoming; Rankings from The Sports Network Poll released prior to the game; All times are in Central time
