= 2011 Eastern Illinois Panthers football team =

American college football season

2011 Eastern Illinois Panthers football
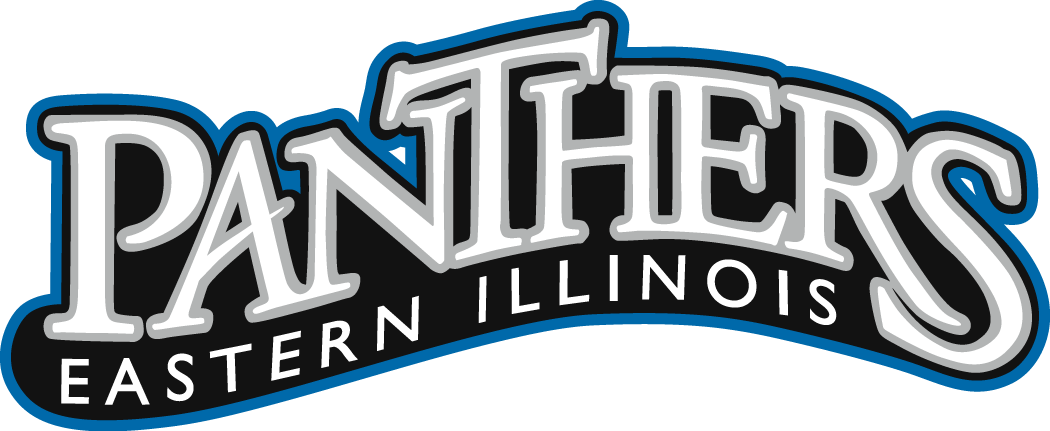
- Conference: Ohio Valley Conference
- Record: 2–9 (1–7 OVC)
- Head coach: Bob Spoo (24th season)
- Offensive coordinator: Roy Wittke (17th season)
- Defensive coordinator: Roc Bellantoni (10th season)
- Home stadium: O'Brien Field

2011 Ohio Valley Conference football standings
	Conf.			Overall
Team	W		L	W		L
No. 21 Tennessee Tech +^	6	–	2	7	–	4
Eastern Kentucky +^	6	–	2	7	–	5
Jacksonville State +	6	–	2	7	–	4
Murray State	5	–	3	7	–	4
Tennessee State	4	–	4	5	–	6
UT Martin	4	–	4	5	–	6
Austin Peay	2	–	6	3	–	8
Southeast Missouri State	2	–	6	3	–	8
Eastern Illinois	1	–	7	2	–	9
+ – Conference co-champions; ^ – FCS playoff participant; Rankings from The Sports Network poll

The 2011 Eastern Illinois Panthers football team represented Eastern Illinois University as a member of the Ohio Valley Conference (OVC) during the 2011 NCAA Division I FCS football season. Led by Bob Spoo in his 24th and final year as head coach, the Panthers compiled an overall record of 2–9 with a mark of 1–7 in conference play, placing last out of nine teams in the OVC. Eastern Illinois played home games at O'Brien Field in Charleston, Illinois.

== Schedule ==
Date	Time	Opponent	Site	TV	Result	Attendance
September 1	6:30 pm	Illinois State*	O'Brien Field; Charleston, IL (rivalry)	CSN Chicago	W 33–26	9,111
September 10	2:30 pm	at Northwestern*	Ryan Field; Evanston, IL	BTN	L 21–42	28,042
September 17	6:30 pm	Tennessee Tech	O'Brien Field; Charleston, IL		L 20–31	6,157
September 24	6:00 pm	at No. 16 Jacksonville State	JSU Stadium; Jacksonville, AL		L 21–28	14,813
October 1	6:00 pm	at Southeast Missouri State	Houck Stadium; Cape Girardeau, MO		L 30–37	7,757
October 8	1:30 pm	Eastern Kentucky	O'Brien Field; Charleston, IL	WEIU	L 16–48	9,063
October 15	3:00 pm	at Murray State	Roy Stewart Stadium; Murray, KY		L 27–36	7,857
October 22	1:30 pm	UT Martin^{†}	O'Brien Field; Charleston, IL	WEIU	L 23–24	6,832
October 29	4:00 pm	at Austin Peay	Governors Stadium; Clarksville, TN		W 19–10	5,273
November 5	1:30 pm	Tennessee State	O'Brien Field; Charleston, IL	WEIU	L 17–18	6,774
November 12	2:00 pm	at Southern Illinois*	Saluki Stadium; Carbondale, IL		L 28–45	7,447
*Non-conference game; ^{†}Homecoming; Rankings from The Sports Network Poll released prior to the game; All times are in Central time
