= 2011 Murray State Racers football team =

American college football season

2011 Murray State Racers football
- Conference: Ohio Valley Conference
- Record: 7–4 (5–3 OVC)
- Head coach: Chris Hatcher (2nd season)
- Offensive coordinator: Mitch Stewart (1st season)
- Offensive scheme: Air raid
- Defensive coordinator: Ashley Anders (2nd season)
- Base defense: 4–3
- Home stadium: Roy Stewart Stadium

2011 Ohio Valley Conference football standings
	Conf.			Overall
Team	W		L	W		L
No. 21 Tennessee Tech +^	6	–	2	7	–	4
Eastern Kentucky +^	6	–	2	7	–	5
Jacksonville State +	6	–	2	7	–	4
Murray State	5	–	3	7	–	4
Tennessee State	4	–	4	5	–	6
UT Martin	4	–	4	5	–	6
Austin Peay	2	–	6	3	–	8
Southeast Missouri State	2	–	6	3	–	8
Eastern Illinois	1	–	7	2	–	9
+ – Conference co-champions; ^ – FCS playoff participant; Rankings from The Sports Network poll

The 2011 Murray State Racers football team represented Murray State University in the 2011 NCAA Division I FCS football season. The Racers were led by second-year head coach Chris Hatcher and played their home games at Roy Stewart Stadium. They are a member of the Ohio Valley Conference. They finished the season 7–4, 5–3 in OVC play to finish in fourth place. Average home attendance for the 2011 season was 5,642.

== Schedule ==
Date	Time	Opponent	Rank	Site	TV	Result	Attendance
September 1	5:00 pm	at Louisville*		Papa John's Cardinal Stadium; Louisville, KY	ESPNU	L 9–21	46,157
September 10	4:00 pm	at Mississippi Valley State*		Rice–Totten Field; Itta Bena, MS	Racer TV Network/ESPN3	W 39–0	2,209
September 17	6:00 pm	Tennessee State		Roy Stewart Stadium; Murray, KY		W 58–27	10,031
September 22	6:00 pm	at UT Martin	No. 24	Graham Stadium; Martin, TN		L 26–48	5,281
October 1	6:00 pm	No. 14 Jacksonville State		Roy Stewart Stadium; Murray, KY		L 30–38	3,838
October 8	12:00 pm	at Georgia State*		Georgia Dome; Atlanta, GA	Racer TV Network/ESPN3	W 48–24	10,963
October 15	3:00 pm	Eastern Illinois^{†}		Roy Stewart Stadium; Murray, KY	Racer TV Network/ESPN3	W 36–27	7,857
October 29	1:00 pm	Eastern Kentucky		Roy Stewart Stadium; Murray, KY		L 33–34	3,466
November 5	1:30 pm	at No. 20 Tennessee Tech		Tucker Stadium; Cookeville, TN	Racer TV Network/ESPN3	W 38–37	16,845
November 12	1:00 pm	Austin Peay		Roy Stewart Stadium; Murray, KY		W 56–24	3,018
November 19	1:00 pm	at Southeast Missouri State		Houck Stadium; Cape Girardeau, MO	Racer TV Network	W 35–34	2,138
*Non-conference game; ^{†}Homecoming; Rankings from The Sports Network Poll released prior to the game; All times are in Central time
