= 2011 Southeast Missouri State Redhawks football team =

American college football season

2011 Southeast Missouri State Redhawks football
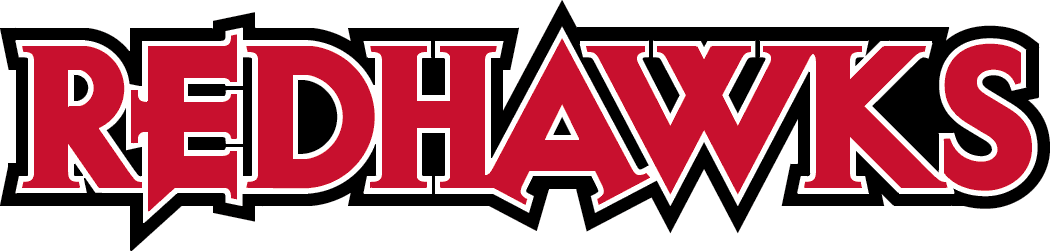
- Conference: Ohio Valley Conference
- Record: 3–8 (2–6 OVC)
- Head coach: Tony Samuel (6th season)
- Offensive coordinator: Tim McGuire (1st season)
- Defensive coordinator: Brian Mohnsen (1st season)
- Home stadium: Houck Stadium

2011 Ohio Valley Conference football standings
	Conf.			Overall
Team	W		L	W		L
No. 21 Tennessee Tech +^	6	–	2	7	–	4
Eastern Kentucky +^	6	–	2	7	–	5
Jacksonville State +	6	–	2	7	–	4
Murray State	5	–	3	7	–	4
Tennessee State	4	–	4	5	–	6
UT Martin	4	–	4	5	–	6
Austin Peay	2	–	6	3	–	8
Southeast Missouri State	2	–	6	3	–	8
Eastern Illinois	1	–	7	2	–	9
+ – Conference co-champions; ^ – FCS playoff participant; Rankings from The Sports Network poll

The 2011 Southeast Missouri State Redhawks football team represented Southeast Missouri State University as a member of the Ohio Valley Conference (OVC) during the 2011 NCAA Division I FCS football season. Led by sixth-year head coach Tony Samuel, the Redhawks compiled an overall record of 3–8 with a mark of 2–6 in conference play, tying for seventh place in the OVC. Southeast Missouri State played home games at Houck Stadium in Cape Girardeau, Missouri.

== Schedule ==
Date	Time	Opponent	Site	TV	Result	Attendance
September 3	6:00 pm	No. 19 Southern Illinois*	Houck Stadium; Cape Girardeau, MO		L 10–38	10,136
September 17	11:00 am	at Purdue*	Ross–Ade Stadium; West Lafayette, IN	BTN	L 0–59	46,116
September 24	7:00 pm	at Tennessee Tech	Tucker Stadium; Cookeville, TN		L 31–38	8,251
October 1	6:00 pm	Eastern Illinois	Houck Stadium; Cape Girardeau, MO		W 37–30	7,757
October 8	6:00 pm	at Tennessee State	LP Field; Nashville, TN		L 3–55	6,234
October 15	2:00 pm	at Eastern Kentucky	Roy Kidd Stadium; Richmond, KY		L 17–41	4,100
October 22	1:00 pm	Austin Peay^{†}	Houck Stadium; Cape Girardeau, MO		W 17–13	6,800
October 29	6:30 pm	at UT Martin	Graham Stadium; Martin, TN		L 30–38	3,349
November 5	1:00 pm	Central Methodist*	Houck Stadium; Cape Girardeau, MO		W 55–44	3,211
November 12	1:00 pm	Jacksonville State	Houck Stadium; Cape Girardeau, MO		L 21–22	1,984
November 19	1:00 pm	Murray State	Houck Stadium; Cape Girardeau, MO	ESPN3	L 34–35	2,138
*Non-conference game; ^{†}Homecoming; Rankings from The Sports Network Poll released prior to the game; All times are in Central time
