= 2011 Youngstown State Penguins football team =

American college football season

2011 Youngstown State Penguins football
- Conference: Missouri Valley Football Conference
- Record: 6–5 (4–4 MVFC)
- Head coach: Eric Wolford (2nd season)
- Offensive coordinator: Shane Montgomery (2nd season)
- Defensive coordinator: Rick Kravitz (2nd season)
- Home stadium: Stambaugh Stadium

2011 Missouri Valley Football Conference standings
	Conf.			Overall
Team	W		L	W		L
No. 1 North Dakota State +^	7	–	1	14	–	1
No. 6 Northern Iowa +^	7	–	1	10	–	3
No. 20 Illinois State	5	–	3	7	–	4
Indiana State	4	–	4	6	–	5
Youngstown State	4	–	4	6	–	5
South Dakota State	4	–	4	5	–	6
Southern Illinois	2	–	6	4	–	7
Missouri State	2	–	6	2	–	9
Western Illinois	1	–	7	2	–	9
+ – Conference co-champions; ^ – FCS playoff participant; Rankings from The Sports Network poll

The 2011 Youngstown State Penguins football team represented Youngstown State University as a member of the Missouri Valley Football Conference (MVFC) during the 2011 NCAA Division I FCS football season. Led by second-year head coach Eric Wolford, the Penguins compiled an overall record of 6–5 with a mark of 4–4 in conference play, placing in a three-way tie for fourth in the MVFC. Youngstown State played their home games at Stambaugh Stadium in Youngstown, Ohio.

== Schedule ==
Date	Time	Opponent	Site	TV	Result	Attendance	Source
September 2	7:30 pm	at No. 17 (FBS) Michigan State*	Spartan Stadium; East Lansing, MI	BTN	L 6–28	75,910	
September 10	4:00 pm	Valparaiso*	Stambaugh Stadium; Youngstown, OH		W 77–13	14,117	
September 17	4:00 pm	Illinois State	Stambaugh Stadium; Youngstown, OH		W 34–27	18,543	
September 24	2:00 pm	at Indiana State	Memorial Stadium; Terre Haute, IN		L 35–37	6,523	
October 8	4:00 pm	South Dakota State	Stambaugh Stadium; Youngstown, OH		L 28–35	16,209	
October 15	3:00 pm	at Southern Illinois	Saluki Stadium; Carbondale, IL		W 35–23	12,796	
October 22	4:00 pm	Saint Francis (PA)*	Stambaugh Stadium; Youngstown, OH		W 49–23	11,313	
October 29	1:00 pm	Western Illinois	Stambaugh Stadium; Youngstown, OH		W 56–14	11,583	
November 5	5:00 pm	at No. 6 Northern Iowa	UNI-Dome; Cedar Falls, IA		L 17–21	11,523	
November 12	4:00 pm	at No. 1 North Dakota State	Fargodome; Fargo, ND		W 27–24	18,450	
November 19	1:00 pm	Missouri State	Stambaugh Stadium; Youngstown, OH		L 34–38	11,102	
*Non-conference game; Rankings from The Sports Network Poll released prior to the game; All times are in Eastern time
