= 2011 Jacksonville State Gamecocks football team =

American college football season

2011 Jacksonville State Gamecocks football

OVC co-champion
- Conference: Ohio Valley Conference
- Record: 7–4 (6–2 OVC)
- Head coach: Jack Crowe (12th season)
- Offensive coordinator: Ronnie Letson (8th season)
- Defensive coordinator: Chris Boone (1st season)
- Home stadium: Burgess–Snow Field at JSU Stadium

2011 Ohio Valley Conference football standings
	Conf.			Overall
Team	W		L	W		L
No. 21 Tennessee Tech +^	6	–	2	7	–	4
Eastern Kentucky +^	6	–	2	7	–	5
Jacksonville State +	6	–	2	7	–	4
Murray State	5	–	3	7	–	4
Tennessee State	4	–	4	5	–	6
UT Martin	4	–	4	5	–	6
Austin Peay	2	–	6	3	–	8
Southeast Missouri State	2	–	6	3	–	8
Eastern Illinois	1	–	7	2	–	9
+ – Conference co-champions; ^ – FCS playoff participant; Rankings from The Sports Network poll

The 2011 Jacksonville State Gamecocks football team represented Jacksonville State University as a member of the Ohio Valley Conference (OVC) during the 2011 NCAA Division I FCS football season. Led by 12th-year head coach Jack Crowe, the Gamecocks compiled an overall record of 7–4 with a mark of 6–2 in conference play, sharing the OVC title with Eastern Kentucky and Tennessee Tech. Despite the conference title, Jacksonville State was not invited to the NCAA Division I Football Championship playoffs. The Gamecocks lost to both Tennessee Tech and Eastern Kentucky. The team played home games at Burgess–Snow Field at JSU Stadium in Jacksonville, Alabama.

== Schedule ==
Date	Time	Opponent	Rank	Site	TV	Result	Attendance
September 1	6:00 pm	UT Martin	No. 9	Burgess–Snow Field at JSU Stadium; Jacksonville, AL	ESPN3	W 24–23	17,919
September 10	5:00 pm	at No. 23 Chattanooga*	No. 10	Finley Stadium; Chattanooga, TN		L 17–38	12,185
September 17	2:30 pm	Georgia State*	No. 17	Burgess–Snow Field at JSU Stadium; Jacksonville, AL	CSS	W 37–21	17,618
September 24	6:00 pm	Eastern Illinois	No. 16	Burgess–Snow Field at JSU Stadium; Jacksonville, AL		W 28–21	14,813
October 1	7:00 pm	at Murray State	No. 14	Roy Stewart Stadium; Murray, KY		W 38–30	3,838
October 15	7:00 pm	at Austin Peay	No. 11	Governors Stadium; Clarksville, TN		W 44–14	5,186
October 22	12:00 pm	at Kentucky*	No. 10	Commonwealth Stadium; Lexington, KY	ESPNU	L 14–38	54,098
October 29	4:00 pm	No. 25 Tennessee Tech^{†}	No. 14	Burgess–Snow Field at JSU Stadium; Jacksonville, AL	ESPN3	L 14–21	18,933
November 5	4:00 pm	Eastern Kentucky	No. 18	Burgess–Snow Field at JSU Stadium; Jacksonville, AL	ESPN3	L 48–52	16,845
November 12	2:00 pm	at Southeast Missouri State		Houck Stadium; Cape Girardeau, MO		W 22–21	1,984
November 19	3:00 pm	at Tennessee State		LP Field; Nashville, TN		W 38–16	6,137
*Non-conference game; ^{†}Homecoming; Rankings from The Sports Network Poll released prior to the game; All times are in Eastern time
