= 2011 Eastern Kentucky Colonels football team =

American college football season

2011 Eastern Kentucky Colonels football
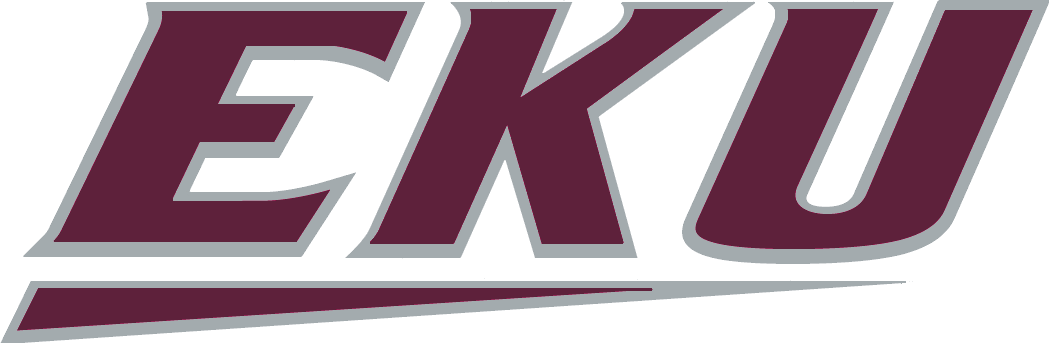

OVC co-champion

FCS Playoffs First Round, L 17–20 vs. James Madison
- Conference: Ohio Valley Conference
- Record: 7–5 (6–2 OVC)
- Head coach: Dean Hood (4th season)
- Offensive coordinator: Dane Damron (1st season)
- Defensive coordinator: Tony Hatmaker (1st season)
- Home stadium: Roy Kidd Stadium

2011 Ohio Valley Conference football standings
	Conf.			Overall
Team	W		L	W		L
No. 21 Tennessee Tech +^	6	–	2	7	–	4
Eastern Kentucky +^	6	–	2	7	–	5
Jacksonville State +	6	–	2	7	–	4
Murray State	5	–	3	7	–	4
Tennessee State	4	–	4	5	–	6
UT Martin	4	–	4	5	–	6
Austin Peay	2	–	6	3	–	8
Southeast Missouri State	2	–	6	3	–	8
Eastern Illinois	1	–	7	2	–	9
+ – Conference co-champions; ^ – FCS playoff participant; Rankings from The Sports Network poll

The 2011 Eastern Kentucky Colonels football team represented Eastern Kentucky University in the 2011 NCAA Division I FCS football season. The Colonels were led by fourth-year head coach Dean Hood and played their home games at Roy Kidd Stadium. They were a member of the Ohio Valley Conference (OVC). Eastern Kentucky finished the season with an overall record 7–5 with a 6–2 mark in OVC play. They shared the conference title with Jacksonville State and Tennessee Tech. They received an at-large bid to the FCS playoffs, where they lost in the first round to James Madison.

== Schedule ==
Date	Time	Opponent	Rank	Site	TV	Result	Attendance
September 3	7:00 pm	at Kansas State*		Bill Snyder Family Football Stadium; Manhattan, KS		L 7–10	50,292
September 10	6:00 pm	Missouri State*		Roy Kidd Stadium; Richmond, KY		W 28–24	9,200
September 17	6:00 pm	No. 14 Chattanooga*		Roy Kidd Stadium; Richmond, KY		L 14–23	10,100
September 24	7:00 pm	at Austin Peay		Governors Stadium; Clarksville, TN		L 17–23	5,634
October 8	2:30 pm	at Eastern Illinois		O'Brien Stadium; Charleston, IL		W 48–16	9,063
October 15	3:00 pm	Southeast Missouri State		Roy Kidd Stadium; Richmond, KY		W 41–17	4,100
October 22	3:00 pm	Tennessee State		Roy Kidd Stadium; Richmond, KY		W 33–22	10,800
October 29	2:00 pm	Murray State		Roy Stewart Stadium; Murray, KY		W 34–33	3,466
November 5	4:00 pm	at No. 18 Jacksonville State		JSU Stadium; Jacksonville, AL	ESPN3	W 52–48	16,845
November 12	1:00 pm	Tennessee Tech	No. 25	Roy Kidd Stadium; Richmond, KY		L 21–28	6,100
November 19	1:00 pm	UT Martin		Roy Kidd Stadium; Richmond, KY		W 23–16	3,300
November 26	12:00 pm	No. 17 James Madison*		Roy Kidd Stadium; Richmond, KY (FCS Playoffs First Round)	ESPNU	L 17–20	2,388
*Non-conference game; Rankings from The Sports Network Poll released prior to the game; All times are in Eastern time
