= 2011 Western Illinois Leathernecks football team =

American college football season

2011 Western Illinois Leathernecks football
- Conference: Missouri Valley Football Conference
- Record: 2–9 (1–7 MVFC)
- Head coach: Mark Hendrickson (4th season)
- Offensive coordinator: Doug Ruse (2nd season)
- Defensive coordinator: Thomas Casey (7th season)
- Home stadium: Hanson Field

2011 Missouri Valley Football Conference standings
	Conf.			Overall
Team	W		L	W		L
No. 1 North Dakota State +^	7	–	1	14	–	1
No. 6 Northern Iowa +^	7	–	1	10	–	3
No. 20 Illinois State	5	–	3	7	–	4
Indiana State	4	–	4	6	–	5
Youngstown State	4	–	4	6	–	5
South Dakota State	4	–	4	5	–	6
Southern Illinois	2	–	6	4	–	7
Missouri State	2	–	6	2	–	9
Western Illinois	1	–	7	2	–	9
+ – Conference co-champions; ^ – FCS playoff participant; Rankings from The Sports Network poll

The 2011 Western Illinois Leathernecks football team represented Western Illinois University as a member of the Missouri Valley Football Conference (MFVC) during the 2011 NCAA Division I FCS football season. Led by fourth-year head coach Mark Hendrickson, the Leathernecks compiled an overall record of 2–9 overall with mark of 1–7 in conference play, placing last out of nine teams in the MVFC. Western Illinois played home games at Hanson Field in Macomb, Illinois.

== Schedule ==
Date	Time	Opponent	Site	Result	Attendance	Source
September 1	6:00 pm	at Sam Houston State*	Bowers Stadium; Huntsville, TX	L 6–20	6,020	
September 10	1:00 pm	Jacksonville*	Hanson Field; Macomb, IL	W 35–21	10,196	
September 17	6:00 pm	at Missouri*	Faurot Field; Columbia, MO	L 0–69	63,420	
September 24	4:00 pm	at No. 2 Northern Iowa	UNI-Dome; Cedar Falls, IA	L 10–38	16,059	
October 1	3:00 pm	No. 12 Southern Illinois^{†}	Hanson Field; Macomb, IL	W 27–21	14,168	
October 15	2:00 pm	at No. 21 Indiana State	Memorial Stadium; Terre Haute, IN	L 24–46	8,255	
October 22	6:00 pm	Missouri State	Hanson Field; Macomb, IL	L 17–31	10,041	
October 29	12:00 pm	at Youngstown State	Stambaugh Stadium; Youngstown, OH	L 14–56	11,583	
November 5	1:00 pm	at No. 17 Illinois State	Hancock Stadium; Normal, IL	L 7–31	10,179	
November 12	1:00 pm	South Dakota State	Hanson Field; Macomb, IL	L 7–27	3,821	
November 19	1:00 pm	No. 5 North Dakota State	Hanson Field; Macomb, IL	L 21–37	3,560	
*Non-conference game; ^{†}Homecoming; Rankings from The Sports Network Poll released prior to the game; All times are in Central time
