= Ryan Smith (wide receiver) =

American gridiron football player (born 1991)

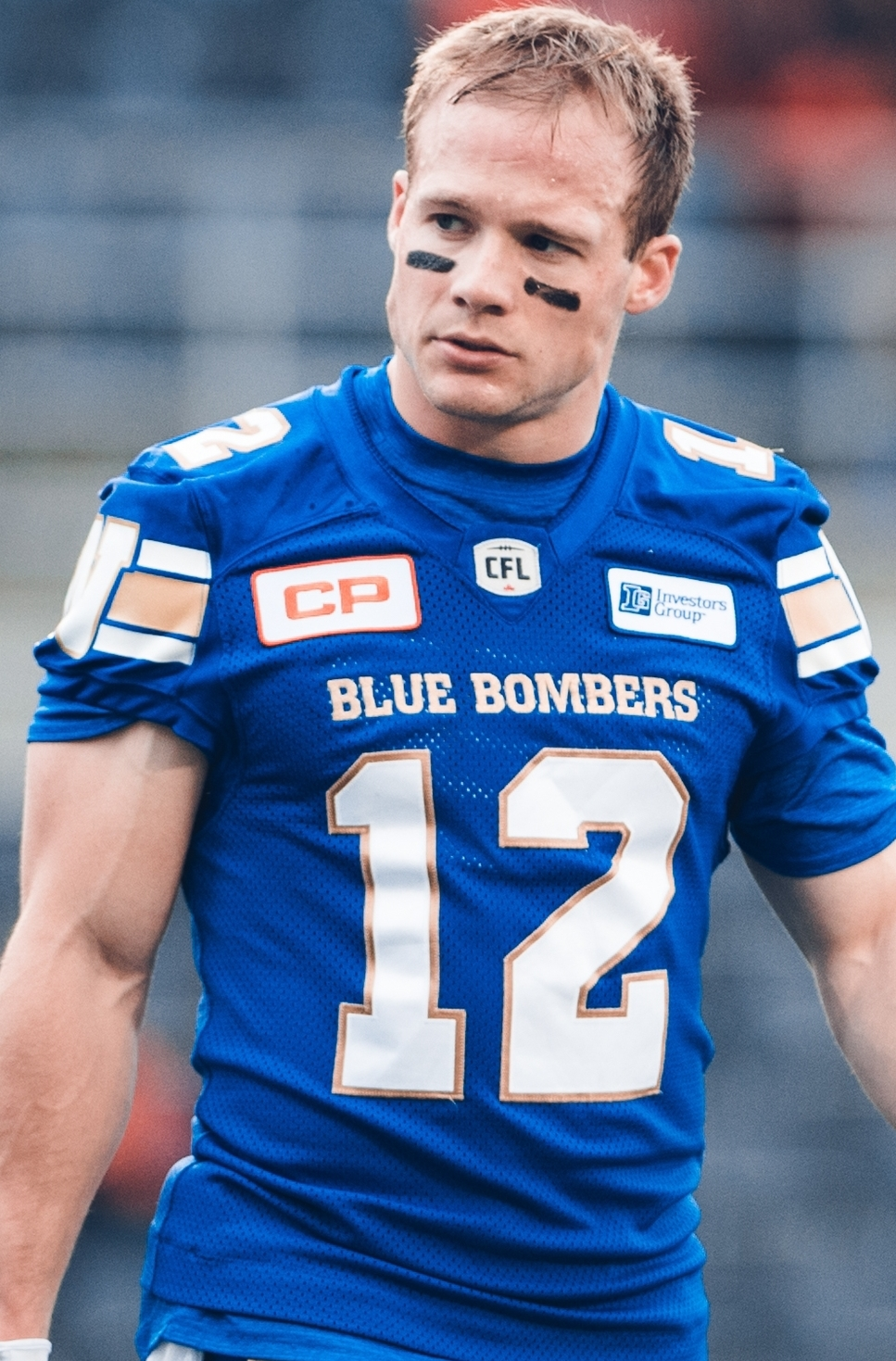
- Smith in 2016

No. 12
- Position: Wide receiver

Personal information
- Born: August 19, 1991 (age 35); Wahpeton, North Dakota, U.S.
- Listed height: 5 ft 7 in (1.70 m)
- Listed weight: 182 lb (83 kg)

Career information
- High school: Wahpeton High School
- College: NDSU

Career history
- 2014–2015: Saskatchewan Roughriders
- 2016: Winnipeg Blue Bombers

Awards and highlights
- 3× FCS national champion (2011–2013)
- Stats at CFL.ca

Ryan Smith (born August 19, 1991) is a former American professional Canadian football wide receiver who played for the Saskatchewan Roughriders and Winnipeg Blue Bombers of the Canadian Football League (CFL). He played college football for North Dakota State University.

== Early life ==
He is a 2010 graduate of Wahpeton High School and a two-time all-state and all-conference running back for the Wahpeton Huskies. Smith rushed for 2,781 yards as a senior and 2,135 yards as a junior. The Huskies went 12-1 and reached the state AA semifinals in 2009, and went 9-3 and advanced to the state AAA quarterfinals in 2008 ... 2009-10 Old Spice National Red Zone Player of the Year ... Holds a dozen Wahpeton High School football records ... Rushed nine times for 40 yards and caught five passes for 45 in Team North Dakota's 41-38 win over Montana in the Badlands Bowl ... It was North Dakota's first win since 2007 ... Won the state 100 meter dash championship in 2009 and was member of the 2009 Eastern Dakota Conference basketball championship team ... Set the EDC records in the 100 and 200

== Statistics ==
| Receiving | | Regular season | | | | | | Playoffs |
| Year | Team | Games | No. | Yards | Avg | Long | TD | Games | No. | Yards | Avg | Long | TD |
|---|---|---|---|---|---|---|---|---|---|---|---|---|---|
| 2014 | SSK | 8 | 13 | 159 | 12.2 | 39 | 0 |
| 2015 | SSK | 16 | 59 | 991 | 16.8 | 68 | 7 |
| CFL totals | | 24 | 72 | 1,150 | 15.9 | 68 | 7 |

== Personal life ==
Smith was born to Randy and Trudi Smith on August 19, 1991, in Wahpeton, North Dakota.

Smith has two sisters, KiKi and Allie, who also competed in track & field at the University of South Dakota. KiKi ran track at NDSU, Ryan's alma mater, during the 2001–02 season. Smith's father, Randy Smith, played football and ran track at Northern State University. Smith's mother, Trudi, played volleyball and ran track at the University of Jamestown.

Smith's college major is in business administration.
