= Marcus Williams (cornerback) =

American football player (born 1991)

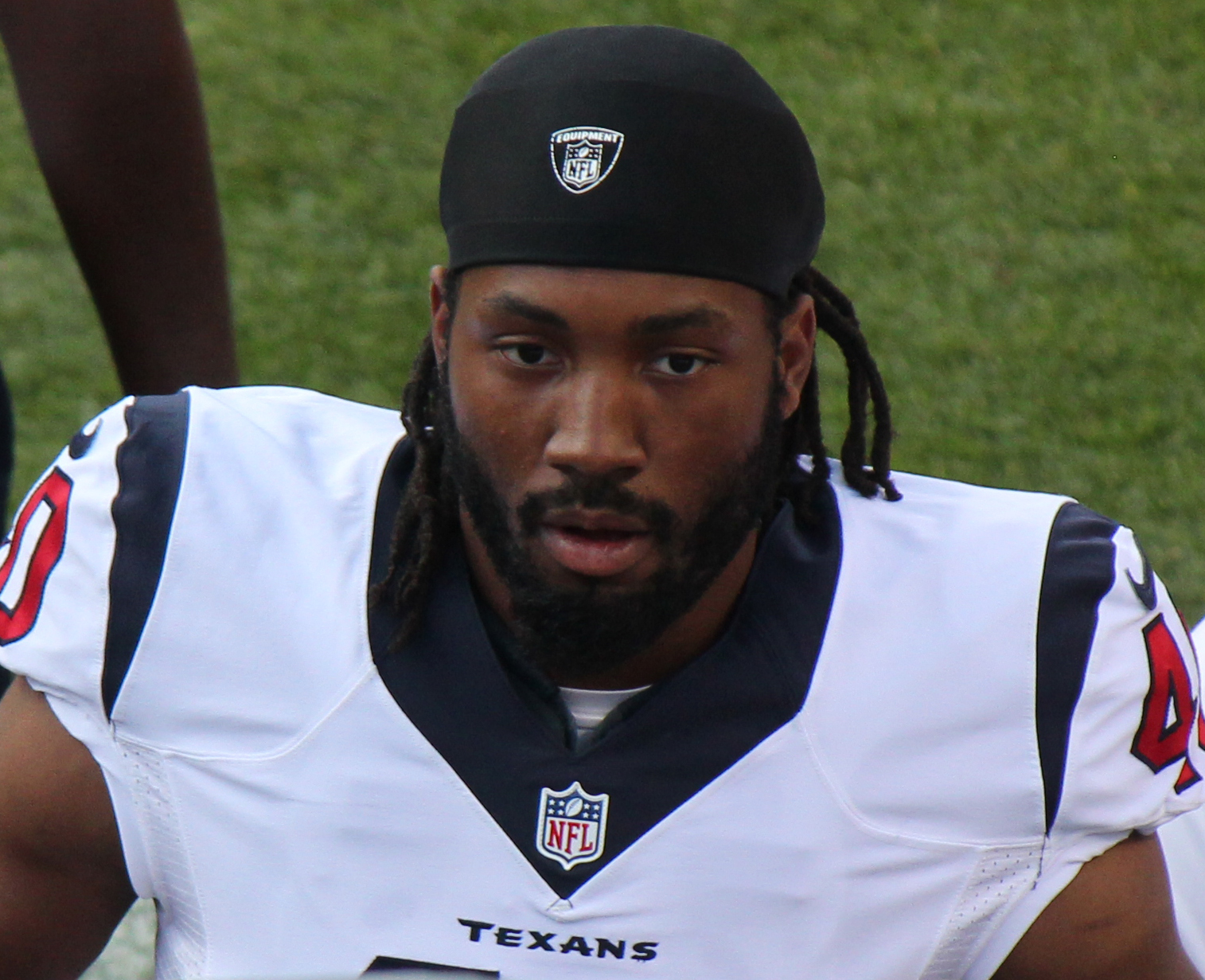
- Williams with the Houston Texans in 2014

No. 20, 22, 31, 40
- Position: Cornerback

Personal information
- Born: March 24, 1991 (age 35); Minneapolis, Minnesota, U.S.
- Listed height: 5 ft 11 in (1.80 m)
- Listed weight: 196 lb (89 kg)

Career information
- High school: Hopkins (Minnetonka, Minnesota)
- College: North Dakota State
- NFL draft: 2014: undrafted

Career history
- Houston Texans (2014)*; New York Jets (2014–2017); Houston Texans (2017); Arizona Cardinals (2018)*; New Orleans Saints (2018)*; Tampa Bay Buccaneers (2018); Chicago Bears (2018)
- * Offseason or practice squad member only

Awards and highlights
- 3× FCS national champion (2011–2013)

Career NFL statistics
- Total tackles: 118
- Sacks: 2.5
- Forced fumbles: 2
- Pass deflections: 27
- Interceptions: 10
- Stats at Pro Football Reference

Marcus Jeffrey Williams (born March 24, 1991) is an American former professional football player who was a cornerback in the National Football League (NFL). He was signed by the Houston Texans as an undrafted free agent in 2014. He played college football for the North Dakota State Bison. He was also a member of the New York Jets, Arizona Cardinals, New Orleans Saints, Tampa Bay Buccaneers, and Chicago Bears.

== Early life ==
Williams stood out at Hopkins High School in Minnetonka, MN in both basketball and football, and decided on playing football at North Dakota State University since he didn't receive a Big 10 offer for basketball.

== College career ==
Williams set the NDSU school record with 21 career interceptions. Williams also set the FCS D1-AA record with career interception returns for touchdown with 7. He had 8 defensive touchdowns in total.

Williams received Associated Press First-team All-American honors in 2011, 2012, and 2013, as well as Walter Camp FCS All American Team honors in 2011, 2012, & 2013.

== Professional career ==
Pre-draft measurables
Height	Weight	Arm length	Hand span	40-yard dash	10-yard split	20-yard split	20-yard shuttle	Three-cone drill	Vertical jump	Broad jump	Bench press
5 ft 11 in (1.80 m)	196 lb (89 kg)	31 1/4 in (0.79 m)	9 1/2 in (0.24 m)	4.57 s	1.59 s	2.65 s	4.27 s	7.18 s	35.0 in (0.89 m)	9 ft 9 in (2.97 m)	15 reps
All values from Pro Day

=== Houston Texans (first stint) ===
On May 16, 2014, Williams signed with the Houston Texans. On August 30, 2014, Williams was released by the Texans.

=== New York Jets ===
Williams was signed to the New York Jets' practice squad on September 26, 2014. He was promoted to the active roster on October 28, 2014. In his debut against the Kansas City Chiefs on November 2, 2014, he played for the majority of the game. He had a team-high seven tackles and one pass defensed, earning the praise of head coach Rex Ryan for his performance. In 8 games of his rookie season in 2014, Williams made 37 tackles, an interception, and seven passes defended.

On October 4, 2015, he made a game clinching interception against the Miami Dolphins in a game in London. One month later, against the Jacksonville Jaguars, he got two interceptions, a career-high, one of which clinched the game. On December 19, 2015, he made the game winning interception against the Dallas Cowboys, his third game winning interception of the season. Despite being a substitute cornerback, Williams would appear in 13 games making 21 tackles, six interceptions, 1.5 sacks, ten passes defended, a forced fumble, and a fumble recovery.

On March 9, 2017, the Jets placed a second-round tender on Williams. On October 9, 2017, Williams was released by the Jets.

=== Houston Texans (second stint) ===
On October 10, 2017, Williams was claimed off waivers by the Texans. On October 30, 2017, he recorded his first interception of the season, picking off the Seattle Seahawks' Russell Wilson in the fourth quarter. He finished his second stint with the Texans with twelve tackles and an interception in ten games.

=== Arizona Cardinals ===
On April 19, 2018, Williams signed a one-year deal with the Arizona Cardinals. On May 21, 2018, Williams was released by the Cardinals.

=== New Orleans Saints ===
On August 11, 2018, Williams signed with the New Orleans Saints. He was released on September 1, 2018.

=== Tampa Bay Buccaneers ===
On September 11, 2018, Williams signed with the Tampa Bay Buccaneers. He was placed on injured reserve on October 13, 2018, with a hamstring injury. He was released on October 22, 2018.

=== Chicago Bears ===
On December 12, 2018, Williams was signed by the Chicago Bears.
