= Sam Ojuri =

American football player and coach

Current position
- Title: Running backs coach
- Team: North Dakota State
- Conference: MVFC

Biographical details
- Born: Barrington, Illinois, U.S.
- Education: North Dakota State University (B.S. 2014)

Playing career
- 2009–2013: North Dakota State
- Position: Running back

Coaching career (HC unless noted)
- 2017: Elgin HS (IL) (RB/DB)
- 2018: Wisconsin–Stevens Point (RB)
- 2019–2020: Wyoming (GA – TE/FB)
- 2020–2024: Illinois State (RB)
- 2025–present: North Dakota State (RB)

Accomplishments and honors

Championships
- 3× NCAA Division I FCS (2011, 2012, 2013) (player)

Samuel Ojuri (born September 22, 1990) is an American college football coach and former running back. He is the running backs coach for his alma mater North Dakota State University, a position he has held since 2025. He played college football for North Dakota State and professionally for the Hamilton Tiger-Cats, Saskatchewan Roughriders, and the BC Lions of the Canadian Football League (CFL).

== College career ==
Ojuri played for the North Dakota State Bison from 2011 to 2013. He recorded career 616 carries for 3,594 yards and 33 touchdowns while adding 210 receiving yards and one receiving touchdown. He rushed for more than 1,000 yards in all three seasons. The Bison won the NCAA Division I FCS national championship in 2011, 2012, 2013 and 2014.

== Professional career ==
=== Hamilton Tiger-Cats ===
On July 14, 2014, Ojuri signed with the Hamilton Tiger-Cats of the Canadian Football League (CFL) after going undrafted in the 2014 NFL draft.

=== Saskatchewan Roughriders ===
In 2015, Ojuri signed with the Saskatchewan Roughriders.

=== BC Lions ===
On February 5, 2016, Ojuri signed with the BC Lions. On May 5, 2016, he was released.

== Coaching career ==
In 2017, Ojuri was hired as the running backs coach and defensive backs coach for Elgin High School.

In 2018, Ojuri was hired as the running backs coach and fullbacks coach for Wisconsin–Stevens Point.

In 2019, Ojuri joined Wyoming as a graduate assistant.

In 2021, Ojuri was hired as the running backs coach for Illinois State.

He joined the North Dakota State coaching staff in February 2025, returning to Fargo to lead the position group where he once starred as a player.
