= Bryan Shepherd =

American football player and coach (born 1991)

Montana State Bobcats
- Title: Cornerbacks coach

Personal information
- Born: March 2, 1991 (age 35); Olathe, Kansas, U.S.
- Listed height: 5 ft 10 in (1.78 m)
- Listed weight: 180 lb (82 kg)

Career information
- High school: Olathe (KS) North
- College: North Dakota State
- NFL draft: 2014: undrafted

Career history

Playing
- Washington Redskins (2014)*; Montreal Alouettes (2014–2015)*
- * Offseason or practice squad member only

Coaching
- North Dakota State (2016) Defensive assistant; North Dakota State (2017) Cornerbacks coach; Syracuse (2018–2021) Quality control coach; Montana State (2022–present) Cornerbacks coach

Awards and highlights
- 5× FCS national champion (2011–2013, 2017, 2025)

Bryan Shepherd (born March 2, 1991) is an American college football coach and former cornerback. He is the cornerbacks coach for Montana State University, a position he has held since 2022. He played college football at North Dakota State University. Originally, he collegiately played for the University of Nebraska Omaha before transferring. The Washington Redskins signed him in 2014 after going unselected in the 2014 NFL draft.

== College career ==
Shepherd attended North Dakota State University from 2011 to 2013.

== Professional career ==
=== Washington Redskins ===
The Washington Redskins signed Shepherd as an undrafted free agent on May 14, 2014. The Redskins released Shepherd on August 25, 2014.

=== Montreal Alouettes ===
Shepherd was signed to the Montreal Alouettes' practice roster on October 4, 2014.

== Coaching career ==
In 2016, Shepherd was hired as a defensive assistant for North Dakota State. In 2017, he was promoted to cornerbacks coach.

In 2018, Shepherd was hired as a quality control coach for Syracuse.

In 2022, Shepherd was hired as the cornerbacks coach for Montana State.
