= Matt Veldman =

American football player (born 1988)

No. 85
- Position: Tight end

Personal information
- Born: August 12, 1988 (age 38); Becker, Minnesota, U.S.
- Listed height: 6 ft 7 in (2.01 m)
- Listed weight: 255 lb (116 kg)

Career information
- High school: Becker
- College: North Dakota State (2007–2011)
- NFL draft: 2012: undrafted

Career history
- Jacksonville Jaguars (2012); Detroit Lions (2013)*; Tampa Bay Buccaneers (2013)*; Detroit Lions (2013); Washington Redskins (2014)*
- * Offseason or practice squad member only

Awards and highlights
- FCS national champion (2011)
- Stats at Pro Football Reference

Matt Veldman (born August 12, 1988) is an American former professional football player who was a tight end in the National Football League (NFL). He played college football for the North Dakota State Bison and was signed by the Jacksonville Jaguars as an undrafted free agent in 2012. His younger brother Michael Veldman is the former quarterback for Gustavus Adolphus College.

== Professional career ==
=== Jacksonville Jaguars ===
Veldman signed with the Jacksonville Jaguars following the 2012 NFL draft as a rookie free agent. He spent the entire 2012 season on injured reserve. On June 11, 2013, he was released to make room on the roster for QB Mike Kafka.

=== Detroit Lions ===
Veldman signed with the Detroit Lions on June 17, 2013. He played in one career NFL game. He was released from the Lions on August 27, 2013. After spending time on the Tampa Bay Buccaneers practice squad, Veldman re-signed with the Lions practice squad on December 19, 2013.

=== Washington Redskins ===
Veldman was signed by the Washington Redskins on August 14, 2014. The Redskins waived Veldman on August 26, 2014.
