= Sgt. York Trophy =

Tennessee State	UT Martin
- Originated: 2007
- Current holder: UT Martin
APSU (3); 2017; 2018; 2019	TSU (5); 2007; 2008; 2011; 2012; 2013	TTU (4); 2009; 2020; 2024; 2025	UTM (8); 2010; 2014; 2015; 2016; 2021; 2022; 2023; 2026

Locations in Tennessee

The Sgt. York Trophy is a trophy which goes to the winner of the two Ohio Valley Conference football-playing schools located in the state of Tennessee – Tennessee State University and the University of Tennessee at Martin. The trophy is named for Alvin York, a leading American war hero of World War I and a native of Tennessee.

== History ==
The Nashville Sports Council and the Ohio Valley Conference announced the creation of the trophy in July 2007. In 2014, Delta Dental of Tennessee became the presenting sponsor of the Trophy. In 2022, Austin Peay left the Ohio Valley Conference and moved to the ASUN Conference. With this move and no future matchups scheduled, Austin Peay is currently no longer competing for the Sgt. York Trophy. On August 13, 2025, the Southern Conference announced Tennessee Tech will be joining effective July 1, 2026. Tennessee Tech has no future matchups scheduled and is no longer competing for the trophy. On October 7, 2026, the Ohio Valley Conference announced that Legends Bank has been named the presenting sponsor of the Sgt. York Trophy and that the remaining two teams in Tennessee playing in the Ohio Valley Conference, Tennessee State and UT Martin, will compete annually for the Sgt. York trophy.

== Results ==
Austin Peay victories	Tennessee State victories	Tennessee Tech victories	UT Martin victories

Year	Winner	Summary	APSU vs. TSU	APSU vs. TTU	APSU vs. UTM	TSU vs. TTU	TSU vs. UTM	TTU vs. UTM
2007	Tennessee State†	TSU 2–1, APSU 2–1, TTU 1–2, UTM 1–2	TSU 33–32^{OT}	APSU 30–27	APSU 17–14	TSU 45–28	UTM 43–38	TTU 13–10
2008	Tennessee State	TSU 3–0, UTM 2–1, APSU 1–2, TTU 0–3	No. 21 TSU 37–34	APSU 31–28	UTM 31–17	TSU 41–14	TSU 30–27^{OT}	UTM 35–7
2009	Tennessee Tech	TTU 3–0, UTM 2–1, APSU 1–2, TSU 0–3	APSU 24–21	TTU 31–23	UTM 48–38	TTU 20–13	UTM 28–7	TTU 35–28
2010	UT Martin	UTM 3–0, TTU 2–1, APSU 1–2, TSU 0–3	APSU 26–23	TTU 34–21	UTM 28–12	TTU 21–10	UTM 37–0	UTM 27–24
2011	Tennessee State†	TSU 2–1, TTU 2–1, UTM 1–2, APSU 1–2	APSU 37–34	No. 23 TTU 49–7	UTM 61–23	TSU 42–40	TSU 35–30	TTU 34–31
2012	Tennessee State†	TSU 2–1, UTM 2–1, APSU 1–2, TTU 1–2	TSU 34–14	APSU 38–31	UTM 31–6	No. 21 TSU 22–21	UTM 35–26	TTU 45–44^{OT}
2013	Tennessee State	TSU 3–0, UTM 2–1, TTU 1–2, APSU 0–3	TSU 31–6	TTU 34–0	UTM 38–14	TSU 41–21	No. 24 TSU 29–15	UTM 28–17
2014	UT Martin	UTM 3–0, TSU 2–1, TTU 1–2, APSU 0–3	TSU 31–27	TTU 41–15	UTM 37–7	No. 20 TSU 10–7	UTM 21–16	UTM 17–10
2015	UT Martin	UTM 3–0, TTU 2–1, TSU 1–2, APSU 0–3	TSU 20–6	TTU 42–24	UTM 44–14	TTU 30–24	UTM 28–14	UTM 31–17
2016	UT Martin†	UTM 2–1, TTU 2–1, TSU 2–1, APSU 0–3	TSU 41–40	TTU 41–7	UTM 45–31	TTU 44–16	TSU 34–30	UTM 44–23
2017	Austin Peay	APSU 3–0, UTM 2–1, TTU 1–2, TSU 0–3	APSU 21–17	APSU 35–28	APSU 7–0	TTU 30–26	No. 24 UTM 31–16	UTM 24–0
2018	Austin Peay†	APSU 2–1, TSU 2–1, UTM 2–1, TTU 0–3	APSU 49–34	APSU 41–10	UTM 37–7	TSU 41–14	TSU 31–28^{OT}	UTM 38–13
2019	Austin Peay†	APSU 2–1, UTM 2–1, TSU 2–1, TTU 0–3	TSU 26–24	APSU 58–21	APSU 38–24	TSU 37–27	UTM 28–17	UTM 55–14
2020	Tennessee Tech†	TTU 2–1, UTM 2–1, APSU 1–2, TSU 1–2	APSU 27–20	TTU 27–21	UTM 37–34	TTU 24–10	TSU 26–24	UTM 40–7
2021	UT Martin	UTM 3–0, APSU 2–1, TSU 1–2, TTU 0–3	APSU 36–7	APSU 48–20	No. 13 UTM 17–16	TSU 20–13^{OT}	No. 15 UTM 41–20	No. 13 UTM 42–3

Tennessee State victories	Tennessee Tech victories	UT Martin victories

Year	Winner	Summary	TSU vs. TTU	TSU vs. UTM	TTU vs. UTM
2022	UT Martin	UTM 2–0, TSU 1–1, TTU 0–2	TSU 30–14	UTM 20–3	No. 15 UTM 45–28
2023	UT Martin	UTM 2–0, TTU 1–1, TSU 0–2	TTU 35–0	No. 22 UTM 20–10	No. 21 UTM 44–41^{OT}
2024	Tennessee Tech	TTU 2–0, UTM 1–1, TSU 0–2	TTU 24–14	UTM 28–21	TTU 10–9
2025	Tennessee Tech	TTU 2–0, UTM 1–1, TSU 0–2	No. 13 TTU 35–8	UTM 26–7	No. 6 TTU 20–17

†Won trophy on tiebreaker (In the trophy's first year, 2007, the tiebreaker was head-to-head play. In subsequent years, the previous winner will retain the trophy if they are part of the tie. If the tie is between two other institutions, the trophy will go to the institution that has gone the most seasons without winning the trophy.)

Tennessee State victories	UT Martin victories

Year	Winner	TSU vs. UTM
2026	UT Martin	UTM 42–28

- 2026 game played at Nissan Stadium in Nashville.

== Records ==
Team	Trophies	W	L	Winning %
UT Martin	8	39	15	.722
Tennessee State	5	24	29	.453
Tennessee Tech	4	23	31	.426
Austin Peay	3	17	28	.378

== See also ==
- Beehive Boot
- Commander-in-Chief's Trophy
- Florida Cup
- Michigan MAC Trophy
