= Coughlin–Alumni Stadium =

Former stadium at South Dakota State University

Coordinates: 44°19′15″N 96°46′48″W

- Interactive map of Coughlin–Alumni Stadium
- Location: N Campus Dr and Stadium Rd; Brookings, South Dakota 57007
- Owner: South Dakota State University
- Operator: South Dakota State University
- Capacity: 15,000 (1962–2014); 16,700 (2015)
- Surface: Grass

Construction
- Groundbreaking: 1961
- Opened: September 22, 1962
- Closed: November 7, 2015
- Demolished: 2016

Tenant
- South Dakota State Jackrabbits (NCAA) (1962–2015)

Coughlin–Alumni Stadium was a stadium in Brookings, South Dakota, United States, on the campus of South Dakota State University. It was the home venue of the South Dakota State Jackrabbits football team. The stadium opened in 1962. Demolition of the stadium began on November 9, 2015. Capacity at the time of its closing was 16,700 spectators.

- New stadium - In 2014, a proposal for a new football stadium was approved, and construction began on Dana J. Dykhouse Stadium, which was built in two phases on the site of Coughlin–Alumni Stadium. New seating on the east and south sides of the stadium was completed for the opening of the 2015 season, which increased seating capacity from the original 15,000. Following the 2015 season, the main grandstand of Coughlin–Alumni Stadium was torn down to make way for completion of the new west grandstand, press tower, and a new playing field with artificial turf. The new stadium was completed by the beginning of the 2016 season.
