= List of Presbyterian Blue Hose football seasons =

The Presbyterian Blue Hose football team competes in the National Collegiate Athletic Association (NCAA) Division I Football Championship Subdivision, representing Presbyterian College, located in Clinton, South Carolina. Presbyterian's first football team competed in 1913, and they have fielded a team every year since.

== Seasons ==
| Year | Team | Overall | Conference | Standing | Bowl/playoffs | Coaches^{#} | AP^{°} |
|---|---|---|---|---|---|---|---|
Everett Booe (Independent) (1913)
| 1913 | Presbyterian | 5–3 | | | | | |
Erling Theller (Independent) (1914)
| 1914 | Presbyterian | 4–1–1 | | | | | |
Walter A. Johnson (Independent) (1915–1917)
| 1915 | Presbyterian | 4–4 | | | | | |
| 1916 | Presbyterian | 4–3 | | | | | |
| 1917 | Presbyterian | 8–1 | | | | | |
Gifford Shaw (Independent) (1918)
| 1918 | Presbyterian | 2–0 | | | | | |
Walter A. Johnson (Independent) (1919–1921)
| 1919 | Presbyterian | 4–3–2 | | | | | |
| 1920 | Presbyterian | 5–1–1 | | | | | |
| 1921 | Presbyterian | 1–7 | | | | | |
Walter A. Johnson (Southern Intercollegiate Athletic Association) (1922–1940)
| 1922 | Presbyterian | 6–2–1 | 2–0 | T–2nd | | | |
| 1923 | Presbyterian | 4–3–1 | 2–1–1 | T–6th | | | |
| 1924 | Presbyterian | 1–6–1 | 1–3 | T–14th | | | |
| 1925 | Presbyterian | 3–6 | 2–4 | T–14th | | | |
| 1926 | Presbyterian | 7–2 | 5–1 | 3rd | | | |
| 1927 | Presbyterian | 3–3–3 | 2–2–1 | T–9th | | | |
| 1928 | Presbyterian | 4–6 | 2–5 | 23rd | | | |
| 1929 | Presbyterian | 4–4–1 | 3–3 | T–16th | | | |
| 1930 | Presbyterian | 9–1 | 6–0 | 1st | | | |
| 1931 | Presbyterian | 2–5–2 | 1–4–1 | T–24th | | | |
| 1932 | Presbyterian | 5–2–1 | 3–1–1 | 10th | | | |
| 1933 | Presbyterian | 4–2–2 | 3–2 | T–11th | | | |
| 1934 | Presbyterian | 3–4–2 | 3–2–1 | T–14th | | | |
| 1935 | Presbyterian | 2–7 | 2–4 | T–22nd | | | |
| 1936 | Presbyterian | 3–6 | 3–2 | T–14th | | | |
| 1937 | Presbyterian | 0–10 | 0–3 | T–29th | | | |
| 1938 | Presbyterian | 6–4 | 6–1 | T–5th | | | |
| 1939 | Presbyterian | 4–3–2 | 3–1–2 | T–9th | | | |
| 1940 | Presbyterian | 6–4 | 5–3 | 13th | | | |
Lonnie McMillian (Southern Intercollegiate Athletic Association) (1941)
| 1941 | Presbyterian | 6–3 | – | | | | |
Lonnie McMillian (Independent) (1942–1945)
| 1942 | Presbyterian | 6–4 | | | | | |
| 1943 | Presbyterian | 5–6 | | | | | |
| 1944 | Presbyterian | 3–6 | | | | | |
| 1945 | Presbyterian | 1–6 | | | | | |
Lonnie McMillian (South Carolina Little Three) (1946–1953)
| 1946 | Presbyterian | 7–2 | – | | | | |
| 1947 | Presbyterian | 4–5–1 | – | | | | |
| 1948 | Presbyterian | 5–4 | – | | | | |
| 1949 | Presbyterian | 5–4 | – | | | | |
| 1950 | Presbyterian | 5–5 | – | | | | |
| 1951 | Presbyterian | 5–4 | – | | | | |
| 1952 | Presbyterian | 3–6 | – | | | | |
| 1953 | Presbyterian | 5–3 | – | | | | |
Bill Crutchfield (South Carolina Little Three) (1954–1956)
| 1954 | Presbyterian | 6–3 | 1–1 | 2nd | | | |
| 1955 | Presbyterian | 3–5–1 | 0–2 | 3rd | | | |
| 1956 | Presbyterian | 4–6 | 0–2 | 3rd | | | |
Frank Jones (South Carolina Little Three) (1957–1961)
| 1957 | Presbyterian | 0–8–1 | 0–2 | 3rd | | | |
| 1958 | Presbyterian | 6–3–1 | 2–0 | 1st | | | |
| 1959 | Presbyterian | 9–2 | 2–0 | 1st | L Tangerine | | |
| 1960 | Presbyterian | 6–3 | 2–0 | 1st | | | |
| 1961 | Presbyterian | 3–6–1 | 0–1–1 | T–2nd | | | |
Clyde Ehrhardt (South Carolina Little Three) (1962)
| 1962 | Presbyterian | 1–9 | 1–1 | T–1st | | | |
Cally Gault (South Carolina Little Three) (1963–1964)
| 1963 | Presbyterian | 3–6–1 | 1–1 | 2nd | | | |
| 1964 | Presbyterian | 5–5 | 1–1 | 2nd | | | |
Cally Gault (Carolinas Conference) (1965–1972)
| 1965 | Presbyterian | 5–5 | 1–4 | 7th | | | |
| 1966 | Presbyterian | 6–4 | 5–2 | T–1st | | | |
| 1967 | Presbyterian | 5–4–1 | 4–3 | 4th | | | |
| 1968 | Presbyterian | 7–4 | 5–1 | T–1st | | | |
| 1969 | Presbyterian | 5–6 | 3–2 | 3rd | | | |
| 1970 | Presbyterian | 8–3 | 5–0 | 1st | | | |
| 1971 | Presbyterian | 8–3 | 3–2 | 3rd | | | |
| 1972 | Presbyterian | 7–2–1 | 4–0–1 | T–1st | | | |
Cally Gault (NAIA Division I independent) (1973–1974)
| 1973 | Presbyterian | 3–8 | | | | | |
| 1974 | Presbyterian | 6–5 | | | | | |
Cally Gault (South Atlantic Conference) (1975–1984)
| 1975 | Presbyterian | 3–6–1 | 3–2–1 | 2nd | | | |
| 1976 | Presbyterian | 3–7 | 2–5 | 7th | | | |
| 1977 | Presbyterian | 7–3–1 | 5–2 | T–2nd | | | |
| 1978 | Presbyterian | 8–2–1 | 6–0–1 | T–1st | | | |
| 1979 | Presbyterian | 11–2 | 7–0 | 1st | L NAIA Division I Semifinal | | |
| 1980 | Presbyterian | 4–7 | 3–4 | T–4th | | | |
| 1981 | Presbyterian | 6–5 | 5–2 | 2nd | | | |
| 1982 | Presbyterian | 5–5–1 | 4–2–1 | 5th | | | |
| 1983 | Presbyterian | 5–5–1 | 4–2–1 | 2nd | | | |
| 1984 | Presbyterian | 7–4 | 5–2 | T–2nd | | | |
Elliott Poss (South Atlantic Conference) (1985–1990)
| 1985 | Presbyterian | 7–3–1 | 4–2–1 | T–3rd | | | |
| 1986 | Presbyterian | 5–6 | 3–4 | T–5th | | | |
| 1987 | Presbyterian | 8–5 | 5–2 | 2nd | L NAIA Division I Quarterfinal | | |
| 1988 | Presbyterian | 3–8 | 1–6 | 8th | | | |
| 1989 | Presbyterian | 4–7 | 3–4 | 6th | | | |
| 1990 | Presbyterian | 2–9 | 2–5 | T–6th | | | |
John Perry (South Atlantic Conference) (1991–1996)
| 1991 | Presbyterian | 4–7 | 3–4 | T–4th | | | |
| 1992 | Presbyterian | 4–7 | 3–4 | T–4th | | | |
| 1993 | Presbyterian | 5–6 | 4–3 | T–3rd | | | |
| 1994 | Presbyterian | 5–6 | 2–5 | T–6th | | | |
| 1995 | Presbyterian | 6–5 | 4–3 | T–3rd | | | |
| 1996 | Presbyterian | 5–6 | 4–3 | T–3rd | | | |
Daryl Dickey (South Atlantic Conference) (1997–2000)
| 1997 | Presbyterian | 5–6 | 3–4 | T–5th | | | |
| 1998 | Presbyterian | 8–3 | 6–1 | 2nd | | | |
| 1999 | Presbyterian | 7–4 | 4–4 | T–4th | | | |
| 2000 | Presbyterian | 8–2 | 6–1 | 2nd | | | |
Tommy Spangler (South Atlantic Conference) (2001–2006)
| 2001 | Presbyterian | 7–4 | 5–2 | T–2nd | | | |
| 2002 | Presbyterian | 8–3 | 5–2 | 3rd | | | |
| 2003 | Presbyterian | 4–6 | 2–5 | T–5th | | | |
| 2004 | Presbyterian | 6–5 | 4–3 | T–2nd | | | |
| 2005 | Presbyterian | 10–2 | 7–0 | 1st | L NCAA Division II Second Round | | |
| 2006 | Presbyterian | 7–4 | 5–2 | T–2nd | | | |
Bobby Bentley (Big South Conference) (2007–2008)
| 2007 | Presbyterian | 6–5 | 0–0 | ineligible | | | |
| 2008 | Presbyterian | 4–8 | 0–0 | ineligible | | | |
Harold Nichols (Big South Conference) (2009–2016)
| 2009 | Presbyterian | 0–11 | 0–6 | Ineligible | | | |
| 2010 | Presbyterian | 2–9 | 1–5 | 7th | | | |
| 2011 | Presbyterian | 4–7 | 3–3 | T–3rd | | | |
| 2012 | Presbyterian | 2–9 | 0–6 | 7th | | | |
| 2013 | Presbyterian | 3–8 | 1–4 | T–5th | | | |
| 2014 | Presbyterian | 6–5 | 3–2 | T–3rd | | | |
| 2015 | Presbyterian | 2–9 | 1–5 | 7th | | | |
| 2016 | Presbyterian | 2–9 | 1–4 | 5th | | | |
Tommy Spangler (Big South Conference) (2017–2021)
| 2017 | Presbyterian | 4–7 | 1–4 | 5th | | | |
| 2018 | Presbyterian | 2–8 | 0–5 | 6th | | | |
| 2019 | Presbyterian | 2–10 | 1–5 | T-5th | | | |
| 2020 | Presbyterian | 4–3 | 4–2 | T-2nd | | | |
Kevin Kelley (Pioneer League) (2021)
| 2021 | Presbyterian | 2–9 | 0–8 | 11th | | | |
Steve Englehart (Pioneer League) (2022–2025)
| 2022 | Presbyterian | 1–10 | 0–8 | 11th | | | |
| 2023 | Presbyterian | 4–7 | 2–6 | T-8th | | | |
| 2024 | Presbyterian | 6–6 | 4–4 | T-6th | | | |
| 2025 | Presbyterian | 10–2 | 6–2 | T-2nd | | | |
Matt Rahl (Pioneer League) (2026–present)
| 2026 | Presbyterian | 0–0 | 0–0 | | | | |
| Total: | | | | | | | |
National championship Conference title Conference division title or championship game berth
^{†}Indicates Bowl Coalition, Bowl Alliance, BCS, or CFP / New Years' Six bowl.; ^{#}Rankings from final Coaches Poll.
