= List of Presbyterian Blue Hose head football coaches =

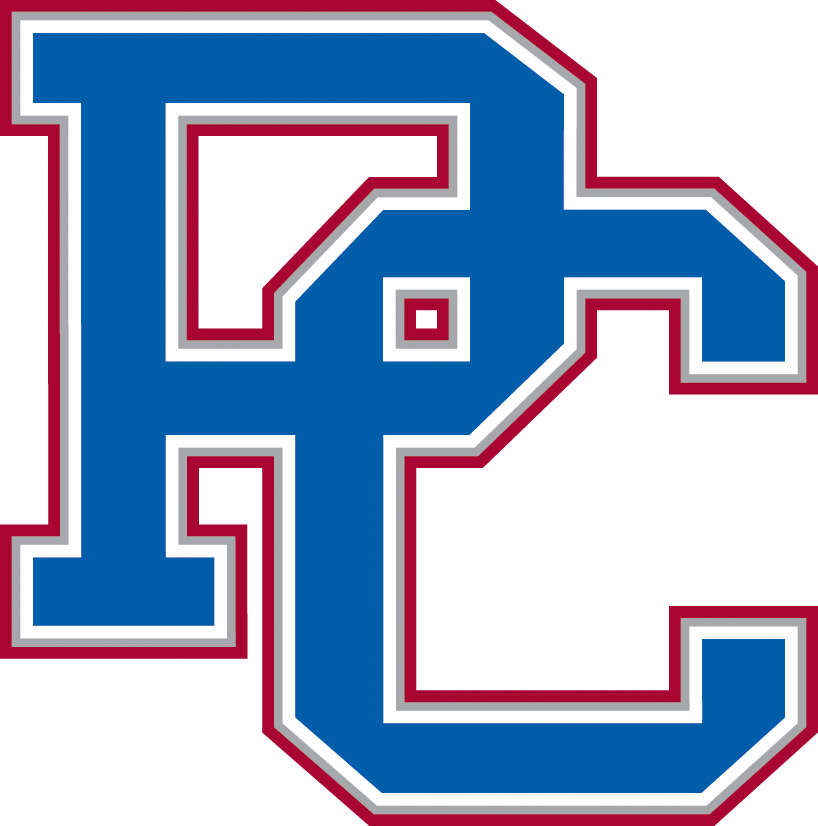
The Presbyterian Blue Hose logo.

The Presbyterian Blue Hose football college football team represents Presbyterian College, currently an FCS independent. The Blue Hose currently compete as a member of the National Collegiate Athletic Association (NCAA) Division I Football Championship Subdivision. The program has had 15 different head coaches since it began play during the 1913 season.

Presbyterian has played 1,052 games over 104 seasons, appearing in 1 bowl game (1960 Tangerine Bowl). The team's 1,000th game was against Gardner–Webb, the last game of the 2013 season. They lost, 13–20.

== Key ==
Key to symbols in coaches list
General		Overall		Conference		Postseason (Note: Although the first Rose Bowl Game was played in 1902, it has been continuously played since the 1916 game, and is recognized as the oldest bowl game by the NCAA. "—" indicates any season prior to 1916 when postseason games were not played.)	
No.	Order of coaches (Note: A running total of the number of head coaches, with coaches who served separate tenures being counted only once. Interim head coaches are represented with "Int" and are not counted in the running total. "—" indicates the team played but either without a coach or no coach is on record. "X" indicates an interim year without play.)	GC	Games coached	CW	Conference wins	PW	Postseason wins
DC	Division championships	OW	Overall wins	CL	Conference losses	PL	Postseason losses
CC	Conference championships	OL	Overall losses	CT	Conference ties	PT	Postseason ties
NC	National championships	OT	Overall ties (Note: Overtime rules in college football were introduced in 1996, making ties impossible in the period since.)	C%	Conference winning percentage		
†	Elected to the College Football Hall of Fame	O%	Overall winning percentage (Note: When computing the win–loss percentage, a tie counts as half a win and half a loss.)				

== Coaches ==
List of head football coaches showing season(s) coached, overall records, conference records, postseason records, championships and selected awards (Note: Statistics correct as of the end of the 2025 NCAA Division I FCS football season.)
No.	Name	Season(s)	GC	OW	OL	OT	O%	CW	CL	CT	C%	PW	PL	PT	DC	CC	NC	Awards
1	Everett Booe	1913	8	5	3	0	0.625	—	—	—	—	—	—	—	—	—	0	
2	Erling Theller	1914	6	4	1	1	0.750	—	—	—	—	—	—	—	—	—	0	
3	Walter Johnson	1915–1917, 1919–1940	224	101	104	19	0.493	—	—	—	—	—	—	—	—	—	0	
4	Gifford Shaw	1918	2	2	0	0	1.000	—	—	—	—	—	—	—	—	—	0	
5	Lonnie McMillian	1941–1953	121	61	58	2	0.625	—	—	—	—	—	—	—	—	—	0	
6	Bill Crutchfield	1954–1956	28	13	14	1	0.482	—	—	—	—	—	—	—	—	—	0	
7	Frank Jones	1957–1961	49	24	22	3	0.520	—	—	—	—	0	1	0	—	—	0	
8	Clyde Ehrhardt	1962	10	1	9	0	0.100	—	—	—	—	—	—	—	—	—	0	
9	Cally Gault	1963–1984	234	126	100	8	0.556	44	19	4	0.687	—	—	—	—	—	0	
10	Elliott Poss	1985–1990	67	29	37	1	0.440	18	23	1	0.440	—	—	—	—	—	0	
11	John Perry	1991–1996	66	29	37	—	0.440	21	25	—	0.456	—	—	—	—	—	0	
12	Daryl Dickey	1997–2000	43	28	15	—	0.651	21	12	—	0.636	—	—	—	—	—	0	
13	Tommy Spangler	2001–2006, 2017–2020	106	54	52	—	0.509	34	20	—	0.630	—	—	—	—	—	0	
14	Bobby Bentley	2007–2008	23	10	13	—	0.435	—	—	—	—	—	—	—	—	—	0	
15	Harold Nichols	2009–2016	88	21	67	—	0.239	10	34	—	0.227	—	—	—	—	—	0	
16	Kevin Kelley	2021	11	2	9	—	0.182	0	8	—	.000	—	—	—	—	—	0	
17	Steve Englehart	2022–2025	46	21	25	—	0.457	12	20	—	0.375	—	—	—	—	—	0	
18	Matt Rahl	2026–present	0	0	0	—	–	0	0	—	–	—	—	—	—	—	0	
