= 2011 Coastal Carolina Chanticleers football team =

American college football season

2011 Coastal Carolina Chanticleers football
- Conference: Big South Conference
- Record: 7–4 (3–3 Big South)
- Head coach: David Bennett (9th season)
- Offensive coordinator: Kevin Brown (3rd season)
- Offensive scheme: Multiple
- Defensive coordinator: Curtis Walker (9th season)
- Base defense: 4–3
- Home stadium: Brooks Stadium

2011 Big South Conference football standings
	Conf.			Overall
Team	W		L	W		L
No. 18 Stony Brook $^	6	–	0	9	–	4
No. 25 Liberty	5	–	1	7	–	4
Coastal Carolina	3	–	3	7	–	4
Presbyterian	3	–	3	4	–	7
Gardner–Webb	2	–	4	4	–	7
VMI	2	–	4	2	–	9
Charleston Southern	0	–	6	0	–	11
$ – Conference champion; ^ – FCS playoff participant; Rankings from The Sports Network poll

The 2011 Coastal Carolina Chanticleers football team represented Coastal Carolina University as a member of the Big South Conference during the 2011 NCAA Division I FCS football season. Led by ninth-year head coach David Bennett, the Chanticleers compiled an overall record of 7–4 with a mark of 3–3 in conference play, tying for third place the Big South. Coastal Carolina played home games at Brooks Stadium in Conway, South Carolina.

== Schedule ==
Date	Time	Opponent	Site	TV	Result	Attendance
September 3	6:00 pm	Furman*	Brooks Stadium; Conway, SC		W 30–23	8,633
September 10	6:00 pm	Catawba*	Brooks Stadium; Conway, SC		W 20–3	7,977
September 17	1:00 pm	at Georgia*	Sanford Stadium; Athens, GA	ESPN3	L 0–59	91,946
September 24	4:00 pm	at North Carolina A&T*	Aggie Stadium; Greensboro, NC		W 31–14	9,709
October 8	6:00 pm	VMI	Brooks Stadium; Conway, SC		W 34–10	7,733
October 15	3:30 pm	at Liberty	Williams Stadium; Lynchburg, VA (rivalry)		L 27–63	19,111
October 22	6:00 pm	Gardner–Webb^{†}	Brooks Stadium; Conway, SC		L 24–26	8,557
October 29	4:00 pm	at Stony Brook	Kenneth P. LaValle Stadium; Stony Brook, NY		L 0–42	1,619
November 5	6:00 pm	Presbyterian	Brooks Stadium; Conway, SC		W 15–8	8,927
November 12	1:30 pm	at Charleston Southern	Buccaneer Field; Charleston, SC		W 45–38	2,933
November 19	2:00 pm	at Western Carolina*	Bob Waters Field at E. J. Whitmire Stadium; Cullowhee, NC		W 45–21	5,201
*Non-conference game; ^{†}Homecoming; All times are in Eastern time
