= Ron Dickerson Jr. =

American football player and coach (born 1971)

Current position
- Title: Head coach
- Team: Benedict
- Conference: SIAC
- Record: 14–9

Biographical details
- Born: August 31, 1971 (age 55); Denver, Colorado, U.S.

Playing career
- 1989–1992: Arkansas
- 1993–1994: Kansas City Chiefs
- 1995: Philadelphia Eagles
- 1996–1997: Scottish Claymores
- 1997: London Monarchs
- Positions: Running back, wide receiver

Coaching career (HC unless noted)
- 1996–1997: Temple (assistant)
- 1998–1999: Alabama State (WR)
- 2001: Las Vegas Outlaws (RB)
- 2001: Tampa Bay Buccaneers (intern)
- 2002–2004: Missouri State (WR)
- 2005–2007: Louisiana–Monroe (WR)
- 2008–2010: Ole Miss (WR)
- 2011–2012: Gardner–Webb
- 2017–2018: Morgan State (WR/ST)
- 2019: Jackson State (OC)
- 2020: Jackson State (ST)
- 2021–2022: West Florida (DFO/WR)
- 2023: West Florida (OC/WR)
- 2024–present: Benedict

Head coaching record
- Overall: 21–24
- Tournaments: 0–1 (NCAA D-II Playoffs)

Ronald Lee Dickerson Jr. (born August 31, 1971) is an American football coach and former player. He is the head football coach for Benedict College, a position he has held since 2024. He was the head football coach at Gardner–Webb University, a position he held from January 2011 to January 2013. Dickerson was the first African-American head football coach in the history of the Big South Conference. He resigned from Gardner–Webb on January 18, 2013 to pursue other opportunities. He is the son of Ron Dickerson.

== College career ==
Dickerson Jr. was recruited by Ken Hatfield to play running back at the University of Arkansas, where he went to school from 1989 to 1992. His freshman year he helped Arkansas win the Southwest Conference (SWC) championship and play in the 1990 Cotton Bowl Classic, finishing 10–2. Hatfield left Arkansas after the 1989 season and he was replaced by offensive coordinator Jack Crowe. After a dismal 3–8 season in 1990 that saw Dickerson Jr. gain 362 yards rushing, he was moved to wide receiver for his junior season in 1991. That year he caught 25 passes for 372 yards and 3 touchdowns, helping the Razorbacks to a 6–6 record and an appearance in the 1991 Independence Bowl. During his senior season of 1992, Arkansas would leave the Southwest Conference to their new home in the Southeastern Conference (SEC). His head coach, Crowe, was fired by then Arkansas athletics director Frank Broyles after losing the season opener at home to Division I-AA The Citadel, 10–3. Joe Kines, the defensive coordinator of the team, took over as interim head coach, and Arkansas would finish their first, and very tumultuous, season in the SEC with a 3–7–1 record. The highlight of the season was an upset victory in Knoxville over then-No. 4 Tennessee 25–24, where Dickerson Jr. would have his best season statistically in 1992, catching 32 passes for 437 yards and 4 TDs.

== Professional playing career ==
Dickerson played for the Kansas City Chiefs from 1993 to 1994 as a kick returner. He also played two seasons in the World League for the Scottish Claymores and the London Monarchs.

== Head coaching record ==
| Year | Team | Overall | Conference | Standing | Bowl/playoffs | AFCA^{#} | D2^{°} |
|---|---|---|---|---|---|---|---|
Gardner–Webb Runnin' Bulldogs (Big South Conference) (2011–2012)
| 2011 | Gardner–Webb | 4–7 | 2–4 | T–5th | | | |
| 2012 | Gardner–Webb | 3–8 | 2–4 | 5th | | | |
| Gardner–Webb: | | 7–15 | 4–8 | | | | |
Benedict Tigers (Southern Intercollegiate Athletic Conference) (2024–present)
| 2024 | Benedict | 4–6 | 4–4 | T–6th | | | |
| 2025 | Benedict | 10–3 | 7–1 | T–2nd | L NCAA Division II Second Round | 20 | 22 |
| 2026 | Benedict | 0–0 | 0–0 | | | | |
| Benedict: | | 14–9 | 11–5 | | | | |
| Total: | | 21–24 | | | | | |
