= Harold Nichols (American football) =

American football player and coach (born 1967)

Biographical details
- Born: November 26, 1967 (age 58); New Smyrna Beach, Florida, U.S.

Playing career
- 1987–1989: Presbyterian
- Position: Quarterback

Coaching career (HC unless noted)
- 1990–1991: Presbyterian (assistant)
- 1992–1996: Georgia Southern (GA)
- 1997–1999: Presbyterian (WR/K)
- 2000–2005: Rhode Island (OC)
- 2006–2007: Rhode Island (AHC/OC)
- 2008: Bucknell (OC)
- 2009–2016: Presbyterian

Head coaching record
- Overall: 21–67

Harold Nichols (born November 26, 1967) is an American football coach and former player. He was the head football coach at Presbyterian College in Clinton, South Carolina, from 2009 to 2016. Nichols played college football as a quarterback at Presbyterian from 1987 to 1989. He has worked an assistant football coach at Georgia Southern University, the University of Rhode Island, Bucknell University, and his alma mater, Presbyterian.

== Playing career ==
Nichols played quarterback for head coach Elliott Poss at Presbyterian College before graduating in 1989 as a political science major. He threw for 3,688 yards in his three seasons as Blue Hose quarterback.

== Coaching career ==
Nichols was an assistant at PC for quarterbacks and running backs in his first two years as a collegiate coach under head coach John Perry. Then he spent five years as an assistant coach and recruiting coordinator at I-AA powerhouse Georgia Southern University. In 1997, he began a three-year stay back at Presbyterian as wide receivers coach and recruiting coordinator for head coach Daryl Dickey. In 2000, he began an eight-year run as associate head coach and offensive coordinator at the University of Rhode Island. He then spent a season as offensive coordinator at Bucknell University before getting his first crack at being a head coach after 18 years as an assistant.

On January 14, 2009, Nichols was hired as head football coach of the Blue Hose, succeeding Bobby Bentley. He took over a team transitioning into NCAA Division I Football Championship Subdivision (FCS) as a member of the Big South Conference. This was his third stint as a football coach at his alma mater. He resigned on November 20, 2016, a day after the team's ninth regular season loss and after eight seasons at the helm of the team, going 21–67.

== Head coaching record ==
Year	Team	Overall	Conference	Standing	Bowl/playoffs
Presbyterian Blue Hose (Big South Conference) (2009–2016)
2009	Presbyterian	0–11	0–6	Ineligible	
2010	Presbyterian	2–9	1–5	7th	
2011	Presbyterian	4–7	3–3	T–3rd	
2012	Presbyterian	2–9	0–6	7th	
2013	Presbyterian	3–8	1–4	T–5th	
2014	Presbyterian	6–5	3–2	T–3rd	
2015	Presbyterian	2–9	1–5	7th	
2016	Presbyterian	2–9	1–4	5th	
Presbyterian:		21–67	10–34		
Total:		21–67			
