= 2011 Liberty Flames football team =

American college football season

2011 Liberty Flames football
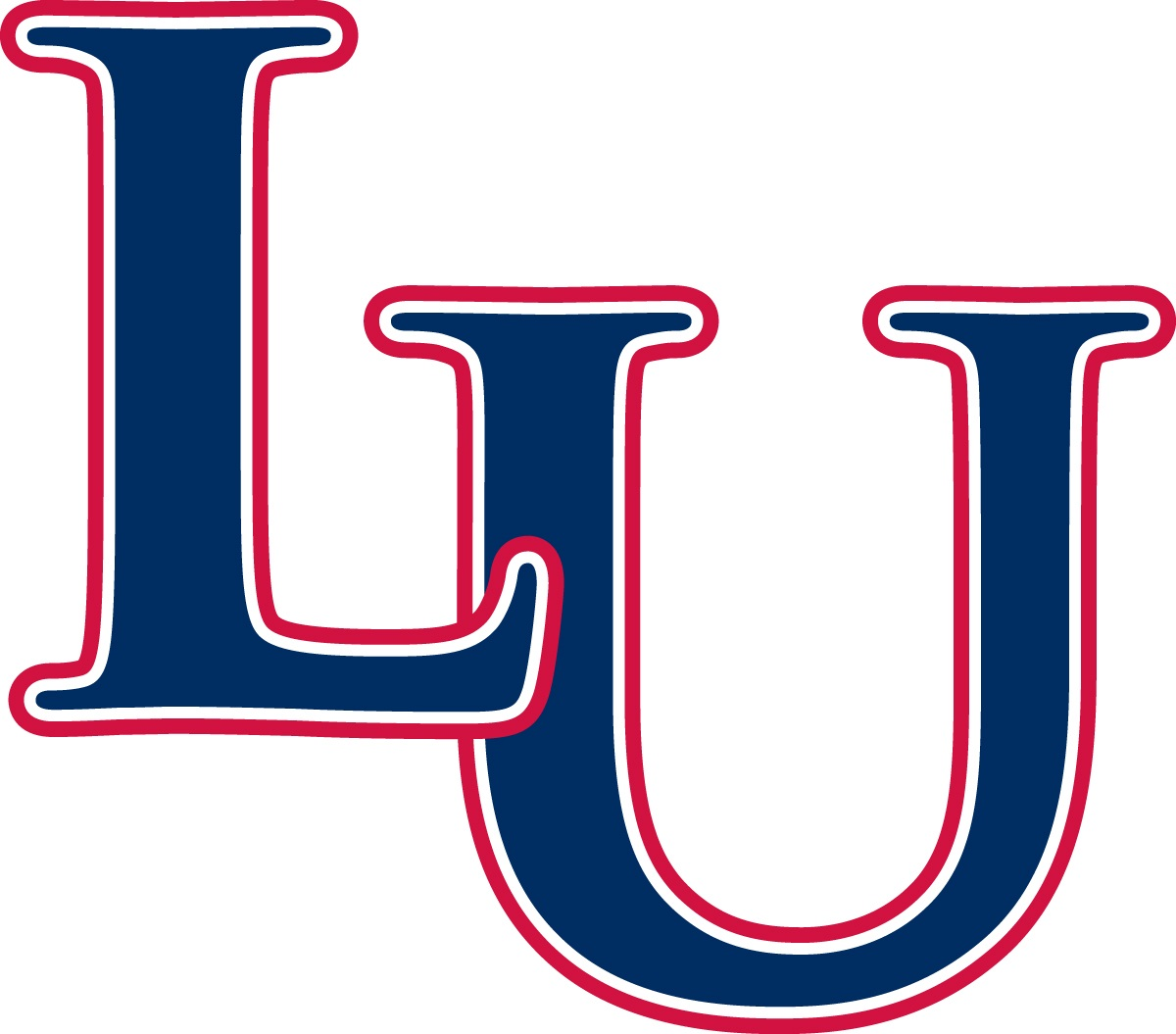
- Conference: Big South Conference

Ranking
- Sports Network: No. 24
- FCS Coaches: No. 23
- Record: 7–4 (5–1 Big South)
- Head coach: Danny Rocco (6th season)
- Offensive coordinator: Brandon Streeter (3rd as OC, 6th overall season)
- Defensive coordinator: Tom Clark (6th season)
- Home stadium: Williams Stadium

2011 Big South Conference football standings
	Conf.			Overall
Team	W		L	W		L
No. 18 Stony Brook $^	6	–	0	9	–	4
No. 25 Liberty	5	–	1	7	–	4
Coastal Carolina	3	–	3	7	–	4
Presbyterian	3	–	3	4	–	7
Gardner–Webb	2	–	4	4	–	7
VMI	2	–	4	2	–	9
Charleston Southern	0	–	6	0	–	11
$ – Conference champion; ^ – FCS playoff participant; Rankings from The Sports Network poll

The 2011 Liberty Flames football team represented Liberty University in the 2011 NCAA Division I FCS football season. The Flames were led by sixth-year head coach Danny Rocco and played their home games at Williams Stadium. They were a member of the Big South Conference. They finished the season 7–4, 5–1 in Big South play to finish in second place.

== Schedule ==
Date	Time	Opponent	Rank	Site	TV	Result	Attendance
September 3	6:00 pm	at NC State*	No. 22	Carter–Finley Stadium; Raleigh, NC	ESPN3	L 21–43	56,564
September 10	7:00 pm	Robert Morris*	No. 24	Williams Stadium; Lynchburg, VA	ESPN3	W 38–7	15,805
September 17	7:00 pm	No. 13 James Madison*	No. 22	Williams Stadium; Lynchburg, VA	FSN/ESPN3	L 24–27	18,878
September 24	12:30 pm	at No. 15 Lehigh*		Goodman Stadium; Bethlehem, PA	FSN/ESPN3	L 24–27	6,185
October 1	7:00 pm	Kentucky Wesleyan*		Williams Stadium; Lynchburg, VA	FSN/ESPN3	W 57–0	15,782
October 8	6:00 pm	at Gardner–Webb		Ernest W. Spangler Stadium; Boiling Springs, NC	FSN/ESPN3	W 35–3	6,253
October 15	3:30 pm	Coastal Carolina^{†}		Williams Stadium; Lynchburg, VA (rivalry)	FSN/ESPN3	W 63–27	19,111
October 22	1:30 pm	at Charleston Southern		Buccaneer Field; Charleston, SC	FSN/ESPN3	W 38–16	3,375
October 29	3:30 pm	Presbyterian	No. 23	Williams Stadium; Lynchburg, VA	FSN/ESPN3	W 27–20 ^{2OT}	11,673
November 5	3:30 pm	VMI	No. 22	Williams Stadium; Lynchburg, VA	FSN/ESPN3	W 37–31	17,266
November 19	1:00 pm	at Stony Brook	No. 16	Kenneth P. LaValle Stadium; Stony Brook, NY	FSN/ESPN3	L 31–41	7,896
*Non-conference game; ^{†}Homecoming; Rankings from The Sports Network Poll released prior to the game; All times are in Eastern time
