= 2011 Charleston Southern Buccaneers football team =

American college football season

2011 Charleston Southern Buccaneers football
- Conference: Big South Conference
- Record: 0–11 (0–6 Big South)
- Head coach: Jay Mills (9th season)
- Offensive coordinator: Patrick Nix (1st season)
- Defensive coordinator: Thielen Smith (4th season)
- Home stadium: Buccaneer Field

2011 Big South Conference football standings
	Conf.			Overall
Team	W		L	W		L
No. 18 Stony Brook $^	6	–	0	9	–	4
No. 25 Liberty	5	–	1	7	–	4
Coastal Carolina	3	–	3	7	–	4
Presbyterian	3	–	3	4	–	7
Gardner–Webb	2	–	4	4	–	7
VMI	2	–	4	2	–	9
Charleston Southern	0	–	6	0	–	11
$ – Conference champion; ^ – FCS playoff participant; Rankings from The Sports Network poll

The 2011 Charleston Southern Buccaneers football team represented Charleston Southern University as a member of the Big South Conference during the 2011 NCAA Division I FCS football season. Led by ninth-year head coach Jay Mills, the Buccaneers compiled an overall record of 0–11 with a mark of 0–6 in conference play, placing last out of seven teams in the Big South. It was the second winless season in program history as the team also went 0–11 in 1994. Charleston Southern played home games at Buccaneer Field in Charleston, South Carolina.

== Schedule ==
Date	Time	Opponent	Site	TV	Result	Attendance
September 3	7:00 pm	at UCF*	Bright House Networks Stadium; Orlando, FL	BHSN	L 0–62	39,752
September 10	6:00 pm	at No. 4 Florida State*	Doak Campbell Stadium; Tallahassee, FL	ESPN3	L 10–62	75,229
September 17	1:00 pm	at Jacksonville*	D. B. Milne Field; Jacksonville, FL		L 30–37	4,185
September 24	1:30 pm	Norfolk State*	Buccaneer Field; Charleston, SC		L 3–33	1,933
October 1	1:30 pm	Wesley*^{†}	Buccaneer Field; Charleston, SC		L 20–32	3,186
October 15	1:30 pm	at VMI	Alumni Memorial Field; Lexington, VA	ESPN3	L 17–21	7,233
October 22	1:30 pm	Liberty	Buccaneer Field; Charleston, SC	WBGR-LP	L 16–38	3,375
October 29	1:30 pm	at Gardner–Webb	Ernest W. Spangler Stadium; Boiling Springs, NC		L 7–14	5,570
November 5	1:30 pm	Stony Brook	Buccaneer Field; Charleston, SC		L 31–50	2,806
November 12	1:30 pm	Coastal Carolina	Buccaneer Field; Charleston, SC		L 38–45	2,933
November 19	1:00 pm	at Presbyterian	Bailey Memorial Stadium; Clinton, SC		L 14–45	4,308
*Non-conference game; ^{†}Homecoming; Rankings from AP Poll released prior to the game; All times are in Eastern time
