= 2011 VMI Keydets football team =

American college football season

2011 VMI Keydets football
- Conference: Big South Conference
- Record: 2–9 (2–4 Big South)
- Head coach: Sparky Woods (4th season)
- Offensive coordinator: Matt Campbell (2nd season)
- Offensive scheme: Pro-style
- Defensive coordinator: A. J. Christoff (4th season)
- Base defense: 4–3
- Home stadium: Alumni Memorial Field

2011 Big South Conference football standings
	Conf.			Overall
Team	W		L	W		L
No. 18 Stony Brook $^	6	–	0	9	–	4
No. 25 Liberty	5	–	1	7	–	4
Coastal Carolina	3	–	3	7	–	4
Presbyterian	3	–	3	4	–	7
Gardner–Webb	2	–	4	4	–	7
VMI	2	–	4	2	–	9
Charleston Southern	0	–	6	0	–	11
$ – Conference champion; ^ – FCS playoff participant; Rankings from The Sports Network poll

The 2011 VMI Keydets football team represented the Virginia Military Institute during the 2011 NCAA Division I FCS football season as a member of the Big South Conference. The 2011 season was the Keydets 121st season overall, and their 9th in the Big South. They finished with a 2–9 overall record and 2–4 in the Big South under 4th year head coach Sparky Woods. They played their games at Alumni Memorial Field, as they have since 1962.

== Schedule ==
Date	Time	Opponent	Site	TV	Result	Attendance
September 3	1:30 pm	Delaware State*	Alumni Memorial Field; Lexington, VA		L 21–24	6,209
September 10	1:30 pm	No. 5 William & Mary*	Alumni Memorial Field; Lexington, VA (rivalry)		L 7–24	5,786
September 17	6:00 pm	at No. 6 Richmond*	E. Claiborne Robins Stadium; Richmond, VA		L 19–34	8,700
September 24	2:00 pm	at Akron*	InfoCision Stadium–Summa Field; Akron, OH		L 13–36	14,257
October 8	6:00 pm	at Coastal Carolina	Brooks Stadium; Conway, SC	MASN	L 10–34	7,733
October 15	1:30 pm	Charleston Southern	Alumni Memorial Field; Lexington, VA	ESPN3	W 21–17	7,233
October 22	1:30 pm	Stony Brook^{†}	Alumni Memorial Field; Lexington, VA		L 14–42	5,142
October 29	1:00 pm	at The Citadel*	Johnson Hagood Stadium; Charleston, SC (The Military Classic of the South)		L 14–41	11,184
November 5	3:30 pm	at No. 22 Liberty	Williams Stadium; Lynchburg, VA	MASN, ESPN3	L 31–37	17,266
November 12	1:00 pm	at Presbyterian	Bailey Memorial Stadium; Clinton, SC		L 6–38	4,003
November 19	1:30 pm	Gardner–Webb	Alumni Memorial Field; Lexington, VA		W 31–24	5,013
*Non-conference game; ^{†}Homecoming; Rankings from The Sports Network Poll released prior to the game

== Game summaries ==
=== Delaware State ===
Quarter	1	2	3	4	Total
Delaware State	6	8	7	3	24
VMI	7	7	0	7	21

at Alumni Memorial Field (Lexington, VA)

- Game time: 1:30 PM
- Game attendance: 6,209
- Referee: Dennis Donovan

=== William & Mary ===
Quarter	1	2	3	4	Total
William & Mary	0	14	7	3	24
VMI	0	0	0	7	7

at Alumni Memorial Stadium (Lexington, VA)

- Game time: 1:30 PM
- Game attendance: 5,786
- Referee: W. Davenport

=== Richmond ===
Quarter	1	2	3	4	Total
VMI	0	0	3	16	19
Richmond	10	17	7	0	34

at Robins Stadium (Richmond, VA)

- Game time: 6:00 PM
- Game attendance: 8,700
- Referee: Paul Zukis

=== Akron ===
Quarter	1	2	3	4	Total
VMI	7	0	0	6	13
Akron	16	13	0	7	36

at InfoCision Stadium – Summa Field (Akron, Ohio)

- Game time: 2:00 PM
- Game attendance: 14,257
- Referee: Don Willard

=== Coastal Carolina ===
Quarter	1	2	3	4	Total
VMI	0	3	0	7	10
Coastal Carolina	7	20	7	0	34

at Brooks Stadium (Conway, SC)

- Game time: 7:00 PM
- Game attendance: 7,733
- Referee: Ron Cherry
- TV: MASN

=== Charleston Southern ===
Quarter	1	2	3	4	Total
Charleston Southern	0	0	3	14	17
VMI	7	7	0	7	21

at Alumni Memorial Field (Lexington, VA)

- Game time: 1:30 PM
- Game attendance: 7233
- Referee: Gary Patterson

=== Stony Brook ===
Homecoming

Quarter	1	2	3	4	Total
Stony Brook	0	7	21	14	42
VMI	0	0	7	7	14

at Alumni Memorial Field (Lexington, VA)

- Game time: 1:30 PM
- Game attendance: 5,142
- Referee: Ron Cherry

=== The Citadel ===
Quarter	1	2	3	4	Total
VMI	7	0	0	7	14
The Citadel	14	7	17	3	41

at Johnson Hagood Stadium (Charleston, SC)

- Game time: 1:00 PM
- Game attendance: 11,184
- Referee: Steve Marlowe

=== Liberty ===
Quarter	1	2	3	4	Total
VMI	7	10	7	7	31
Liberty	9	7	14	7	37

at Williams Stadium (Lynchburg, VA)

- Game time: 3:30 PM
- Game attendance: 17,266
- Referee: J. Magallanes
- TV: MASN

=== Presbyterian ===
Quarter	1	2	3	4	Total
VMI	0	6	0	0	6
Presbyterian	14	10	14	0	38

at Bailey Memorial Stadium (Clinton, SC)

- Game time: 1:00 PM
- Game attendance: 4,003
- Referee: Jeff Heaser

=== Gardner-Webb ===
Quarter	1	2	3	4	Total
Gardner-Webb	0	10	0	14	24
VMI	17	7	0	7	31

at Alumni Memorial Field (Lexington, VA)

- Game time: 1:30 PM
- Game attendance: 5,013
- Referee: Tom McCreesh
