= 2011 Gardner–Webb Runnin' Bulldogs football team =

American college football season

2011 Gardner–Webb Runnin' Bulldogs football
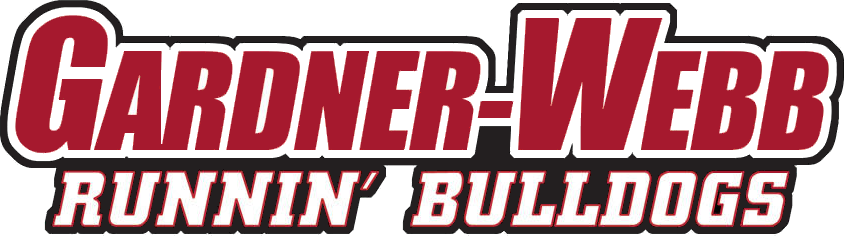
- Conference: Big South Conference
- Record: 4–7 (2–4 Big South)
- Head coach: Ron Dickerson Jr. (1st season)
- Defensive coordinator: Tony Pierce (1st season)
- Home stadium: Ernest W. Spangler Stadium

2011 Big South Conference football standings
| | Conf. | | | Overall |
| Team | W | | L | W | | L |
|---|---|---|---|---|---|---|
| No. 18 Stony Brook $^ | 6 | – | 0 | 9 | – | 4 |
| No. 25 Liberty | 5 | – | 1 | 7 | – | 4 |
| Coastal Carolina | 3 | – | 3 | 7 | – | 4 |
| Presbyterian | 3 | – | 3 | 4 | – | 7 |
| Gardner–Webb | 2 | – | 4 | 4 | – | 7 |
| VMI | 2 | – | 4 | 2 | – | 9 |
| Charleston Southern | 0 | – | 6 | 0 | – | 11 |
$ – Conference champion; ^ – FCS playoff participant; Rankings from The Sports Network poll

The 2011 Gardner–Webb Runnin' Bulldogs football team represented Gardner–Webb University as a member of the Big South Conference during the 2011 NCAA Division I FCS football season. Led by first-year head coach Ron Dickerson Jr., the Runnin' Bulldogs compiled an overall record of 4–7 with a mark of 2–4 in conference play, tying for fifth place in the Big South. Gardner–Webb played home games at Ernest W. Spangler Stadium in Boiling Springs, North Carolina.

== Schedule ==
| Date | Time | Opponent | Site | TV | Result | Attendance |
|---|---|---|---|---|---|---|
| September 3 | 6:00 pm | Brevard* | Ernest W. Spangler Stadium; Boiling Springs, NC | | W 34–17 | 5,133 |
| September 10 | 7:00 pm | at Ohio* | Peden Stadium; Athens, OH | | L 3–30 | 23,155 |
| September 17 | 6:30 pm | at Wake Forest* | BB&T Field; Winston-Salem, NC | ESPN3 | L 5–48 | 28,765 |
| October 1 | 3:00 pm | at Samford* | Seibert Stadium; Homewood, AL | | L 14–41 | 7,726 |
| October 8 | 6:00 pm | Liberty | Ernest W. Spangler Stadium; Boiling Springs, NC | | L 3–35 | 6,253 |
| October 15 | 2:00 pm | at Presbyterian | Bailey Memorial Stadium; Clinton, SC | | L 14–28 | 5,364 |
| October 22 | 6:00 pm | at Coastal Carolina | Brooks Stadium; Conway, SC | | W 26–24 | 8,557 |
| October 29 | 1:30 pm | Charleston Southern^{†} | Ernest W. Spangler Stadium; Boiling Springs, NC | | W 14–7 | 5,570 |
| November 3 | 6:00 pm | Virginia State* | Ernest W. Spangler Stadium; Boiling Springs, NC | | W 34–13 | 1,680 |
| November 12 | 1:30 pm | Stony Brook | Ernest W. Spangler Stadium; Boiling Springs, NC | | L 28–76 | 4,209 |
| November 19 | 1:30 pm | at VMI | Alumni Memorial Field; Lexington, VA | | L 24–31 | 5,013 |
*Non-conference game; ^{†}Homecoming; All times are in Eastern time
