= Cally Gault =

American football coach and college athletics administrator (1927–2019)

Biographical details
- Born: December 22, 1927; Bamberg, South Carolina, U.S.
- Died: April 19, 2019 (aged 91)
- Education: Presbyterian (1948); South Carolina (MS)

Coaching career (HC unless noted)
- 1953–1962: North Augusta HS (SC)
- 1963–1984: Presbyterian

Administrative career (AD unless noted)
- 1963–1994: Presbyterian

Head coaching record
- Overall: 127–101–8 (college)
- Tournaments: 1–1 (NAIA D–I playoffs)

Accomplishments and honors

Championships
- 4 Carolinas Conference (1966, 1968, 1970, 1972); 2 SAC (1978–1979)

Calhoun Folk Gault (December 22, 1927 – April 19, 2019) was an American football coach and college athletics administrator. He served as the head football coach at Presbyterian College in Clinton, South Carolina from 1963 to 1984. He also served as the school's athletic director until his retirement in 1995.

Before he came to Presbyterian, he was a highly successful high school coach at North Augusta High School in North Augusta, South Carolina, winning three state championships.

== Head coaching record ==
=== College ===
Year	Team	Overall	Conference	Standing	Bowl/playoffs
Presbyterian Blue Hose (South Carolina Little Three) (1963–1964)
1963	Presbyterian	3–6–1	1–1	2nd	
1964	Presbyterian	5–5	1–1	2nd	
Presbyterian Blue Hose (Carolinas Conference) (1965–1972)
1965	Presbyterian	5–5	1–4	7th	
1966	Presbyterian	6–4	5–2	T–1st	
1967	Presbyterian	5–4–1	4–3	4th	
1968	Presbyterian	7–4	5–1	T–1st	
1969	Presbyterian	5–6	3–2	3rd	
1970	Presbyterian	8–3	5–0	1st	
1971	Presbyterian	8–3	3–2	3rd	
1972	Presbyterian	7–2–1	4–0–1	T–1st	
Presbyterian Blue Hose (NAIA Division I independent) (1973–1974)
1973	Presbyterian	3–8			
1974	Presbyterian	6–5			
Presbyterian Blue Hose (South Atlantic Conference) (1975–1984)
1975	Presbyterian	3–6–1	3–2–1	2nd	
1976	Presbyterian	3–7	2–5	7th	
1977	Presbyterian	7–3–1	5–2	T–2nd	
1978	Presbyterian	8–2–1	6–0–1	T–1st	
1979	Presbyterian	11–2	7–0	1st	L NAIA Division I Semifinal
1980	Presbyterian	4–7	3–4	T–4th	
1981	Presbyterian	6–5	5–2	2nd	
1982	Presbyterian	5–5–1	4–2–1	5th	
1983	Presbyterian	5–5–1	4–2–1	2nd	
1984	Presbyterian	7–4	5–2	T–2nd	
Presbyterian:		127–101–8	76–37–5		
Total:		127–101–8			
National championship Conference title Conference division title or championship game berth
