= 2011 Stony Brook Seawolves football team =

American college football season

2011 Stony Brook Seawolves football

Big South champion

NCAA Division I Second Round, L 27–34 vs. Sam Houston State
- Conference: Big South Conference

Ranking
- Sports Network: No. 18
- FCS Coaches: No. 16
- Record: 9–4 (6–0 Big South)
- Head coach: Chuck Priore (6th season)
- Offensive coordinator: Jeff Behrman (6th season)
- Defensive coordinator: Rob Nevaiser (1st season)
- Home stadium: Kenneth P. LaValle Stadium

2011 Big South Conference football standings
	Conf.			Overall
Team	W		L	W		L
No. 18 Stony Brook $^	6	–	0	9	–	4
No. 25 Liberty	5	–	1	7	–	4
Coastal Carolina	3	–	3	7	–	4
Presbyterian	3	–	3	4	–	7
Gardner–Webb	2	–	4	4	–	7
VMI	2	–	4	2	–	9
Charleston Southern	0	–	6	0	–	11
$ – Conference champion; ^ – FCS playoff participant; Rankings from The Sports Network poll

The 2011 Stony Brook Seawolves football team represented Stony Brook University as a member of the Big South Conference during the 2011 NCAA Division I FCS football season. Led by sixth-year head coach Chuck Priore, the Seawolves compiled an overall record of 9–4 with a mark of 6–0 conference play, winning the Big South title for the third consecutive season. Stony Brook advanced to the NCAA Division I Football Championship playoffs for the first time in program history, where the Seawolves defeated Albany in the first round before falling in the second round to top-ranked Sam Houston State. Stony Brook was ranked No. 18 in the final Sports Network Poll and No. 16 in the final FCS Coaches Poll. The team played home games at Kenneth P. LaValle Stadium in Stony Brook, New York.

== Schedule ==
For the second straight year in the program history, Stony Brook will face an FBS school after facing South Florida the previous year. This year it will face Buffalo and UTEP increasing the strength of the schedule. It will have six home games and it will close the season at LaValle against the conference rivals Liberty. All games will be in the Big South Network and broadcast in local radio by WUSB FM with a live stream on the web. Additionally, the Buffalo game will be regionally aired by TWCS and nationally broadcast on ESPN3. The Coastal Carolina game will also be broadcast by ESPN3, a first for Stony Brook football.

Date	Time	Opponent	Rank	Site	TV	Result	Attendance	Source
September 3	9:00 pm	at UTEP*		Sun Bowl; El Paso, TX		L 24–31 ^{OT}	28,752	
September 10	6:00 pm	at Buffalo*		University at Buffalo Stadium; Amherst, NY	TWCS	L 7–35	21,933	
September 17	6:00 pm	Brown*		Kenneth P. LaValle Stadium; Stony Brook, NY		L 20–21	5,731	
September 24	6:00 pm	Lafayette*^{†}		Kenneth P. LaValle Stadium; Stony Brook, NY		W 37–20	8,278	
October 8	6:00 pm	Presbyterian		Kenneth P. LaValle Stadium; Stony Brook, NY		W 42–24	4,103	
October 15	6:00 pm	Saint Anselm*		Kenneth P. LaValle Stadium; Stony Brook, NY		W 55–6	3,095	
October 22	1:30 pm	at VMI		Alumni Memorial Field; Lexington, VA		W 42–14	5,142	
October 29	4:00 pm	Coastal Carolina		Kenneth P. LaValle Stadium; Stony Brook, NY	ESPN3	W 42–0	1,619	
November 5	1:30 pm	at Charleston Southern		Buccaneer Field; Charleston, SC		W 50–31	2,806	
November 12	1:30 pm	at Gardner–Webb		Ernest W. Spangler Stadium; Boiling Springs, NC		W 76–28	4,209	
November 19	1:00 pm	No. 16 Liberty		Kenneth P. LaValle Stadium; Stony Brook, NY	ESPN3, MASN	W 41–31	7,896	
November 26	2:00 pm	Albany*	No. 22	Kenneth P. LaValle Stadium; Stony Brook, NY (NCAA Division I First Round, rivalry)	ESPN3	W 31–28	8,286	
December 3	3:00 pm	at No. 1 Sam Houston State*	No. 22	Bowers Stadium; Huntsville, TX (NCAA Division I Second Round)	ESPN3	L 27–34	8,161	
*Non-conference game; ^{†}Homecoming; Rankings from The Sports Network Poll released prior to the game; All times are in Eastern time

== Rankings ==
Ranking movements Legend: ██ Increase in ranking ██ Decrease in ranking RV = Received votes
	Week														
Poll	Pre	1	2	3	4	5	6	7	8	9	10	11	12	13	Final
The Sports Network	RV	RV	RV	RV	RV	RV	RV	RV	RV	RV	RV	RV	22	18	
Coaches	RV	RV										RV	24	16	

== Before the season ==
=== Losses ===
The Seawolves had several losses due to graduation. The Seawolves lost Edwin Gowins who earned first-team All-Big South honors in each of his first two seasons, and he was named the College Sporting News’ national freshman of the year in 2008 but experienced injuries late in the 2009 season and widely affected his performance in 2010. Gowins left to play at the Division III level. Paul Fenaroli graduated and signed a three-year contract with the NFL Atlanta Falcons.

=== Spring Game ===
The Seawolves played their annual spring game on April 10, 2011 at LaValle in front of a small crowd in which the offense beat the Defense 51-15.

=== Rankings and polls ===
The Seawolves were ranked in the top 15 among FCS teams by the "Phil Steele's College Football Review" ahead of their conference rivals, Liberty, which was placed in the 31st position. This is the highest ranking spot ever achieved by the Seawolves program. Stony Brook was picked second in the Big South Coaches' Preseason-Poll receiving 2 first-place votes behind the Liberty Flames. Stony Brook also received a vote in The Sports Network FCS Preseason Poll.

=== Honors ===
Five Stony Brook football athletes were named preseason All-Big South. Junior Miguel Maysonet and senior Brock Jackolski and Matt Brevi represented the team in offense while senior Ryan Haber, and junior Craiq Richardson were the defensive honorees.

=== Recruitment ===
The Seawolves have landed FBS recruit Fernando Diaz from the University of Pittsburgh eligible to play for the upcoming season. The Seawolves added 25 recruits in total for the upcoming 2011-12 season.

College recruiting (2011)
Name	Hometown	School	Height	Weight	40^{‡}	Commit date
Dante Allen; DE	Huntington, NY	Huntington	6 ft 5 in (1.96 m)	240 lb (110 kg)	--	
Dante Allen; DE	Recruit ratings: No ratings found					
Bryce Brantley; DE	Huntington Beach, CA	Edison/Orange Coast	6 ft 4 in (1.93 m)	255 lb (116 kg)	--	
Bryce Brantley; DE	Recruit ratings: No ratings found					
Naim Cheeseboro; DB	King of Prussia, PA	Upper Merion	6 ft 1 in (1.85 m)	190 lb (86 kg)	--	
Naim Cheeseboro; DB	Recruit ratings: No ratings found					
Craig Geoghan; DB	Ronkonkoma, NY	Sachem N./Nassau Community College	6 ft 1 in (1.85 m)	195 lb (88 kg)	--	
Craig Geoghan; DB	Recruit ratings: No ratings found					
Jerry Hubshman; OL	Dunmore, PA	Dunmore	6 ft 4 in (1.93 m)	265 lb (120 kg)	--	
Jerry Hubshman; OL	Recruit ratings: No ratings found					
Masengo Kabongo; DL	Stratford, CT	Fairfield Prep/Maryland	6 ft 2 in (1.88 m)	285 lb (129 kg)	--	
Masengo Kabongo; DL	Recruit ratings: No ratings found					
Mark Matteson; OL	Salina, KS	Salina South/Coffeyville CC	6 ft 3 in (1.91 m)	275 lb (125 kg)	--	
Mark Matteson; OL	Recruit ratings: No ratings found					
Dan Mulrooney; FS	Prospect, CT	Holy Cross	6 ft 1 in (1.85 m)	208 lb (94 kg)	--	
Dan Mulrooney; FS	Recruit ratings: No ratings found					
Louis Murray; DB	Inglewood, CA	Junipero Serra	6 ft 0 in (1.83 m)	175 lb (79 kg)	--	
Louis Murray; DB	Recruit ratings: No ratings found					
Lyle Negron; QB	Bakersfield, CA	Murrieta Vlly/Bakersfield	6 ft 1 in (1.85 m)	225 lb (102 kg)	--	
Lyle Negron; QB	Recruit ratings: No ratings found					
Preston Randolph; DB	Lawrence, KS	Free State/Coffeyville CC	6 ft 1 in (1.85 m)	190 lb (86 kg)	--	
Preston Randolph; DB	Recruit ratings: No ratings found					
Kevin Norrell; WR	Los Angeles, CA	Long Beach Poly/El Camino	5 ft 10 in (1.78 m)	200 lb (91 kg)	--	
Kevin Norrell; WR	Recruit ratings: No ratings found					
Julian Quinton; LB	East Brunswick, NJ	East Brunswick	5 ft 11 in (1.80 m)	190 lb (86 kg)	--	
Julian Quinton; LB	Recruit ratings: No ratings found					
Grahm Saunders; DE	Lawrence, KS	Free State/Coffeyville CC	6 ft 4 in (1.93 m)	255 lb (116 kg)	--	
Grahm Saunders; DE	Recruit ratings: No ratings found					
Fernando Diaz; WR	Bronx, NY	Cardinal Hayes High School / University of Pittsburgh	N/A	N/A	--	
Fernando Diaz; WR	Recruit ratings: No ratings found					
Jamie Williams; DB	Hamilton, NJ	Hamilton West	5 ft 9 in (1.75 m)	186 lb (84 kg)	--	
Jamie Williams; DB	Recruit ratings: No ratings found					
Kedar Hunter; DB	Jamaica, NY	Holy Cross High School	5 ft 9 in (1.75 m)	175 lb (79 kg)		
Kedar Hunter; DB	Recruit ratings: No ratings found					
James Barry; LB	Staten Island, NY	Poly Prep	N/A	N/A		
James Barry; LB	Recruit ratings: No ratings found					
Victor Ochi; DE	Valley Stream, NY	Valley Stream Central High School	6 ft 2 in (1.88 m)	225 lb (102 kg)		
Victor Ochi; DE	Recruit ratings: No ratings found					
Karim Mohamed; OL	Lawrence, NY	Lawrence	6 ft 5 in (1.96 m)	315 lb (143 kg)		
Karim Mohamed; OL	Recruit ratings: No ratings found					
Dimitry Russ; DE	Deer Park, NY	Deer Park	6 ft 2 in (1.88 m)	225 lb (102 kg)		
Dimitry Russ; DE	Recruit ratings: No ratings found					
Joseph Danaker; OL	Germantown, MD	Lackawanna College	6 ft 2 in (1.88 m)	300 lb (140 kg)		
Joseph Danaker; OL	Recruit ratings: No ratings found					
Ivan May; DB	El Cajon, CA	Grossmont College	5 ft 9 in (1.75 m)	170 lb (77 kg)		
Ivan May; DB	Recruit ratings: No ratings found					
Steven Watts; OL	San Clemente, CA	Saddleback College	6 ft 3 in (1.91 m)	285 lb (129 kg)		
Steven Watts; OL	Recruit ratings: No ratings found					
Michael Lisi; OL	Franklin Square, New York	Suffield Academy	6 ft 2 in (1.88 m)	280 lb (130 kg)		
Michael Lisi; OL	Recruit ratings: No ratings found					
Overall recruit ranking:
Note: In many cases, Scout, Rivals, 247Sports, On3, and ESPN may conflict in their listings of height and weight.; In these cases, the average was taken. ESPN grades are on a 100-point scale.; Sources: "2011 Team Ranking". Rivals.com.

== Game summaries ==
=== UTEP ===
Team	1	2	3	4	OT	Total
Seawolves	7	3	14	0	0	24
• Miners	0	3	14	7	7	31

- Date: September 3
- Location: Sun Bowl
  El Paso, TX
- Game start: 9:05pm EST
- Elapsed time: 3:09
- Game attendance: 28,752
- Game weather: 94 F, Mostly Cloudy, Wind ESE 14 MPH
- Referee: Randy Smith

Recap: The Seawolves travelled to UTEP for their first game ever in Texas and their second game against an FBS school in history. With an improved team, the Seawolves held command for most of the game and by the end of the 1st quarter the Seawolves found themselves leading 7-0. In the second quarter, both teams traded field goals as the Seawolves entered halftime with a 10-3 lead. It was, however, in the third quarter where the Seawolves offense exploded and scored two touchdowns nine seconds apart as UTEP fumbled the ball and allowed Jonathan Coats to run for a 14-yard return. At this point the Seawolves led 24-10 but it wasn't too long before Miners scored to put the game back into single possession. In the fourth quarter, the Seawolves defense was noticeably weakening, allowing the Miners to tie the game at 24 with 4:04 left in regulation. As the teams continued into Overtime, UTEP scored a touchdown, taking the lead for the first time, and the Seawolves lost their chance to tie with an intercepted throw ending the game in UTEP's favor.

In the game Junior Miguel Maysonet and senior Brock Jackolski combined for 199 rushing yards as Stony Brook gained 232 yards on the ground. The defense, led by senior Donald Porter's two interceptions, recovered two fumbles, including one for a touchdown. Coach Priore later said, “I think we have a lot of talent that this crowd witnessed tonight,” and added, “We made a few mistakes that ultimately hurt us. I was proud of the effort, and we'll build off this game”.

=== Buffalo ===
Team	1	2	3	4	Total
Seawolves	0	7	0	0	7
• Bulls	7	14	14	0	35

- Date: September 10
- Location: University at Buffalo Stadium
  Amherst, NY
- Game start: 6:00pm EST
- Elapsed time: 2:50
- Game attendance: 21,933
- Game weather: 75F, Partly Cloudy, Wind NE 11 MPH
- Referee: Shawn Smith
- Television network: TWCS, ESPN3

Recap: The Seawolves traveled to Amherst to face off against Buffalo for their first time ever, and only the third football game in program history against an FBS football program. This was the first time Stony Brook played another SUNY rival since it last played Albany in the 2007 season.

Buffalo started the offense quickly scoring on a 57-yard pass after 19 seconds of regulation to take the lead. While the Defense held the Bulls scoreless for the rest of the first quarter Stony Brook was unable to tie the game until 1:46 minute into the second quarter. However, it wasn't long before Buffalo exploded with two back-to-back runs by Branden Oliver to put the Bulls up 21-7 by halftime taking the lead for good. Buffalo kept the Seawolves scoreless for the rest of the game capping their lead with two more touchdowns for an eventual 35-7 win.

Despite the loss, the Seawolves were able to dominate ball possession holding the ball for over 39 minutes of regulation but being held out of Buffalo's territory for most of the game. Stony Brook also rushed the ball for a total of 184 yards against Buffalo's 165 yards. The Seawolves, however, fumbled the ball twice (one while at 2nd and Goal) and allowed one interception for a total of three turnovers and passed the ball for only 114 yards against Buffalo's 177. After the game Coach Priore commented on the game saying "We didn't execute, but I think we realized that we can compete physically at this level. There are certain things you take out of these games, and one of those is building confidence going forward". Stony Brook dropped to 0-2 overall while Buffalo gets its first win of the season.

=== Brown ===
Team	1	2	3	4	Total
• Bears	7	0	7	7	21
Seawolves	3	7	7	3	20

- Date: September 17
- Location: Kenneth P. LaValle Stadium
  Stony Brook, NY
- Game start: 6:00pm EST
- Elapsed time: 2:30
- Game attendance: 5,732
- Game weather: 52F, Partly Cloudy, Wind ENE 7 MPH
- Referee: Tom Zimorski

Recap: The Seawolves opened their 2011 home season against Brown in front 5,732 fans. After a slow start from both sides, the Seawolves’ Skiffington kicked for a 38-yard field goal to put Stony Brook ahead late in the 1st Quarter. The lead didn't last long as Brown stepped up their passing game with Alex Tounkara-Kone receiving a 38-yard pass from Kyle Newhall-Caballero to score the game's first touchdown, putting Brown ahead 7-3 by the end of the quarter. Stony Brook opened the second quarter with an 18-yard scoring run by Essington and a conversion by Skiffington to put the Seawolves ahead 10-7. Stony Brook's defense kept Brown scoreless through the quarter and held on to the lead entering halftime. In the third quarter, Stony Brook kept control of the offense and increased their lead with the help of Miguel Maysonet which rushed 26 yards to put the Seawolves ahead by 10. However, momentum switched in Brown's favor as they scored with a 46-yard reception by Tounkara-Kone to put Brown back into the game, 14-17. In the middle of the fourth quarter Stony Brook kicked for a field goal to make the game 20-14. As the game came close to an ending a late Brown rally and a series of personal penalties (two 15 yard penalties) concluded with a touchdown by Tellef Lundevall (conversion by Alexander Norocea) allowing Brown to regain a one-point lead (21-20). Stony Brook rushed the ball and made a 56-yard field goal which was replayed due to a time-out called by Brown. A second attempt came up empty as Brown took away the game by a score of 21-20, and took the four-year series 3-1.

The Seawolves offense rushed for 246 yards (Maysonet-Jackolski pair rushed for a combined 227 yardage) against Brown's 28 and passed for a total of 78 yards against Brown's 292. Stony Brook allowed only a single turnover while Brown allowed a pair. The time of possession was fairly even throughout the game with a Stony Brook holding for 30:47 minutes. After the game, Coach Priore commented saying “If you're a good football team, those things don't happen to you, or the game isn't close enough where they become that much of an issue in the game” and added "The problem was, it happened in a one-score game...at the end of the day, those things happen to all teams". Stony Brook fell to 0-3 after week three while Brown won its first game of the season.

=== Lafayette ===
Team	1	2	3	4	Total
Leopards	3	3	7	7	20
• Seawolves	0	6	17	14	37

- Date: September 24
- Location: Kenneth P. LaValle Stadium
  Stony Brook, NY
- Game start: 6:00pm EST
- Elapsed time: 3:15
- Game attendance: 8,278
- Game weather: 70 F, Cloudy, Wind N 4 MPH
- Referee: Jeff Heaser

Recap: The Seawolves opened their second home game of the season looking to get their first win of the season after a heartbreaking loss to Brown the prior week. They faced off against Lafayette for the second time ever in front of a sold-out crowd of 8,278 celebrating Wolfstock, the homecoming tradition, at LaValle Stadium. Lafayette was able to put up points early in the game with a 30-yard field goal by O’Brien to put the Leopards on top 3-0. Another field goal in the second quarter allowed the leopard to take a 6-0 lead, however, the Seawolves defense proved to be tough and kept Lafayette scoreless until the mid-third quarter while the Seawolves put up two field goals to leave the game tied at six by halftime. Early in the third quarter the Seawolves unleashed a powerful running offense taking a 20-6 lead on two running touchdowns by Maysonet. The Defense kept the Leopard to a single touchdown and the Seawolves later added another field goal in a 46-yard kick by Skiffintong to extend their lead to 23-13 by the end of the third quarter. The Seawolves continued their strong offense throughout the fourth quarter outscoring the Leopards 14-7 to capture their first win 37-20.

A good defensive effort by the Seawolves produced five turnovers by the Leopards, all of them deep in Seawolves territory. Stony Brook only turned the ball over once, a season low. Junior Miguel Maysonet rushed for a career-high 194 yards, and tied his own LaValle Stadium and school record with four touchdowns. The rushing game proved important as the Seawolves rushed for 300 of their 335 total yards of offense. Junior Wesley Skiffington connected on three field goals and all four extra points, becoming Stony Brook's all-time leading scorer among kickers with 164 points. He broke Mike Soto's record of 156, set in 2003. Dan Mulrooney led a strong Stony Brook defense with eight tackles, a fumble recovery, a forced fumble and an interception. Coach Priore commented on the game saying "We talked about playing four quarters of football tonight," and added "I really liked our effort tonight. We started to gain some momentum in the second quarter. We talked about going for some big plays at halftime, and I thought we played our best third quarter of the night" [Sic]. The Seawolves will enjoy a bye-week and their continue the four game series at home.

=== Presbyterian ===
Team	1	2	3	4	Total
Blue Hose	3	7	7	7	24
• Seawolves	14	7	21	0	42

- Date: October 8
- Location: Kenneth P. LaValle Stadium
  Stony Brook, NY
- Game start: 6:00pm EST
- Elapsed time: 3:00
- Game attendance: 4,103
- Game weather: 69F, Clear, Wind SW 4 MPH
- Referee: David Epperley

Recap:After the loss of starting senior quarterback, Michael Coulter, for the rest of the season to a persistent injury (Torn ACL) Stony Brook placed backup Kyle Essington to fill in the starting role for the team. Priore reported that Essington was ready and that for the month of August he received about 85% of the snaps in preparation for the possible starting role.

Returning to LaValle stadium after a bye-week, Stony Brook searched for its second win of the season facing off against conference foes Presbyterian Blue Hose, a team that has never defeated the Seawolves, in front of a 4,103 crowd. Stony Brook opened the game midway through the 1st quarter with an 18-yard touchdown run by QB Essington (Kick by Wesley Skiffington). Later in the quarter Blue Hose Aaron Mayes kicked a 33-yard field goal to cut Stony Brook's lead. However, Stony Brook responded with a 44-yard touchdown pass received by Matt Brevi for 14-3 lead by the end of the quarter. In the second quarter, both teams traded touchdowns with Essington passing for another 40-yard reception. Stony Brook held a 21-10 lead at halftime. Presbyterian scored a touchdown on a 7-yard pass early in the third quarter to cut the deficit to four points but the rest of the quarter was all Stony Brook. The Seawolves scored 21 unanswered points in the quarter with a breakthrough of the offense and a strong passing game by Essington who passed for 22 yards and 42 yards respectively for a 42-17 lead entering the fourth quarter. Presbyterian advanced and cut the lead with a touchdown while keeping the Stony Brook offense scoreless but the Seawolves’ defense held the Blue Hose scoreless for the rest of the game for a 42-24 win and their first conference win of the season. The Seawolves improved to 2-3, 1-0 in the Big South this season while Presbyterian falls to 1-4, 0-1.

Stony Brook passed for 292 yard against 150 by Presbyterian and rushed for 170 against 277 yards by the Blue Hose. This is the first game of the season in which the Seawolves passed more than they rushed, perhaps signifying a change in strategy with quarterback Essington who passed for four touchdowns. Stony Brook held possession for 31:40 and both teams turned over the ball once. A Hail mary play by Essington and receiver Brevi received recognition in ESPN Sports Center Top 10 plays, the first time Stony Brook appeared in the program for a football game.

After the game coach Priore commented saying “Tonight was a real good victory for us,” and added “I thought we had a solid game plan which was executed well. Presbyterian challenged us with some different looks, but I thought we threw the ball efficiently and successfully”. Essington commented on his successful start by saying "Coming off the bye week allowed us to get in some great work”. Essington will remain quarterback for the rest of the season.

=== Saint Anselm ===
Team	1	2	3	4	Total
Hawks	0	0	6	0	6
• Seawolves	13	21	14	7	55

- Date: October 15
- Location: Kenneth P. LaValle Stadium
  Stony Brook, NY
- Game start: 6:00pm EST
- Elapsed time: 2:28
- Game attendance: 3,095
- Game weather: 62 F, Clear, Wind SW 7 MPH
- Referee: J. Magallanes

Recap: Stony Brook ran for a school record 404 yards in their 55-6 win over St. Anselm.

Running backs JeVahn Cruz and Brock Jackolski led the way for Stony Brook (4-3), combining for 4 touchdowns in the contest. Jackolski, who finished with 99 yards on 10 carries, scored twice in the first quarter on runs from 21 yards and 1 yard out. Cruz added his two scores late in the second half on runs of 63 yards and 3 yards.

Cruz finished with 169 yards on 10 carries.

Kyle Essington led the Seawolves, recording 275 yards through the air and 3 touchdowns while completing 16 of 20 attempts.

Stony Brook's defense stuffed St. Anselm (0-7), holding the Hawks to 17 yards rushing on 21 carries. St. Anselm was forced to punt nine times and only converted 1 of 13 third down attempts.

=== VMI ===
Team	1	2	3	4	Total
• Seawolves	0	7	21	14	42
Keydets	0	0	7	7	14

- Date: October 22
- Location: Alumni Memorial Field
  Lexington, VA
- Game start: 1:30pm EST
- Elapsed time: 2:42
- Game attendance: 5,142
- Game weather: 61F, Sunny, Wind SSW 3 MPH
- Referee: Ron Cherry

Recap: Kyle Essington threw for two touchdowns and ran for another to help lead Stony Brook over Virginia Military Academy 42-14.

Essington was 18 of 23 for 255 yards and scored on a 1-yard run to open a 28-point streak by the Seawolves (4-3, 2-0 Big South Conference), which started with 21 seconds left in the second quarter.

While Stony Brook had little trouble scoring—taking a 28-0 lead on Grant Nakwaasah's 29-yard fumble return—offense was hard to come by for the Keydets (1-6, 1-2).

VMI totaled just 267 yards of offense, with only 38 coming on the ground. Stony Brook's defense allowed just three drives to go longer than five plays, and forced the Keydets to punt 11 times.

VMI's only scores came on an 81-yard pass from Adam Morgan to Aaron Lewis and a 3-yard run by Chaz Jones for the final margin.

=== Coastal Carolina ===
Team	1	2	3	4	Total
Chanticleers	0	0	0	0	0
• Seawolves	14	0	14	14	42

- Date: October 29
- Location: Kenneth P. LaValle Stadium
  Stony Brook, NY
- Game start: 4:00pm EST
- Elapsed time: 2:49
- Game attendance: 1,619
- Game weather: 33F, Wintry Mix (Nor'easter), Wind N 12-30 MPH
- Referee: Tom Zimorksi
- TV announcers (ESPN3): Matt Hougue, James Buford

Recap: Stony Brook came out in search of its fifth straight win of the 2011 season against conference rival Coastal Carolina returning to LaValle Stadium for their fifth home game of the season. With the 2011 Big South auto-bid on the line (Liberty and Stony Brook undefeated in conference play) Stony Brook and the Chanticleers faced off in front of 1,619 fans, a game largely affected by a rare Halloween Nor’easter impacting much of the Northeast.

In the first quarter, Coastal Carolina got a 64-yard drive but was unable to kick in a field goal. The initial drive was followed by 85 yard scoring drive by the Seawolves capped with a 9-yard TD run by Miguel Maysonet (kick by Wesley Skiffington) to put the Seawolves on top 7-0 with 4:42 left in the quarter. It wasn't long until the Seawolves scored once again with a turnover by Coastal close to the endzone resulting in a Touchdown by Maysonet followed by a kick by Skiffington to take a 14-0 by the end of the opening quarter. Strong defense on both ends in the second quarter stalled Stony Brook's offense ending the first half with a 14-0 lead. However, Stony Brook returned to its powerful rushing offense in the third quarter with a 51-yard scoring drive capped by a 26-yard run by Maysonet for a 21-0 lead. This was followed by punt block close to the Chanticleer end zone resulting in another touchdown and a 28-0 lead by the end of the third quarter. Seawolves scored 14 more points in the fourth quarter for an eventual 42-0 win, their first shutout of the season.

The Seawolves rushed for 446 yards against Coastal Carolina's 60. The Seawolves didn't record a single passing yard while CC passed for 13 yards. 64 out Coastal Carolina's 73 yards were part of their first drive. Stony Brook forced two Chanticleer turnovers and possessed the ball for 33:57 minutes. Jackolski and Maysonet powered the rushing offense combining for 384 yards. Maysonet commented after the game saying "Running the ball is what Stony Brook football is built upon...That's what we're good at". Coach Priore also commented saying "I'm really proud of our guys for the way they approached the game, They made the adjustments with the way the weather played out. As for the running game, it's our philosophy. We believe we can win a championship that way”. Stony Brook is now 5-3, 3-0 in the Big South while Coastal Carolina falls to 4-4, 1-3 in the league.

=== Charleston Southern ===
Team	1	2	3	4	Total
• Seawolves	6	21	16	7	50
Buccaneers	10	0	14	7	31

- Date: November 5
- Location: Buccaneer Field
  Charleston, SC
- Game start: 1:30pm EST
- Elapsed time: 3:02
- Game attendance: 2,806
- Game weather: 63F, Clear, Wind N 12 MPH
- Referee: Brad Allen

Recap:Stony Brook travelled down to Charleston to face off against a winless Buccaneers team and a chance to win a school-record six straight victory their 2011 campaign. In front of 2,806 fans the Seawolves offense attacked quickly in the first quarter with a 59-yard touchdown run by Miguel Maysonet (failed kick by Pat) to put the Seawolves on top 6-0 with 13:55 left in the quarter. An offensive drive by the Buccaneers and a forty-yard field goal by Brown cut the lead by three. The Buccaneers followed by scoring a touchdown to take a 10-6 lead into the second quarter, the first time in the season the Seawolves trailed in the first quarter. However, the second quarter was all Seawolves offense resulting in three uncontested touchdown drives with an impressive rushing effort from Maysonet and Jackolski to put the Seawolves ahead by a score of 27-10 heading into halftime.

In the third quarter the Buccaneers came out strong with a passing touchdown by Perera to cut the lead to 27-17 but the Seawolves put one of their own with a 43-yard rushing touchdown by Maysonet to add seven to their lead with 9:03 left in their third quarter. Charleston continued their offensive effort as they scored another touchdown to cut the lead to ten again. Seawolves responded with a safety after a failed Charleston Southern punt and closed the quarter with a 6-yard run by QB Kyle Essington and a 43-24 lead. In the fourth quarter, the teams traded touchdowns which included a 55-yard run by Jackolski for an eventual 50-31 win by the Seawolves who held the game for their sixth consecutive victory and ensured an unofficial “Big South Championship” game against Liberty to be played at Stony Brook. Stony Brook remained a half-game back of Liberty, both undefeated in conference play, with a 6-3 overall, 4-0 Big South record while Charleston fell to 0-9, 0-4 in the season.

The Maysonet-Jackolski duo combined for 356 rushing yards and six touchdown in the game as Maysonet set the program's record for career rushing touchdown with twenty-five after by the game's completion. Maysonet and Jackolski have amounted to 1,178 and 1,001 rushing yards respectively eight touchdowns combined so far this season. As a team the Seawolves passed for 109 and ran for a net 355 for a total 464 against 335 yards by Charleston Southern. Stony Brook held possession of the ball for 29:44.

Commenting on the win Coach Priore said “Brock and Miguel complement each other so well...They are very special to this team. What makes them so great is that they have no hidden agenda" and commented in the rushing defense which allowed -7 yards "That was on point today...we forced them into a lot of passing situations, which they were good at today. But I'm proud of our team. We controlled the game the whole time."

=== Gardner–Webb ===
Team	1	2	3	4	Total
• Seawolves	14	14	21	27	76
Runnin' Bulldogs	7	6	7	8	28

- Date: November 12
- Location: Ernest W. Spangler Stadium
  Boiling Springs, NC
- Game start: 1:30pm EST
- Elapsed time: 3:07
- Game attendance: 4,209
- Game weather: 56F, Clear, Wind SSW 5 MPH
- Referee: Robert Zivkovic

Recap: Stony Brook traveled down to Boiling Springs, N.C in search of their seventh consecutive win of the season and with hopes of staying undefeated prior to their last game of the season, deemed, the Big South Championship game. The Seawolves did just that opening the game early with a touchdown by Brock Jackolski to put the Seawolves up 7-0 with 12:50 in the quarter. It took the Seawolves only 1:30 minutes to earn scored their second touchdown after a forced fumble by the GWU offense resulted in a 54-yard scoring run by Al-Majid Hutchins. The Bulldogs responded with a touchdown of their own to cut the deficit ending the first quarter with a 14-7 Stony Brook lead. Gardner Webb continued their offensive push with 50-yard running touchdown by Ricky Rhodes but failed to tie the game after a missed kicked. The rest of the quarter was all Stony Brook offense with Jackolski scoring twice to put the Seawolves up 28-13 and taking the lead for good.

Gardner Webb opened the third quarter with a renewed offense to cut Stony Brook's lead to 28-13 but the Seawolves responded with an offensive strike of their own with three unanswered touchdowns by Norel, Maysonet (63-yard run), and Brevi (30-yard pass) respectively widening the lead to 49-20 and erasing any chance of a comeback. For the sixth straight game, the Seawolves offense scored more than 42 points, a school record. In the fourth quarter GWU scored first, but the Seawolves responded with a strong defense who forced four turnovers and another run of four unanswered touchdown for an eventual win of 76-28 over Gardner Webb and setting the stage for a decisive end of the season "Championship" game against Liberty, in which winner takes Championship and FCS autobid. With the victory, the Seawolves set a new school records for most points scored in a game, 76, surpassing the 70-20 win against Brooklyn College back in 1988 (back the known as Division III Stony Brook Patriots) and two points shy of tying the record for margin of points. The Seawolves also set a Big South high surpassing the record set by Liberty, 73 points against VMI, back in 2007.

Stony Brook amounted for a total of 509 yards, 315 in their rushing game. Jackolski recorded five touchdowns, four of those on the ground making it the third time a Stony Brook player rushed for four touchdowns in a game this season. Quarterback Essington threw three touchdown passes two three different receivers. Junior Skiffington tied a Big South record on his own with 10 extra points kicked. The defense also played strong, forcing six Gardner Webb touchdowns which included a defensive touchdown by Al-Majid Hutchins. In the Gardner Webb end the offense amounted to 381 total yards, with 248 rushing yards and the defense failed to force a single turnover.

After the game Coach Priore commented on the game saying "I applaud this team for taking a one-game approach all season...Ever since the game at UTEP, this team has taken on the mentality of the next play. Our coaches have made the necessary adjustments, and our kids have executed them. Today was no different". Stony Brook improves to 7-3, 5-0 while Gardner Webb falls to 4-6, 2-3 in the Big South.

=== Liberty ===
Big South Championship Game

Team	1	2	3	4	Total
#16 Flames	7	14	10	0	31
• Seawolves	14	10	7	10	41

- Date: November 19
- Location: Kenneth P. LaValle Stadium
  Stony Brook, NY
- Game start: 3:30pm EST
- Elapsed time: 3:06
- Game attendance: 7,896
- Game weather: 53F, Clear,
- Referee: Gary Patterson
- Television network: Flames Sports Net/ESPN3

Recap: Considered the Big South Championship game, the Seawolves and Liberty faced off for their last game of the season with a conference undefeated season, a Big South Championship, and an automatic bid to the playoffs at stake in front of 7,896 fans at LaValle Stadium. For Stony Brook it meant the possibility of their eight straight win of the season after starting 0-3. Liberty scored a touchdown midway through the first quarter to take a 7-0 lead, however, the Seawolves responded two drives later with a touchdown of their own capped by a 39-yard run from Jackolski. Stony Brook scored again in the follow-up drive after an interception to take a 14-7 lead after a 26-yard reception by Kevin Norrell. Less than a minute after the second quarter started Liberty's offense struck back to tie the game at 14. Stony Brook's offense responded with a 36-yard field goal by Skiffington to retake the lead. Both teams traded touchdowns before going into the locker room with a 24-21 Stony Brook lead. Liberty opened the quarter, again, this time with a field goal to tie the game for the third time but in the ensuing Stony Brook drive the Seawolves scored for a touchdown by running back Jackolski to regain the lead. Liberty closed the third quarter with a touchdown of their own behind a 15-yard run by Quarterback Mike Brown. Coming out in the fourth quarter the Seawolves scored the final touchdown of the game after 5:21 offensive drive, and capped the victory with a field goal after a controversial fumble by the Liberty offense.

With the victory the Seawolves become outright Big South Champions for the first time in history, after sharing the title for two previous years. Stony Brook improved to 8-3, 6-0 for the season being the first team in Big South history to be undefeated in conference play. For Stony Brook it is the longest winning streak, eight, and also the first trip ever to NCAA Division I Football Championship a big step after first offering scholarships in 2005. Stony Brook closes the season 8-3, 6-0 in the Big South while Liberty falls to 7-4, 5-1. The Seawolves will face Albany in the first round of the playoffs.

=== Albany—NCAA Division I First Round ===
NCAA Division I Football Championship: First Round

Team	1	2	3	4	Total
Great Danes	7	14	7	0	28
• #22 Seawolves	0	10	14	7	31

- Date: November 26
- Location: Kenneth P. LaValle Stadium
  Stony Brook, NY
- Game start: 3:00PM EST
- Elapsed time: 2:59
- Game attendance: 8,286
- Game weather: 62F, Sunny, Wind SW 5-10 MPH
- Referee: W. Broadhurst
- Television network: ESPN3

Recap: After winning their first outright Big South Championship the prior week the Seawolves headed to their first NCAA Division I playoff game in program history ranked #22 in The Sports Network poll. The NCAA Selection Sunday Committee paired them up against the Albany Great Danes, SUNY rivals and America East Conference rivals, who were the Northeast Conference co-champions and also first time playoff participants. Coach Priore also attended Albany in the late 1970s and was coached by Albany's current football coach Bob Ford.

Stony Brook faced off against Albany in front of a sold-out Thanksgiving weekend crowd of 8,286 at LaValle Stadium. Albany led the way in the first quarter scoring a touchdown with 20 seconds left of regulation after the Seawolves failed to capitalize in their previous two offensive drives which included one deep in Albany's red zone. Entering the second quarter the Seawolves QB K.Essington attempted a pass which was dropped by M.Brevi and forced a punt. Albany defense blocked the punt and Brian Parker ran 21 yards to the end-zone to extend Albany's lead to 14-0. The Seawolves responded with an offensive drive of their own but had to settle for a field goal after Essington got sacked twice by Albany's defense. Albany ensuing drive was stopped by Stony Brook forcing a 33-yard punt in the 50-yard line. Stony Brook capitalized in the follow-up drive as Essington capped it with an 11-yard pass to Brevi to cut Albany's lead to 14-10. Later in the quarter Albany responded once again with another touchdown taking a 21-10 lead into halftime. This was the first time since playing Buffalo early in the season that Stony Brook trailed for such a large margin.

With less than two minutes into the third quarter and with only four plays Albany's offense scored another touchdown to put the Great Danes in a comfortable 28-10 lead. However, the Seawolves defense stopped Albany from scoring again and the offense scored two touchdowns in the third quarter to cut the deficit and put the Seawolves back into the game 28-24. An intercepted pass by Donald Porter in the third quarter kept the momentum on Stony Brook's side. The fourth quarter was all Seawolves offense as Albany's defense was noticeably weakened. The Seawolves scored a final touchdown giving them the lead for the first time in the game, 31-28. Albany made one last offensive push with two minutes left in the clock but an interception by Stony Brook's Dominick Reyes at Albany's second & goal sealed the game for Stony Brook for their ninth consecutive victory and their first win in the NCAA Division I Football Championship.

On the win Head Coach Priore commented saying "Wow...I know I say it a lot, but good teams find ways to win. I'm really proud of my alma mater and the job they did tonight, but I'm even more proud of our team. We're excited for the opportunity to play another week". Porter also commented in the last interception which sealed the victory saying "My defensive responsibility was on the tight end, and I was able to get underneath him and tip the pass," and added "Luckily for us, Dom (Dominick Reyes) was there and did a great job keeping his feet in bounds". Reyes which was responsible for the interception added "As a player, I want to be in on the action...It's hard to describe what I'm feeling right now. It hasn't sunk it yet. I saw the ball up in the air and did what you're supposed to do".

Overall Stony Brook amounted to 422 total yards, 258 of those in the passing game against Albany's 348 total yards. Albany turnover the ball twice while Stony Brook committed one turnover. Stony Brook had possession of the ball for 36:40. Brock Jackolski was responsible for three touchdowns and 103 rushing yards. Stony Brook advanced to play #1 Sam Houston State and improved to 9-3, 6-0 in the Big South while Albany closed their season 8-4, 7-1 in the NEC.

=== Sam Houston State–NCAA Division I Second Round ===
NCAA Division I Football Championship: Second Round

Team	1	2	3	4	Total
#22 Seawolves	0	10	0	17	27
• #1 Bearkats	3	0	14	17	34

- Date: December 3rd
- Location: Bowers Stadium
  Huntsville, TX
- Game start: 3:00PM EST
- Elapsed time: 3:20
- Game attendance: 8,161
- Referee: Gregg Wilson
- TV announcers (ESPN3): Dan Gutowsky, Warrick Dunn

Recap: Stony Brook travelled to Huntsville, Texas looking to upset top seeded Sam Houston State, the program's first FCS second round appearance, after the historic comeback against the Albany Great Danes the previous week.

While both teams were known throughout the season to be strong offenses, it was the defense that controlled the game early on for both sides. Sam Houston led off the first quarter but couldn't capitalize in any play while Stony Brook offensively to get any yardage. It wasn't until 11:43 minutes into the first quarter that Sam Houston capitalized on a field goal. The rest of the quarter remained scoreless.

However, the second quarter proved to be different as Stony Brook broke through Sam Houston's strong defense with a three play scoring drive capped by a 37-yard pass to Matt Brevi to place the Seawolves ahead by a score of 7-3. The offensive strike continued as Stony Brook forced a punt and followed up with another 64-yard drive, this time cut short, capped with a 32-yard field goal by Skiffington. Stony Brook took a 10-3 lead into halftime in what seemed to be a defensive battle.

After necessary adjustments, Sam Houston came out in the third quarter with a renewed offense scoring two back-to-back touchdowns and effectively shutting down Stony Brook's offense regaining a 17-10 lead into the fourth quarter. The game was all but over, as Stony Brook opened the quarter with a field goal to cut the deficit. However, SHSU responded with another field goal of their own to expand their lead and stay ahead 13-20. The game turned into a see-saw as both offenses exploded scoring in each of the remaining drives. Stony Brook used their passing game to tie the game at 20. However, SHSU responded once again with an 80-yard run to put them back on top 20-27. Stony Brook continued their effort tying the game once again with 6:37 left of regulation, but Sam Houston outlasted the Seawolves scoring on a final drive with 1:01 left and then holding off the Seawolves’ offense to seal a 34-27 victory.

Sam Houston State advanced to the third round against Montana State while the Seawolves ended their 2011 campaign 9-4 overall, 6-0 in the Big South.

== Roster ==
2011 Stony Brook Seawolves Roster
**Quarterbacks**: 17 Ryan Andersen, Rs Fr; 10 Michael Coulter, Sr; 15 Kyle Essington, Jr; 16 Victor Spinelli, So; 12 Lyle Negron, Jr; **Tailbacks**: 30 Brock Jackolski, Sr; 32 Davon Lawrence, Rs Fr; 5 Miguel Maysonet, Jr; 4 Jevahn Cruz, Rs Fr; 27 Kedar Hunter, Fr; **Fullbacks**: 83 Shane Scorzelli, Rs Fr; 34 Matt Faiella, So; **Wide receivers**: 8 Matt Brevi, Sr; 7 Myles Campbell, So; 89 Kevin Famulari, Jr; 25 Jordan Gush, Jr; 80 Bryant McAdoo, Rs Fr; 81 Chris McMillan, So; 18 Major Mobley, So; 86 Jayvaun Smyer, Fr; 3 Kevin Norrell, Jr	**Tight ends**: 84 Brett Arce, Jr; 11 Chris Fenelon, Jr; 85 Tanner Nehls, Rs Fr; 88 David Shukri, Jr; 82 Nick Buckshaw, Fr; 87 Mark Seeland, Fr; **Offensive linemen**: 69 Michael Bamiro, So; 70 Mario Dattilo, Sr; 63 Joe Faiella, Sr; 57 Joe Danaker, Jr; 67 Scott Hernandez, So; 62 Gerald Hubshman, Fr; 65 Mike Lisi, Fr; 74 Eric Mauler, Jr; 71 Cody Precht, Rs Fr; 79 Omar Boothe, Fr; 94 Elias Martinez, So; 77 Karim Mohamed, Fr; 64 William Ruland, Fr; 61 Phillip Vournazos, Sr; 71 Steven Watts, Jr	**Defensive linemen**: 97 Bryce Brantley, Jr; 98 Janna Chukumerije, So; 92 Jonathan Coats, Sr; 97 Frank Conti, Sr; 96 Ryan Haber, Sr; 66 Kevin Hauter, Rs Fr; 78 Dylan Joslin, Fr; 52 Masengo Kabongo, Jr; 90 Roosevelt Kirk, Sr; 51 Michael Marino, Sr; 99 Andrew Nelson, Sr; 95 Alex Probasco, So; 91 Victor Ochi, Fr; 73 Dante Allen, Fr; 60 Dimitry Russ, Fr; 45 Junior Solice, So; **Linebackers**: 40 James Barry, Fr; 56 Casey Callahan, So; 44 Jawara Dudley, So; 33 Reginald Fracklin, RS Fr; 57 Nick Iorio, Rs Fr	47 Jeremy Leggiero, Fr; 43 Coleman Meier, Fr; 48 Grant Nakwaasah, So; 55 Adam Nowak, So; 46 Julian Quintin, Fr; 35 Craig Richardson, Jr; 49 Andres Trujillo, So; 39 Christian Ricard, Rs Fr; 20 Rich Vitale, Jr; **Defensive backs**: 37 Naim Cheeseboro, Fr; 31 Peace Edafe, So; 48 Craig Geohan, Jr; 36 Taj Johnson, So; 38 Winston Longdon, Jr; 41 Cedrick Moore, Sr; 24 Dominick Reyes, Jr; 28 Vincent Polo, So; 23 Dan Mulrooney, Jr; **Cornerback**: 26 Lois Murray, Fr; 22 Sheldon Armstrong, So; 2 Davonte Anderson, So; 21 Ivan May, Jr; 42 A.J. Valentine, So; 19 Jamie Williams, Fr; 1 Al-Majid Hutchins, Sr; 26 Louis Murray, Fr; 6 Donald Porter, Sr; 29 Devante Wheeler, So	**Kickers**: 53 Luke Allen **K**, So; 50 Josh Gibson **K/P**, Sr; 54 Wesley Skiffington **K/P**, Jr; **Coaching staff**: Chuck Priore, Head Coach; Jeff Behrman, Offensive Coordinator/Quarterbacks; Rob Neviaser, Defensive Coordinator; Carlton Goff, Wide Receivers; Mark Murray, Offensive Line; Tony Thompson, Defensive Line; Jon Woods, Offensive Line; Patrick Hatch, Defensive Line Assistant; Tyler Santucci, Linebackers; Michael Derice, Director of Football Operations; Lyle Hemphill, Safeties; Classes Key: Fr – Freshman; first year player. So – Sophomore; second year player. Jr – Junior; third year player. Sr – Senior; fourth year player. **Bold** – Team captain. Italics – Left team during the season. RS – Previously used a redshirt. – Redshirt during 2010 season. – Injured for entire or majority of season and is eligible for a medical redshirt. Roster
