= 2011 Presbyterian Blue Hose football team =

American college football season

2011 Presbyterian Blue Hose football
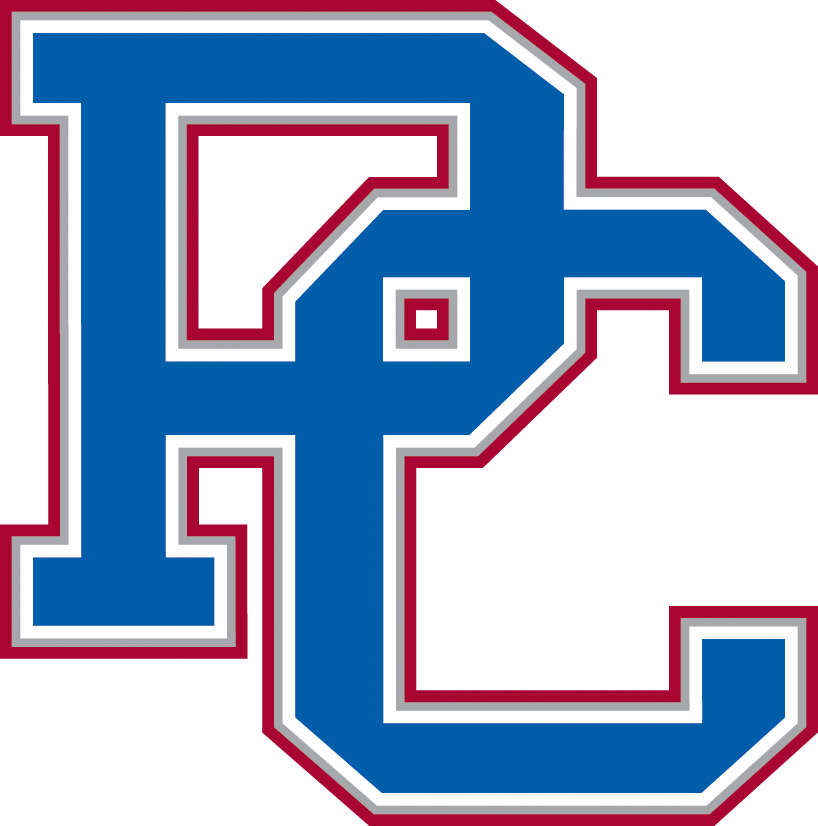
- Conference: Big South Conference
- Record: 4–7 (3–3 Big South)
- Head coach: Harold Nichols (3rd season)
- Home stadium: Bailey Memorial Stadium

2011 Big South Conference football standings
	Conf.			Overall
Team	W		L	W		L
No. 18 Stony Brook $^	6	–	0	9	–	4
No. 25 Liberty	5	–	1	7	–	4
Coastal Carolina	3	–	3	7	–	4
Presbyterian	3	–	3	4	–	7
Gardner–Webb	2	–	4	4	–	7
VMI	2	–	4	2	–	9
Charleston Southern	0	–	6	0	–	11
$ – Conference champion; ^ – FCS playoff participant; Rankings from The Sports Network poll

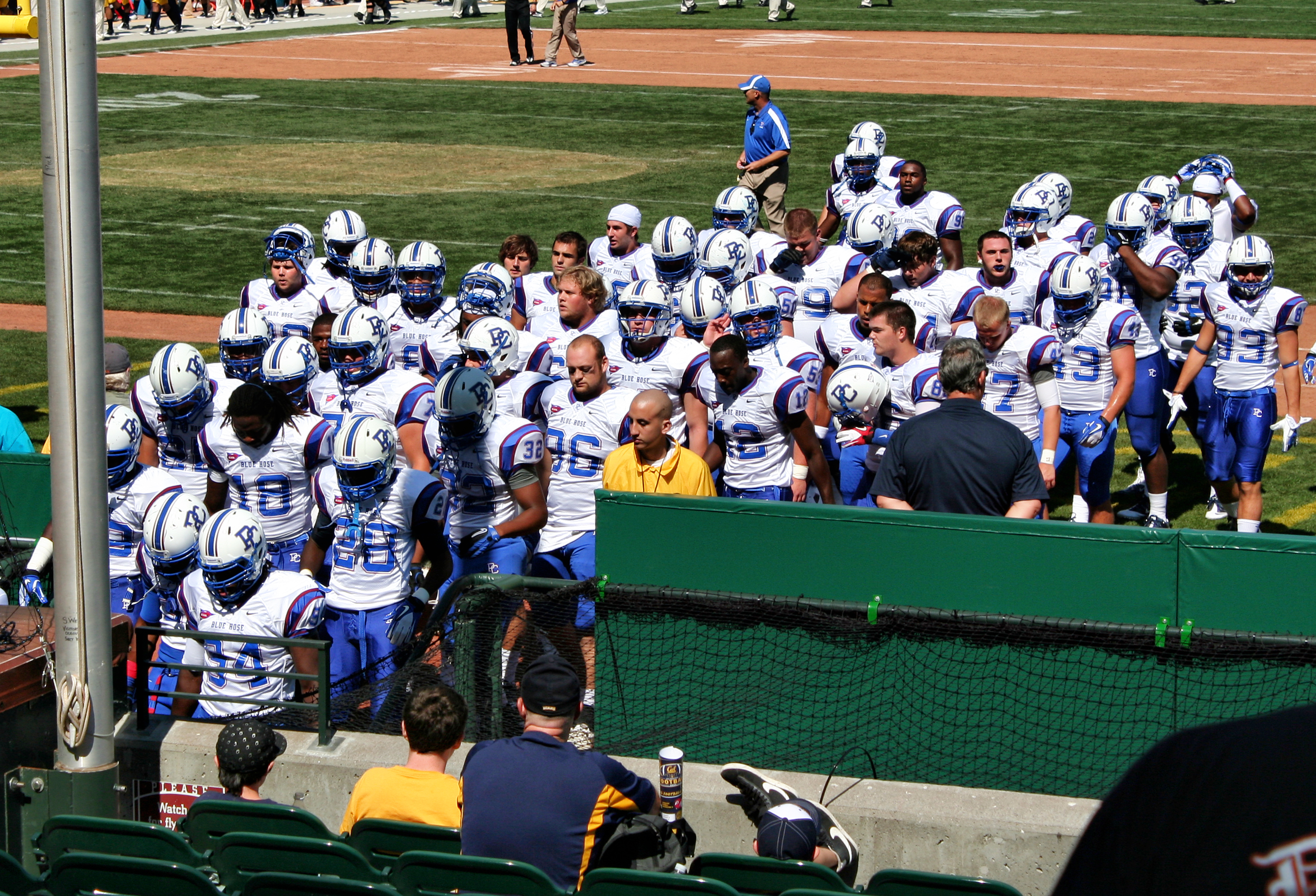
Presbyterian leaves the field during their game against California

The 2011 Presbyterian Blue Hose football team represented Presbyterian College in the 2011 NCAA Division I FCS football season. The Blue Hose were led by third-year head coach Harold Nichols and played their home games at Bailey Memorial Stadium. They are a member of the Big South Conference. They finished the season 4–7, 3–3 in Big South play to finish in a tie for third place.

== Schedule ==
Date	Time	Opponent	Site	TV	Result	Attendance
September 3	1:30 pm	No. 8 Wofford*	Bailey Memorial Stadium; Clinton, SC		L 28–35	5,108
September 10	1:30 pm	North Greenville*	Bailey Memorial Stadium; Clinton, SC		W 38–21	4,012
September 17	5:30 pm	at California*	AT&T Park; San Francisco, CA		L 12–63	33,952
September 24	1:00 pm	at Furman*	Paladin Stadium; Greenville, SC	CSS	L 21–62	12,139
October 8	6:00 pm	at Stony Brook	Kenneth P. LaValle Stadium; Stony Brook, NY		L 24–42	4,103
October 15	2:00 pm	Gardner–Webb^{†}	Bailey Memorial Stadium; Clinton, SC	ESPN3	W 28–14	5,364
October 22	2:00 pm	at No. 1 Georgia Southern*	Paulson Stadium; Statesboro, GA		L 14–48	16,392
October 29	3:30 pm	at No. 23 Liberty	Williams Stadium; Lynchburg, VA	ESPN3	L 20–27 ^{2OT}	11,673
November 5	6:00 pm	at Coastal Carolina	Brooks Stadium; Conway, SC		L 8–15	8,927
November 12	1:00 pm	VMI	Bailey Memorial Stadium; Clinton, SC		W 38–6	4,003
November 19	1:00 pm	Charleston Southern	Bailey Memorial Stadium; Clinton, SC	ESPN3	W 45–14	4,308
*Non-conference game; ^{†}Homecoming; Rankings from The Sports Network Poll released prior to the game; All times are in Eastern time
