= Erling Theller =

American football and basketball coach

Biographical details
- Born: November 28, 1887
- Died: February 20, 1953 (aged 65)
- Education: Oberlin (1913)

Coaching career (HC unless noted)

Football
- 1914: Presbyterian
- 1921–1926: Glenville HS (OH)

Basketball
- 1927–1930: John Carroll

Head coaching record
- Overall: 4–1–1 (college football); 19–23 (college basketball)

Erling C. Theller (December 28, 1887 – February 20, 1953) was an American football and basketball coach. He served as the head football coach at Presbyterian College in Clinton, South Carolina in 1914, compiling a record of 4–1–1. Theller was a 1913 graduate of Oberlin College in Oberlin, Ohio. He later coached high school football at Glenville High School in Cuyahoga County, Ohio, where he coached future National Football League (NFL) star Benny Friedman. Theller was also the head basketball coach at John Carroll University in University Heights, Ohio from 1927 to 1930, tallying a mark of 19–23.

== Head coaching record ==
=== College football ===
Year	Team	Overall	Conference	Standing	Bowl/playoffs
Presbyterian Blue Hose (Independent) (1914)
1914	Presbyterian	4–1–1			
Presbyterian:		4–1–1			
Total:		4–1–1			
