= Elliott Poss =

American football coach

Biographical details
- Born: c. 1948; Wilkes County, Georgia, U.S.
- Died: February 14, 2006 (aged 57); Athens, Georgia, U.S.
- Education: Presbyterian; Georgia

Coaching career (HC unless noted)
- 1975–1984: Presbyterian (assistant)
- 1985–1990: Presbyterian

Head coaching record
- Overall: 29–38–1
- Tournaments: 1–1 (NAIA D-I playoffs)

Elliott Poss (c. 1948 – February 14, 2006) was an American football coach. He served as the head football coach at Presbyterian College in Clinton, South Carolina from 1985 to 1990, compiling a record of 29–38–1. Poss was an assistant as Presbyterian from 1975 to 1984. During his stints as head coach, he mentored future Presbyterian head coach Harold Nichols.

== Head coaching record ==
Year	Team	Overall	Conference	Standing	Bowl/playoffs
Presbyterian Blue Hose (South Atlantic Conference) (1985–1990)
1985	Presbyterian	7–3–1	4–2–1	T–3rd	
1986	Presbyterian	5–6	3–4	T–5th	
1987	Presbyterian	8–5	5–2	2nd	L NAIA Division I Quarterfinal
1988	Presbyterian	3–8	1–6	8th	
1989	Presbyterian	4–7	3–4	6th	
1990	Presbyterian	2–9	2–5	T–6th	
Presbyterian:		29–38–1	18–23–1		
Total:		29–38–1			
