= John Perry (American football, born 1950) =

American football coach

Biographical details
- Born: c. 1950

Playing career
- 1969–1971: Presbyterian

Coaching career (HC unless noted)
- 1975–1981: Presbyterian (assistant)
- 1982–1983: Furman (DE/LB/ST)
- 1984–1990: Lenoir–Rhyne
- 1991–1996: Presbyterian

Head coaching record
- Overall: 64–79

Accomplishments and honors

Championships
- 1 SAC-8 (1988)

John Perry (born c. 1950) is an American former football coach. He served as the head football coach at Lenoir–Rhyne University from 1984 to 1990 and Presbyterian College from 1991 to 1996, compiling a career college football coaching record of 64–79. Perry played college football at Presbyterian, from which he graduated in 1972.

== Head coaching record ==
Year	Team	Overall	Conference	Standing	Bowl/playoffs
Lenoir–Rhyne Bears (SAC-8 / South Atlantic Conference) (1984–1990)
1984	Lenoir–Rhyne	1–10	1–6	7th	
1985	Lenoir–Rhyne	3–8	1–6	8th	
1986	Lenoir–Rhyne	4–7	1–6	8th	
1987	Lenoir–Rhyne	7–4	3–4	T–5th	
1988	Lenoir–Rhyne	8–3	5–2	T–1st	
1989	Lenoir–Rhyne	5–6	4–3	T–2nd	
1990	Lenoir–Rhyne	7–4	4–3	3rd	
Lenoir–Rhyne:		35–42			
Presbyterian Blue Hose (South Atlantic Conference) (1991–1996)
1991	Presbyterian	4–7	3–4	T–4th	
1992	Presbyterian	4–7	3–4	T–4th	
1993	Presbyterian	5–6	4–3	T–3rd	
1994	Presbyterian	5–6	2–5	T–6th	
1995	Presbyterian	6–5	4–3	T–3rd	
1996	Presbyterian	5–6	4–3	T–3rd	
Presbyterian:		29–37	21–21		
Total:		64–79			
National championship Conference title Conference division title or championship game berth
