= South Carolina Little Three =

Defunct intercollegiate athletic conference

The South Carolina Little Three (known as the South Carolina Little Four from 1946 to 1951) was an intercollegiate athletic conference that existed from 1946 to 1964. The conference's three main members, Newberry College, Presbyterian College, and Wofford College, were located in the state of South Carolina.

== History ==
The three primary members of the conference were Newberry College, Presbyterian College, and Wofford College. All three teams now play in different leagues: Newberry in the South Atlantic (Division II), Presbyterian in the Big South (FCS), and Wofford in the SoCon (FCS).

Erskine College was also a member from 1946 until 1951, when it dropped its football program. Erskine resumed its football program in 2020, and competes as an independent in Division II; it some other sports it is a member of Conference Carolinas.

The College of Charleston was also a member of the South Carolina Little Five in basketball, but the post-season basketball tournament was always for the South Carolina Little Four, as the College of Charleston was not invited. The College of Charleston is now a member of the Colonial Athletic Association.

== Members ==
- The following is an incomplete list of the membership of the South Carolina Little Four Conference.

Institution	Location	Founded	Nickname	Joined	Left	Current conference
College of Charleston	Charleston, South Carolina	1770	Cougars	1946	1953	Coastal Athletic Association
Erskine College	Due West, South Carolina	1839	Flying Fleet	1946	1951 (football); 1962	Conference Carolinas
Newberry College	Newberry, South Carolina	1856	Wolves	1946	1964	South Atlantic
Presbyterian College	Clinton, South Carolina	1851	Blue Hose	1946	1964	Big South
Wofford College	Spartanburg, South Carolina	1854	Terriers	1946	1964	Southern

== Football champions ==
- 1946 – Presbyterian
- 1947 – Presbyterian and Newberry
- 1948 – Wofford
- 1949 – Wofford
- 1950 – Wofford
- 1951 – Wofford
- 1952 – Wofford
- 1953 – Newberry and Presbyterian
- 1954 – Wofford
- 1955 – Newberry
- 1956 – Wofford
- 1957 – Wofford
- 1958 – Presbyterian
- 1959 – Presbyterian
- 1960 – Presbyterian
- 1961 – Wofford
- 1962 – Newberry, Presbyterian, and Wofford
- 1963 – Wofford
- 1964 – Wofford

=== Basketball champions ===
Season	Regular season champion
1947	Wofford
1948	Wofford
1949	Erskine†
1950	Erskine
1951	Presbyterian
1952	Wofford
1953	Wofford
1954	Erskine
1955	Presbyterian
1956	Erskine
1957	Erskine and Presbyterian
1958	Newberry
1959	Newberry, Presbyterian, and Wofford
1960	Wofford†
1961	Newberry†
1962	Erskine

Season	Postseason tournament champion
1947	No postseason tournament
1948	No postseason tournament
1949	No postseason tournament
1950	Erskine
1951	Presbyterian
1952	Presbyterian
1953	Wofford
1954	Erskine
1955	Presbyterian
1956	Presbyterian
1957	Erskine
1958	Erskine
1959	Wofford
1960	Wofford†
1961	Newberry†
1962	Newberry

† = Qualified to the NAIA Men's Basketball Championships

== See also ==
- List of defunct college football conferences
