= Matt Rahl =

American college football player and coach

Current position
- Title: Head coach
- Team: Presbyterian
- Conference: Pioneer
- Record: 0–0

Playing career
- 1999–2001: Missouri Southern State
- Position: Tight end

Coaching career (HC unless noted)
- 2002: Missouri Southern State (SA)
- 2003–2004: Winona State (GA)
- 2005–2006: Winona State (OL/STC)
- 2007–2008: Missouri (GA)
- 2009–2010: Wyoming (RC)
- 2011–2012: Wyoming (RC/DL)
- 2013: Wyoming (RC)
- 2014–2016: McKendree (OC/OL)
- 2017: McKendree (AHC/OC)
- 2018: UTEP (RC)
- 2019: UTEP (OQC)
- 2020: Missouri Southern State (AHC/OC/OL)
- 2021–2023: Missouri Southern State (AHC/OC)
- 2024–2025: Presbyterian (OL/RGC/RC)
- 2026–present: Presbyterian

Head coaching record
- Overall: 0–0

Matt Rahl is an American college football coach. He is the head coach of the Presbyterian Blue Hose of Presbyterian College in Clinton, South Carolina, a position he has held since 2026. He was promoted after two years on Presbyterian's staff offensive line coach and run game coordinator following the departure of Steve Englehart following the 2025 season.

== Head coaching record ==
Year	Team	Overall	Conference	Standing	Bowl/playoffs
Presbyterian Blue Hose (Pioneer Football League) (2026–present)
2026	Presbyterian	0–0	0–0		
Presbyterian:		0–0	0–0		
Total:		0–0			
