= Presbyterian Blue Hose football =

American college football program

2026 Presbyterian Blue Hose football team
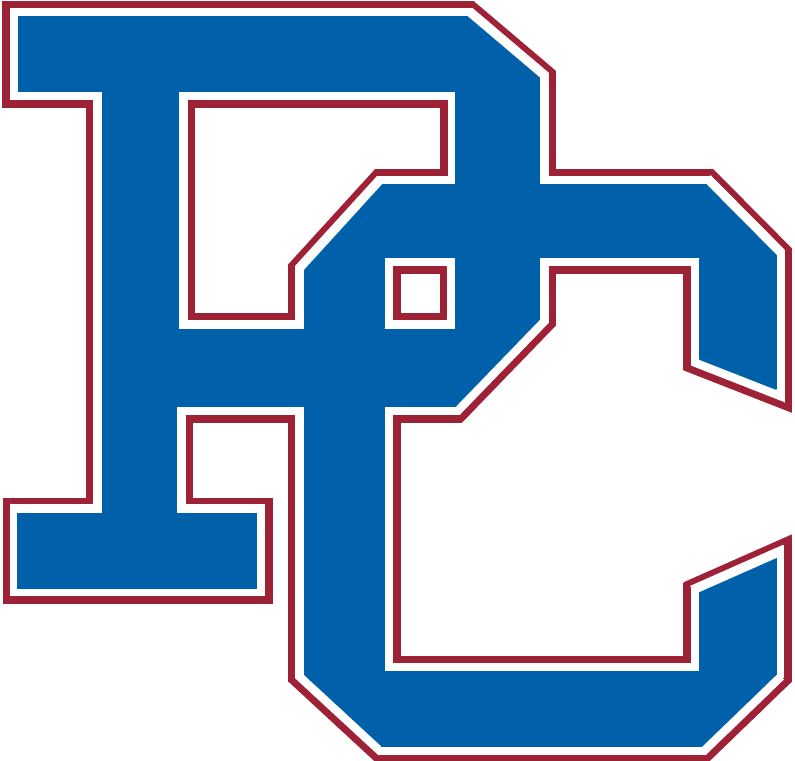
- First season: 1913; 113 years ago
- Athletic director: Dee Nichols
- Head coach: Matt Rahl; 1st season, 1–0 (1.000)
- Location: Clinton, South Carolina
- Stadium: Bailey Memorial Stadium (capacity: 6,500)
- NCAA division: Division I FCS
- Conference: Pioneer Football League
- Colors: Blue and garnet
- All-time record: 534–560–35 (.488)
- Bowl record: 0–1 (.000)

Conference championships
- SAC: 2005
- Rivalries: Newberry Wolves (Bronze Derby)
- Website: GoBlueHose.com

The Presbyterian Blue Hose football program is the intercollegiate American football team for Presbyterian College located in the U.S. state of South Carolina. The team competes in the NCAA Division I Football Championship Subdivision (FCS); while Presbyterian is a full member of the Big South Conference, it plays football in the Pioneer Football League. The current head coach is Matt Rahl, who was hired in December 2025 to replace Steve Englehart. Presbyterian's first football team was fielded in 1913. The team plays its home games at the 6,500 seat Bailey Memorial Stadium in Clinton, South Carolina. The Blue Hose began a transition to non-scholarship football in 2017 and left Big South football after the 2019 season, while otherwise remaining a full Big South member. The Blue Hose football program played the 2020–21 season as an independent and joined the Pioneer League in July 2021 upon completion of its transition.

== History ==
The Presbyterian Blue Hose name originates from the blue stockings the players wore in the early 1900s.

=== Classifications ===
- 1938–1950: NCAA College Division
- 1951–1956: Unknown
- 1957–1969: NAIA
- 1970–1992: NAIA Division I
- 1993–2010: NCAA Division II
- 2011–present: NCAA Division I FCS

=== Conference memberships ===
- 1913–1920: Independent
- 1921–1941: Southern Intercollegiate Athletic Association
- 1942–1945: Independent
- 1946–1964: South Carolina Little Three
- 1964–1972: Carolinas Conference
- 1973–1974: NAIA independent
- 1975–2006: South Atlantic Conference
- 2007: NCAA Division II Independent
- 2008–2019: Big South Conference
- 2020: Division I FCS Independent
- Presbyterian played the 2020–21 season in a scheduling agreement with the Pioneer Football League. It was not eligible for the conference title, but was eligible for individual awards and honors.
- 2021–present: Pioneer Football League

See also List of Presbyterian Blue Hose football seasons

== Presbyterian vs. in-state NCAA Division I schools ==
School	Record	Percentage	Streak	First Meeting	Last Meeting
Charleston Southern	14–10	.583	Lost 2	1993	2016
Clemson	3–33–4	.125	Lost 15	1916	2010
Coastal Carolina	1–9	.100	Lost 9	2007	2016
Furman	13–42–1	.237	Won 2	1913	2025
South Carolina	3–12	.200	Lost 8	1915	1945
South Carolina State	0–2	.000	Lost 2	1989	1990
The Citadel	11–50–1	.185	Lost 12	1915	2010
Wofford	41–40–3	.506	Won 1	1914	2023
Presbyterian 85 – In-State NCAA Division I Schools 198 – Ties 9

== Notable former players ==
- Justin Bethel, cornerback and special teams player for the New England Patriots
- Rock Ya-Sin, cornerback for the Detroit Lions
- Bob Waters, quarterback for the San Francisco 49ers

== Playoff appearances ==
=== NCAA Division II ===
The Blue Hose made one appearances in the Division II playoffs, with a combined record of 0–1.

Year	Round	Opponent	Result
2005	Second Round	Central Arkansas	L, 28–52

=== NAIA ===
The Blue Hose appeared in the NAIA playoffs two times. Their combined record was 2–2.

Year	Round	Opponent	Result
1979	Quarterfinals; Semifinals	Saginaw Valley State; Central State (OK)	W, 36–3; L, 6–28
1987	First Round; Quarterfinals	Concord; Pittsburg State	W, 57–0; L, 21–42

== Bowl games ==
Presbyterian has participated in one bowl game, with the Blue Hose having a record of 0–1

Season	Coach	Bowl	Opponent	Result
1959	Frank Jones	Tangerine Bowl	Middle Tennessee	L 12–21

== Future non-conference opponents ==
Announced schedules as of March 17, 2026.

2026	2027
UVA Wise	at Murray State
at Mercer	
at Western Carolina	
