= 2011 Central Connecticut Blue Devils football team =

American college football season

2011 Central Connecticut Blue Devils football
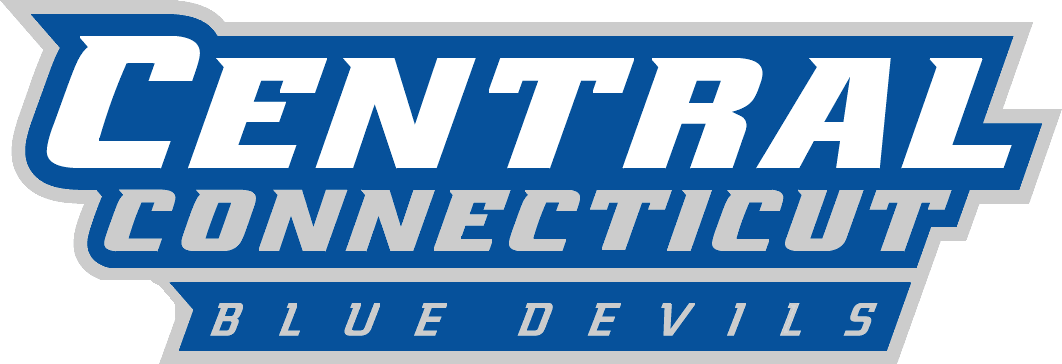
- Conference: Northeast Conference
- Record: 4–7 (3–5 NEC)
- Head coach: Jeff McInerney (6th season)
- Offensive coordinator: Tim Stowers (2nd season)
- Co-offensive coordinator: Adam Lechtenberg (2nd season)
- Home stadium: Arute Field

2011 Northeast Conference football standings
	Conf.			Overall
Team	W		L	W		L
Duquesne +	7	–	1	9	–	2
Albany +^	7	–	1	8	–	4
Bryant	5	–	3	7	–	4
Monmouth	4	–	4	5	–	6
Wagner	4	–	4	4	–	7
Sacred Heart	3	–	5	5	–	6
Central Connecticut	3	–	5	4	–	7
Robert Morris	2	–	6	2	–	9
Saint Francis (PA)	1	–	7	2	–	9
+ – Conference co-champions; ^ – FCS playoff participant

The 2011 Central Connecticut Blue Devils football team represented Central Connecticut State University as a member of the Northeast Conference (NEC) in the 2011 NCAA Division I FCS football season. The Blue Devils were led by sixth-year head coach Jeff McInerney and played their home games at Arute Field. They finished the season 4–7 overall and 3–5 in NEC play to tie for sixth place.

== Schedule ==
Date	Time	Opponent	Site	Result	Attendance
September 3	12:00 p.m.	Southern Connecticut State*	Arute Field; New Britain, CT	W 35–21	4,058
September 10	6:00 p.m.	at No. 19 James Madison*	Bridgeforth Stadium; Harrisonburg, VA	L 9–14	25,102
September 17	1:00 p.m.	at Wagner	Wagner College Stadium; Staten Island, NY	W 28–24	2,357
September 24	12:00 p.m.	Monmouth	Arute Field; New Britain, CT	L 12–24	2,936
October 1	12:00 p.m.	Sacred Heart	Arute Field; New Britain, CT	L 24–37	3,617
October 8	6:00 p.m.	at UMass*	Warren McGuirk Alumni Stadium; Hadley, MA	L 26–42	11,736
October 15	12:00 p.m.	at Duquesne	Arthur J. Rooney Athletic Field; Pittsburgh, PA	L 21–28	2,211
October 22	12:00 p.m.	Albany	Arute Field; New Britain, CT	L 35–63	3,112
October 29	1:00 p.m.	at Saint Francis (PA)	DeGol Field; Loretto, PA	L 13–27	522
November 5	12:00 p.m.	Robert Morris	Arute Field; New Britain, CT	W 31–24	2,125
November 19	12:00 p.m.	at Bryant	Bulldog Stadium; Smithfield, RI	W 42–21	1,812
*Non-conference game; Rankings from The Sports Network Poll released prior to the game; All times are in Eastern time
