= 2011 Cornell Big Red football team =

American college football season

2011 Cornell Big Red football
- Conference: Ivy League
- Record: 5–5 (3–4 Ivy)
- Head coach: Kent Austin (2nd season)
- Offensive coordinator: Jeff Fela (2nd season)
- Defensive coordinator: Ron McCrone (2nd season)
- Captains: Bob Bullington; Rashad Campbell; Brad Greenway; Zack Imhoff; Jeff Mathews; Luke Tasker
- Home stadium: Schoellkopf Field

2011 Ivy League football standings
	Conf.			Overall
Team	W		L	W		L
No. 16 Harvard $	7	–	0	9	–	1
Brown	4	–	3	7	–	3
Dartmouth	4	–	3	5	–	5
Penn	4	–	3	5	–	5
Yale	4	–	3	5	–	5
Cornell	3	–	4	5	–	5
Columbia	1	–	6	1	–	9
Princeton	1	–	6	1	–	9
$ – Conference champion; Rankings from The Sports Network poll

The 2011 Cornell Big Red football team represented Cornell University in the 2011 NCAA Division I FCS football season as a member of the Ivy League. They were led by second-year head coach Kent Austin and played their home games at Schoellkopf Field. Cornell finished the season 5–5 overall and 3–4 in Ivy League play to place sixth. Cornell averaged 7,145 fans per game.

== Schedule ==
Date	Time	Opponent	Site	TV	Result	Attendance
September 17	6:00 p.m.	Bucknell*	Schoellkopf Field; Ithaca, NY		W 24–13	14,032
September 24	12:00 p.m.	at Yale	Yale Bowl; New Haven, CT	Versus	L 17–37	14,345
October 1	12:30 p.m.	Wagner*	Schoellkopf Field; Ithaca, NY		W 31–7	4,244
October 8	12:30 p.m.	Harvard	Schoellkopf Field; Ithaca, NY		L 31–41	6,471
October 15	1:00 p.m.	at Colgate*	Andy Kerr Stadium; Hamilton, NY (rivalry)		L 28–35 ^{OT}	3,817
October 22	12:30 p.m.	Brown	Schoellkopf Field; Ithaca, NY		L 24–35	4,851
October 29	1:00 p.m.	at Princeton	Powers Field at Princeton Stadium; Princeton, NJ		W 24–7	5,036
November 5	1:30 p.m.	at Dartmouth	Memorial Field; Hanover, NH (rivalry)		L 33–24	3,137
November 12	12:30 p.m.	Columbia	Schoellkopf Field; Ithaca, NY (rivalry)		W 62–41	6,128
November 19	1:00 p.m.	at Penn	Franklin Field; Philadelphia, PA (rivalry)		W 48–38	7,609
*Non-conference game; All times are in Eastern time

== Game summaries ==
=== vs Bucknell ===
	1	2	3	4	Total
Bison	0	7	6	0	13
Big Red	10	0	7	7	24

=== at Yale ===
	1	2	3	4	Total
Big Red	0	3	14	0	17
Bulldogs	17	0	13	7	37

=== vs Wagner ===
	1	2	3	4	Total
Seahawks	0	0	0	7	7
Big Red	7	17	7	0	31

=== vs Harvard ===
	1	2	3	4	Total
Crimson	7	13	7	14	41
Big Red	7	10	7	7	31

=== at Colgate ===
	1	2	3	4	OT	Total
Big Red	3	7	7	11	0	28
Raiders	7	7	14	0	7	35

=== vs Brown ===
	1	2	3	4	Total
Bears	7	14	14	0	35
Big Red	10	3	3	8	24

=== at Princeton ===
	1	2	3	4	Total
Big Red	3	7	7	7	24
Tigers	0	7	0	0	7

=== at Dartmouth ===
	1	2	3	4	Total
Big Red	0	7	10	7	24
Big Green	10	6	7	10	33

=== vs Columbia ===
	1	2	3	4	Total
Lions	7	27	0	7	41
Big Red	7	21	17	17	62

=== at Penn ===
	1	2	3	4	Total
Big Red	14	7	13	14	48
Quakers	14	10	7	7	38

== Roster ==
2011 Cornell Big Red football team roster
Players
Coaches
Offense

Pos.	#	Name	Class
OL	79	J. C. Tretter	Jr
WR	88	Davis Austin	So

Defense

Pos.	#	Name	Class

Special teams

Pos.	#	Name	Class

Head coach

- Kent Austin

Coordinators/assistant coaches

Legend

- (C) Team captain
- (S) Suspended
- (I) Ineligible
- Injured
- Redshirt

Roster
