= 2011 Yale Bulldogs football team =

American college football season

2011 Yale Bulldogs football
- Conference: Ivy League
- Record: 5–5 (4–3 Ivy)
- Head coach: Tom Williams (3rd season)
- Offensive coordinator: Brian Stark (3rd season)
- Co-offensive coordinator: Kefense Hynson (3rd season)
- Defensive coordinator: Ikaika Malloe (3rd season)
- Home stadium: Yale Bowl

2011 Ivy League football standings
	Conf.			Overall
Team	W		L	W		L
No. 16 Harvard $	7	–	0	9	–	1
Brown	4	–	3	7	–	3
Dartmouth	4	–	3	5	–	5
Penn	4	–	3	5	–	5
Yale	4	–	3	5	–	5
Cornell	3	–	4	5	–	5
Columbia	1	–	6	1	–	9
Princeton	1	–	6	1	–	9
$ – Conference champion; Rankings from The Sports Network poll

The 2011 Yale Bulldogs football team represented Yale University in the 2011 NCAA Division I FCS football season. The Bulldogs were led by third-year head coach Tom Williams and played their home games at the Yale Bowl. They are a member of the Ivy League. They finished the season 5–5, 4–3 in Ivy League play to finish in a tie for second place. Yale averaged 23,729 fans per game.

== Schedule ==
Date	Time	Opponent	Site	TV	Result	Attendance
September 17	12:00 p.m.	Georgetown*	Yale Bowl; New Haven, CT		W 37–27	12,246
September 24	12:00 p.m.	Cornell	Yale Bowl; New Haven, CT	Versus	W 37–17	14,345
October 1	12:30 p.m.	at No. 13 Lehigh*	Goodman Stadium; Bethlehem, PA	2 Sports	L 7–37	6,072
October 8	12:00 p.m.	Dartmouth	Yale Bowl; New Haven, CT		W 30–0	17,786
October 15	6:00 p.m.	at Lafayette*	Fisher Stadium; Easton, PA	MASN/ESPN3	L 19–28	4,872
October 22	12:00 p.m.	at Penn	Franklin Field; Philadelphia, PA	Versus	L 25–37	11,413
October 29	12:30 p.m.	at Columbia	Wien Stadium; New York, NY	YES Network	W 16–13	1,209
November 5	12:00 p.m.	Brown	Yale Bowl; New Haven, CT	YES Network	L 28–34	19,134
November 12	12:00 p.m.	at Princeton	Powers Field at Princeton Stadium; Princeton, NJ (rivalry)	YES Network	W 33–24	10,001
November 19	12:00 p.m.	No. 18 Harvard	Yale Bowl; New Haven, CT (rivalry)	Versus	L 7–45	55,137
*Non-conference game; Rankings from The Sports Network Poll released prior to the game; All times are in Eastern time
