= 2011 Wagner Seahawks football team =

American college football season

2011 Wagner Seahawks football
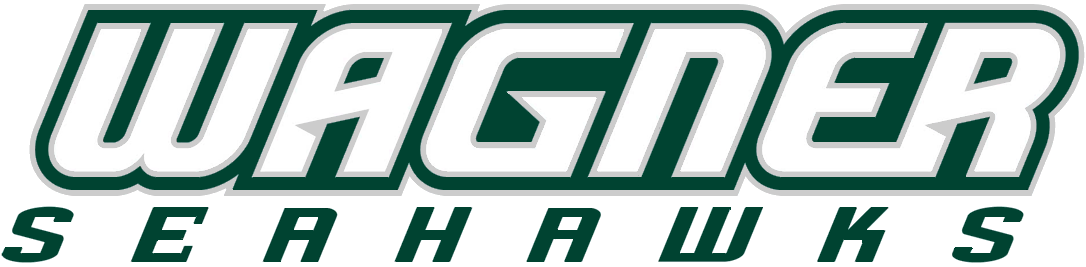
- Conference: Northeast Conference
- Record: 4–7 (4–4 NEC)
- Head coach: Walt Hameline (31st season)
- Defensive coordinator: Tony Brinson (1st season)
- Home stadium: Wagner College Stadium

2011 Northeast Conference football standings
	Conf.			Overall
Team	W		L	W		L
Duquesne +	7	–	1	9	–	2
Albany +^	7	–	1	8	–	4
Bryant	5	–	3	7	–	4
Monmouth	4	–	4	5	–	6
Wagner	4	–	4	4	–	7
Sacred Heart	3	–	5	5	–	6
Central Connecticut	3	–	5	4	–	7
Robert Morris	2	–	6	2	–	9
Saint Francis (PA)	1	–	7	2	–	9
+ – Conference co-champions; ^ – FCS playoff participant

The 2011 Wagner Seahawks football team represented Wagner College in the 2011 NCAA Division I FCS football season as a member of the Northeast Conference (NEC). The Seahawks were led by 31st-year head coach Walt Hameline and played their home games at Wagner College Stadium. Wagner finished the season 4–7 overall and 4–4 in NEC play to tie for fourth place.

== Schedule ==
Date	Time	Opponent	Site	Result	Attendance
September 3	1:00 p.m.	Saint Francis (PA)	Wagner College Stadium; Staten Island, NY	W 38–28	2,087
September 10	1:00 p.m.	at No. 9 Richmond*	E. Claiborne Robins Stadium; Richmond, VA	L 6–21	8,700
September 17	1:00 p.m.	Central Connecticut	Wagner College Stadium; Staten Island, NY	L 24–28	2,357
September 24	1:00 p.m.	at Bryant	Bulldog Stadium; Smithfield, RI	L 28–30	4,217
October 1	1:00 p.m.	at Cornell*	Schoellkopf Field; Ithaca, NY	L 7–31	4,244
October 8	1:00 p.m.	Georgetown*	Wagner College Stadium; Staten Island, NY	L 10–24	2,267
October 22	1:00 p.m.	at Duquesne	Arthur J. Rooney Athletic Field; Pittsburgh, PA	L 21–37	2,098
October 29	1:00 p.m.	Albany	Wagner College Stadium; Staten Island, NY	L 0–24	1,012
November 5	1:00 p.m.	Sacred Heart	Wagner College Stadium; Staten Island, NY	W 27–21	1,735
November 12	Noon	at Robert Morris	Joe Walton Stadium; Moon Township, PA	W 38–17	2,237
November 19	1:00 p.m.	at Monmouth	Kessler Field; West Long Branch, NJ	W 44–29	1,584
*Non-conference game; Rankings from Coaches' Poll released prior to the game; All times are in Eastern time
