= 2011 Saint Francis Red Flash football team =

American college football season

2011 Saint Francis Red Flash football
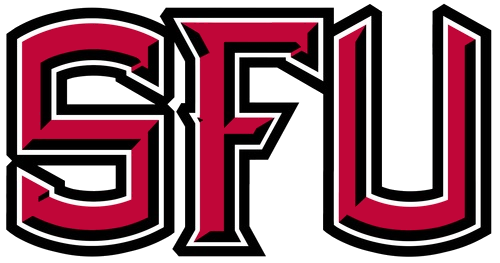
- Conference: Northeast Conference
- Record: 2–9 (1–7 NEC)
- Head coach: Chris Villarrial (2nd season)
- Offensive coordinator: Ralph DelSardo (2nd season)
- Defensive coordinator: Ralph Clark (2nd season)
- Home stadium: DeGol Field

2011 Northeast Conference football standings
	Conf.			Overall
Team	W		L	W		L
Duquesne +	7	–	1	9	–	2
Albany +^	7	–	1	8	–	4
Bryant	5	–	3	7	–	4
Monmouth	4	–	4	5	–	6
Wagner	4	–	4	4	–	7
Sacred Heart	3	–	5	5	–	6
Central Connecticut	3	–	5	4	–	7
Robert Morris	2	–	6	2	–	9
Saint Francis (PA)	1	–	7	2	–	9
+ – Conference co-champions; ^ – FCS playoff participant

The 2011 Saint Francis Red Flash football team represented Saint Francis University in the 2011 NCAA Division I FCS football season. The Red Flash were led by second year head coach Chris Villarrial and played their home games at DeGol Field. They are a member of the Northeast Conference. They finished the season 2–9, 1–7 in NEC play to finish in last place.

== Schedule ==
Date	Time	Opponent	Site	TV	Result	Attendance	Source
September 3	1:00 p.m.	at Wagner	Wagner College Stadium; Staten Island, NY		L 28–38	2,087	
September 10	7:00 p.m.	at No. 11 North Dakota State*	Fargodome; Fargo, ND		L 3–56	18,341	
September 17	1:00 p.m.	Morehead State*	DeGol Field; Loretto, PA		W 50–49	1,585	
September 24	7:00 p.m.	Duquesne	DeGol Field; Loretto, PA	MSG Plus	L 14–41	2,361	
October 1	1:00 p.m.	Albany	DeGol Field; Loretto, PA		L 20–41	868	
October 8	7:00 p.m.	at Robert Morris	Joe Walton Stadium; Moon Township, PA		L 14–45	4,384	
October 15	12:00 p.m.	at Sacred Heart	Campus Field; Fairfield, CT		L 45–60	1,169	
October 22	4:00 p.m.	at Youngstown State*	Stambaugh Stadium; Youngstown, OH		L 23–49	11,313	
October 29	1:00 p.m.	Central Connecticut	DeGol Field; Loretto, PA		W 27–13	522	
November 5	1:00 p.m.	Monmouth	DeGol Field; Loretto, PA		L 45–48	1,712	
November 12	12:00 p.m.	at Bryant	Bulldog Stadium; Smithfield, RI		L 34–45	1,476	
*Non-conference game; Rankings from The Sports Network Poll released prior to the game; All times are in Eastern time
