= 2011 Colgate Raiders football team =

American college football season

2011 Colgate Raiders football
- Conference: Patriot League
- Record: 5–6 (2–4 Patriot)
- Head coach: Dick Biddle (16th season)
- Offensive coordinator: Dan Hunt (6th season)
- Co-defensive coordinators: Pat Foley (2nd season); Ryan Knowles (3rd season)
- Captains: Nate Eachus; Chris DiMassa
- Home stadium: Andy Kerr Stadium

2011 Patriot League football standings
	Conf.			Overall
Team	W		L	W		L
No. 6 Lehigh $^	6	–	0	11	–	2
Georgetown	4	–	2	8	–	3
Holy Cross	4	–	2	6	–	5
Bucknell	3	–	3	6	–	5
Colgate	2	–	4	5	–	6
Lafayette	2	–	4	4	–	7
Fordham	0	–	6	1	–	10
$ – Conference champion; ^ – FCS playoff participant; Fordham was ineligible for conference title because they offered football scholarships while other Patriot League members did not.; Rankings from The Sports Network poll

The 2011 Colgate Raiders football team represented Colgate University in the 2011 NCAA Division I FCS football season a member of the Patriot League. The Raiders were led by 16th-year head coach Dick Biddle and played their home games at Andy Kerr Stadium. Colgate finished the season 5–6 overall and 2–4 in Patriot League play to tie for fifth place.

== Schedule ==
Date	Time	Opponent	Site	TV	Result	Attendance
September 3	6:00 pm	Albany*	Andy Kerr Stadium; Hamilton, NY		W 37–34 ^{OT}	6,748
September 10	1:00 pm	at Holy Cross	Fitton Field; Worcester, MA		L 7–37	5,092
September 17	1:30 pm	at Dartmouth*	Memorial Field; Hanover, NH		L 20–37	5,616
September 24	7:00 pm	at Towson*	Johnny Unitas Stadium; Towson, MD		L 17–42	9,919
October 1	1:00 pm	Fordham	Andy Kerr Stadium; Hamilton, NY		W 38–14	2,345
October 8	1:00 pm	at Monmouth*	Kessler Field; West Long Branch, NJ		W 26–14	3,452
October 15	1:00 pm	Cornell*^{†}	Andy Kerr Stadium; Hamilton, NY (rivalry)		W 35–28 ^{OT}	3,817
October 22	2:00 pm	at Georgetown	Multi-Sport Field; Washington, D.C.		L 17–40	3,215
October 29	12:00 pm	No. 7 Lehigh	Andy Kerr Stadium; Hamilton, NY	CBSSN	L 25–45	4,218
November 5	6:00 pm	at Lafayette	Fisher Stadium; Easton, PA		L 24–37 ^{OT}	5,129
November 19	1:00 pm	Bucknell	Andy Kerr Stadium; Hamilton, NY		W 21–6	1,787
*Non-conference game; ^{†}Homecoming; Rankings from The Sports Network Poll released prior to the game; All times are in Eastern time
