= 2011 Morehead State Eagles football team =

American college football season

2011 Morehead State Eagles football
- Conference: Pioneer Football League
- Record: 3–8 (2–6 PFL)
- Head coach: Matt Ballard (18th season)
- Offensive coordinator: Rob Tenyer (1st season)
- Defensive coordinator: John Gilliam
- Home stadium: Jayne Stadium

2011 Pioneer Football League standings
	Conf.			Overall
Team	W		L	W		L
San Diego +	7	–	1	9	–	2
Drake +	7	–	1	9	–	2
Jacksonville	6	–	2	7	–	4
Campbell	5	–	3	6	–	5
Dayton	4	–	4	6	–	5
Marist	3	–	5	4	–	7
Butler	3	–	5	5	–	6
Davidson	2	–	6	4	–	7
Morehead State	2	–	6	3	–	8
Valparaiso	1	–	7	1	–	10
+ – Conference co-champions

The 2011 Morehead State Eagles football team represented Morehead State University in the 2011 NCAA Division I FCS football season. The Eagles were led by 18th-year head coach Matt Ballard and played their home games at Jayne Stadium. They are a member of the Pioneer Football League. They finished the season 3–8, 2–6 in PFL play to finish the season in a tie for eighth place.

== Schedule ==
Date	Time	Opponent	Site	Result	Attendance
September 1	7:00 pm	Kentucky Christian*	Jayne Stadium; Morehead, KY	W 67–0	6,046
September 10	7:30 pm	at Illinois State*	Hancock Stadium; Normal, IL	L 21–52	8,003
September 17	1:00 pm	at Saint Francis (PA)*	DeGol Field; Loretto, PA	L 49–50	1,585
September 24	12:30 pm	San Diego	Jayne Stadium; Morehead, KY	L 44–48	5,730
October 1	2:00 pm	at Valparaiso	Brown Field; Valparaiso, IN	W 38–14	2,654
October 8	1:00 pm	at Drake	Jayne Stadium; Morehead, KY	L 26–41	4,377
October 15	1:00 pm	at Jacksonville	D. B. Milne Field; Jacksonville, FL	L 14–50	3,105
October 22	1:00 pm	Dayton^{†}	Jayne Stadium; Morehead, KY	L 28–30	8,464
November 5	1:00 pm	at Campbell	Barker–Lane Stadium; Buies Creek, NC	L 31–41	3,417
November 12	1:00 pm	at Davidson	Richardson Stadium; Davidson, NC	L 24–28	3,507
November 19	1:00 pm	Butler	Jayne Stadium; Morehead, KY	W 55–35	3,613
*Non-conference game; ^{†}Homecoming; All times are in Eastern time
