= 2011 Davidson Wildcats football team =

American college football season

2011 Davidson Wildcats football
- Conference: Pioneer Football League
- Record: 4–7 (2–6 PFL)
- Head coach: Tripp Merritt (7th season)
- Offensive coordinator: Matt Mumme (1st season)
- Defensive coordinator: Meade Clendaniel
- Home stadium: Richardson Stadium

2011 Pioneer Football League standings
	Conf.			Overall
Team	W		L	W		L
San Diego +	7	–	1	9	–	2
Drake +	7	–	1	9	–	2
Jacksonville	6	–	2	7	–	4
Campbell	5	–	3	6	–	5
Dayton	4	–	4	6	–	5
Marist	3	–	5	4	–	7
Butler	3	–	5	5	–	6
Davidson	2	–	6	4	–	7
Morehead State	2	–	6	3	–	8
Valparaiso	1	–	7	1	–	10
+ – Conference co-champions

The 2011 Davidson Wildcats football team represented Davidson College in the 2011 NCAA Division I FCS football season. The Wildcats were led by seventh-year head coach Tripp Merritt and played their home games at Richardson Stadium. They are a member of the Pioneer Football League. They finished the season 4–7, 2–6 in PFL play to finish in a tie for eighth place.

== Schedule ==
Date	Time	Opponent	Site	Result	Attendance
September 3	6:00 pm	at Georgetown*	Multi-Sport Field; Washington, D.C.	L 16–40	2,384
September 10	7:00 pm	Lenoir–Rhyne*	Richardson Stadium; Davidson, NC	W 28–10	4,742
September 24	7:00 pm	Johnson C. Smith*	Richardson Stadium; Davidson, NC	W 35–7	4,691
October 1	6:00 pm	at San Diego	Torero Stadium; San Diego, CA	L 0–42	3,764
October 8	1:00 pm	Marist	Richardson Stadium; Davidson, NC	L 9–13	3,046
October 15	1:00 pm	at Dayton	Welcome Stadium; Dayton, OH	L 0–28	2,514
October 22	1:00 pm	at Jacksonville	D. B. Milne Field; Jacksonville, FL	L 13–56	4,214
October 29	1:00 pm	Campbell	Richardson Stadium; Davidson, NC	L 20–26 ^{3OT}	4,509
November 5	12:00 pm	at Butler	Butler Bowl; Indianapolis, IN	L 7–17	2,731
November 12	1:00 pm	Morehead State	Richardson Stadium; Davidson, NC	W 28–24	3,507
November 19	1:00 pm	Valparaiso	Richardson Stadium; Davidson, NC	W 30–22	3,312
*Non-conference game; All times are in Eastern time
