= 2011 Bucknell Bison football team =

American college football season

2011 Bucknell Bison football
- Conference: Patriot League
- Record: 6–5 (3–3 Patriot)
- Head coach: Joe Susan (2nd season)
- Offensive coordinator: Bryan Bossard (2nd season)
- Defensive coordinator: Clayton Carlin (2nd season)
- Home stadium: Christy Mathewson–Memorial Stadium

2011 Patriot League football standings
	Conf.			Overall
Team	W		L	W		L
No. 6 Lehigh $^	6	–	0	11	–	2
Georgetown	4	–	2	8	–	3
Holy Cross	4	–	2	6	–	5
Bucknell	3	–	3	6	–	5
Colgate	2	–	4	5	–	6
Lafayette	2	–	4	4	–	7
Fordham	0	–	6	1	–	10
$ – Conference champion; ^ – FCS playoff participant; Fordham was ineligible for conference title because they offered football scholarships while other Patriot League members did not.; Rankings from The Sports Network poll

The 2011 Bucknell Bison football team represented Bucknell University as a member of the Patriot League during the 2011 NCAA Division I FCS football season. Led by second-year head coach Joe Susan, the Bison compiled an overall record of 6–5 with a mark of 3–3 in conference play, placing fourth in the Patriot League. Bucknell played home games at Christy Mathewson–Memorial Stadium in Lewisburg, Pennsylvania.

== Schedule ==
Date	Time	Opponent	Site	Result	Attendance
September 3	6:00 pm	Duquesne*	Christy Mathewson–Memorial Stadium; Lewisburg, PA	W 27–26	6,054
September 10	6:00 pm	Marist*	Christy Mathewson–Memorial Stadium; Lewisburg, PA	W 28–14	3,244
September 17	6:00 pm	at Cornell*	Schoellkopf Field; Ithaca, NY	L 13–24	14,032
September 24	6:00 pm	at Princeton*	Powers Field at Princeton Stadium; Princeton, NJ	W 34–9	8,063
October 1	1:00 pm	Georgetown	Christy Mathewson–Memorial Stadium; Lewisburg, PA	W 35–18	2,132
October 8	1:00 pm	Lehigh	Christy Mathewson–Memorial Stadium; Lewisburg, PA	L 6–30	3,119
October 15	1:00 pm	at Harvard*	Harvard Stadium; Boston, MA	L 3–42	16,236
October 22	1:00 pm	Holy Cross	Christy Mathewson–Memorial Stadium; Lewisburg, PA	L 13–16	6,734
October 29	6:00 pm	at Lafayette	Fisher Stadium; Easton, PA	W 39–13	3,604
November 12	1:00 pm	at Fordham	Coffey Field; Bronx, NY	W 21–0	2,754
November 19	1:00 pm	at Colgate	Andy Kerr Stadium; Hamilton, NY	L 6–21	1,787
*Non-conference game; All times are in Eastern time
