= Jeff McInerney =

American football player and coach (born 1960)

Biographical details
- Born: June 22, 1960 (age 66); Bethlehem, Pennsylvania, U.S.

Playing career
- 1978–1980: Slippery Rock
- Position: Linebacker

Coaching career (HC unless noted)
- 1981–1982: Slippery Rock (GA)
- 1983–1987: Troy State (LB)
- 1988: Southern Illinois (LB)
- 1989: UTEP (LB/RC)
- 1990–1991: Georgia Southern (co-DC / LB)
- 1992–1993: Rice (DE)
- 1994–1995: Duke (DC/DE/LB)
- 1996–1997: USC (DL)
- 1998: Oregon State (DE)
- 1999: UNLV (DC)
- 2000–2001: Tulsa (AHC/DC)
- 2002: Tulsa (LB/ST)
- 2003: North Dakota State (DL)
- 2004–2005: Rhode Island (DC)
- 2006–2013: Central Connecticut State / Central Connecticut
- 2014-2015: Henderson State (co-DC / DL / ST)
- 2016–2018: Indiana (QC)
- 2019: San Antonio Commanders (DL/ST)
- 2020: New York Guardians (ST/DQC)
- 2022: New Jersey Generals (DQC/ST)

Head coaching record
- Overall: 48–41
- Bowls: 0–1

Accomplishments and honors

Championships
- 2 NEC (2009–2010)

Jeff McInerney (born June 22, 1960) is an American professional football coach and former player who was most recently the defensive quality control and special teams coordinator for the New Jersey Generals of the United States Football League (USFL). He served as head football coach at Central Connecticut State University (CCSU) from 2006 to 2013, compiling a record of 48–41.

== Coaching career ==
McInerney is an alumnus of Slippery Rock University. He began his coaching career at his alma mater as an undergraduate in 1981, followed by one season as a graduate assistant coach in 1982. McInerney subsequently served as an assistant coach at Troy University, Georgia Southern University, the University of Tulsa, the University of Nevada, Las Vegas, Oregon State University, Duke University, the University of Southern California and the University of Rhode Island.

In January 2006, McInerney was named the head coach at Central Connecticut State University located in New Britain, Connecticut, becoming the 12th football coach at the school. He held that position for eight seasons, until his resignation in November 2013. His coaching record at Central Connecticut was 48–41 (.539). He resigned his position at the end of the season, citing a desire to move on to another opportunity, adding "There are things, at 53, that I want to do".

In 2014, McInerney became the defensive line and special teams coach for Henderson State. In 2015 he served as the co-Defensive Coordinator. In 2016, McInerney became a Quality Control assistant for the Indiana Hoosiers.

In 2018, McInerney was named as the defensive line and special teams coach for the San Antonio Commanders of the Alliance of American Football.

McInerney joined the New York Guardians of the XFL in 2019.

== Head coaching record ==
| Year | Team | Overall | Conference | Standing | Bowl/playoffs |
|---|---|---|---|---|---|
Central Connecticut State / Central Connecticut Blue Devils (Northeast Conference) (2006–2013)
| 2006 | Central Connecticut State | 8–3 | 4–3 | 5th | |
| 2007 | Central Connecticut State | 6–5 | 4–2 | 2nd | |
| 2008 | Central Connecticut State | 7–4 | 4–3 | T–3rd | |
| 2009 | Central Connecticut State | 9–3 | 7–1 | 1st | L Gridiron Classic |
| 2010 | Central Connecticut State | 8–3 | 7–1 | T–1st | |
| 2011 | Central Connecticut | 4–7 | 3–5 | T–6th | |
| 2012 | Central Connecticut | 2–8 | 2–5 | 8th | |
| 2013 | Central Connecticut | 4–8 | 2–4 | T–6th | |
| Central Connecticut: | | 48–41 | | | |
| Total: | | 48–41 | | | |
