= 2011 Lafayette Leopards football team =

American college football season

2011 Lafayette Leopards football
- Conference: Patriot League
- Record: 4–7 (2–4 Patriot)
- Head coach: Frank Tavani (12th season)
- Offensive coordinator: Mickey Fein (3rd season)
- Offensive scheme: Multiple
- Defensive coordinator: John Loose (12th season)
- Base defense: 4–3
- Home stadium: Fisher Stadium

2011 Patriot League football standings
| | Conf. | | | Overall |
| Team | W | | L | W | | L |
|---|---|---|---|---|---|---|
| No. 6 Lehigh $^ | 6 | – | 0 | 11 | – | 2 |
| Georgetown | 4 | – | 2 | 8 | – | 3 |
| Holy Cross | 4 | – | 2 | 6 | – | 5 |
| Bucknell | 3 | – | 3 | 6 | – | 5 |
| Colgate | 2 | – | 4 | 5 | – | 6 |
| Lafayette | 2 | – | 4 | 4 | – | 7 |
| Fordham | 0 | – | 6 | 1 | – | 10 |
$ – Conference champion; ^ – FCS playoff participant; Fordham was ineligible for conference title because they offered football scholarships while other Patriot League members did not.; Rankings from The Sports Network poll

The 2011 Lafayette Leopards football team represented Lafayette College as member of the Patriot League during the 2011 NCAA Division I FCS football season. Led by 12th-year head coach Frank Tavani, the Leopards compiled an overall record of 4–7 with a mark of 2–4 in conference play, tying for fifth place in the Patriot League. Lafayette played home games at Fisher Field in Easton, Pennsylvania.

Lafayette's season opener at North Dakota State was the furthest west the program had ever traveled, and was the Leopards' first contest played indoors since the 1930 team faced Washington & Jefferson at the Convention Hall in Atlantic City, New Jersey.

== Schedule ==
| Date | Time | Opponent | Site | TV | Result | Attendance | Source |
|---|---|---|---|---|---|---|---|
| September 3 | 7:00 pm | at No. 11 North Dakota State* | Fargodome; Fargo, ND | | L 6–42 | 17,023 | |
| September 10 | 6:00 pm | at Georgetown | Multi-Sport Field; Washington, DC | | L 13–14 | 2,435 | |
| September 17 | 6:00 pm | at Penn* | Franklin Field; Philadelphia, PA | LSN/MASN | W 37–12 | 9,438 | |
| September 24 | 6:00 pm | at Stony Brook* | Kenneth P. LaValle Stadium; Stony Brook, NY | LSN/MASN | L 20–37 | 8,278 | |
| October 1 | 6:00 pm | Harvard* | Fisher Stadium; Easton, PA | LSN/MASN | L 3–31 | 4,512 | |
| October 15 | 6:00 pm | Yale* | Fisher Stadium; Easton, PA | LSN/MASN | W 28–19 | 4,872 | |
| October 22 | 1:00 pm | Fordham | Fisher Stadium; Easton, PA | LSN/MASN | W 45–24 | 5,567 | |
| October 29 | 6:00 pm | Bucknell | Fisher Stadium; Easton, PA | LSN/MASN | L 13–39 | 3,604 | |
| November 5 | 6:00 pm | Colgate | Fisher Stadium; Easton, PA | LSN/MASN | W 37–24 ^{OT} | 5,129 | |
| November 12 | 12:30 pm | at Holy Cross | Fitton Field; Worcester, MA | LSN/MASN | L 24–29 | 4,281 | |
| November 19 | 12:30 pm | at No. 6 Lehigh | Goodman Stadium; Bethlehem, PA (The Rivalry) | ESPN3 | L 13–37 | 16,013 | |
*Non-conference game; Rankings from The Sports Network Poll released prior to the game; All times are in Eastern time
