= 2011 Campbell Fighting Camels football team =

American college football season

2011 Campbell Fighting Camels football
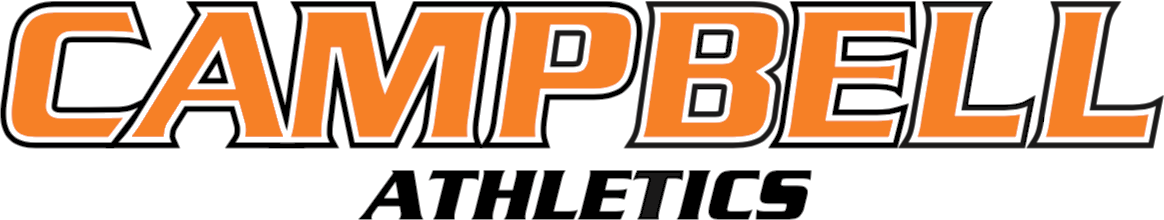
- Conference: Pioneer Football League
- Record: 6–5 (5–3 PFL)
- Head coach: Dale Steele (4th season)
- Offensive coordinator: Oscar Olejniczak (4th season)
- Defensive coordinator: Art Link (4th season)
- Home stadium: Barker–Lane Stadium

2011 Pioneer Football League standings
	Conf.			Overall
Team	W		L	W		L
San Diego +	7	–	1	9	–	2
Drake +	7	–	1	9	–	2
Jacksonville	6	–	2	7	–	4
Campbell	5	–	3	6	–	5
Dayton	4	–	4	6	–	5
Marist	3	–	5	4	–	7
Butler	3	–	5	5	–	6
Davidson	2	–	6	4	–	7
Morehead State	2	–	6	3	–	8
Valparaiso	1	–	7	1	–	10
+ – Conference co-champions

The 2011 Campbell Fighting Camels football team represented Campbell University in the 2011 NCAA Division I FCS football season. The Fighting Camels were led by fourth-year head coach Dale Steele and played their home games at Barker–Lane Stadium. They are a member of the Pioneer Football League. They finished the season 6–5, 5–3 in PFL play to finish in fourth place.

== Schedule ==
Date	Time	Opponent	Site	Result	Attendance
September 3	6:00 pm	at Old Dominion*	Foreman Field; Norfolk, VA	L 14–41	19,818
September 10	1:00 pm	Apprentice*	Barker–Lane Stadium; Buies Creek, NC	W 76–0	3,566
September 24	1:00 pm	Jacksonville	Barker–Lane Stadium; Buies Creek, NC	L 21–57	3,752
October 1	2:00 pm	at Drake	Drake Stadium; Des Moines, IA	L 14–31	2,427
October 8	12:00 pm	Butler	Barker–Lane Stadium; Buies Creek, NC	W 38–23	1,644
October 15	12:00 pm	at Marist	Tenney Stadium at Leonidoff Field; Poughkeepsie, NY	W 35–21	1,208
October 22	1:00 pm	San Diego^{†}	Barker–Lane Stadium; Buies Creek, NC	W 48–24	3,103
October 29	1:00 pm	at Davidson	Richardson Stadium; Davidson, NC	W 26–20 ^{3OT}	4,509
November 5	1:00 pm	Morehead State	Barker–Lane Stadium; Buies Creek, NC	W 41–31	3,417
November 12	2:00 pm	at Valparaiso	Brown Field; Valparaiso, IN	L 31–34	1,073
November 19	1:00 pm	at Georgia State*	Georgia Dome; Atlanta, GA	L 35–42	11,125
*Non-conference game; ^{†}Homecoming; All times are in Eastern time
