= 2011 Lehigh Mountain Hawks football team =

American college football season

2011 Lehigh Mountain Hawks football

Patriot League champion Lambert Cup winner

FCS Playoffs Quarterfinal, L 0–24 vs. North Dakota State
- Conference: Patriot League

Ranking
- Sports Network: No. 6
- FCS Coaches: No. 6
- Record: 11–2 (6–0 Patriot)
- Head coach: Andy Coen (6th season)
- Offensive coordinator: Dave Cecchini (2nd season)
- Defensive coordinator: Dave Kotulski (6th season)
- Home stadium: Goodman Stadium

2011 Patriot League football standings
	Conf.			Overall
Team	W		L	W		L
No. 6 Lehigh $^	6	–	0	11	–	2
Georgetown	4	–	2	8	–	3
Holy Cross	4	–	2	6	–	5
Bucknell	3	–	3	6	–	5
Colgate	2	–	4	5	–	6
Lafayette	2	–	4	4	–	7
Fordham	0	–	6	1	–	10
$ – Conference champion; ^ – FCS playoff participant; Fordham was ineligible for conference title because they offered football scholarships while other Patriot League members did not.; Rankings from The Sports Network poll

The 2011 Lehigh Mountain Hawks football team represented Lehigh University in the 2011 NCAA Division I FCS football season. The Mountain Hawks were led by sixth-year head coach Andy Coen and played their home games at Goodman Stadium. They are a member of the Patriot League. They finished the season 11–2, 6–0 in Patriot League play to win the conference championship. They received the conference's automatic bid into the FCS playoffs where they defeated Towson in the second round before falling to North Dakota State in the quarterfinals.

== Schedule ==
Date	Time	Opponent	Rank	Site	TV	Result	Attendance	Source
September 3	1:00 p.m.	at Monmouth*	No. 13	Kessler Field; West Long Branch, NJ		W 49–24	3,265	
September 10	12:30 p.m.	No. 13 New Hampshire*	No. 14	Goodman Stadium; Bethlehem, PA	2 Sports	L 41–48 ^{OT}	7,519	
September 17	6:00 p.m.	at Princeton*	No. 16	Powers Field at Princeton Stadium; Princeton, NJ	WFMZ/FCS	W 34–22	6,704	
September 24	12:30 p.m.	Liberty*	No. 15	Goodman Stadium; Bethlehem, PA	2 Sports	W 27–24	6,185	
October 1	12:30 p.m.	Yale*	No. 13	Goodman Stadium; Bethlehem, PA	2 Sports	W 37–7	6,072	
October 8	1:00 p.m.	at Bucknell	No. 10	Christy Mathewson–Memorial Stadium; Lewisburg, PA		W 30–6	3,119	
October 15	1:00 p.m.	at Fordham	No. 8	Coffey Field; The Bronx, NY		W 34–12	5,994	
October 29	12:00 p.m.	at Colgate	No. 7	Andy Kerr Stadium; Hamilton, NY	CBSSN	W 45–25	4,218	
November 5	12:30 p.m.	Holy Cross	No. 8	Goodman Stadium; Bethlehem, PA	2 Sports	W 14–7	9,250	
November 12	12:30 p.m.	Georgetown	No. 6	Goodman Stadium; Bethlehem, PA	2 Sports	W 34–12	6,044	
November 19	12:30 p.m.	Lafayette	No. 6	Goodman Stadium; Bethlehem, PA (The Rivalry)	WFMZ/FCS	W 37–13	16,013	
December 3	3:30 p.m.	at No. 8 Towson*	No. 6	Johnny Unitas Stadium; Towson, MD (FCS Second Round)	ESPN3	W 40–38	11,196	
December 10	4:00 p.m.	at No. 4 North Dakota State*	No. 6	Fargodome; Fargo, ND (FCS Quarterfinal)	ESPN3	L 0–24	18,111	
*Non-conference game; Rankings from The Sports Network Poll released prior to the game; All times are in Eastern time
