= 2011 Dayton Flyers football team =

American college football season

2011 Dayton Flyers football
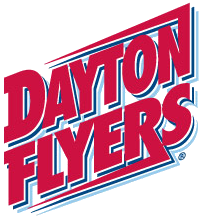
- Conference: Pioneer Football League
- Record: 6–5 (4–4 PFL)
- Head coach: Rick Chamberlin (4th season)
- Offensive coordinator: Dave Whilding (29th season)
- Defensive coordinator: Landon Fox (2nd season)
- MVP: Taylor Harris
- Home stadium: Welcome Stadium

2011 Pioneer Football League standings
	Conf.			Overall
Team	W		L	W		L
San Diego +	7	–	1	9	–	2
Drake +	7	–	1	9	–	2
Jacksonville	6	–	2	7	–	4
Campbell	5	–	3	6	–	5
Dayton	4	–	4	6	–	5
Marist	3	–	5	4	–	7
Butler	3	–	5	5	–	6
Davidson	2	–	6	4	–	7
Morehead State	2	–	6	3	–	8
Valparaiso	1	–	7	1	–	10
+ – Conference co-champions

The 2011 Dayton Flyers football team represented the University of Dayton as a member of the Pioneer Football League (PFL) during the 2011 NCAA Division I FCS football season. Led by fourth-year head coach Rick Chamberlin, the Flyers compiled an overall record of 6–5 with a mark of 4–4 in conference play, placing fifth in the PFL. Dayton played home games at Welcome Stadium in Dayton, Ohio. Taylor Harris was awarded White-Allen Most Valuable Player Trophy.

== Schedule ==
Date	Time	Opponent	Site	Result	Attendance
September 3	12:00 pm	at Robert Morris*	Joe Walton Stadium; Moon Township, PA	W 19–13	1,981
September 10	1:00 pm	Duquesne*	Welcome Stadium; Dayton, OH	L 13–22	2,887
September 17	1:00 pm	Marist	Welcome Stadium; Dayton, OH	W 24–10	2,592
September 24	1:30 pm	at Central State*	McPherson Stadium; Wilberforce, OH	W 17–7	1,200
October 1	1:00 pm	Butler	Welcome Stadium; Dayton, OH	L 27–29	3,438
October 8	12:00 pm	at Jacksonville	D. B. Milne Field; Jacksonville, FL	L 26–34	2,837
October 15	1:00 pm	Davidson	Welcome Stadium; Dayton, OH	W 28–0	2,514
October 22	1:00 pm	at Morehead State	Jayne Stadium; Morehead, KY	W 30–28	8,464
October 29	2:00 pm	at Valparaiso	Brown Field; Valparaiso, IN	W 49–10	1,243
November 5	1:00 pm	San Diego	Welcome Stadium; Dayton, OH	L 28–31	4,580
November 12	2:00 pm	at Drake	Drake Stadium; Des Moines, IA (rivalry)	L 14–37	2,387
*Non-conference game; All times are in Eastern time
