= 2011 San Diego Toreros football team =

American college football season

2011 San Diego Toreros football

PFL co-champion
- Conference: Pioneer Football League
- Record: 9–2 (7–1 PFL)
- Head coach: Ron Caragher (5th season)
- Offensive coordinator: Tanner Engstrand (1st season)
- Defensive coordinator: Jon Sumrall (2nd season)
- Home stadium: Torero Stadium

2011 Pioneer Football League standings
| | Conf. | | | Overall |
| Team | W | | L | W | | L |
|---|---|---|---|---|---|---|
| San Diego + | 7 | – | 1 | 9 | – | 2 |
| Drake + | 7 | – | 1 | 9 | – | 2 |
| Jacksonville | 6 | – | 2 | 7 | – | 4 |
| Campbell | 5 | – | 3 | 6 | – | 5 |
| Dayton | 4 | – | 4 | 6 | – | 5 |
| Marist | 3 | – | 5 | 4 | – | 7 |
| Butler | 3 | – | 5 | 5 | – | 6 |
| Davidson | 2 | – | 6 | 4 | – | 7 |
| Morehead State | 2 | – | 6 | 3 | – | 8 |
| Valparaiso | 1 | – | 7 | 1 | – | 10 |
+ – Conference co-champions

The 2011 San Diego Toreros football team represented the University of San Diego as a member of the Pioneer Football League (PFL) during the 2011 NCAA Division I FCS football season. Led by fifth-year head coach Ron Caragher, the Toreros compiled an overall record of 9–2 with a mark of 7–1 in conference play, sharing the PFL title with Drake. The team played home games at Torero Stadium in San Diego.

== Schedule ==
| Date | Time | Opponent | Site | Result | Attendance |
|---|---|---|---|---|---|
| September 3 | 6:00 pm | at Azusa Pacific* | Cougar Stadium; Azusa, CA | W 42–40 | 6,124 |
| September 10 | 6:00 pm | Western New Mexico* | Torero Stadium; San Diego, CA | W 30–10 | 3,198 |
| September 17 | 6:00 pm | at UC Davis* | Aggie Stadium; Davis, CA | L 3–31 | 10,129 |
| September 24 | 9:30 am | at Morehead State | Jayne Stadium; Morehead, KY | W 48–44 | 5,730 |
| October 1 | 3:00 pm | Davidson^{†} | Torero Stadium; San Diego, CA | W 42–0 | 3,764 |
| October 8 | 11:00 am | at Valparaiso | Brown Field; Valparaiso, IN | W 55–14 | 2,073 |
| October 15 | 1:00 pm | Drake | Torero Stadium; San Diego, CA | W 31–24 | 2,529 |
| October 22 | 10:00 am | at Campbell | Barker–Lane Stadium; Buies Creek, NC | L 24–48 | 3,103 |
| November 5 | 10:00 am | at Dayton | Welcome Stadium; Dayton, OH | W 31–28 | 4,580 |
| November 12 | 1:00 pm | Marist | Torero Stadium; San Diego, CA | W 13–7 | 2,018 |
| November 19 | 1:00 pm | Jacksonville | Torero Stadium; San Diego, CA | W 23–14 | 2,771 |
*Non-conference game; ^{†}Homecoming; All times are in Pacific time
