= 2011 Princeton Tigers football team =

American college football season

2011 Princeton Tigers football
- Conference: Ivy League
- Record: 1–9 (1–6 Ivy)
- Head coach: Bob Surace (2nd season)
- Offensive coordinator: James Perry (2nd season)
- Offensive scheme: Spread option
- Defensive coordinator: Jared Backus (3rd season)
- Base defense: 4–3
- Home stadium: Powers Field at Princeton Stadium

2011 Ivy League football standings
	Conf.			Overall
Team	W		L	W		L
No. 16 Harvard $	7	–	0	9	–	1
Brown	4	–	3	7	–	3
Dartmouth	4	–	3	5	–	5
Penn	4	–	3	5	–	5
Yale	4	–	3	5	–	5
Cornell	3	–	4	5	–	5
Columbia	1	–	6	1	–	9
Princeton	1	–	6	1	–	9
$ – Conference champion; Rankings from The Sports Network poll

The 2011 Princeton Tigers football team represented Princeton University in the 2011 NCAA Division I FCS football season. The Tigers were led by second-year head coach Bob Surace and played their home games at Powers Field at Princeton Stadium. They are a member of the Ivy League. They finished the season 1–9 overall and 1–6 in Ivy League play to tie for seventh place. Princeton averaged 7,194 fans per game.

== Schedule ==
Date	Time	Opponent	Site	TV	Result	Attendance
September 17	6:00 p.m.	No. 16 Lehigh*	Powers Field at Princeton Stadium; Princeton, NJ	FCS Atlantic	L 22–34	6,704
September 24	6:00 p.m.	Bucknell*	Powers Field at Princeton Stadium; Princeton, NJ		L 9–34	8,063
October 1	6:00 p.m.	Columbia	Powers Field at Princeton Stadium; Princeton, NJ		W 24–21	6,168
October 8	1:00 p.m.	at Hampton*	Armstrong Stadium; Hampton, VA		L 23–28	3,016
October 15	12:30 p.m.	at Brown	Brown Stadium; Providence, RI		L 0–34	5,265
October 22	1:00 p.m.	at Harvard	Harvard Stadium; Boston, MA (rivalry)		L 39–56	11,422
October 29	1:00 p.m.	Cornell	Powers Field at Princeton Stadium; Princeton, NJ		L 7–24	5,036
November 5	1:00 p.m.	at Penn	Franklin Field; Philadelphia, PA (rivalry)		L 9–37	17,179
November 12	12:00 p.m.	Yale	Powers Field at Princeton Stadium; Princeton, NJ (rivalry)	YES Network	L 24–33	10,001
November 19	1:30 p.m.	at Dartmouth	Memorial Field; Hanover, NH		L 17–24	4,003
*Non-conference game; Rankings from The Sports Network Poll released prior to the game; All times are in Eastern time
