= 2011 Fordham Rams football team =

American college football season

2011 Fordham Rams football
- Conference: Patriot League
- Record: 1–10 (0–6 Patriot)
- Head coach: Tom Masella (6th season)
- Offensive coordinator: Bryan Volk (3rd season)
- Defensive coordinator: Matt Dawson (2nd season)
- Home stadium: Coffey Field

2011 Patriot League football standings
	Conf.			Overall
Team	W		L	W		L
No. 6 Lehigh $^	6	–	0	11	–	2
Georgetown	4	–	2	8	–	3
Holy Cross	4	–	2	6	–	5
Bucknell	3	–	3	6	–	5
Colgate	2	–	4	5	–	6
Lafayette	2	–	4	4	–	7
Fordham	0	–	6	1	–	10
$ – Conference champion; ^ – FCS playoff participant; Fordham was ineligible for conference title because they offered football scholarships while other Patriot League members did not.; Rankings from The Sports Network poll

The 2011 Fordham Rams football team represented Fordham University in the 2011 NCAA Division I FCS football season. The Rams were led by sixth year head coach Tom Masella and played their home games at Coffey Field. They are a member of the Patriot League.

Fordham was not eligible for the Patriot League championship because they used scholarship players while the rest of the league's members did not.

They finished the season 1–10, 0–6 in Patriot League play to finish in last place.

== Schedule ==
Date	Time	Opponent	Site	TV	Result	Attendance
September 3	12:00 pm	at Connecticut*	Rentschler Field; East Hartford, CT	ESPN3	L 3–35	34,562
September 17	1:00 pm	Columbia*^{†}	Coffey Field; The Bronx, NY (Liberty Cup)		W 21–14	6,820
September 24	1:00 pm	at Rhode Island*	Meade Stadium; Kingston, RI		L 17–21	3,428
October 1	1:00 pm	at Colgate	Andy Kerr Stadium; Hamilton, NY		L 14–38	2,345
October 8	6:00 pm	at Penn*	Franklin Field; Philadelphia, PA		L 20–35	6,217
October 15	1:00 pm	No. 8 Lehigh	Coffey Field; The Bronx, NY		L 12–34	5,994
October 22	1:00 pm	at Lafayette	Fisher Stadium; Easton, PA		L 24–45	5,567
October 29	3:30 pm	at Army*	Michie Stadium; West Point, NY	CBSSN	L 0–55	39,481
November 5	1:00 pm	at Georgetown	Multi-Sport Field; Washington, DC		L 13–30	2,237
November 12	1:00 pm	Bucknell	Coffey Field; The Bronx, NY		L 0–21	2,754
November 19	1:00 pm	Holy Cross	Coffey Field; The Bronx, NY (Ram–Crusader Cup)		L 21–41	3,605
*Non-conference game; ^{†}Homecoming; Rankings from The Sports Network Poll released prior to the game; All times are in Eastern time
