= 2011 Harvard Crimson football team =

American college football season

2011 Harvard Crimson football

Ivy League champion
- Conference: Ivy League

Ranking
- Sports Network: No. 16
- FCS Coaches: No. 14
- Record: 9–1 (7–0 Ivy)
- Head coach: Tim Murphy (18th season)
- Offensive coordinator: Joel Lamb (6th season)
- Offensive scheme: Spread
- Defensive coordinator: Scott Larkee (3rd season)
- Base defense: 4–3
- Home stadium: Harvard Stadium

2011 Ivy League football standings
| | Conf. | | | Overall |
| Team | W | | L | W | | L |
|---|---|---|---|---|---|---|
| No. 16 Harvard $ | 7 | – | 0 | 9 | – | 1 |
| Brown | 4 | – | 3 | 7 | – | 3 |
| Dartmouth | 4 | – | 3 | 5 | – | 5 |
| Penn | 4 | – | 3 | 5 | – | 5 |
| Yale | 4 | – | 3 | 5 | – | 5 |
| Cornell | 3 | – | 4 | 5 | – | 5 |
| Columbia | 1 | – | 6 | 1 | – | 9 |
| Princeton | 1 | – | 6 | 1 | – | 9 |
$ – Conference champion; Rankings from The Sports Network poll

The 2011 Harvard Crimson football team represented Harvard University in the 2011 NCAA Division I FCS football season. The Crimson were led by 18th-year head coach Tim Murphy and played their home games at Harvard Stadium. They were a member of the Ivy League. They finished the season 9–1 overall and 7–0 in Ivy League play to claim the conference championship. Harvard averaged 12,707 fans per game.

== Schedule ==
| Date | Time | Opponent | Rank | Site | TV | Result | Attendance |
|---|---|---|---|---|---|---|---|
| September 17 | 1:00 p.m. | at Holy Cross* | | Fitton Field; Worcester, MA | | L 22–30 | 8,649 |
| September 23 | 7:00 p.m. | Brown | | Harvard Stadium; Boston, MA | | W 24–7 | 18,565 |
| October 1 | 12:30 p.m. | at Lafayette* | | Fisher Stadium; Easton, PA | | W 31–3 | 4,512 |
| October 8 | 12:00 p.m. | at Cornell | | Schoellkopf Field; Ithaca, NY | | W 41–31 | 6,471 |
| October 15 | 12:00 p.m. | Bucknell* | | Harvard Stadium; Boston, MA | | W 42–3 | 16,236 |
| October 22 | 12:00 p.m. | Princeton | | Harvard Stadium; Boston, MA (rivalry) | | W 56–39 | 11,422 |
| October 29 | 6:00 p.m. | Dartmouth | No. 24 | Harvard Stadium; Boston, MA (rivalry) | FCS Atlantic | W 41–10 | 6,029 |
| November 5 | 12:30 p.m. | at Columbia | No. 23 | Wien Stadium; New York, NY | | W 35–21 | 4,153 |
| November 12 | 12:00 p.m. | Penn | No. 18 | Harvard Stadium; Boston, MA (rivalry) | Versus | W 37–20 | 11,283 |
| November 19 | 12:00 p.m. | at Yale | No. 18 | Yale Bowl; New Haven, CT (rivalry) | Versus | W 45–7 | 55,137 |
*Non-conference game; Rankings from The Sports Network Poll released prior to the game; All times are in Eastern time
