= 2011 Penn Quakers football team =

American college football season

2011 Penn Quakers football
- Conference: Ivy League
- Record: 5–5 (4–3 Ivy)
- Head coach: Al Bagnoli (20th season)
- Offensive coordinator: Jon McLaughlin (3rd season)
- Defensive coordinator: Ray Priore (14th season)
- Home stadium: Franklin Field

2011 Ivy League football standings
	Conf.			Overall
Team	W		L	W		L
No. 16 Harvard $	7	–	0	9	–	1
Brown	4	–	3	7	–	3
Dartmouth	4	–	3	5	–	5
Penn	4	–	3	5	–	5
Yale	4	–	3	5	–	5
Cornell	3	–	4	5	–	5
Columbia	1	–	6	1	–	9
Princeton	1	–	6	1	–	9
$ – Conference champion; Rankings from The Sports Network poll

The 2011 Penn Quakers football team represented the University of Pennsylvania in the 2011 NCAA Division I FCS football season. The Quakers were led by 20th-year head coach Al Bagnoli and played their home games at Franklin Field. They were a member of the Ivy League. They finished the season 5–5 overall 4–3 in Ivy League play to tie for second place. Penn averaged 10,321 fans per game.

== Schedule ==
Date	Time	Opponent	Site	TV	Result	Attendance
September 17	6:00 p.m.	Lafayette*	Franklin Field; Philadelphia, PA		L 12–37	9,438
September 24	7:00 p.m.	Villanova*	Franklin Field; Philadelphia, PA		L 21–30	10,071
October 1	6:00 p.m.	at Dartmouth	Memorial Field; Hanover, NH		W 22–20	8,117
October 8	6:00 p.m.	Fordham*	Franklin Field; Philadelphia, PA		W 35–20	6,217
October 15	3:30 p.m.	at Columbia	Wien Stadium; Manhattan, NY	Versus	W 27–20	9,124
October 22	Noon	Yale	Franklin Field; Philadelphia, PA	Versus	W 37–25	11,413
October 29	12:30 p.m.	at Brown	Brown Stadium; Providence, RI		L 0–6	3,403
November 5	1:00 p.m.	Princeton	Franklin Field; Philadelphia, PA (rivalry)		W 37–9	17,179
November 12	Noon	at No. 18 Harvard	Harvard Stadium; Boston, MA (rivalry)	Versus	L 20–37	11,283
November 19	1:00 p.m.	Cornell	Franklin Field; Philadelphia, PA (rivalry)		L 38–48	7,609
*Non-conference game; Rankings from The Sports Network Poll released prior to the game; All times are in Eastern time

== Roster ==
2011 Penn Quakers football team roster
Players
Coaches
Offense

Pos.	#	Name	Class
C	62	Greg Van Roten	Sr
TE	85	Ryan O'Malley	Fr

Defense

Pos.	#	Name	Class
DE	52	Brandon Copeland	Jr

Special teams

Pos.	#	Name	Class

Head coach

- Al Bagnoli

Coordinators/assistant coaches

Legend

- (C) Team captain
- (S) Suspended
- (I) Ineligible
- Injured
- Redshirt

Roster
