= 2011 Holy Cross Crusaders football team =

American college football season

2011 Holy Cross Crusaders football
- Conference: Patriot League
- Record: 6–5 (4–2 Patriot)
- Head coach: Tom Gilmore (8th season)
- Offensive coordinator: Andy McKenzie (4th season)
- Defensive coordinator: Richard Rodgers Sr. (6th season)
- Home stadium: Fitton Field

2011 Patriot League football standings
	Conf.			Overall
Team	W		L	W		L
No. 6 Lehigh $^	6	–	0	11	–	2
Georgetown	4	–	2	8	–	3
Holy Cross	4	–	2	6	–	5
Bucknell	3	–	3	6	–	5
Colgate	2	–	4	5	–	6
Lafayette	2	–	4	4	–	7
Fordham	0	–	6	1	–	10
$ – Conference champion; ^ – FCS playoff participant; Fordham was ineligible for conference title because they offered football scholarships while other Patriot League members did not.; Rankings from The Sports Network poll

The 2011 Holy Cross Crusaders football team represented the College of the Holy Cross in the 2011 NCAA Division I FCS football season. The Crusaders were led by eighth-year head coach Tom Gilmore and played their home games at Fitton Field. They are a member of the Patriot League. They finished the season 6–5, 4–2 in Patriot League play to finish in a tie for second place.

== Schedule ==
Date	Time	Opponent	Site	Result	Attendance
September 1	8:00 pm	No. 25 UMass*	Fitton Field; Worcester, MA	L 16–24	15,942
September 10	1:00 pm	Colgate	Fitton Field; Worcester, MA	W 37–7	5,092
September 17	1:00 pm	Harvard*^{†}	Fitton Field; Worcester, MA	W 30–22	8,649
October 1	12:00 pm	at No. 7 New Hampshire*	Cowell Stadium; Durham, NH	L 32–39	8,307
October 8	12:30 pm	at Brown*	Brown Stadium; Providence, RI	L 13–20	4,009
October 15	1:00 pm	Dartmouth*	Fitton Field; Worcester, MA	W 25–17	4,392
October 22	1:00 pm	at Bucknell	Christy Mathewson–Memorial Stadium; Lewisburg, PA	W 16–13	6,734
October 29	1:00 pm	Georgetown	Fitton Field; Worcester, MA	L 6–19	3,873
November 5	12:30 pm	at No. 8 Lehigh	Goodman Stadium; Bethlehem, PA	L 7–14	9,250
November 12	12:30 pm	Lafayette	Fitton Field; Worcester, MA	W 29–24	4,281
November 19	1:00 pm	at Fordham	Coffey Field; The Bronx, NY (Ram–Crusader Cup)	W 41–21	3,605
*Non-conference game; ^{†}Homecoming; Rankings from The Sports Network Poll released prior to the game; All times are in Eastern time
