= 2011 Jacksonville Dolphins football team =

American college football season

2011 Jacksonville Dolphins football
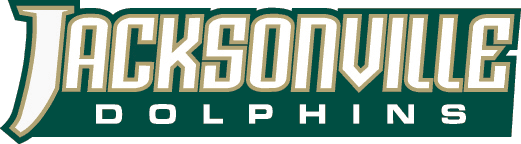
- Conference: Pioneer Football League
- Record: 7–4 (6–2 PFL)
- Head coach: Kerwin Bell (5th season)
- Offensive coordinator: Andy McLeod
- Defensive coordinator: Jerry Odom (2nd season)
- Home stadium: D. B. Milne Field

2011 Pioneer Football League standings
	Conf.			Overall
Team	W		L	W		L
San Diego +	7	–	1	9	–	2
Drake +	7	–	1	9	–	2
Jacksonville	6	–	2	7	–	4
Campbell	5	–	3	6	–	5
Dayton	4	–	4	6	–	5
Marist	3	–	5	4	–	7
Butler	3	–	5	5	–	6
Davidson	2	–	6	4	–	7
Morehead State	2	–	6	3	–	8
Valparaiso	1	–	7	1	–	10
+ – Conference co-champions

The 2011 Jacksonville Dolphins football team represented Jacksonville University in the 2011 NCAA Division I FCS football season. The Dolphins were led by fifth-year head coach Kerwin Bell and played their home games at D. B. Milne Field. They are a member of the Pioneer Football League. They finished the season 7–4, 6–2 in PFL play to finish in third place.

== Schedule ==
Date	Time	Opponent	Site	TV	Result	Attendance
September 3	6:00 p.m.	at The Citadel*	Johnson Hagood Stadium; Charleston, SC		L 9–31	12,099
September 10	4:00 p.m.	at Western Illinois*	Hanson Field; Macomb, IL		L 21–35	10,196
September 17	1:00 p.m.	Charleston Southern*	D. B. Milne Field; Jacksonville, FL		W 37–30	4,185
September 24	1:00 p.m.	at Campbell	Barker–Lane Stadium; Buies Creek, NC		W 57–21	3,752
October 1	12:00 p.m.	at Marist	Tenney Stadium at Leonidoff Field; Poughkeepsie, NY		W 21–9	3,212
October 8	12:00 p.m.	Dayton	D. B. Milne Field; Jacksonville, FL	WCWJ	W 34–26	2,837
October 15	1:00 p.m.	Morehead State	D. B. Milne Field; Jacksonville, FL	WCWJ	W 50–14	3,105
October 22	1:00 p.m.	Davidson^{†}	D. B. Milne Field; Jacksonville, FL	WCWJ	W 56–13	4,214
November 5	2:00 p.m.	at Drake	Drake Stadium; Des Moines, IA		L 24–31	1,867
November 12	12:00 p.m.	Butler	D. B. Milne Field; Jacksonville, FL	WCWJ	W 34–24	3,851
November 19	4:00 p.m.	at San Diego	Torero Stadium; San Diego, CA		L 14–23	2,771
*Non-conference game; ^{†}Homecoming; All times are in Eastern time
