= 2011 Valparaiso Crusaders football team =

American college football season

2011 Valparaiso Crusaders football
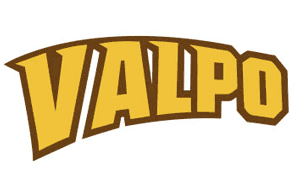
- Conference: Pioneer Football League
- Record: 1–10 (1–7 175)
- Head coach: Dale Carlson (2nd season)
- Offensive coordinator: Bob Muckian (2nd season)
- Defensive coordinator: Tony Pierce (2nd season)
- Home stadium: Brown Field

2011 Pioneer Football League standings
	Conf.			Overall
Team	W		L	W		L
San Diego +	7	–	1	9	–	2
Drake +	7	–	1	9	–	2
Jacksonville	6	–	2	7	–	4
Campbell	5	–	3	6	–	5
Dayton	4	–	4	6	–	5
Marist	3	–	5	4	–	7
Butler	3	–	5	5	–	6
Davidson	2	–	6	4	–	7
Morehead State	2	–	6	3	–	8
Valparaiso	1	–	7	1	–	10
+ – Conference co-champions

The 2011 Valparaiso Crusaders football team represented Valparaiso University as a member of the Pioneer Football League (PFL) during the 2011 NCAA Division I FCS football season. Led by second-year head coach Dale Carlson, the Crusaders compiled an overall record of 1–10 with a mark of 1–7 in conference play, placing last out of ten teams in the PFL. Valparaiso played home games at Brown Field in Valparaiso, Indiana.

== Schedule ==
Date	Time	Opponent	Site	Result	Attendance
September 3	7:00 pm	Franklin (IN)*	Brown Field; Valparaiso, IN	L 35–49	3,847
September 10	3:00 pm	at Youngstown State*	Stambaugh Stadium; Youngstown, OH	L 13–77	14,117
September 17	12:00 pm	at Duquesne*	Arthur J. Rooney Athletic Field; Pittsburgh, PA	L 14–49	1,859
October 1	1:00 pm	Morehead State^{†}	Brown Field; Valparaiso, IN	L 14–38	2,654
October 8	1:00 pm	San Diego	Brown Field; Valparaiso, IN	L 14–55	2,073
October 15	12:00 am	at Butler	Butler Bowl; Indianapolis, IN (Hoosier Helmet Trophy)	L 14–42	1,716
October 22	1:00 pm	at Drake	Drake Stadium; Des Moines, IA	L 0–50	2,145
October 29	1:00 pm	Dayton	Brown Field; Valparaiso, IN	L 10–49	1,243
November 5	12:00 pm	at Marist	Tenney Stadium at Leonidoff Field; Poughkeepsie, NY	L 7–30	1,791
November 12	1:00 pm	Campbell	Brown Field; Valparaiso, IN	W 34–31	1,073
November 19	1:00 pm	at Davidson	Richardson Stadium; Davidson, NC	L 22–30	3,312
*Non-conference game; ^{†}Homecoming; All times are in Eastern time

== Awards ==
- #15 Laurence Treadaway S RSSR: Team's Most Valuable Player, All PFL Honorable Mention (Coaches)
- #44 Gabe Ali-El RB FR: Team's Offensive Player of the Year
- #88 Greg Wood P JR: Team's Special Teams Player of the Year, All PFL 2nd Team (Coaches)
- #84 Tanner Kuramata WR FR: Team's Offensive Rookie of the Year
- #48 Ryan Mundy LB FR: Team's Defensive Rookie of the Year
- #61 Nate Koeneman OL FR: Offensive Scout Player of the Year
- #59 J.T. Rotroff LB FR: Defensive Scout Player of the Year
- #77 Nate Blair OL SR: Richard P. Koenig Award, All PFL Honorable Mention (Coaches), All PFL Academic Team,

ADA Academic All Star Team

- #42 Grant Bushong DL SR: Joe Sever Trophy
- #89 Sean McCarty WR RSSR: All PFL Honorable Mention (Coaches)
- #35 Cody Gokan LB RSJR: All PFL Honorable Mention (Coaches)
- #43 Pat Derbak LB SO: All PFL Honorable Mention (Coaches)
- #97 Nikko Carson DL SR: All PFL Honorable Mention (Coaches)
