= 2011 Marist Red Foxes football team =

American college football season

2011 Marist Red Foxes football
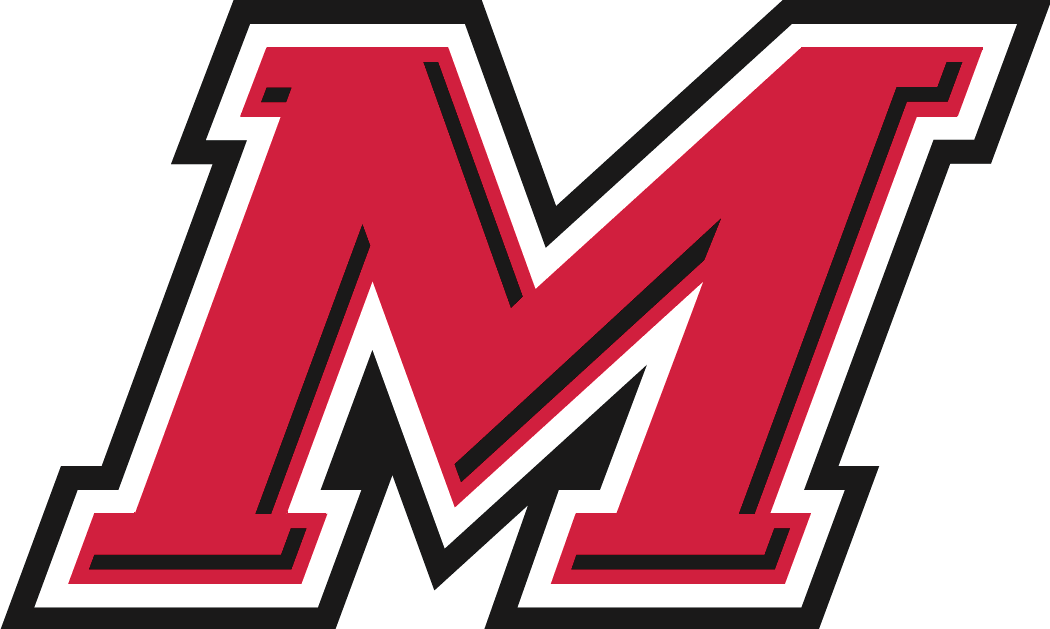
- Conference: Pioneer Football League
- Record: 4–7 (3–5 PFL)
- Head coach: Jim Parady (20th season)
- Defensive coordinator: Scott Rumsey (12th season)
- Home stadium: Tenney Stadium at Leonidoff Field

2011 Pioneer Football League standings
	Conf.			Overall
Team	W		L	W		L
San Diego +	7	–	1	9	–	2
Drake +	7	–	1	9	–	2
Jacksonville	6	–	2	7	–	4
Campbell	5	–	3	6	–	5
Dayton	4	–	4	6	–	5
Marist	3	–	5	4	–	7
Butler	3	–	5	5	–	6
Davidson	2	–	6	4	–	7
Morehead State	2	–	6	3	–	8
Valparaiso	1	–	7	1	–	10
+ – Conference co-champions

The 2011 Marist Red Foxes football team represented Marist College as a member of the Pioneer Football League (PFL) during the 2011 NCAA Division I FCS football season. Led by 20th-year head coach Jim Parady, the Red Foxes compiled an overall record of 4–7 with a mark of 3–5 in conference play, tying for sixth place in the PFL. Marist played home games at Tenney Stadium at Leonidoff Field in Poughkeepsie, New York.

== Schedule ==
Date	Time	Opponent	Site	Result	Attendance
September 3	7:00 pm	at Sacred Heart*	Campus Field; Fairfield, CT	W 20–7	2,167
September 10	6:00 pm	at Bucknell*	Christy Mathewson–Memorial Stadium; Lewisburg, PA	L 14–28	3,244
September 17	1:00 pm	at Dayton	Welcome Stadium; Dayton, OH	L 10–24	2,592
September 24	1:00 pm	Georgetown*	Tenney Stadium at Leonidoff Field; Poughkeepsie, NY	L 28–52	3,029
October 1	12:00 pm	Jacksonville	Tenney Stadium at Leonidoff Field; Poughkeepsie, NY	L 9–21	3,212
October 8	1:00 pm	at Davidson	Richardson Stadium; Davidson	W 13–9	3,046
October 15	12:00 pm	Campbell	Tenney Stadium at Leonidoff Field; Poughkeepsie, NY	L 21–35	1,208
October 22	1:00 pm	at Butler	Butler Bowl; Indianapolis, IN	W 28–10	4,085
October 29	12:00 pm	Drake	Tenney Stadium at Leonidoff Field; Poughkeepsie, NY	L 13–23	1,114
November 5	12:00 pm	Valparaiso	Tenney Stadium at Leonidoff Field; Poughkeepsie, NY	W 30–7	1,791
November 12	4:00 pm	at San Diego	Torero Stadium; San Diego, CA	L 7–13	2,018
*Non-conference game; All times are in Eastern time
