= 2011 Brown Bears football team =

American college football season

2011 Brown Bears football
- Conference: Ivy League
- Record: 7–3 (4–3 Ivy)
- Head coach: Phil Estes (14th season)
- Offensive coordinator: Frank Sheehan (6th season)
- Offensive scheme: Pro-style
- Defensive coordinator: Michael Kelleher (11th season)
- Base defense: 4–3
- Home stadium: Brown Stadium

2011 Ivy League football standings
	Conf.			Overall
Team	W		L	W		L
No. 16 Harvard $	7	–	0	9	–	1
Brown	4	–	3	7	–	3
Dartmouth	4	–	3	5	–	5
Penn	4	–	3	5	–	5
Yale	4	–	3	5	–	5
Cornell	3	–	4	5	–	5
Columbia	1	–	6	1	–	9
Princeton	1	–	6	1	–	9
$ – Conference champion; Rankings from The Sports Network poll

The 2011 Brown Bears football team represented Brown University in the 2011 NCAA Division I FCS football season. The Bears were led by 14th year head coach Phil Estes and played their home games at Brown Stadium. They are a member of the Ivy League. They finished the season 7–3 overall and 4–3 in Ivy League play to tie for second place. Brown averaged 5,046 fans a game.

== Schedule ==
Date	Time	Opponent	Site	TV	Result	Attendance
September 17	6:00 p.m.	at Stony Brook*	Kenneth P. LaValle Stadium; Stony Brook, NY		W 21–20	5,732
September 23	7:00 p.m.	at Harvard	Harvard Stadium; Boston, MA		L 7–24	18,565
October 1	6:00 p.m.	Rhode Island*	Brown Stadium; Providence, RI		W 35–21	8,534
October 8	12:30 p.m.	Holy Cross*	Brown Stadium; Providence, RI		W 20–13	4,009
October 15	12:30 p.m.	Princeton^{†}	Brown Stadium; Providence, RI		W 34–0	5,265
October 22	12:30 p.m.	at Cornell	Schoellkopf Field; Ithaca, NY		W 35–24	4,851
October 29	12:30 p.m.	Penn	Brown Stadium; Providence, RI		W 6–0	3,403
November 5	12:00 p.m.	at Yale	Yale Bowl; New Haven, CT	YES Network	W 34–28	19,134
November 12	12:30 p.m.	Dartmouth	Brown Stadium; Providence, RI		L 16–21	4,028
November 19	12:30 p.m.	at Columbia	Wien Stadium; New York, NY		L 28–35 ^{2OT}	5,510
*Non-conference game; ^{†}Homecoming; All times are in Eastern time
