= 2011 Georgetown Hoyas football team =

American college football season

2011 Georgetown Hoyas football
- Conference: Patriot League
- Record: 8–3 (4–2 Patriot)
- Head coach: Kevin Kelly (6th season)
- Offensive coordinator: Dave Patenaude (2nd season)
- Defensive coordinator: Rob Sgarlata (6th season)
- Home stadium: Multi-Sport Field

2011 Patriot League football standings
	Conf.			Overall
Team	W		L	W		L
No. 6 Lehigh $^	6	–	0	11	–	2
Georgetown	4	–	2	8	–	3
Holy Cross	4	–	2	6	–	5
Bucknell	3	–	3	6	–	5
Colgate	2	–	4	5	–	6
Lafayette	2	–	4	4	–	7
Fordham	0	–	6	1	–	10
$ – Conference champion; ^ – FCS playoff participant; Fordham was ineligible for conference title because they offered football scholarships while other Patriot League members did not.; Rankings from The Sports Network poll

The 2011 Georgetown Hoyas football team represented Georgetown University as a member of the Patriot League during the 2011 NCAA Division I FCS football season. Led by sixth-year head coach Kevin Kelly, the Hoyas compiled an overall record of 8–3 with a mark of 4–2 in conference play, tying for second place in the Patriot League. Georgetown played home games at Multi-Sport Field in Washington, D.C.

== Schedule ==
Date	Time	Opponent	Site	Result	Attendance
September 3	6:00 pm	Davidson*	Multi-Sport Field; Washington, DC	W 40–16	2,384
September 10	6:00 pm	Lafayette	Multi-Sport Field; Washington, DC	W 14–13	2,435
September 17	12:00 pm	at Yale*	Yale Bowl; New Haven, CT	L 27–37	12,246
September 24	1:00 pm	at Marist*	Tenney Stadium at Leonidoff Field; Poughkeepsie, NY	W 52–28	3,029
October 1	1:00 pm	at Bucknell	Christy Mathewson–Memorial Stadium; Lewisburg, PA	L 18–35	2,132
October 8	1:00 pm	at Wagner*	Wagner College Stadium; Staten Island, NY	W 24–10	2,267
October 15	1:00 pm	at Howard*	William H. Greene Stadium; Washington, DC	W 21–3	1,891
October 22	2:00 pm	Colgate	Multi-Sport Field; Washington, DC	W 40–17	3,215
October 29	1:00 pm	at Holy Cross	Fitton Field; Worcester, MA	W 19–6	3,873
November 5	1:00 pm	Fordham	Multi-Sport Field; Washington, DC	W 30–13	2,237
November 12	12:30 pm	at No. 6 Lehigh	Goodman Stadium; Bethlehem, PA	L 12–34	6,044
*Non-conference game; Rankings from The Sports Network Poll released prior to the game; All times are in Eastern time
