= 2011 Albany Great Danes football team =

American college football season

2011 Albany Great Danes football

NEC co-champion

NCAA Division I First Round, L 28–31 vs. Stony Brook
- Conference: Northeast Conference

Ranking
- FCS Coaches: No. 23
- Record: 8–4 (7–1 NEC)
- Head coach: Bob Ford (42nd season)
- Offensive coordinator: Ryan McCarthy (4th season)
- Defensive coordinator: Mike Simpson (25th season)
- Home stadium: University Field

2011 Northeast Conference football standings
	Conf.			Overall
Team	W		L	W		L
Duquesne +	7	–	1	9	–	2
Albany +^	7	–	1	8	–	4
Bryant	5	–	3	7	–	4
Monmouth	4	–	4	5	–	6
Wagner	4	–	4	4	–	7
Sacred Heart	3	–	5	5	–	6
Central Connecticut	3	–	5	4	–	7
Robert Morris	2	–	6	2	–	9
Saint Francis (PA)	1	–	7	2	–	9
+ – Conference co-champions; ^ – FCS playoff participant

The 2011 Albany Great Danes football team represented the University at Albany, SUNY as a member of the Northeast Conference (NEC) during the 2011 NCAA Division I FCS football season. Led by 42nd-year head coach Bob Ford, the Great Danes compiled an overall record of 8–4 with a mark of 7–1 in conference play, sharing the NEC title with Duquesne. Due to Albany's head-to-head win over Duquesne, the Great Danes earned the conference's automatic bid into the NCAA Division I Football Championship playoffs, where they lost in the first round to Stony Brook. The team played home games at University Field in Albany New York.

== Schedule ==
Date	Time	Opponent	Site	TV	Result	Attendance
September 3	6:00 pm	at Colgate*	Andy Kerr Stadium; Hamilton, NY		L 34–37 ^{OT}	6,748
September 17	6:00 pm	Maine*	University Field; Albany, NY		L 15–31	4,944
September 24	12:30 pm	at Columbia*	Wien Stadium; Manhattan, NY		W 44–21	3,457
October 1	1:00 pm	at Saint Francis (PA)	DeGol Field; Loretto, PA		W 41–20	868
October 8	1:00 pm	Duquesne	University Field; Albany, NY		W 38–10	3,223
October 15	1:00 pm	Robert Morris^{†}	University Field; Albany, NY		W 28–17	5,878
October 22	12:00 pm	at Central Connecticut	Arute Field; New Britain, CT		W 63–35	3,112
October 29	1:00 pm	at Wagner	Wagner College Stadium; Staten Island, NY		W 24–0	1,012
November 5	1:00 pm	Bryant	University Field; Albany, NY		L 17–31	2,680
November 12	12:00 pm	at Monmouth	Kessler Field; West Long Branch, NJ		W 41–24	3,768
November 19	1:00 pm	Sacred Heart	University Field; Albany, NY		W 31–21	2,914
November 26	2:00 pm	at No. 22 Stony Brook*	Kenneth P. LaValle Stadium; Stony Brook, NY (NCAA Division I First Round, rivalry)	ESPN3	L 28–31	8,286
*Non-conference game; ^{†}Homecoming; Rankings from The Sports Network Poll released prior to the game; All times are in Eastern time
