= 2011 Robert Morris Colonials football team =

American college football season

2011 Robert Morris Colonials football
- Conference: Northeast Conference
- Record: 2–9 (2–6 NEC)
- Head coach: Joe Walton (18th season)
- Defensive coordinator: Scott Farison (4th season)
- Co-defensive coordinator: Scott Benzel (3rd season)
- Home stadium: Joe Walton Stadium

2011 Northeast Conference football standings
	Conf.			Overall
Team	W		L	W		L
Duquesne +	7	–	1	9	–	2
Albany +^	7	–	1	8	–	4
Bryant	5	–	3	7	–	4
Monmouth	4	–	4	5	–	6
Wagner	4	–	4	4	–	7
Sacred Heart	3	–	5	5	–	6
Central Connecticut	3	–	5	4	–	7
Robert Morris	2	–	6	2	–	9
Saint Francis (PA)	1	–	7	2	–	9
+ – Conference co-champions; ^ – FCS playoff participant

The 2011 Robert Morris Colonials football team represented Robert Morris University in the 2011 NCAA Division I FCS football season. The Colonials were led by 18th-year head coach Joe Walton and played their home games at Joe Walton Stadium. They are a member of the Northeast Conference. They finished the season 2–9, 2–6 in NEC play to finish in eighth place.

== Schedule ==
Date	Time	Opponent	Site	Result	Attendance
September 3	12:00 p.m.	Dayton*	Joe Walton Stadium; Moon Township, PA	L 13–19	1,981
September 10	7:00 p.m.	at No. 24 Liberty*	Williams Stadium; Lynchburg, VA	L 7–38	15,805
September 17	1:00 p.m.	at Morgan State*	Hughes Stadium; Baltimore, MD	L 12–13	4,782
October 1	1:00 p.m.	at Monmouth	Kessler Field; West Long Branch, NJ	W 23–20	2,896
October 8	7:00 p.m.	Saint Francis (PA)	Joe Walton Stadium; Moon Township, PA	W 45–14	4,384
October 15	1:00 p.m.	at Albany	University Field; Albany, NY	L 17–28	5,878
October 22	12:00 p.m.	Bryant	Joe Walton Stadium; Moon Township, PA	L 27–34	1,932
October 29	12:00 p.m.	Sacred Heart	Joe Walton Stadium; Moon Township, PA	L 15–27	1,514
November 5	12:00 p.m.	at Central Connecticut	Arute Field; New Britain, CT	L 24–31	2,125
November 12	12:00 p.m.	Wagner	Joe Walton Stadium; Moon Township, PA	L 17–38	2,237
November 19	12:00 p.m.	at Duquesne	Arthur J. Rooney Athletic Field; Pittsburgh, PA	L 10–45	2,410
*Non-conference game; Rankings from The Sports Network Poll released prior to the game; All times are in Eastern time
