= 2011 Butler Bulldogs football team =

American college football season

2011 Butler Bulldogs football
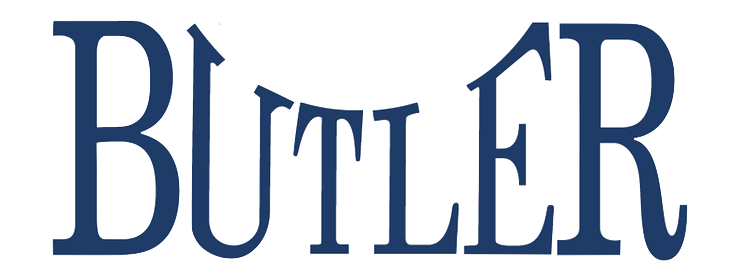
- Conference: Pioneer Football League
- Record: 5–6 (3–5 PFL)
- Head coach: Jeff Voris (6th season)
- Offensive coordinator: Nick Tabacca (1st season)
- Co-defensive coordinators: Joe Cheshire (2nd season); Tim Cooper (2nd season)
- Home stadium: Butler Bowl

2011 Pioneer Football League standings
	Conf.			Overall
Team	W		L	W		L
San Diego +	7	–	1	9	–	2
Drake +	7	–	1	9	–	2
Jacksonville	6	–	2	7	–	4
Campbell	5	–	3	6	–	5
Dayton	4	–	4	6	–	5
Marist	3	–	5	4	–	7
Butler	3	–	5	5	–	6
Davidson	2	–	6	4	–	7
Morehead State	2	–	6	3	–	8
Valparaiso	1	–	7	1	–	10
+ – Conference co-champions

The 2011 Butler Bulldogs football team represented Butler University as a member of the Pioneer Football League (PFL) during the 2011 NCAA Division I FCS football season. Led by sixth-year head coach Jeff Voris, Bulldogs compiled an overall record of 5–6 with a mark of 3–5 in conference play, tying for sixth place in the PFL. Butler played home games at the Butler Bowl in Indianapolis.

== Schedule ==
Date	Time	Opponent	Site	Result	Attendance
September 3	1:00 pm	Albion*	Butler Bowl; Indianapolis, IN	W 31–17	2,223
September 10	2:00 pm	at Indiana State*	Memorial Stadium; Terre Haute, IN	L 34–48	7,148
September 17	1:00 pm	at Taylor*	Wheeler Memorial Stadium; Upland, IN	W 23–6	1,144
September 24	12:00 pm	Drake	Butler Bowl; Indianapolis, IN	L 14–24	2,339
October 1	1:00 pm	at Dayton	Welcome Stadium; Dayton, OH	W 29–27	3,438
October 8	12:00 pm	at Campbell	Barker–Lane Stadium; Buies Creek, NC	L 23–38	1,644
October 15	1:00 pm	Valparaiso	Butler Bowl; Indianapolis, IN (Hoosier Helmet Trophy)	W 42–14	1,716
October 22	1:00 pm	Marist^{†}	Butler Bowl; Indianapolis, IN	L 10–28	4,085
November 5	12:00 pm	Davidson	Butler Bowl; Indianapolis, IN	W 17–7	2,731
November 12	12:00 pm	at Jacksonville	D. B. Milne Field; Jacksonville, FL	L 24–34	3,851
November 19	1:00 pm	at Morehead State	Jayne Stadium; Morehead, KY	L 35–55	3,613
*Non-conference game; ^{†}Homecoming; All times are in Eastern time

== Roster ==
2011 Butler Bulldogs football team roster
Players
Coaches
Offense

Pos.	#	Name	Class
RB	36	Steven Depositar	Jr
RB	31	Brandon Grubbe	Fr
RB	32	Trae Heeter	So
RB	19	Tony Stapleton	Fr
RB	3	Don Stewart	Fr
RB	23	David Thomas	So
QB	10	Andrew Huck	Sr
QB	12	Tom Judge	So
QB	5	Matt Lancaster	Jr
QB	6	Wade Markley	Fr
QB	15	Will Schierholz	Fr
QB	18	Matt Shiltz	Fr
WR	80	Brian Akialis	Fr
WR	82	Brayton Deckard	Fr
WR	17	Scott Harvey	So
WR	2	Stuart Harvey	Sr
WR	85	Matt Hittinger	Fr
WR	1	Jordan Koopman	Sr
WR	7	Jeff Larsen	Sr
WR	86	Tim Longawa	Fr
WR	89	JT Mesch	Fr
WR	87	Quinn Murphy	Fr
WR	83	Derek O'Connor	Fr
WR	4	Prather Prather	Fr
WR	84	Brendan Shannon	So
WR	11	Zach Watkins	Sr
TE	33	William Bork	Sr
TE	92	Cody Bowling	Fr
TE	92	Justin Cummings-Morrow	Fr
TE	38	Matt Jenson	So
TE	81	Dylan Johnson	So
TE	97	Brian Knight	Fr
TE	88	Ryan Webb	Jr
OL	74	Greg Ambrose	Fr
OL	63	Dominick Atkinson	Sr
OL	60	Mike Biegalski	Fr
OL	61	Bryan Brock	Fr
OL	62	Max Brodbeck	Fr
OL	64	Colby Dickey	Fr
OL	65	Jake Goodwin	Fr
OL	77	Jay Howard	So
OL	72	Pete Mattingly	Sr
OL	79	Ryan Myers	Sr
OL	58	Charles Perrecone	So
OL	75	Doug Petty	So
OL	68	Bo Pollard	Fr
OL	76	Charles Schmelzer	Sr
OL	73	Matt Storey	Jr
OL	78	Zach Taylor	Fr
OL	70	David Tiwari	Fr
OL	71	Jeff Urch	So

Defense

Pos.	#	Name	Class
CB	25	Jack McKenna	Sr
DB	34	Jay Brummel	So
DB	26	David Burke	Fr
DB	21	Chris Burns	Jr
DB	16	JoJo Ciancio	Fr
DB	28	Kevin Cook	So
DB	9	Andy Dauch	Sr
DB	44	Greg Egan	Fr
DB	32	Nick Faris	Jr
DB	4	Matthew Foor	Jr
DB	27	Sean Grady	So
DB	29	Daniel Haber	So
DB	3	Rhyan Henson	Fr
DB	7	Ryan Kelsey	Fr
DB	13	T. J. Lukasik	Sr
DB	30	Bobby McDonald	So
DB	18	Thad Satre	So
DB	24	Jimmy Schwabe	Fr
DB	22	Jayme Szafranski	So
LB	8	Bryce Barry	Fr
LB	14	Nick Caldicott	Sr
LB	40	Chris Celio	Fr
LB	49	Christian Eble	Fr
LB	46	Jordan Massey	Fr
LB	48	Logan Perry	Fr
LB	42	Phillip Powell	So
LB	59	Jordan Ridley	Jr
LB	15	Zach Sedivy	Fr
LB	43	Bret Shannon	Fr
LB	37	Richard Sorrentino	Fr
LB	45	Paul Yanow	Fr
DL	41	Kashton Adams-Foley	Fr
DL	67	Kyle Annis	Fr
DL	95	Taylor Clarkson	Jr
DL	98	Grant Hunter	Sr
DL	51	Robert Koteff	Sr
DL	47	Ian Luscombe	Fr
DL	69	Nick McInally	Fr
DL	56	Nick Nykaza	Fr
DL	52	Jeff Poss	Sr
DL	53	Hunter Renschler	Fr
DL	99	Dan Satterthwaite	Fr
DL	94	Glen Somers	Fr
DL	88	Steven Sreniawski	Fr
DL	91	Jeremy Stephens	So
DL	57	Ross Teare	Sr
DL	55	Jace Tennant	Jr
DL	90	Larry Thomas	Sr

Special teams

Pos.	#	Name	Class
PK	35	David Lang	Sr
PK	96	Daniel Wilson	Fr
P	20	Michael Wilson	Jr
K	19	Matthew Kersten	Fr
K/P	39	Brett Thomaston	So

Head coach

Jeff Voris

Coordinators/assistant coaches

Joe Cheshire
Tim Cooper
Nick Tabacca
Nick Anderson
Rob Noel
Kenan Smith
Colin Johnson
Andrew Belluomini

Legend

- (C) Team captain
- (S) Suspended
- (I) Ineligible
- Injured
- Redshirt
