= 2011 Columbia Lions football team =

American college football season

2011 Columbia Lions football
- Conference: Ivy League
- Record: 1–9 (1–6 Ivy)
- Head coach: Norries Wilson (6th season)
- Offensive coordinator: Vinny Marino (6th season)
- Home stadium: Robert K. Kraft Field at Lawrence A. Wien Stadium

2011 Ivy League football standings
	Conf.			Overall
Team	W		L	W		L
No. 16 Harvard $	7	–	0	9	–	1
Brown	4	–	3	7	–	3
Dartmouth	4	–	3	5	–	5
Penn	4	–	3	5	–	5
Yale	4	–	3	5	–	5
Cornell	3	–	4	5	–	5
Columbia	1	–	6	1	–	9
Princeton	1	–	6	1	–	9
$ – Conference champion; Rankings from The Sports Network poll

The 2011 Columbia Lions football team represented Columbia University in the 2011 NCAA Division I FCS football season. The Lions were led by sixth year head coach Norries Wilson and played their home games at Robert K. Kraft Field at Lawrence A. Wien Stadium. They are a member of the Ivy League. They finished the season 1–9, 1–6 in Ivy League play to finish in a tie for seventh place. Head coach Norries Wilson was fired at the end of the season after a 17–43 record in six seasons. Columbia averaged 4,409 fans per game.

== Schedule ==
Date	Time	Opponent	Site	TV	Result	Attendance
September 17	1:00 p.m.	at Fordham*	Coffey Field; Bronx, NY (Liberty Cup)		L 14–21	6,820
September 24	12:30 p.m.	Albany*	Robert K. Kraft Field at Lawrence A. Wien Stadium; New York, NY		L 21–44	3,457
October 1	6:00 p.m.	at Princeton	Powers Field at Princeton Stadium; Princeton, NJ		L 21–24	6,168
October 8	12:30 p.m.	Sacred Heart*	Robert K. Kraft Field at Lawrence A. Wien Stadium; New York, NY		L 25–34	3,003
October 15	3:30 p.m.	Penn^{†}	Robert K. Kraft Field at Lawrence A. Wien Stadium; New York, NY	Versus	L 20–27	9,124
October 22	1:30 p.m.	at Dartmouth	Memorial Field; Hanover, NH		L 0–37	8,362
October 29	12:30 p.m.	Yale	Robert K. Kraft Field at Lawrence A. Wien Stadium; New York, NY	YES	L 13–16	1,209
November 5	12:30 p.m.	No. 23 Harvard	Robert K. Kraft Field at Lawrence A. Wien Stadium; New York, NY		L 21–35	4,153
November 12	12:30 p.m.	at Cornell	Schoellkopf Field; Ithaca, NY (rivalry)		L 41–62	6,128
November 19	12:30 p.m.	Brown	Robert K. Kraft Field at Lawrence A. Wien Stadium; New York, NY		W 35–28 ^{2OT}	5,510
*Non-conference game; ^{†}Homecoming; Rankings from The Sports Network Poll released prior to the game; All times are in Eastern time
