= 2011 Drake Bulldogs football team =

American college football season

2011 Drake Bulldogs football

PFL co-champion
- Conference: Pioneer Football League
- Record: 9–2 (7–1 PFL)
- Head coach: Chris Creighton (4th season)
- Offensive scheme: Multiple
- Defensive coordinator: Brian Ward (1st season)
- Base defense: 4–2–5
- Home stadium: Drake Stadium

2011 Pioneer Football League standings
	Conf.			Overall
Team	W		L	W		L
San Diego +	7	–	1	9	–	2
Drake +	7	–	1	9	–	2
Jacksonville	6	–	2	7	–	4
Campbell	5	–	3	6	–	5
Dayton	4	–	4	6	–	5
Marist	3	–	5	4	–	7
Butler	3	–	5	5	–	6
Davidson	2	–	6	4	–	7
Morehead State	2	–	6	3	–	8
Valparaiso	1	–	7	1	–	10
+ – Conference co-champions

The 2011 Drake Bulldogs football team represented Drake University as member of the Pioneer Football League (PFL) during the 2011 NCAA Division I FCS football season. Led by fourth-year head coach Chris Creighton, the Bulldogs compiled and overall record of 9–2 with a mark of 7–1 in conference play, sharing the PFL title with San Diego. The team played home games at Drake Stadium in Des Moines, Iowa.

== Schedule ==
Date	Time	Opponent	Site	TV	Result	Attendance	Source
September 1	7:00 pm	at North Dakota*	Alerus Center; Grand Forks, ND	FCS	L 0–16	8,484	
September 10	6:00 pm	Grand View*	Drake Stadium; Des Moines, IA		W 28–21 ^{OT}	4,215	
September 17	6:00 pm	Missouri S&T*	Drake Stadium; Des Moines, IA		W 27–23	3,578	
September 24	11:00 am	at Butler	Butler Bowl; Indianapolis, IN		W 24–14	2,339	
October 1	1:00 pm	Campbell	Drake Stadium; Des Moines, IA		W 31–14	2,427	
October 8	12:00 pm	at Morehead State	Jayne Stadium; Morehead, KY		W 41–26	4,377	
October 15	3:00 pm	at San Diego	Torero Stadium; San Diego, CA		L 24–31	2,529	
October 22	1:00 pm	Valparaiso	Drake Stadium; Des Moines, IA		W 50–0	2,145	
October 29	11:00 am	at Marist	Tenney Stadium at Leonidoff Field; Poughkeepsie, NY		W 23–13	1,114	
November 5	1:00 pm	Jacksonville	Drake Stadium; Des Moines, IA		W 31–24	1,867	
November 12	1:00 pm	Dayton	Drake Stadium; Des Moines, IA (rivalry)		W 37–14	2,387	
*Non-conference game; All times are in Central time

== Previous season and Kilimanjaro Bowl ==
The Bulldogs finished third in 2010 Pioneer Football League. On May 21, 2011, Drake participated in the 2011 Global Kilimanjaro Bowl against CONADEIP, a Mexican College Football all-star team. The game, which took place at Sheikh Amri Abeid Memorial Stadium in Arusha, Tanzania, was the first American football and first College Football game ever played in Africa. Drake won the game 17–7. The team finished with an 8–4 record in the 2010–11 season, which included their first bowl victory since 1949.

== 2011 season summary ==
Drake continued their success during the 2011 season after the victory in the Kilimanjaro Bowl. The Bulldogs shared the Pioneer Football League title. Coach Creighton and his team were honored with the NCAS Giant Steps Award for their charity work in Africa. They were also featured in a documentary by CBS Sports for their work in Africa.

After an opening loss to North Dakota, Drake compiled five victories in a row before losing a close contest to San Diego. The loss would be their last, as the Bulldogs won their final four games of the season. Notable games included Marist (played in a snow storm), Jacksonville (a last second touchdown victory), and Dayton (the conference title clincher).
