= 2011 Sacred Heart Pioneers football team =

American college football season

2011 Sacred Heart Pioneers football
- Conference: Northeast Conference
- Record: 5–6 (3–5 NEC)
- Head coach: Paul Gorham (8th season)
- Offensive coordinator: Kevin Bolis (1st season)
- Defensive coordinator: Dave Wissman (1st season)
- Home stadium: Campus Field

2011 Northeast Conference football standings
	Conf.			Overall
Team	W		L	W		L
Duquesne +	7	–	1	9	–	2
Albany +^	7	–	1	8	–	4
Bryant	5	–	3	7	–	4
Monmouth	4	–	4	5	–	6
Wagner	4	–	4	4	–	7
Sacred Heart	3	–	5	5	–	6
Central Connecticut	3	–	5	4	–	7
Robert Morris	2	–	6	2	–	9
Saint Francis (PA)	1	–	7	2	–	9
+ – Conference co-champions; ^ – FCS playoff participant

The 2011 Sacred Heart Pioneers football team represented Sacred Heart University as a member of the Northeast Conference (NEC) during the 2011 NCAA Division I FCS football season. Led by Paul Gorham in his eight and final season as head coach, the Pioneers compiled an overall record of 5–6 with a mark of 3–5 in conference play, tying for sixth place in the NEC. Sacred Heart played home games at Campus Field in Fairfield, Connecticut.

== Schedule ==
Date	Time	Opponent	Site	Result	Attendance
September 3	7:00 p.m.	Marist*	Campus Field; Fairfield, CT	L 7–20	2,167
September 16	7:00 p.m.	Bryant	Campus Field; Fairfield, CT	L 6–26	2,008
September 24	1:00 p.m.	Dartmouth*^{†}	Campus Field; Fairfield, CT	W 24–21	3,101
October 1	12:00 p.m.	at Central Connecticut	Arute Field; New Britain, CT	W 37–24	3,618
October 8	12:30 p.m.	at Columbia*	Robert K. Kraft Field at Lawrence A. Wien Stadium; Manhattan, NY	W 34–25	3,003
October 15	12:00 p.m.	Saint Francis (PA)	Campus Field; Fairfield, CT	W 60–45	1,169
October 22	1:00 p.m.	Monmouth	Campus Field; Fairfield, CT	L 17–31	3,468
October 29	12:00 p.m.	at Robert Morris	Joe Walton Stadium; Moon Township, PA	W 27–15	1,514
November 5	1:00 p.m.	at Wagner	Wagner College Stadium; Staten Island, NY	L 21–27	1,735
November 12	12:00 p.m.	Duquesne	Campus Field; Fairfield, CT	L 15–29	1,470
November 19	1:00 p.m.	at Albany	University Field; Albany, NY	L 21–31	2,914
*Non-conference game; ^{†}Homecoming; All times are in Eastern time
