= 2011 Dartmouth Big Green football team =

American college football season

2011 Dartmouth Big Green football
- Conference: Ivy League
- Record: 5–5 (4–3 Ivy)
- Head coach: Buddy Teevens (12th season)
- Offensive coordinator: Keith Clark (2nd season)
- Offensive scheme: Multiple
- Defensive coordinator: Don Dobes (2nd season)
- Base defense: 4–3
- Home stadium: Memorial Field

2011 Ivy League football standings
	Conf.			Overall
Team	W		L	W		L
No. 16 Harvard $	7	–	0	9	–	1
Brown	4	–	3	7	–	3
Dartmouth	4	–	3	5	–	5
Penn	4	–	3	5	–	5
Yale	4	–	3	5	–	5
Cornell	3	–	4	5	–	5
Columbia	1	–	6	1	–	9
Princeton	1	–	6	1	–	9
$ – Conference champion; Rankings from The Sports Network poll

The 2011 Dartmouth Big Green football team represented Dartmouth College in the 2011 NCAA Division I FCS football season. The Big Green were led by head coach Buddy Teevens in his seventh straight year and 12th overall and played their home games at Memorial Field. They are a member of the Ivy League. They finished the season 5–5 overall and 4–3 in Ivy League play to tie for second place.

== Schedule ==
Date	Time	Opponent	Site	TV	Result	Attendance
September 17	1:30 p.m.	Colgate*	Memorial Field; Hanover, NH		W 37–20	5,616
September 24	1:00 p.m.	at Sacred Heart*	Campus Field; Fairfield, CT		L 21–24	3,101
October 1	6:00 p.m.	Penn	Memorial Field; Hanover, NH		L 20–22	8,117
October 8	12:00 p.m.	at Yale	Yale Bowl; New Haven, CT		L 0–30	17,786
October 15	1:00 p.m.	at Holy Cross*	Fitton Field; Worcester, MA		L 17–25	4,392
October 22	1:30 p.m.	Columbia^{†}	Memorial Field; Hanover, NH		W 37–0	8,362
October 29	6:00 p.m.	at No. 24 Harvard	Harvard Stadium; Boston, MA (rivalry)	FCS Atlantic	L 10–41	6,029
November 5	1:30 p.m.	Cornell	Memorial Field; Hanover, NH (rivalry)		W 33–24	3,137
November 12	12:30 p.m.	at Brown	Brown Stadium; Providence, RI		W 21–16	4,028
November 19	1:30 p.m.	Princeton	Memorial Field; Hanover, NH		W 24–17	4,003
*Non-conference game; ^{†}Homecoming; Rankings from The Sports Network Poll released prior to the game; All times are in Eastern time
