= 2011 Duquesne Dukes football team =

American college football season

2011 Duquesne Dukes football
- Conference: Northeast Conference
- Record: 9–2 (7–1 NEC)
- Head coach: Jerry Schmitt (7th season)
- Offensive coordinator: Gary Dunn (3rd season)
- Defensive coordinator: Dave Opfar (2nd season)
- Home stadium: Arthur J. Rooney Field

2011 Northeast Conference football standings
	Conf.			Overall
Team	W		L	W		L
Duquesne +	7	–	1	9	–	2
Albany +^	7	–	1	8	–	4
Bryant	5	–	3	7	–	4
Monmouth	4	–	4	5	–	6
Wagner	4	–	4	4	–	7
Sacred Heart	3	–	5	5	–	6
Central Connecticut	3	–	5	4	–	7
Robert Morris	2	–	6	2	–	9
Saint Francis (PA)	1	–	7	2	–	9
+ – Conference co-champions; ^ – FCS playoff participant

The 2011 Duquesne Dukes football team represented Duquesne University as a member of the Northeast Conference (NEC) during the 2011 NCAA Division I FCS football season. The Dukes were led by seventh-year head coach Jerry Schmitt and played their home games at Arthur J. Rooney Athletic Field. They finished the season 9–2 overall and 7–1 in NEC play to share the conference championship with Albany. However, Albany claimed the conference automatic bid to the NCAA Division I Football Championship playoffs due to their head to head victory, and the Dukes did not receive an at-large bid.

== Schedule ==
Date	Time	Opponent	Site	TV	Result	Attendance
September 3	6:00 pm	at Bucknell*	Christy Mathewson–Memorial Stadium; Lewisburg, PA		L 26–27	6,054
September 10	1:00 pm	at Dayton*	Welcome Stadium; Dayton, OH		W 22–13	2,887
September 17	12:00 pm	Valparaiso*	Arthur J. Rooney Athletic Field; Pittsburgh, PA		W 49–14	1,859
September 24	7:00 pm	at Saint Francis (PA)	DeGol Field; Loretto, PA	MSG+	W 41–14	2,361
October 1	1:00 pm	Bryant	Arthur J. Rooney Athletic Field; Pittsburgh, PA		W 31–28	2,212
October 8	1:00 pm	at Albany	University Field; Albany, NY		L 10–38	3,223
October 15	12:00 pm	Central Connecticut	Arthur J. Rooney Athletic Field; Pittsburgh, PA		W 28–21	2,211
October 22	12:00 pm	Wagner	Arthur J. Rooney Athletic Field; Pittsburgh, PA		W 37–21	2,098
October 29	1:00 pm	at Monmouth	Kessler Field; West Long Branch, NJ		W 16–0	1,050
November 12	12:00 pm	at Sacred Heart	Campus Field; Fairfield, CT		W 29–15	1,470
November 19	12:00 pm	Robert Morris	Arthur J. Rooney Athletic Field; Pittsburgh, PA		W 45–10	2,410
*Non-conference game; All times are in Eastern time
