= 2011 Monmouth Hawks football team =

American college football season

2011 Monmouth Hawks football
- Conference: Northeast Conference
- Record: 5–6 (4–4 NEC)
- Head coach: Kevin Callahan (19th season)
- Offensive coordinator: Scott Van Zile (4th season)
- Offensive scheme: Multiple
- Defensive coordinator: Andy Bobik (18th season)
- Base defense: 4–3
- Home stadium: Kessler Field

2011 Northeast Conference football standings
	Conf.			Overall
Team	W		L	W		L
Duquesne +	7	–	1	9	–	2
Albany +^	7	–	1	8	–	4
Bryant	5	–	3	7	–	4
Monmouth	4	–	4	5	–	6
Wagner	4	–	4	4	–	7
Sacred Heart	3	–	5	5	–	6
Central Connecticut	3	–	5	4	–	7
Robert Morris	2	–	6	2	–	9
Saint Francis (PA)	1	–	7	2	–	9
+ – Conference co-champions; ^ – FCS playoff participant

The 2011 Monmouth Hawks football team represented Monmouth University in the 2011 NCAA Division I FCS football season as a member of the Northeast Conference (NEC). The Hawks were led by 19th-year head coach Kevin Callahan and played their home games at Kessler Field. They finished the season 5–6 overall and 4–4 in NEC play to tie for fourth place.

== Schedule ==
Date	Time	Opponent	Site	Result	Attendance
September 3	1:00 p.m.	No. 13 Lehigh*	Kessler Field; West Long Branch, NJ	L 24–49	3,265
September 17	3:30 p.m.	at Villanova*	Villanova Stadium; Philadelphia, PA	W 20–9	11,817
September 24	12:00 p.m.	at Central Connecticut	Arute Field; New Britain, CT	W 24–12	2,936
October 1	1:00 p.m.	Robert Morris	Kessler Field; West Long Branch, NJ	L 20–23	2,896
October 8	1:00 p.m.	Colgate*	Kessler Field; West Long Branch, NJ	L 14–26	3,452
October 15	1:00 p.m.	at Bryant	Bulldog Stadium; Smithfield, RI	W 40–35	4,587
October 22	1:00 p.m.	at Sacred Heart	Campus Field; Fairfield, CT	W 31–17	3,468
October 29	1:00 p.m.	Duquesne	Kessler Field; West Long Branch, NJ	L 0–16	1,050
November 5	1:00 p.m.	at Saint Francis (PA)	DeGol Field; Loretto, PA	W 48–45	1,712
November 12	12:00 p.m.	Albany	Kessler Field; West Long Branch, NJ	L 24–41	3,768
November 19	12:00 p.m.	Wagner	Kessler Field; West Long Branch, NJ	L 29–44	1,584
*Non-conference game; Rankings from The Sports Network Poll released prior to the game; All times are in Eastern time
