= 2011 Bryant Bulldogs football team =

American college football season

2011 Bryant Bulldogs football
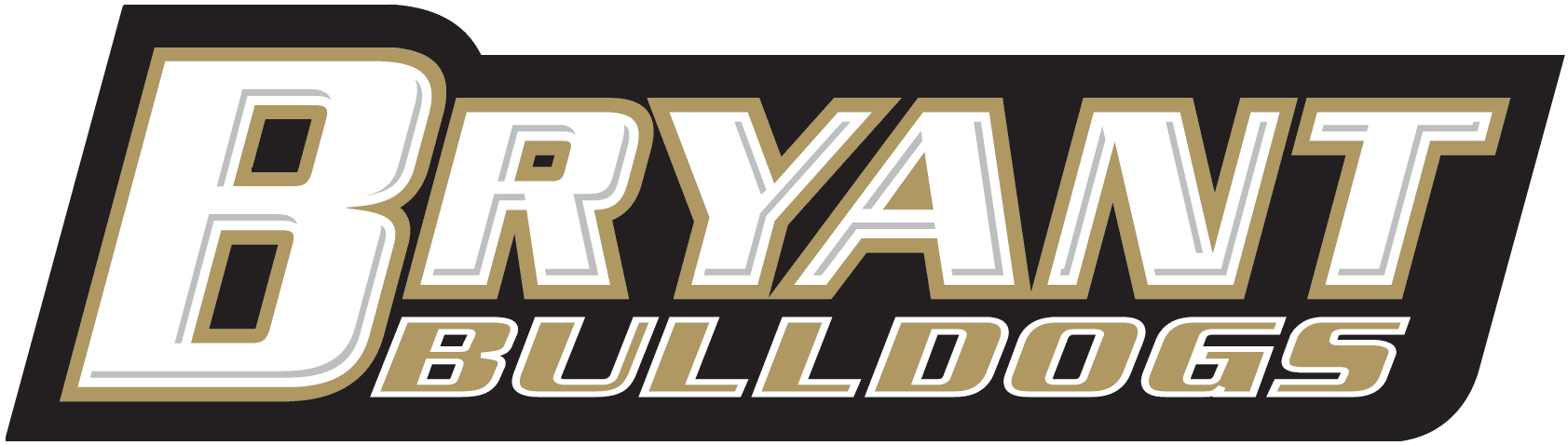
- Conference: Northeast Conference
- Record: 7–4 (5–3 NEC)
- Head coach: Marty Fine (8th season)
- Defensive coordinator: Greg Gigantino (5th season)
- Home stadium: Bulldog Stadium

2011 Northeast Conference football standings
	Conf.			Overall
Team	W		L	W		L
Duquesne +	7	–	1	9	–	2
Albany +^	7	–	1	8	–	4
Bryant	5	–	3	7	–	4
Monmouth	4	–	4	5	–	6
Wagner	4	–	4	4	–	7
Sacred Heart	3	–	5	5	–	6
Central Connecticut	3	–	5	4	–	7
Robert Morris	2	–	6	2	–	9
Saint Francis (PA)	1	–	7	2	–	9
+ – Conference co-champions; ^ – FCS playoff participant

The 2011 Bryant Bulldogs football team represented Bryant University as a member of the Northeast Conference (NEC) during the 2011 NCAA Division I FCS football season. Led by eighth-year head coach Marty Fine, the Bulldogs compiled an overall record of 7–4 with a mark of 5–3 in conference play, placing third in the NEC. Bryant played home games at Bulldog Stadium in Smithfield, Rhode Island.

== Schedule ==
Date	Time	Opponent	Site	Result	Attendance
September 3	5:00 p.m.	at Maine*	Alfond Stadium; Orono, ME	L 13–28	6,041
September 10	1:00 p.m.	American International*	Bulldog Stadium; Smithfield, RI	W 27–16	1,671
September 16	7:00 p.m.	at Sacred Heart	Campus Field; Fairfield, CT	W 26–6	2,008
September 24	1:00 p.m.	Wagner^{†}	Bulldog Stadium; Smithfield, RI	W 30–28	4,217
October 1	1:00 p.m.	at Duquesne	Arthur J. Rooney Athletic Field; Pittsburgh, PA	L 28–31	2,212
October 8	1:00 p.m.	Stonehill*	Bulldog Stadium; Smithfield, RI	W 42–7	1,677
October 15	1:00 p.m.	Monmouth	Bulldog Stadium; Smithfield, RI	L 35–40	4,587
October 22	12:00 p.m.	at Robert Morris	Joe Walton Stadium; Moon Township, PA	W 34–27	1,932
November 5	1:00 p.m.	at Albany	University Field; Albany, NY	W 31–17	2,680
November 12	12:00 p.m.	Saint Francis (PA)	Bulldog Stadium; Smithfield, RI	W 45–34	1,476
November 19	12:00 p.m.	Central Connecticut	Bulldog Stadium; Smithfield, RI	L 21–42	1,812
*Non-conference game; ^{†}Homecoming; All times are in Eastern time
